= List of power stations in England =

This is a list of current and former electricity-generating power stations in England. For lists in the rest of the UK, including proposed stations, see the see also section below.

Note that DESNZ maintains a comprehensive list of current UK power stations.

== Thermal ==
Name	Location	District/ county	Region	Coordinates	Type	Total capacity (MW)	Opened	Closed	Demolished	Notes
Accrington	Accrington	Lancashire	North West	53°45′24″N 2°22′16″W	Coal	15.75	1900	1958	yes	In 1916 a transmission line installed to Rawtenstall, so that both stations could supply Haslingden. It was also connected to Padiham A when that station opened.
Acton Lane A	North Acton	Ealing	Greater London	51°31′50″N 0°15′21″W	Coal	?	1899	1950?	yes	
Acton Lane B	North Acton	Ealing	Greater London	51°31′50″N 0°15′21″W	Coal	150	1950	1983	>1989	
Agecroft A	Pendlebury	Salford	North West	53°30′55″N 2°18′03″W	Coal	100	1925	1992	1993–1994	4×25 MW generators
Agecroft B	Pendlebury	Salford	North West	53°30′55″N 2°18′03″W	Coal	120	1962	1992	1993–1994	2×60 MW generator
Agecroft C	Pendlebury	Salford	North West	53°30′55″N 2°18′03″W	Coal	240	1962	1992	1993–1994	2×120 MW generator
Alderley Edge	Alderley Edge	Cheshire	North West		Coal / diesel engine	0.64 / 4	1896 / 1955	1953 / 1970s		Replaced earlier station closed in 1953
Allington Quarry Incinerator	Maidstone	Kent	South East	51°17′34″N 0°29′28″E	Waste	40	2007			
Ashford A	Ashford	Kent	South East	51°08′44″N 0°52′08″E	Fuel oil	2.05	1923	1967	yes	
Ashford B	Ashford	Kent	South East	51°08′44″N 0°52′08″E	Diesel	10	1954	1981	yes	
Ashford	Ashford	Kent	South East		Natural gas	21	2018			Peaking plant
Avon	Warwick	Warwickshire	Midlands		Coal	31				Also known as Warwick.See
Ayresome	Middlesbrough	North Yorkshire	North East		Waste heat	3				
Back o' th' Bank	Bolton	Greater Manchester	North West	53°35′35″N 2°25′27″W	Coal	89	1914	1979	1982	Also known as Bolton p.s.
Bankside A	Bankside	Southwark	Greater London	51°30′25″N 0°05′55″W	Coal + oil	95	1891	1959	1959	
Bankside B	Bankside	Southwark	Greater London	51°30′25″N 0°05′55″W	Oil	300	1952	1981		Building converted to Tate Modern gallery in 2000
Barking A	Creekmouth	Barking and Dagenham	Greater London	51°30′59″N 0°06′40″E	Coal	600	1925	1976	yes	
Barking B	Creekmouth	Barking and Dagenham	Greater London	51°30′59″N 0°06′40″E	Coal	144	1939	1976	yes	
Barking C	Creekmouth	Barking and Dagenham	Greater London	51°30′59″N 0°06′40″E	Coal	220	1954	1981	yes	
Barking Reach	Dagenham	Barking and Dagenham	Greater London	51°31′16″N 0°08′49″E	CCGT	1,000	1995	2016	2018–2019	
Barking Urban District Council	East St Barking	Barking and Dagenham	Greater London	51°32′14″N 0°04′46″E	Coal	?	1897	1927	?	
Barnes	Barnes	Wandsworth	Greater London	51°28′13″N 0°15′29″W	Coal	6.5	1901	1959	Building reused	
Barnstaple	Barnstaple	Devon	South West		Oil engine	2.12		1958		
Barrow-in-Furness	Barrow-in-Furness	Cumbria	North West	54°06′57″N 3°13′20″W	Coal	23	1899	1960	yes	
Barton	Trafford Park	Trafford	North West	53°28′23″N 2°20′56″W	Coal	69	1923	1974	1978–1979	
Barton Combined Heat and Power Plant (CHP)	Barton-upon-Irwell	Greater Manchester	North West	53°28′05″N 2°22′11″W	Biomass (primarily recycled wood)	20	TBD			
Barugh	Barnsley	South Yorkshire	Yorkshire and the Humber	53°34′24″N 1°31′09″W	Coke oven gas, diesel	14, 4	1913, 1954	1958, 1963	yes	
Basingstoke	Basingstoke	Hampshire	South West		Oil engine	2.47				
Bath	Bath	Somerset	South West	51°22′40″N 2°21′32″W	Coal, oil, diesel	16	1890	1960s	Yes	
Battersea A	Battersea	Wandsworth	Greater London	51°28′54″N 0°08′41″W	Coal	243	1935	1975		Redeveloped, opened to the public in 2022
Battersea B	Battersea	Wandsworth	Greater London	51°28′54″N 0°08′41″W	Coal	503	1955	1983		Redeveloped, opened to the public in 2022
Beckenham	Beckenham	London	Greater London		Coal	4.75				
Bedford	Bedford	Bedfordshire	East		Coal	13.75	1894	1966		
Belvedere	Belvedere	Bexley	Greater London	51°30′16″N 0°09′34″E	Oil	?	1962	1980s	1992	
Berkeley 1	Berkeley	Gloucestershire	South West	51°41′33″N 2°29′37″W	Nuclear (magnox)	138	1962	1989		
Berkeley 2	Berkeley	Gloucestershire	South West	51°41′33″N 2°29′37″W	Nuclear (magnox)	138	1962	1988		
Berwick-upon-Tweed	Berwick-upon-Tweed	Northumberland	North East	55°46′00″N 2°00′17″W	Coal		1930s		1990s	
Birchills (Walsall)	Birchills	Walsall	West Midlands	52°35′46″N 1°59′52″W	Coal	17.5	1916	1967	yes	
Birkdale	Southport	Liverpool City Region	North West		Oil engine	0.5				
Bishop's Castle	Bishop's Castle	Shropshire	West Midlands	52°29′34″N 3°00′00″W	Gas engines	0.1	1915			
Blackburn	Blackburn	Lancashire	North West	53°44′44″N 2°28′52″W	Coal	150	1895	c.1925	partial	The building was the regional office for NORWEB into the 1990s, and has since become part of Blackburn Youth Zone.
Blackburn Mill	Blackburn	Blackburn with Darwen	North West	53°43′05″N 2°32′16″W	CCGT (gas fired)	60	2002			Formerly CHP plant
Blackburn Meadows Biomass Plant	Blackburn Meadows	Sheffield	Yorkshire and the Humber	53°25′05″N 1°24′17″W	Biomass (recycled waste wood)	25	2014			
Blackburn Meadows	Blackburn Meadows	Sheffield	Yorkshire and the Humber	53°25′05″N 1°24′17″W	Coal	72	1921	1980	2008 (cooling towers)	
Blackpool	Blackpool	Lancashire	North West	53°48′36″N 3°03′06″W	Coal + diesel engine	18.7			yes	
Blackwall Point	Greenwich Peninsula	Greenwich	Greater London	51°29′52″N 0°00′41″E	Coal	100.5	1900	1981	Yes	The only visible remains of the station is the coaling pier in the Thames.
Blaydon Burn Stage 1	Blaydon	Tyne and Wear	North East	54°57′15″N 1°44′38″W	Waste heat	0.55	1904	Stage 2		
Blaydon Burn Stage 2	Blaydon	Tyne and Wear	North East		Waste heat	3	1916	1959		
Bloom Street	Manchester	Manchester	North West		Coal	7.2	1901	1951	?	
Blyth A	Cambois	Northumberland	North East	55°08′33″N 1°31′37″W	Coal	480	1958	1999	2003	
Blyth B	Cambois	Northumberland	North East		Coal	1,250	1962	2001	2003	Two units decommissioned in 1991
Bold	Bold	Liverpool City Region	North West	53°26′02″N 2°41′18″W	Coal	300	1960	1990	yes	
Bolton (Spa Road)	Bolton	Greater Manchester	North West	53°34′40″N 2°26′18″W	Coal	37	1894	After 1918	no	Building extant (2020); see also Back o' th' Bank
Bourne Valley	Bournemouth	Dorset			Coal	4.6		June 1935		
Bow	Bow	Tower Hamlets	Greater London	51°32′03″N 0°00′43″W	Coal	51.5	1902	1968	yes	
Bradford	Bradford	West Yorkshire	Yorkshire and the Humber	53°48′11″N 1°45′15″W	Coal	70	1889	1976	1978	Site is now occupied by industrial and commercial units.
Bradwell A	Bradwell-on-Sea	Essex	East	51°44′29″N 0°53′49″E	Nuclear (magnox)	123	1962	2002		
Brigg	Brigg	North Lincolnshire	Yorkshire and the Humber	53°32′33″N 0°30′33″W	Straw biomass	40	2016			See also Glanford and Glanford Brigg PS
Brighton A	Brighton	Brighton & Hove	South East	50°49′46″N 0°13′50″W	Coal	190		1975		
Brighton B	Brighton	Brighton & Hove	South East	50°49′46″N 0°13′50″W	Coal	342				
Brimsdown	Brimsdown	Enfield	Greater London	51°39′39″N 0°01′18″W	Coal	?	1907	1974	yes	
Bristol	Bristol	Somerset	South West	51°27′00″N 2°34′00″W	Coal	25.8	1902	1959	Yes (Feeder Road)	Original power station converted to commercial use
Bromborough	Bromborough	Liverpool City Region	North West	53°20′04″N 2°57′45″W	Oil	210	1951	1980	1986	
Brunswick Wharf	Blackwall	Tower Hamlets	Greater London	51°30′29″N 0°00′04″E	Coal + oil	340	1952	1984	1989	
Bude	Bude	Cornwall			Gas + oil	0.136				
Bulls Bridge	Hayes	Hillingdon	Greater London	51°30′07″N 0°24′32″W	OCGT	280	1980	1993	yes	
Burghfield	Burghfield	Berkshire	South East	51°25′46″N 1°0′14″W	Gas	45	1998			
Burnley	Burnley	Lancashire	North West	53°47′12″N 2°14′23″W	Coal	8	1893	1958	yes	See reference. It was connected to the grid by 1933. Sub station remains.
Burton upon Trent	Burton upon Trent	Staffordshire	Midlands	52°48′54″N 1°37′27″W	Coal	41	1894	1976	yes	
Bury	Bury	Greater Manchester	North West	53°35′51″N 2°17′57″W	Coal	26	1896	1970	yes	
Buxton	Buxton	Cheshire	North West		Diesel engine	0.580 / 4	1894 / 1954	1953 / 1970s		
Calder Hall	Seascale	Cumbria	North West	54°25′14″N 3°29′51″W	Nuclear (magnox)	200	1956	2003	2007 (cooling towers)	4×50 MW. First nuclear power station in the UK.
Cambridge	Cambridge	Cambridgeshire	East		Coal	7.26		1966?		
Canterbury	Canterbury	Kent	South East	51°17′03″N 1°05′10″E	Coal	4.4	1900	1960	Yes	
Carlisle	Carlisle	Cumbria	North West	54°53′25″N 2°56′10″W	Coal	5.25	1899	1927	No	Building extant
Carlisle	Carlisle	Cumbria	North West	54°53′07″N 2°54′00″W	Coal	86.9	1923	1980	1988	
Carrington CCGT	Carrington	Greater Manchester	North West	53°26′09″N 2°24′39″W	CCGT	910	2016			2×Alstom GT26 Single Shaft
Carrington Coal	Carrington	Greater Manchester	North West	53°26′09″N 2°24′39″W	Coal	240	1956	1991	1990s	
Carville A	Wallsend	Tyne and Wear	North East	54°59′17″N 1°31′22″W	Coal	10	1904	1932	1962	
Carville B	Wallsend	Tyne and Wear	North East	54°59′17″N 1°31′22″W	Coal	55	1916	1960s	1962	
Castle Donington	Castle Donington	Leicestershire	East Midlands	52°50′52″N 1°21′31″W	Coal	600	1958	1995	1996	
Castle Meads	Gloucester	Gloucestershire	South West		Coal	38		1976		
Chadderton A (Slacks Valley)	Chadderton	Greater Manchester	North West	53°31′54″N 2°09′57″W	Coal	?	1927	1960s	1975	
Chadderton B	Chadderton	Greater Manchester	North West	53°31′54″N 2°09′57″W	Coal	240	1955	1982	1986	
Chamber Hall Power Station	Bury	Greater Manchester	North West	53°35′50″N 2°17′55″W	Coal	26	1912	1969	yes	
Cheltenham	Cheltenham	Gloucestershire	West Midlands	51°54′30″N 2°05′45″W	Coal	4	1895	1932	no	
Chesham	Chesham	Buckinghamshire			Coal	1.775				
Chesterfield	Chesterfield	Derbyshire	East Midlands	53°14′10″N 1°26′21″W	Coal	6.9	1901	1958	yes	
Chickerell	Chickerell	Dorset	South West	50°37′24″N 2°29′23″W	Gas	45	1998			
Chippenham	Chippenham	Wiltshire	South West	51°28′04″N 2°06′22″W	Gas	10	2002			
Christchurch	Christchurch	Dorset			Coal	0.4				
Church Stretton	Church Stretton	Shropshire	West Midlands	52°32′12″N 2°48′02″W	Gas engines	0.1	1904	1929		
Chopwell Colliery	Chopwell	County Durham	North East		Coal				?	
Cirencester	Cirencester	Gloucestershire	West Midlands	51°43′13″N 1°58′31″W	Gas engines	0.1	1912	1931		
City Road	Finsbury	Islington	Greater London	51°31′48″N 0°05′50″W	Coal	12.225	1896	1929	yes	
Clacton	Clacton	Essex	East		Coal	2.15		1967		
Clarence Dock	Liverpool	Liverpool City Region	North West	53°25′09″N 3°00′07″W	Coal & oil	267.5	1931	1980s		
Cliff Quay	Ipswich	Suffolk	East	52°02′09″N 1°09′28″E	Coal	276		1984	1994	
Colchester	Colchester	Essex	East	51°52′59″N 0°55′35″E	Coal	7.5	1900	1960		
Commercial Road Stage 1	Wolverhampton	West Midlands	West Midlands	52°34′54″N 2°06′54″W	Coal	0.35	1895	(stage 2)	1977	
Commercial Road Stage 2	Wolverhampton	West Midlands	West Midlands	52°34′54″N 2°06′54″W	Coal	6	1908	(stage 3)	1977	
Commercial Road Stage 3	Wolverhampton	West Midlands	West Midlands	52°34′54″N 2°06′54″W	Coal	23	1925	1970s	1977	
Consett Central	Consett	County Durham	North East	54°51′00″N 1°50′55″W	Coal		1955	1980	1980s	
Coventry	Coventry	West Midlands	Midlands	52°25′03″N 1°30′43″W	Coal	25.2	1895		converted to residential commercial use	
Coventry (Longford)	Longford	West Midlands	Midlands	52°27′23″N 1°28′03″W	Coal	130.75	1928	1976	Yes	
Cowes	Cowes	Isle of Wight	South		Coal	38				
Knitsley Lane	Consett	County Durham	North East	54°51′00″N 1°50′55″W	Coal		1903	1906	Yes	
Templetown	Consett	County Durham	North East	54°51′00″N 1°50′55″W	Coal		1906	1961	yes	
Corby	Corby	Northamptonshire	East Midlands	52°30′13″N 0°42′15″W	CCGT	401	1994			
Coryton	Thurrock	Essex	East	51°30′43″N 0°30′29″E	CCGT	732	2002			
CDCL (Cottam Development Centre)	Cottam	Nottinghamshire	East Midlands	53°18′14″N 0°46′53″W	CCGT	400	1999			
Cottam	Cottam	Nottinghamshire	East Midlands	53°18′14″N 0°46′53″W	Coal	2,000	1968	2019	2025	
Cotton Valley Sewage Works 1	Milton Keynes	Buckinghamshire	South East	52°3′27″N 0°42′32″W	Biogas	0.763	2005			
Cowes	Cowes	Isle of Wight	South East		OCGT	140	1982			
Croydon A	Purley	Croydon	Greater London	51°22′44″N 0°07′16″W	Coal	50	1896	1973	yes	
Croydon B	Purley	Croydon	Greater London	51°22′44″N 0°07′16″W	Coal	338	1950	1984	Partly	Two large chimneys are retained.
Croydon Gas Turbine	Purley	Croydon	Greater London	51°22′35″N 0°06′59″W	Gas	80	1999			
Damhead Creek 1	Hoo Peninsula	Kent	South East	51°25′31″N 0°36′00″E	CCGT	792	2001			
Damhead Creek 2	Hoo Peninsula	Kent	South East	51°25′31″N 0°36′00″E	CCGT	1,000				
Darlington A (Haughton Road)	Darlington	County Durham	North East	54°31′43″N 1°32′44″W	Coal		1900	1930s	1982	
Darlington B	Darlington	County Durham	North East	54°31′43″N 1°32′44″W	Coal	57	1940	1976	1982	
Deptford East	Deptford	Greater London	Greater London	51°28′57″N 0°01′13″W	Coal	0.8	1891	1957	yes	
Deptford West	Deptford	Greater London	Greater London	51°28′57″N 0°01′13″W	Coal	158	1929	1983	1992	
Derby	Derby	Derbyshire	Midlands	52°55′33″N 1°28′35″W	Coal	65.5	1893	1969	1971–1972	
Derwent	Spondon	Derbyshire	East Midlands	52°54′23″N 1°24′03″W	CCGT	214	1995			
Derwenthaugh Coke Works	Swalwell	Tyne and Wear	North East		Coal + waste heat		1928	1986	1987–1989	
Didcot A	Didcot	Oxfordshire	South East	51°37′25″N 1°16′03″W	Coal + biomass	2,109	1970	2013	2014–2020	
Didcot B	Didcot	Oxfordshire	South East	51°37′25″N 1°16′03″W	CCGT	1,550	1997			
Didcot OCGT	Didcot	Oxfordshire	South East	51°37′25″N 1°16′03″W	OCGT	100	1970			
Doncaster A	Doncaster	South Yorkshire	Yorkshire and the Humber	53°31′34″N 1°08′18″W	Coal	8.35	1900	1958	Yes	
Doncaster B	Doncaster	South Yorkshire	Yorkshire and the Humber	53°31′27″N 1°08′46″W	Coal	122	1953	1983	Yes	HM Prison Doncaster is now on the site of the old power station.
Downton	Salisbury	Wiltshire	South West	50°59′32″N 1°44′43″W	Diesel	0.082		1972-1978		Station was diesel engine and hydro-electric.
Drakelow A	Burton upon Trent	Derbyshire	East Midlands	52°46′25″N 1°39′24″W	Coal	240	1955	1984	Yes	
Drakelow B	Burton upon Trent	Derbyshire	East Midlands	52°46′25″N 1°39′24″W	Coal	480	1959	1993	1998 (cooling towers)	
Drakelow C	Burton upon Trent	Derbyshire	East Midlands	52°46′25″N 1°39′24″W	Coal	1,450	1964	2003	2005-06	
Drax	Selby	North Yorkshire	Yorkshire and the Humber	53°44′7″N 0°59′31″W	Biomass (2.64GW) + coal (1.32GW)	3,960	1974			Largest power station in the UK
Dudley	Dudley	West Midlands	West Midlands		Coal	2.9	1899	Late 1920s		
Dungeness A1	Dungeness	Kent	South East	50°54′50″N 0°57′50″E	Nuclear (magnox)	285	1965	2006		
Dungeness A2	Dungeness	Kent	South East	50°54′50″N 0°57′50″E	Nuclear (magnox)	285	1965	2006		
Dungeness B1	Dungeness	Kent	South East	50°54′50″N 0°57′50″E	Nuclear (AGR)	660	1983	2021		
Dunston A	Dunston	Tyne and Wear	North East	54°57′02″N 1°39′26″W	Coal	30	1910	1932	1986	
Dunston B	Dunston	Tyne and Wear	North East	54°57′02″N 1°39′26″W	Coal	300	1951	1981	1986	
Earley	Earley	Berkshire	South East		Coal	114	1942	1975?	1982	
Earley	Earley	Berkshire	South East		Diesel-fired gas turbine	111	1965	1982	1982	
Eastbourne	Eastbourne	Sussex	South East		Coal	9		1967		
East Yelland	Yelland	Devon	South West		Coal + diesel	170	1955	1984		
Edmonton EcoPark	Edmonton	London	South East	51°36′57″N 0°02′29″W	Waste		1971			
Eggborough	Eggborough	North Yorkshire	Yorkshire and the Humber	53°42′42″N 1°07′37″W	Coal	1,960	1967	2018	2021 (cooling towers)	4 units + 2 OCGT
Elean	Sutton	Cambridgeshire	East		Biomass (straw)	38	2000			
Elland	Elland	West Yorkshire	Yorkshire and the Humber	53°41′40″N 1°49′22″W	Coal	180	1959	1991	1996	3×60 MW
Ely	Ely	Cambridgeshire	East		Biomass (straw)					
Enfield	Brimsdown	London Borough of Enfield	Greater London	51°39′46″N 0°01′22″W	CCGT	392	1999			
Eston Grange	Eston Grange	Redcar and Cleveland	North East		Coal	800				
Exeter	Exeter	Devon	South West		Coal	12	1905	1955		
Eye	Eye	Suffolk	East		Biomass (poultry litter)	13	1992			World's first poultry litter fuelled power plant
Farnborough	Farnborough	Hampshire	South		Gas engine	0.80		1958		
Fawley	Fawley	Hampshire	South East	50°49′00″N 1°19′44″W	Oil	968	1971	2013	2019–2023	4×500 MW
Fellside	Sellafield	Cumbria	North West	54°25′14″N 3°29′51″W	Gas CHP	180	1993			
Ferrybridge A	Ferrybridge	West Yorkshire	Yorkshire and the Humber	53°43′03″N 1°16′50″W	Coal	125	1927	1976	partly	
Ferrybridge B	Ferrybridge	West Yorkshire	Yorkshire and the Humber	53°43′03″N 1°16′50″W	Coal	300	1959	1992	yes	3×100 MW
Ferrybridge C	Ferrybridge	West Yorkshire	Yorkshire and the Humber	53°43′03″N 1°16′50″W	Coal	2,000	1966	2016	Yes	4×500 MW
Ferrybridge OCGT	Ferrybridge	West Yorkshire	Yorkshire and the Humber	53°43′03″N 1°16′50″W	OCGT	34	1966			2×17 MW
Fiddlers Ferry	Widnes – Warrington	Cheshire	North West	53°22′19″N 2°41′13″W	Coal + biomass	1,989	1971	2020		4×500 MW
Finchley	Finchley	London	Greater London		Coal	4.7		1958		
Fleetwood	Fleetwood	Lancashire	North West	53°54′43″N 3°0′40″W	Coal	0.96/ 90	1900/ 1955	?/ 1981	>1980	2 stations
Folkestone	Folkestone	Kent	South East	51°05′08″N 1°09′05″E	Coal, fuel oil	7.12	1898	1960		
Forth Banks Stage 1	Newcastle upon Tyne	Tyne and Wear	North East	54°57′57″N 1°36′59″W	Coal	0.15	1890	Stage 2	1910s	The first power station in the world to use turbo alternators. 2×75 kW.
Forth Banks Stage 2	Newcastle upon Tyne	Tyne and Wear	North East	54°57′57″N 1°36′59″W	Coal	2.4	Stage 1	1907	1910s	3×500 kW + 6×150 kW
Foss Island	York	North Yorkshire	Yorkshire and the Humber	53°57′36″N 1°04′05″W	Coal	38	1900	1976		
Frome	Frome	Somerset	South		Coal	2.35				
Fulham	Fulham	London	Greater London	51°28′11″N 0°11′00″W	Coal	310	1901	1978	1980s	
Glanford Brigg	Brigg	North Lincolnshire	Yorkshire and the Humber	53°32′26″N 0°30′13″W	CCGT	268	1993			See also Brigg and Glanford biomass
Glanford Biomass	Scunthorpe	North Lincolnshire	Yorkshire and the Humber	53°37′19″N 0°42′01″W	Biomass (poultry litter)	13.5	1993			See also Brigg and Glanford Brigg
Goldington	Bedford	Bedfordshire	East	52°08′15″N 0°25′39″W	Coal	180	1954	1983	1984–1987	
Grain CCGT	Grain	Kent	South East	51°26′43″N 0°42′54″E	CCGT	1,275	2010			3×425 MW
Grain Oil	Grain	Kent	South East	51°26′43″N 0°42′54″E	Oil	1,300	1979	2012	2015–2016	4×690 MW, 2 units mothballed 2002 and 2003
Gravesend	Gravesend	Kent	South East	51°26′32″N 0°22′59″E	Coal	12	1903	1969	1995	
Great Yarmouth A	Great Yarmouth	Norfolk	East	52°35′02″N 1°44′00″E	Coal	?	1894	1961	1961	
Great Yarmouth B	Great Yarmouth	Norfolk	East	52°35′02″N 1°44′00″E	Coal, oil	252	1958	1994	1997	
Great Yarmouth CCGT	Great Yarmouth	Norfolk	East	52°35′02″N 1°44′00″E	CCGT	420	2001			
Greenhill	Oldham	Greater Manchester	North West	53°32′22″N 2°06′12″W	Coal	17.2	1921	1960	yes	See also Rhodes Bank
Greenwich	Greenwich	Greater London	Greater London	51°29′06″N 0°00′03″W	Oil, gas	117.6	1902			Over 100 years old and still used as standby
Grimsby	Grimsby	Lincolnshire	Yorkshire and the Humber	53°33′47″N 0°04′57″W	Coal + fuel oil	38	1901	late 1960s	yes	
Grove Road	Marylebone	Westminster	Greater London	51°31′39″N 0°10′15″W	Coal	80.25	1902	1969	yes	
Guildford	Guildford	Surrey	South East	51°14′46″N 0°34′42″W	Coal	11.25	1928	1968		
Hackney A	Lea Bridge	Hackney	Greater London	51°33′31″N 0°02′24″W	Coal	?	1901	?	Partially	
Hackney B	Lea Bridge	Hackney	Greater London	51°33′31″N 0°02′24″W	Coal	92	1957	1976	Partially	
Halifax	Halifax	West Yorkshire	Yorkshire and the Humber	53°43′34″N 1°51′26″W	Coal	48.3	1894	1960s	yes	
Hammersmith	Hammersmith	Hammersmith and Fulham	Greater London	51°29′24″N 0°13′18″W	Coal	20	1897	1965	yes	
Hams Hall A	Birmingham	Warwickshire	West Midlands	52°31′29″N 1°42′19″W	Coal	240	1928	1975	1978	
Hams Hall B	Birmingham	Warwickshire	West Midlands	52°31′29″N 1°42′19″W	Coal	306	1942	1981	1988	
Hams Hall C	Birmingham	Warwickshire	West Midlands	52°31′29″N 1°42′19″W	Coal	357	1958	1992	1993	6 generators
Handsworth	Handsworth	West Midlands	West Midlands	52°30′06″N 1°55′35″W	Coal	1.05	1905	c. 1912		
Hanley	Stoke-on-Trent	Staffordshire	West Midlands	53°01′2″N 02°10′21″W	Coal	0.624	1894	1964		
Harrogate	Harrogate	North Yorkshire	Yorkshire and the Humber	54°00′03″N 1°33′17″W	Coal	15.9	1897	1960		
Hartlepool	Seaton Carew	County Durham	North East	54°38′06″N 1°10′51″W	Nuclear (AGR)	1,210	1983			
Hartshead	Heyrod	Greater Manchester	North West	53°29′29″N 2°2′43″W	Coal	64 (134.75 MW in 1971)	1926	1979	1980s	
Hastings	Hastings	East Sussex	South East	50°52′07″N 0°35′39″E	Gas	110	1966	1980s	2003	2 generating sets
Hatfield	Stainforth	South Yorkshire	Yorkshire and the Humber		CCGT/IGCC	900	2016			Project frozen
Hayle	Hayle	Cornwall	South West		Coal	38		1977		
Hereford	Hereford	Herefordshire	West Midlands	52°03′32″N 2°42′58″W	Coal	4.6	1899	1939		
Heron	Immingham Docks	North East Lincolnshire	Yorkshire and the Humber		Biomass	290	TBD			
Heysham 1	Heysham	Lancashire	North West	54°01′44″N 2°54′58″W	Nuclear (AGR)	1,150	1983			
Heysham 2	Heysham	Lancashire	North West	54°01′44″N 2°54′58″W	Nuclear (AGR)	1,250	1988			
High Marnham	Dunham	Nottinghamshire	East Midlands	53°13′44″N 0°47′33″W	Coal	945	1959	2003	2012	
High Wycombe	High Wycombe	Buckinghamshire	South		Coal	3.96				
Hinkley Point A	Hinkley Point	Somerset	South West	51°12′31″N 3°08′01″W	Nuclear (magnox)	470	1957	2000		2×nuclear (magnox)
Hinkley Point B	Hinkley Point	Somerset	South West	51°12′33″N 3°07′39″W	Nuclear (AGR)	1,220	1976	2022		2×AGR
Hinkley Point C	Hinkley Point	Somerset	South West	51°12′31″N 3°08′01″W	Nuclear (PWR)	3,200	2030?			2×EPR
Holborn Viaduct	Holborn	London	Greater London	51°31′02″N 0°6′18″W	Coal	0.093	1882	1886	1886	First coal power station
Horden	Horden	County Durham	North East	54°46′06″N 1°18′52″W	Coal	2.6	1926	1906?	1987	
Horden	Horden	County Durham	North East	54°46′06″N 1°18′52″W	Waste heat, gas from coke works	6	1934	before 1971		
Hounslow	Hounslow	London	Greater London	51°28′10″N 0°20′53″W	Coal / diesel	4.15	1904	1964	yes	
Huddersfield	Huddersfield	West Yorkshire	North East	53°39′09″N 1°46′26″W	Coal	94	1893	1981	Yes	
Huncoat	Accrington	Lancashire	North West	53°46′34″N 2°20′16″W	Coal	150	1956	1984	Partly - Admin block still stands	5×30 MW units
Immingham	Immingham Docks	North East Lincolnshire	Yorkshire and the Humber	53°38′18″N 0°14′00″W	CCGT	1,240	2004			CHP (provides heat for the refinery)
Ince A	Ellesmere Port	Cheshire	North West	53°16′42″N 2°48′30″W	Coal	240	1957	1980s	1980s	4×60 MW. Main use for power local uranium enrichment industry.
Ince B	Ellesmere Port	Cheshire	North West		Oil	1,050	1984	1997	1999	2×500 MW + 2×25 MW OCGT
Ipswich	Ipswich	Suffolk	East		Coal	17.25		1967		
Ironbridge A	Ironbridge	Shropshire	West Midlands	52°37′48″N 2°30′43″W	Coal	200	1932	1981	1983-Pump house and bridge still stands	
Ironbridge B	Ironbridge	Shropshire	West Midlands	52°37′48″N 2°30′43″W	Coal	1,000	1969	2015	2019–2020	2×500 MW
Islington	Islington	Islington	Greater London		Coal	22		1969		
Keadby CCGT	Scunthorpe	North Lincolnshire	Yorkshire and the Humber	53°35′40″N 0°45′02″W	CCGT	720	1996			
Keadby Coal	Scunthorpe	North Lincolnshire	Yorkshire and the Humber	53°35′40″N 0°45′02″W	Coal	360	1952	1984	Yes	
Kearsley	Kearsley	Greater Manchester	North West	53°32′22″N 2°21′33″W	Coal	272	1929	1980	1985	(Kearsley A-C)
Kendal	Kendal	Cumbria	North West		Oil engine	5				
Kidderminster	Kidderminster	Worcestershire	West Midlands	52°22′58″N 2°15′04″W	Coal	3	1898	late 1920s	yes	
Killingholme A	Killingholme	North Lincolnshire	Yorkshire and the Humber	53°39′34″N 0°15′18″W	CCGT	625	1994			
Killingholme B	Killingholme	North Lincolnshire	Yorkshire and the Humber	53°39′15″N 0°15′19″W	CCGT	900	1993			
King's Lynn	King's Lynn	Norfolk	East	52°43′38″N 0°22′48″E	CCGT	325	1997			
Kingsnorth	Medway	Kent	South East	51°25′08″N 0°36′10″E	Coal + oil + biofuel	2,000	1970	2012	2014–2018	4 units, 10% biofuel capacity
Kingston	Kingston upon Thames	Greater London	Greater London	51°24′55″N 0°18′22″W	Coal	117	1893	1980	Yes	
Kirkstall	Leeds	West Yorkshire	Yorkshire and the Humber	53°48′15″N 1°35′33″W	Coal	200	?	1976	Yes	
Knapton	East Knapton	North Yorkshire	North East	54°10′52″N 0°38′31″W	OCGT	42	1995			
Lancaster	Lancaster	Lancashire	North West	54°04′03″N 2°47′19″W	Coal	49	1894	1976	yes	
Langage	Plymouth	Devon	South West	50°23′18″N 4°00′42″W	CCGT	878	2010			2×452.5 MW
Ledbury	Ledbury	Herefordshire	West Midlands	52°02′16″N 2°25′38″W	Gas & oil engines	0.07	1913	1930		
Leeds (Whitehall Road)	Leeds	Yorkshire	Yorkshire	53°47′43″N 1°33′07″W	Coal	37	1893	about 1965	yes	
Leek	Leek	Staffordshire	West Midlands	53°06′11″N 2°01′53″W	Gas & diesel engines	0.86	1904	1951		
Leicester	Leicester	Leicestershire	East Midlands	52°37′11″N 1°08′36″W	Coal (part oil)	131	1922	1976	yes	There were two earlier stations.
Leicester	Leicester	Leicestershire	East Midlands		OCGT	102	1976	1990	yes	
Lemington	Lemington	Tyne and Wear	North East	54°58′27″N 1°42′37″W	Coal	0.97	1903	1919	1949 (partially)	
Leominster	Leominster	Herefordshire	West Midlands	52°13′40″N 2°44′27″W	Gas engines	0.06	1912	1922		
Letchworth	Letchworth	Hertfordshire	East		Coal	12 & 14.5		1967 & 1973	Yes	A & B stations
Lincoln	Lincoln	Lincolnshire	Midlands	53°13′39″N 0°31′26″W	Coal	76	1898	1977	2007	
Lister Drive	Liverpool	Liverpool City Region	North West	53°25′10″N 2°55′53″W	Coal, gas turbine (fuel oil)	70 110	1900 1965	1960s 1980	1980s 1994	
Little Barford A	Little Barford	Bedfordshire	East	52°12′17″N 0°16′02″W	Coal	120	1939	1981	1989	
Little Barford B	Little Barford	Bedfordshire	East	52°12′17″N 0°16′02″W	CCGT	680	1996			Regenesys site
Littlebrook A	Dartford	Kent	South East	51°27′55″N 0°14′30″E	Coal + oil	120	1939	1973	?	
Littlebrook B	Dartford	Kent	South East	51°27′55″N 0°14′30″E	Coal + oil	120	1949	1975	?	
Littlebrook C	Dartford	Kent	South East	51°27′55″N 0°14′30″E	Coal + oil	240	1956	1981	?	
Littlebrook D	Dartford	Kent	South East	51°27′55″N 0°14′30″E	Oil	1,370	1981	2015	2019	Strategic Cold War station. 3×685 MW.
Littlebrook D OCGT	Dartford	Kent	South East	51°27′55″N 0°14′30″E	OCGT	105	1981			3×35 MW OCGT, each comprising 2×RR Concorde Gts
Lombard Road	Battersea	Battersea	Greater London	51°28′16″N 0°10′37″W	Coal	50	1901	1972	Yes	
Longton	Stoke-on-Trent	Staffordshire	West Midlands	52°59′21″N 2°08′22″W			1901			
Lots Road	Lots Road	Chelsea	Greater London	51°28′40″N 0°10′53″W	Coal + oil + gas	1,800	1905	2002	?	Commercial development planned on the site
Ludlow	Ludlow	Shropshire	West Midlands	52°22′12″N 2°43′00″W	Gas engines & hydro	0.07	1906	1927		
Luton	Luton	Bedfordshire	East	51°52′45″N 0°24′34″W	Coal, oil	23	1901	1969	1972	
Lydney	Lydney	Gloucestershire	West Midlands	51°44′10″N 2°32′19″W	Coal	17.5	1923	1967		
Lymington	Lymington	Hampshire	South	50°45′27″N 1°32′04″W	Coal, oil engine	1.5, 0.49	1899	1959	yes	
Lynemouth	Lynemouth	Northumberland	North East	55°12′15″N 1°31′20″W	Coal + biomass	420	1972			
Macclesfield	Macclesfield	Cheshire	North West		Oil engine	2	1901	1960s		
Maidstone	Maidstone	Kent	South East		Coal	13.125	1901		1973	
Malvern	Malvern	Worcestershire	West Midlands	52°06′49″N 2°18′34″W	Refuse	0.4	1904	1948		
Manchester	–	–	–	–	–	–	–	–	–	See Bloom Street and Stuart Street stations
Manors	Newcastle upon Tyne	Tyne and Wear	North East	54°58′18″N 1°36′23″W	Coal		1901	1936		Grade II listed, converted into a church
Marchwood A	Marchwood	Hampshire	South East	50°53′54″N 1°26′13″W	Oil	480	1953	1983–1984		8×60
Marchwood B	Marchwood	Hampshire	South East	50°53′54″N 1°26′13″W	CCGT	840	2009			
Market Drayton	Market Drayton	Shropshire	West Midlands	52°54′09″N 2°28′54″W	Coal	0.26	1902	1954		
Meaford A	Meaford	Staffordshire	West Midlands	52°55′33″N 2°09′59″W	Coal	120	1948	1974	1982	4×30 MW
Meaford B	Meaford	Staffordshire	West Midlands	52°55′33″N 2°09′59″W	Coal	240	1957	1991	1996	4×60 MW
Medway	Medway	Kent	South East	51°26′00″N 0°41′00″E	CCGT	700	1995			2×226.7 MW
Mexborough	Mexborough	South Yorkshire	Yorkshire and the Humber	53°29′37″N 1°15′49″W	Coal	120	1950s	1981	1988	4×30 MW
Neasden	Neasden	Greater London	Greater London	51°33′35″N 0°15′41″W	Coal	?	1904	1968	?	
Nechells power stations A & B	Nechells	Birmingham	West Midlands	52°30′05″N 1°51′31″W	Coal	A: 117.75 B: 212	A: 1923 B: 1951	A: 1969 B: 1982		
Neepsend	Neepsend	South Yorkshire	Yorkshire and the Humber	53°24′19″N 1°29′08″W	Coal	160	1910	1976	yes	
Nelson	Nelson	Lancashire	North West	53°50′37″N 2°12′51″W	Coal	12.75	1893	1960	yes	Originally providing only 43KW. Sub station remains.
Neptune Bank	Wallsend	Tyne and Wear	North East	54°59′01″N 1°31′55″W	Coal	4.5	1901	Yes	Yes	
Newburn Steelworks	Newburn	Tyne and Wear	North East		Coal	2.75	1908	1924		
Newbury	Newbury	Berkshire	South	51°24′07″N 1°18′53″W	Diesel engine & hydro	2.57	1905	c. 1970	yes	Also hydro station
Newcastle-under-Lyme	Newcastle-under-Lyme	Staffordshire	West Midlands	53°00′29″N 2°13′37″W	Diesel engines	0.65	1921	c. 1955		
Newman Spinney	Chesterfield	Derbyshire	East Midlands		Gas from underground gasification	3.75	1958	1959	Yes	National Coal Board abandoned gasification project
Newton Abbot	Newton Abbot	Devon	South West		Coal	35		1974		
North Blyth Biomass Project	Blyth	Northumberland	North East		Biomass (various)	100	2015			
North Tees A	Billingham	County Durham	North East	54°35′13″N 1°15′47″W	Coal	40	1921		Yes	
North Tees B	Billingham	County Durham	North East	54°35′13″N 1°15′47″W	Coal				Yes	
North Tees C	Billingham	County Durham	North East	54°35′13″N 1°15′47″W	Coal	120	1949	1983	1987	
Northampton	Northampton	Northamptonshire	East Midlands	52°13′52″N 0°53′09″W	Coal	130	1920s	1975		Planning has been granted for University of Northampton to build on this site.
Northfleet	Gravesham	Kent	South East		Coal	720	1963	1991	1994	Converted to oil firing 1972
North Wilford	—	—	—	—	—	—	—	—	—	See Wilford power station
Norwich	Norwich	Norfolk	East	52°37′15″N 1°19′06″E	Coal	73.5	1922	1975	1982	
Norwich	Norwich	Norfolk	East	52°37′15″N 1°19′06″E	Oil (gas turbine)	110	1966	1986	Yes	
Nottingham	Nottingham	Nottinghamshire	East Midlands	52°55′55″N 1°10′01″W	Coal	148	1925	1981		Also known as Wilford or North Wilford
Ocker Hill	Tipton	Staffordshire	West Midlands		Coal + gas turbine	Gas turbine=280	1902	1977	1985	GT plant extant 1981
Oldbury nuclear power station	Oldbury	South Gloucestershire	South West	51°38′56″N 2°34′15″W	Nuclear (magnox)	470	1967	2012		
Oswestry	Oswestry	Shropshire	West Midlands	52°51′33″N 3°03′11″W	Coal	0.4	1895	1936		
Oxford (or Osney)	Oxford	Oxfordshire	South East	51°45′05″N 1°16′19″W	Coal (1892–1963), oil (1963–1969)	22 (1965)	1892	1969	No	Building later used by University of Oxford
Padiham A (Stage 1)	Padiham	Lancashire	North West	53°47′44″N 2°19′39″W	Coal	12	1926	Stage 2	Yes	2×6 MW
Padiham A (Stage 2)	Padiham	Lancashire	North West	53°47′44″N 2°19′39″W	Coal	24.5	1929	Stage 3	Yes	Addition of 1×12.5 MW
Padiham A (Stage 3)	Padiham	Lancashire	North West	53°47′44″N 2°19′39″W	Coal	49.5	1940	1969	Yes	Addition of 2×12.5 MW
Padiham B	Padiham	Lancashire	North West	53°47′44″N 2°19′39″W	Coal	240	1957	1993	Yes	
Pandon Dene	Newcastle upon Tyne	Tyne and Wear	North East		Coal	0.15	1890	1902	Yes	
Percival Lane	Runcorn	Cheshire	North West	53°20′15″N 2°45′07″W	Coal	115	1921		Yes	
Peterborough	Peterborough	Cambridgeshire	East		Coal	57		1976		
Peterborough	Peterborough	Cambridgeshire	East	52°34′37″N 0°12′14″W	CCGT	405	1993			
Philadelphia	Philadelphia	Tyne and Wear	North East	54°51′42″N 1°28′52″W	Coal		1905	Yes		Grade II listed. This site has been refurbished as the Philadelphia Complex.
Plymouth	Plymouth	Devon	South West		Oil + diesel	205	1899	1981	1992	
Poole	Poole	Dorset	South West	50°42′56″N 1°59′46″W	Oil	305	1950		1993	
Poplar (Watts Grove and Glaucus Street)	Poplar	Tower Hamlets	Greater London		Coal	25	1900	1967		
Portbury Dock	Portbury	North Somerset	South West		Biomass	150	2012			
Portishead A	Portishead	Somerset	South West	51°29′28″N 2°45′18″W	Coal	240	1929	1976	1982	The site is now occupied by housing and the dock has become a marina.
Portishead B	Portishead	Somerset	South West	51°29′28″N 2°45′18″W	Coal + oil	298	1955	1982	1992	The site is now occupied by housing and the dock has become a marina.
Portsmouth	Portsmouth	Hampshire	South West	50°47′36″N 1°06′11″W	Coal	140	1894	1977	1981	
Portrack	Billingham	County Durham	North East	54°34′16″N 1°16′00″W	Waste	20	1977	1996	1998–2000	
Preston (Crown Street)	Preston	Lancashire	North West	53°45′53″N 2°42′11″W	Coal	3.97	1891	>1924		Replaced by Ribble power station
Radcliffe	Radcliffe	Greater Manchester	North West	53°33′13″N 2°20′22″W	Coal	3	1905	1959	?	
Ramsgate	Ramsgate	Kent	South	51°20′31″N 1°24′34″E	Coal	2.25	1905	1958	yes	sub-station on site
Ratcliffe-on-Soar	Ratcliffe-on-Soar	Nottinghamshire	East Midlands	52°51′55″N 1°15′18″W	Coal	2021	1968	2024		4×500 MW
Rawtenstall	Rawtenstall	Lancashire	North West	53°41′46″N 2°15′55″W	Coal	12.5		1958		In 1916 a transmission line installed to Accrington, so that both stations could supply Haslingden. A significant part of the building still exists.
Reading	Reading	Berkshire	South	51°27′42″N 0°58′18″W	Coal	10.7	1895	1960s	yes	
Redditch	Redditch	Worcestershire	West Midlands	52°17′44″N 3°24′17″W	Gas engines, coal	4.5	1899	Early 1930s		
Rhodes Bank	Oldham	Lancashire	North West	53°32′24″N 2°06′22″W	Coal	0.657	1894	1920	yes	See Greenhill power station
Ribble A	Preston	Lancashire	North West	53°45′26″N 2°43′41″W	Coal	50	1924		1982	4×12.5 MW
Ribble B	Preston	Lancashire	North West	53°45′26″N 2°43′41″W	Coal	126	1943	1976	1982	4×31.5 MW
Richborough	Richborough	Kent	South East	51°18′36″N 1°20′55″E	Coal + oil	360	1962	1996	2012	
Rochdale	Rochdale	Greater Manchester	North West	53°36′53″N 2°09′58″W	Coal	10.7	1901	1958	yes	
Rocksavage	Runcorn	Cheshire	North West	53°18′56″N 2°43′31″W	CCGT	810	1998			3×270 MW CCGT
Roosecote A	Roosecote	Cumbria	North West	54°06′18″N 3°11′16″W	Coal	120	1954	1986	?	
Roosecote B	Roosecote	Cumbria	North West	54°06′18″N 3°11′16″W	CCGT	229	1991	2012	2015	The first CCGT in the UK
Roosecote	Roosecote	Cumbria	North West	54°06′18″N 3°11′16″W	Battery storage	49	2018			
Ross-on-Wye	Ross-on-Wye	Herefordshire	West Midlands	51°54′57″N 2°34′53″W	Coal	0.1	1902	1930s		
Rotherham	Rotherham	South Yorkshire	Yorkshire and the Humber	53°26′08″N 1°21′26″W	Coal	56	1923	1978	1978–1979	
Rugeley A	Rugeley	Staffordshire	West Midlands	52°45′25″N 1°54′59″W	Coal	600	1963	1995	1995	5×120 MW
Rugeley B	Rugeley	Staffordshire	West Midlands	52°45′25″N 1°54′59″W	Coal	1,006	1970	2016	2021	2×500 MW
Runcorn	Weston Point, Runcorn	Cheshire	North West	53°19′46″N 2°45′15″W	Waste	83.8	2014			Generates electricity and heat for nearby Ineos Chlor chemical plant
Rye House A	Hoddesdon	Hertfordshire	East	51°45′45″N 0°00′39″E	Coal	120	1953	1982	<1993	
Rye House B	Hoddesdon	Hertfordshire	East	51°45′45″N 0°00′39″E	CCGT	715	1993			(3×178 + 1×295 MW) CCGT
Salisbury	Salisbury	Wiltshire	South	51°04′09″N 1°47′52″W	Coal	2.9	1898	1970	redeveloped	
Salt End	Salt End	East Yorkshire	Yorkshire and the Humber	53°44′39″N 0°14′02″W	CCGT	1,100	1999			3×367 MW CCGT
Scarborough	Scarborough	North Yorkshire	Yorkshire and the Humber	54°16′19″N 0°25′02″W	Coal	9.375	1893	1958	yes	
Sculcoates	Sculcoates	Hull	North East	53°45′49″N 0°20′42″W	Coal	122	1898	1976	Yes	
Seabank 1	Bristol	Bristol	South West	51°32′24″N 2°40′08″W	CCGT	820	1998			3×273.3 MW
Seabank 2	Bristol	Bristol	South West	51°32′24″N 2°40′08″W	CCGT	1,145	2000			1×414 MW
Seal Sands	Seal Sands	County Durham	North East	54°36′24″N 1°12′10″W	OCGT	50	1997			1×50 MW
Sellafield CHP	Seascale	Cumbria	North West	54°25′14″N 3°29′51″W	CCGT	155	1993			(3×37 + 1×44) MW CCGT
Sevington	Sevington	Kent	South East	51°03′56″N 0°51′45″E	Gas engine	10	2002			
Sheffield	–	–	–	–	–	–	–	–	–	See Blackburn Meadows and Neepsend
Shoreditch	Shoreditch	London	Greater London		Coal	24.5				
Shoreham A	Southwick	West Sussex	South East	50°49′46″N 0°13′50″W	Coal	53	1904	1976	1988	
Shoreham B	Southwick	West Sussex	South East	50°49′46″N 0°13′50″W	Coal	342	1958	Yes	1998	
Shoreham C	Southwick	West Sussex	South East	50°49′46″N 0°13′50″W	CCGT	420	2000			
Shorts Gardens	Covent Garden	London	Greater London		Diesel engines	2.8	1896	1962		
Shrewsbury	Shrewsbury	Shropshire	West Midlands	52°42′34″N 2°45′12″W	Coal	2	1895	1956		
Sizewell A	Sizewell	Suffolk	East	52°12′54″N 1°37′11″E	Nuclear (magnox)	650	1966	2006		
Sizewell B	Sizewell	Suffolk	East	52°12′54″N 1°37′11″E	Nuclear (PWR)	1,190	1995			Licensed until 2035, EDF looking to extend to 2055
Sizewell C	Sizewell	Suffolk	East	52°12′54″N 1°37′11″E	Nuclear (PWR)	3,200	Mid-to-late 2030s			2×EPR
Skelton Grange A	Leeds	West Yorkshire	Yorkshire and the Humber		Coal	360	1948	1983		
Skelton Grange B	Leeds	West Yorkshire	Yorkshire and the Humber		Coal	448	1960	1994		
Skelton Grange Biogas	Leeds	West Yorkshire	Yorkshire and the Humber	53°46′13″N 1°26′47″W	Biogas	1.7	2006			Landfill plant
Sleaford	Sleaford	Lincolnshire	East Midlands	52°59′58″N 0°22′59″W	Biomass (straw)	40	2014			
Slough Heat and Power	Slough	Berkshire	South East	51°31′30″N 0°37′46″W	Biomass (wood chips and waste paper...)	47	1920s			
Smethwick	Smethwick	West Midlands	West Midlands		Coal	31.625	1904	1949		
South Denes	–	–	–	–	–	–	–	–	–	See Great Yarmouth
South Humber Bank 1	Stallingborough	North East Lincolnshire	Yorkshire and the Humber	53°36′05″N 0°08′47″W	CCGT	769	1996			(3×169 + 1×162) MW
South Humber Bank 2	Stallingborough	North East Lincolnshire	Yorkshire and the Humber	53°36′05″N 0°08′47″W	CCGT	516	1998			(2×174 + 1×168) MW
South Shields	South Shields	Tyne and Wear	North East	54°59′27″N 1°26′42″W	Coal	10.5	1893	1958	yes	
South Shore Road	Gateshead	Tyne and Wear	North East		Coal	?	?	Yes	Yes	
Southend	Southend-on-Sea	Essex	East		Petrol/diesel	5.65		1966		
Southport	Southport	Liverpool City Region	North West	53°38′39″N 2°57′47″W	Coal	17.25			yes	
Spa Road	Lincoln	Lincolnshire	East Midlands		Coal	?	1894	1917?	yes	
Spalding	Spalding	Lincolnshire	East Midlands	52°48′28″N 0°07′56″W	CCGT	880	2004			(2×252 + 1×366) MW
Spondon	Spondon	Derbyshire	East Midlands	52°54′23″N 1°24′03″W	Coal	18	1920s	1982	yes	
Stafford	Stafford	Staffordshire	Midlands	52°48′31″N 2°07′18″W	Coal	6	1895	1958	yes	
Staythorpe A	Southwell	Nottinghamshire	East Midlands	53°04′29″N 0°51′21″W	Coal	112	1950	1983	Yes	
Staythorpe B	Southwell	Nottinghamshire	East Midlands	53°04′29″N 0°51′21″W	Coal	354	1962	1994	Yes	
Staythorpe C	Southwell	Nottinghamshire	East Midlands	53°04′29″N 0°51′21″W	CCGT	1,650	2010			4×420 MW
Stallingborough Biomass	Stallingborough	North East Lincolnshire,	Yorkshire and the Humber	53°35′00″N 0°11′01″W	Biomass	65	2011			
Stella North	Lemington	Tyne and Wear	North East	54°58′27″N 1°43′33″W	Coal	240	1954	1991	1992–1997	A business park is now being built on the site.
Stella South	Blaydon	Tyne and Wear	North East	54°58′27″N 1°43′33″W	Coal	300	1954	1991	1995–1996	A housing estate is now being built on the site.
Stepney	Limehouse	London	Greater London	51°30′34″N 0°02′04″W	Coal	small	1907	1972	yes	
Stockport	Stockport	Greater Manchester	North West	53°24′44″N 2°09′15″W	Coal	92.5	1899	1976	yes	
Stoke-on-Trent	Stoke-on-Trent	Staffordshire	West Midlands	53°01′01″N 2°10′18″W	Coal	31	1913	1960s	yes	
Stonebridge Park	Stonebridge Park	Brent	Greater London	51°32′51″N 0°17′06″W	Coal	38.2	1914	1967	yes	Railway traction current
Stourport A	Stourport	Worcestershire	West Midlands	52°20′01″N 2°16′28″W	Coal	173	1926	1978	yes	
Stourport B	Stourport	Worcestershire	West Midlands		Coal	112	1950	1983/4	yes	
St Helens	St. Helens	Liverpool City Region	North West	53°27′02″N 2°44′54″W	Coal	24	1896	late 1960s	yes	
St. Marylebone	Marylebone	Westminster	Greater London		Coal	35.1		1965		
St. Mary's	St. Mary's	Isles of Scilly	South West		Oil engine	1.02				
St. Pancras	St. Pancras	Camden	Greater London	51°31′33″N 0°08′31″W	Coal, refuse & oil	47.6	1891	1968	yes	
Stuart Street	Stuart Street	Greater Manchester	North West	53°29′09″N 2°11′34″W	Coal	175	1900	1975	late 1970s	
Sunderland	Sunderland	Tyne and Wear	North East	54°54′42″N 1°23′47″W	Coal	34	?	1976	1979	The site is now occupied by a PC World outlet.
Sutton Bridge A	Sutton Bridge	Lincolnshire	East Midlands	52°45′26″N 0°11′35″E	CCGT	800	1999			3×266.7 MW
Sutton Coldfield	Sutton Coldfield	Warwickshire	West Midlands	52°33′46″N 1°48′58″W	Coal	1	1901	1959	no	Commercial reuse of building
Swindon	Swindon	Wiltshire	South		Coal	35				
Taylors Lane	Willesden	London	Greater London	51°32′46″N 0°15′27″W	Coal	28.6	1903	1972	?	
Taylors Lane	Willesden	London	Greater London	51°32′46″N 0°15′27″W	OCGT	144	1979			2×72 MW
Teesport Renewable Energy Plant	Teesport	Redcar and Cleveland	North East	54°35′51″N 1°10′13″W	Biomass (woodpellets)	300				
Teesside EfW plant	Billingham	County Durham	North East	54°34′37″N 1°07′14″W	Waste	20	1998			
Teesside	Wilton	Redcar and Cleveland	North East	54°34′37″N 1°07′14″W	CCGT	1,875	1993	2013	yes	Largest CCGT plant in Europe
Templeborough	Rotherham	South Yorkshire	Yorkshire and the Humber	53°25′20″N 1°22′24″W	Biomass	44	2018			
Tewkesbury	Tewkesbury	Gloucestershire	West Midlands	51°59′30″N 2°09′37″W	Gas engines	0.085	1909	1930		
Thanet	Broadstairs	Kent	South	51°22′12″N 1°25′09″E	Coal	6	1901	1964	yes	
The Close	Newcastle upon Tyne	Tyne and Wear	North East	54°57′59″N 1°36′51″W	Coal	5	1902	1948	yes	
The Close Stage 1	Newcastle upon Tyne	Tyne and Wear	North East		Coal	1	1902	Stage 2	yes	
The Close Stage 2	Newcastle upon Tyne	Tyne and Wear	North East		Coal	5	1907	1948	yes	
Thetford	Thetford	Norfolk	East		Biomass (poultry litter)	39	1999			
Thor	Seal Sands	County Durham	North East	54°36′11″N 1°12′10″W	CCGT	1,020				
Thornhill	Dewsbury	West Yorkshire	North East	53°40′38″N 1°39′17″W	Coal	186	1902	1982	yes	
Thornhill	Dewsbury	West Yorkshire	Yorkshire and the Humber	53°40′38″N 1°39′17″W	Gas	50	1998			Operational
Thorpe Marsh	Doncaster	South Yorkshire	Yorkshire and the Humber	53°34′50″N 1°05′07″W	Coal	1,100	1963	1994	1990s (most of station), 2012 (cooling towers)	Prototype for all the large modern power stations in England (at the time). 2×550 MW + 2 Rolls-Royce OCGT 2×28 MW
Tilbury A	Tilbury	Thurrock, Essex	East	51°27′18″N 0°23′30″E	Oil	360	1956	1981	1999	
Tilbury B	Tilbury	Thurrock, Essex	East	51°27′18″N 0°23′30″E	Coal + oil + biofuel	1,131	1967	2013	2016–2019	
Torquay	Torquay	Devon	South West		Coal					
Tunbridge Wells	Tunbridge Wells	Kent	South East	51°08′24″N 0°16′09″E	Coal	11.25	1895	1968		
Trafford	Trafford	Greater Manchester	North West		Coal, fuel oil	58 15	1929 1952	1976 1967	yes	Steam and gas turbine
Trafford	Carrington	Greater Manchester	North West		CCGT	1,520	TBD			On the same site as Carrington
Uxbridge	Uxbridge	Middlesex	South	51°32′32″N 0°29′15″W	Coal	4.16	1902	1963		
Wakefield A	Wakefield	West Yorkshire	Yorkshire and the Humber	53°40′25″N 1°28′24″W	Coal		pre-WWII	yes	yes	
Wakefield B	Wakefield	West Yorkshire	Yorkshire and the Humber	53°40′25″N 1°28′24″W	Coal	224	1957	1991	1994	
Wallasey	Poulton	Cheshire	North West	53°24′29″N 3°02′45″W	Coal + fuel oil	22.5	1897	late 1960s	yes	
Walsall	Walsall	Birmingham	West Midlands	52°35′10″N 1°59′33″W	Coal	2.6	1895	1917	yes	See Birchills Power Station
Walsall (Birchills)	Walsall	Birmingham	West Midlands		Coal	191	1949	1982	1987	See Birchills Power Station
Walthamstow	Walthamstow	Waltham Forest	Greater London		Coal	19.5	1904	1967	yes	
Wandsworth	Wandsworth	London	Greater London	51°27′40″N 0°11′40″W	Coal	22	1897	1965	yes	
Warrington	Warrington	Warrington	North West	53°23′08″N 2°35′10″W	Coal	85	1900	1979	yes	
Warwick	Warwick	Warwickshire	Midlands		Coal	30				also known as Avon power station
Watford	Watford	Hertfordshire	East	51°38′34″N 0°24′16″W	Coal	27	1899	1990	yes	
Wednesbury	Wednesbury	West Midlands	West Midlands	52°33′04″N 2°01′14″W	Gas engines	0.25	1910	1919		
West Bromwich	West Bromwich	West Midlands	West Midlands	52°31′53″N 2°00′26″W	Refuse	6.65	1901	1928		
West Burton A	Bole	Nottinghamshire	East Midlands	53°21′54″N 0°49′10″W	Coal	1,972	1967	2023		
West Burton B	Bole	Nottinghamshire	East Midlands	53°21′54″N 0°49′10″W	CCGT	1,270	2012			
West Ham	Canning Town	London	Greater London	51°31′05″N 0°00′05″E	Coal	114	1904	1983	Yes	
West Thurrock	West Thurrock	Essex	East	51°28′10″N 0°17′20″E	Coal	1,300	1962	1993	yes	
Weston-super-Mare	Weston-super-Mare	Somerset	South West		Coal	2.6		1958		
Westwood	Ince-in-Makerfield	Greater Manchester	North West	53°32′17″N 2°37′40″W	Coal	120	1950	1980s	1989	
Weymouth	Weymouth	Dorset	South		Coal	4.65				
Wheldale	Castleford	West Yorkshire	Yorkshire and the Humber		Gas	10	~2000			
Whinfield Stage 1	Rowlands Gill	Tyne and Wear	North East	54°55′03″N 1°45′53″W	Coal		1896	Stage 2	1970s	
Whinfield Stage 2	Rowlands Gill	Tyne and Wear	North East	54°55′03″N 1°45′53″W	Coal		1914	1932	1970s	
Whitebirk Power Station	Whitebirk, near Blackburn	Lancashire	North West	53°45′36″N 2°26′54″W	Coal	143	1921	1976	yes	Also known as Blackburn East, it opened on 22 October 1921. A £2m extension was completed in 1945. It was closed in 1976 and the cooling towers were demolished in May 1982. In 1984 go-ahead was given to develop the site as a retail park.
Wickwar	Wickwar	Gloucestershire	West Midlands	51°35′57″N 2°23′49″W	Coal & small hydro	0.03	1888	Late 1920s		
Wilford	Wilford	Nottinghamshire	East Midlands	52°55′55″N 1°10′01″W	Coal	316	1925	1981	yes	Expanded from the original 30MW to 316MW. Riverside Retail Park opened at site. Also called Nottingham and North Wilford.
Willesden (Acton Lane, Taylors Lane)	Willesden	Greater London	South East	—	—	—	—	—	—	See Acton Lane and Taylors Lane
Willington A	Willington	Derbyshire	East Midlands	52°51′14″N 1°33′54″W	Coal	400	1957	1990s	partly ~2000	4×100 MW
Willington B	Willington	Derbyshire	East Midlands	52°51′14″N 1°33′54″W	Coal	400	1960s	1990s	partly ~2000	2×200 MW
Wilton	Wilton	Redcar and Cleveland	North East	54°35′22″N 1°07′07″W	Coal, oil + gas	197	1952			
Wilton 10	Wilton	Redcar and Cleveland	North East	54°35′22″N 1°07′07″W	Biomass (sustainable wood, sawmill and offcut waste)	30	2007			
Wilton 11	Wilton	Redcar and Cleveland	North East	54°35′22″N 1°07′07″W	Waste	35	2016			
Wimbledon	Wimbledon	Greater London	London	51°25′52″N 0°11′33″W	Coal	24.2	1899	1968	yes	
Winfrith	Winfrith Newburgh	Dorset	South West	50°40′55″N 2°15′40″W	Nuclear	100	1968	1990	2018	Research reactor site active 1958-1995
Winnington CHP	Northwich	Cheshire	North West		Gas CHP	130	2000			One of the largest CHPs in the United Kingdom
Woking	Woking	Surrey	South East	51°19′26″N 0°33′01″W	Coal	7	1890	1960		
Wolverhampton	Wolverhampton	West Midlands	Midlands	52°34′54″N 2°06′54″W	Coal	30	1895	1976	Main power hall remains standing but in derelict condition.	
Woolwich	London	London	Greater London	51°29′40″N 0°3′57″E	Coal	57	1893	1978	1979	The site of the main power station building is now occupied by the Waterfront Leisure Centre car park.
Worcester	Worcester	Worcestershire	Midlands	52°11′30″N 2°13′43″W	Coal + hydro	37.5	1894	1976	1979	
Worthing	Worthing	Sussex	South		Oil engine	1.29		1958		

== Non-thermal ==
=== Hydropower and wave ===
Name	Location	County	Region	Coordinates	Type	Total capacity (MW)	Opened	Closed	Demolished	Notes
Backbarrow Power Station	Backbarrow	Cumbria	North West	54°15′16″N 2°59′25″W	Small hydro	0.325	2000			3 Kaplan turbines
Bedlington	Northumberland		North East		Small hydro	0.3	1989			
Beeston Hydro	Beeston	Nottinghamshire	East Midlands	52°55′08″N 1°13′41″W	Small hydro	1.66	2000			UK's largest "run-of river" hydro-electric plant
Belper North Mill	Belper	Derbyshire	East Midlands	53°01′42″N 1°29′13″W	Small hydro	0.35	1998			
Biddulph	Biddulph	Staffordshire	West Midlands		Small hydro	0.00				
Blockley	Blockley	Gloucestershire	West Midlands	52°00′48″N 1°45′40″W	Small hydro	0.02	1888	c. 1931		
Borrowash Mill	Borrowash	Derbyshire	East Midlands	52°54′01″N 1°22′00″W	Small hydro	0.179	1995			
Brignall Mill	Brignall	County Durham	North East	54°30′21″N 1°53′54″W	Small hydro	0.003				
Burton Mill	Burton upon Trent	Staffordshire	West Midlands		Small hydro	0.07	1998			
Chagford		Devon	South West		Small hydro	0.026				
Coniston	Coniston	Cumbria	North West		Small hydro	0.30	1932	after 1963		
Cotton Valley Sewage Works 2	Milton Keynes	Buckinghamshire	South East	52°03′27″N 0°42′32″W	Small hydro	0.015	2006			
Cuckney School	Cuckney	Nottinghamshire	East Midlands	53°14′06″N 1°09′14″W	Small hydro	0.008	2006			
De Lank Quarry	St Breward	Cornwall	South West		Small hydro	0.3	2002			
Derwent Reservoir	Blanchland	County Durham/Northumberland	North East		Small hydro	0.097	1957			
Downton	Salisbury	Wiltshire	South West	50°59′32″N 1°44′43″W	Small hydro	0.035		1972-78	Station was diesel engine and hydro-electric.	
Fladbury	Pershore	Worcestershire	West Midlands	52°06′44″N 2°00′21″W	Small hydro	0.009	1900	c. 1925		
Gants Mill	Bruton	Somerset	South West	51°06′23″N 2°28′01″W	Small hydro	0.012	2004			
Glen Lyn Gorge	Lynmouth	Devon	South West		Small hydro	0.3				
Guildford Hydro	Guildford	Surrey	South East	51°10′48″N 0°45′00″W	Small hydro	0.035	2006			
Hamlyn Mill	Swaffham	Norfolk	East		Small hydro	0.007	2006			
Houghton Mill	Houghton	Cambridgeshire	East		Small hydro	0.012	1999			
Kielder Water	Kielder	Northumberland	North East	55°11′00″N 2°30′00″W	Small hydro	6	1982			
Linton	Linton-on-Ouse	North Yorkshire	North East		Small hydro	0.75	before 1923			
Longbridge Weir Hydro	Derby	Derbyshire	East Midlands	52°55′22″N 1°28′15″W	Small hydro	0.023	2013			
Ludlow	Ludlow	Shropshire	West Midlands	52°22′12″N 2°43′00″W	Gas engines & small hydro					
Marytavy	Marytavy	Devon	South West		Small hydro	3.988				
Masson Mill	Matlock Bath	Derbyshire	East Midlands	53°06′46″N 1°33′42″W	Small hydro	0.26	1994			
Newbury	Newbury	Berkshire	South	51°24′07″N 1°18′53″W	Small hydro	0.112	1905	before 1954		
Osney Lock Hydro	Oxford	Oxfordshire	South East	51°44′59″N 1°16′24″W	Small hydro	0.049	2015			
Ringwood	Ringwood	Hampshire	South		Hydro + oil engine	0.147				
Salgasson's (Westbrook) Mill	Godalming	Surrey	South East	51°11′10″N 0°37′14″W	Hydro + coal	0.0075	1881	1884		First power unit for public lighting
Salisbury	Salisbury	Wiltshire	South	51°04′09″N 1°47′52″W	Small hydro	0.045	1898	before 1923	building extant	Gilkes 60 hp turbine
Settle Hydro	Settle	North Yorkshire	Yorkshire and the Humber	54°07′26″N 2°28′08″W	Small hydro	0.05	2009			
Stockport hydro	Marple Stockport	Cheshire	North West		Small hydro	0.068	2012			
Tellisford Mill	Tellisford	Somerset	South West	51°17′54″N 2°16′52″W	Small hydro	0.075	2007			
Torrs Hydro	New Mills	Derbyshire	East Midlands	53°21′50″N 2°00′01″W	Small hydro	0.063	2008			
Whalley Hydro	Whalley	Lancashire	North West	53°49′07″N 2°24′15″W	Small hydro	0.1	2014			
Wave Hub	Hayle	Cornwall	South West	50°18′40″N 5°31′30″W	Wave	20	2014	2019		
Wickwar	Wickwar	Gloucestershire	West Midlands	51°35′57″N 2°23′49″W	Coal & small hydro	0.03	1888	Late 1920s		
Worcester	Worcester	Worcestershire	Midlands	52°11′30″N 2°13′43″W	Small hydro	0.4	1894	1930s	Converted to residential use	

==== Other hydropower schemes ====
Small hydropower sites in Great Britain with no further information.

- Gayle Mill, Hawes, North Yorkshire
- Itteringham Mill
- Marlingford Mill
- Marsh Mill
- Milford Mill
- Old Walls, Dartmoor
- Oldcotes Mill
- Oswestry, Llanfordda
- Ponts Mill Scheme
- River Dart Country Park, Dartmoor
- Sonning Mill
- St. Blazey
- Sturston Mill
- Talamh Life Centre
- Tellisford Mill, Somerset
- Trecarrell Mill
- Trelubbas

=== Wind power ===
- List of onshore wind farms in the United Kingdom
- List of offshore wind farms in the United Kingdom

== See also ==
Lists sorted by type

- List of power stations in Scotland
- List of power stations in Wales
- List of power stations in Northern Ireland
- Solar power in the United Kingdom#Large-scale solar farms
- List of largest power stations in the world
