= Kingston Power Station =

Kingston Power Station can refer to one of several power stations:

- Kingston Power Station, London
- Kingston Fossil Plant, in Kingston, Tennessee, US
- Kingston Powerhouse, in Canberra, Australia
- Cowes Power Station, also known as Kingston Power Station, on the Isle of Wight
