= Chesterfield power station =

Former coal-fired power station in England

- Country: England
- Location: Chesterfield Derbyshire
- Coordinates: 53°14′10″N 01°26′21″W
- Status: Decommissioned and demolished
- Construction began: 1898
- Commission date: 1901
- Decommission date: 1958
- Owners: Chesterfield Corporation (1900–1948); British Electricity Authority (1948–1955); Central Electricity Authority (1955–1957); Central Electricity Generating Board (1958)
- Operator: As owner

Thermal power station
- Primary fuel: Coal

Power generation
- Nameplate capacity: 6.9 MW (1923)
- Annual net output: 15,618 MWh (1946)

Chesterfield power station supplied electricity to the town of Chesterfield, Derbyshire from 1901 to 1958. The electricity generating station was owned and operated by Chesterfield Corporation prior to the nationalisation of the British electricity industry in 1948. It was redeveloped as demand for electricity grew and old plant was replaced, and had a generating capacity of 6.9 MW in the 1920s. The station closed on 1 April 1958.

== History ==
Chesterfield was the location of a pioneering electricity system in the 1880s. In 1881 Hammond and Company lit Chesterfield’s main streets with 8 arc lamps from a generator installed in the yard of the Theatre Royal. By the end of the year 22 arc lamps were in service. Two 20 horse power (14.7 kW) compound engines coupled to Brush dynamos were installed along the River Hipper. These were capable of supplying 80 arc lamps and 640 incandescent lamps. The supply system included 15 miles (24 km) of overhead conductors. The system was uneconomic and was shut down in 1884. Street lighting reverted to gas lamps.

In 1894 Chesterfield Corporation applied for a provisional order under the Electric Lighting Acts to generate and supply electricity to the town. The Chesterfield (Corporation) Electric Lighting Order 1894 was granted by the Board of Trade and was confirmed by Parliament through the Electric Lighting Orders Confirmation (No. 1) Act 1894 (57 & 58 Vict. c. xlix). However, little progress was made with construction.

In 1898 a group of manufacturers in the Chesterfield area promoted the General Power Distribution Company. This was intended to compete with municipal electricity undertakings and provide supplies to an area with a million people. The municipal authorities lobbied to oppose the scheme and the Bill was rejected by Parliament.

The corporation eventually built a power station at Chatsworth Road, Chesterfield (53°14′10″N 1°26′21″W) which first supplied electricity to the town in 1901. The power station also supplied electricity for the Chesterfield Corporation Tramways which operated a tram service from 1904 to 1927.

Chesterfield Corporation owned the power station and electricity supply system until nationalisation of the British electricity industry in 1948. Under nationalisation the Chesterfield electricity undertaking was abolished, ownership of the power station was vested in the British Electricity Authority, and subsequently the Central Electricity Authority and the Central Electricity Generating Board (CEGB). At the same time the electricity distribution and sales responsibilities of the Chesterfield electricity undertaking were transferred to the East Midlands Electricity Board (EMEB).

The power station continued to operate for a decade after nationalisation until it was closed on 1 April 1958, and was subsequently demolished. The site has been redeveloped with commercial premises.

== Technical specifications ==
In 1923 the generating plant comprised:

- Coal-fired boilers supplying 121,000 lb/h (15.2 kg/s) of steam to:
- Generators:
  - 2 × 100 kW reciprocating engines and direct current generator sets
  - 2 × 200 kW reciprocating engines and DC generator sets
  - 1 × 880 kW reciprocating engine and DC generator set
  - 1 × 400 kW reciprocating engine and alternating current (AC) generator set
  - 1 × 2,000 turbo-alternators AC
  - 1 × 3,000 turbo-alternators AC

These machines had a total generating capacity of 6,880 kW, of which 1,480 kW was DC and 5,400 kW AC.

Electricity supplies were available to consumers at:

- 3-phase 50 HZ AC at 6,000 V, 415 and 240 Volts
- DC at 480 and 240 Volts
- DC traction current 500/550 Volts

The end use of electricity over the period 1921–23 was:

Chesterfield electricity use 1921–23
Electricity Use	Units	Year		
Electricity Use	Units	1921	1922	1923
Lighting and domestic	MWh	472	539	803
Public lighting	MWh	23	17	25
Traction	MWh	573	499	468
Power	MWh	3,438	2,263	2,486
Bulk supply	MWh	0	0	0
Total use	MWh	4,505	3,318	3,782

The operating parameters of the electricity system were:

Chesterfield electricity system 1921–23
Operating	Units	Year		
Operating	Units	1921	1922	1923
Maximum load	kW	2,816	2474	2892
Total connections	kW	6854	6990	7374
Load factor	Per cent	22.4	19.9	19.4

Revenue from sales of current was £42,960 (1922) and £35,903 (1923). The surplus of revenue over expenses £14,655 (1922) and £17,914 (1923).

The electricity output and operating data in the final years was:

Chesterfield power station output and operating data
Year	Running hours (load factor %)	Max. Output capacity MW	Electricity supplied MWh	Thermal efficiency per cent
1946	(30.1 %)	5.91 (max load supplied)	15,618	11.65
1954	2767	3	9,330	8.13
1955	1728	3	3,848	7.76
1956	1308	3	3,291	7.75
1957	865	3	1,870	7.24
1958	320	2	0,492	5.30

== See also ==
- Timeline of the UK electricity supply industry
- List of power stations in England
