= Grimsby power station =

Former power station in England

- Country: England
- Location: Grimsby
- Coordinates: 53°33′47″N 00°04′57″W
- Status: Decommissioned and demolished
- Commission date: 1901
- Decommission date: Late 1960s
- Owners: Grimsby Corporation (1894–1948); British Electricity Authority (1948–1955); Central Electricity Authority (1955–1957); Central Electricity Generating Board (1958–1970)
- Operator: As owner

Thermal power station
- Primary fuel: Coal
- Secondary fuel: Fuel oil
- Turbine technology: Steam turbines
- Chimneys: 5
- Cooling towers: 3 x wood, 3 x concrete
- Cooling source: Cooling towers

Power generation
- Units operational: 1 x 3 MW, 2 x 10 MW, 1 x 15 MW
- Make and model: Metropolitan-Vickers, Brush-Ljungstrom
- Units decommissioned: All
- Nameplate capacity: 38 MW
- Annual net output: 128 GWh (1954)

Grimsby power station supplied electricity to the town of Grimsby, England and the surrounded area from 1901 to the late 1960s. It was owned and operated by Grimsby Corporation prior to the nationalisation of the British electricity supply industry in 1948. The power station was redeveloped in the 1920s and 1930s to meet the increased demand for electricity.

== History ==
In 1894 Grimsby Corporation applied for a Provisional Order under the Electric Lighting Acts to generate and supply electricity to the town. The Grimsby (Corporation) Electric Lighting Order 1894 was granted by the Board of Trade and was confirmed by Parliament through the Electric Lighting Orders Confirmation (No. 2) Act 1894 (57 & 58 Vict. c. l). The power station was built in Moss Road Grimsby (53°33′47″N 0°04′57″W) and it first supplied electricity in 1901.

== Equipment specification ==
The initial installation of plant in 1901 was three Lancashire boilers supplying steam to three 150 HP Belliss and Morcom engines driving Mather and Platt generating sets. Shortly after opening a fourth 150 HP engine was being installed and a 330 HP Belliss engine coupled to a Westinghouse 200 kW unit was on order.

=== Plant in 1923 ===
By 1923 the generating plant comprised:

- Coal-fired boilers generating up to 107,000 lb/h (13.5 kg/s) of steam which was supplied to:
- Generators:
  - 2 × 210 kW reciprocating engines DC
  - 2 × 500 kW reciprocating engines DC
  - 1 × 100 kW steam turbo-generators DC
  - 1 × 2,500 kW steam turbo-alternators AC

These machines gave a total generating capacity of 2,500 kW of alternating current plus 2,420 kW direct current.

Electricity supplies to consumers were 460 & 230 Volts DC.

=== Plant in 1924–39 ===
New plant was commissioned in 1924, 1929, 1932 and 1939. This comprised:

- Boilers:
  - 2 × Clarke Chapman 70,000 lb/h (8.8 kg/s), steam conditions 250 psi and 700°F (17.2 bar, 371°C),
  - 3 × Clarke Chapman 95,000 lb/h (12.0 kg/s), steam conditions 250 psi and 755°F (17.2 bar, 402°C),

The boilers supplied steam to:

- Turbo-alternators:
  - 1 × 3 MW Metropolitan-Vickers turbo-alternator, generating at 6.6 kV
  - 2 × 10 MW Metropolitan-Vickers turbo-alternators, generating at 6.6 kV
  - 1 × 15 MW Brush-Ljungstrom turbo-alternator, generating at 6.6 kV.

The completed total installed generating capacity was 38 MW.

Condenser cooling water was cooled in three wood and three concrete cooling towers with a combined capacity of 2.47 million gallons per hour (3.12 m^{3}/s).

In 1960 internal combustion engines was installed at Grimsby power station with a capacity of 2.0 MW.

== Operations ==
=== Operating data 1921–23 ===
The operating data for the period 1921–23 was:

Grimsby power station operating data 1921–23
Electricity Use	Units	Year		
Electricity Use	Units	1921	1922	1923
Lighting and domestic use	MWh	1,484	1,539	1,657
Public lighting use	MWh	283	292	321
Traction	MWh	638	553	597
Power use	MWh	1,634	2,888	4,772
Total use	MWh	4,039	5,273	7,347
Load and connected load
Maximum load	kW	2,327	2,914	3,330
Total connections	kW	8,702	10,818	10,268
Load factor	Per cent	25.4	28.4	34.9
Financial
Revenue from sales of current	£	–	78,899	77,418
Surplus of revenue over expenses	£	–	28,316	3,300

Under the terms of the Electricity (Supply) Act 1926 (16 & 17 Geo. 5 c. 51) the Central Electricity Board (CEB) was established in 1926. The CEB identified high efficiency ‘selected’ power stations that would supply electricity most effectively; Grimsby was able to improve its performance efficiency sufficiently to be designated a CEB selected station. The CEB also constructed the national grid (1927–33) to connect power stations within a region.

=== Operating data 1946 ===
Grimsby power station operating data for 1946 is:

Year	Load factor per cent	Max output load MW	Electricity supplied MWh	Thermal efficiency per cent
1946	32.2	20,013	56,392	15.6

The British electricity supply industry was nationalised in 1948 under the provisions of the Electricity Act 1947 (10 & 11 Geo. 6 c. 54). The Grimsby electricity undertaking was abolished, ownership of Grimsby power station was vested in the British Electricity Authority, and subsequently the Central Electricity Authority and the Central Electricity Generating Board (CEGB). At the same time the electricity distribution and sales responsibilities of the Grimsby electricity undertaking were transferred to the Yorkshire Electricity Board (YEB).

=== Operating data 1954–67 ===
Operating data for the period 1954–67 was:

Grimsby power station (steam plant) operating data, 1954–67
Year	Running hours or load factor (per cent)	Max output capacity MW	Electricity supplied GWh	Thermal efficiency per cent
1954	8385	34	128.189	17.39
1955	6577	34	82.521	15.96
1956	6033	34	76.041	16.33
1957	5936	34	73.944	16.26
1958	6448	34	107.529	16.45
1961	33.8 %	34	100.528	16.57
1962	41.5 %	34	123.492	17.03
1963	43.11%	34	128.386	16.40
1967	18.1 %	35	53.878	15.39

The operating data for the internal combustion engines was:

Year	Load factor per cent	Max output capacity MW	Electricity supplied GWh	Thermal efficiency per cent
1961	16.0	2	0.608	29.72
1962	16.9	2	2.964	34.89
1963	18.47	2	3.236	33.54
1967	10.9	2	1.910	31.65

Grimsby was an electricity supply district, covering 350 square miles (906 km^{2}) of north Lincolnshire with a population of 171,000 in 1958. The number of consumers and electricity sold in the Grimsby district was:

Year	1956	1957	1958
Number of consumers	56,017	57,672	58,936
Electricity sold MWh	218,435	246,842	278,508

== Closure ==
Grimsby power station was decommissioned in the late 1960s. The buildings were subsequently demolished and the area has been redeveloped with industrial and commercial units.

== See also ==
- Timeline of the UK electricity supply industry
- List of power stations in England
