= South Shields power station =

Former coal-fired power station

- Country: England
- Location: South Shields
- Coordinates: 54°59′27″N 01°26′42″W
- Status: Decommissioned and demolished
- Commission date: 1896
- Decommission date: 1958
- Owners: South Shields Corporation (1894–1948); British Electricity Authority (1948–1955); Central Electricity Authority (1955–1957); Central Electricity Generating Board (1958)
- Operator: As owner

Thermal power station
- Primary fuel: Coal
- Turbine technology: Steam turbines

Power generation
- Units operational: (See text)
- Nameplate capacity: 10 MW
- Annual net output: 10,092 MWh (1946)

South Shields power station supplied electricity to the borough of South Shields and the surrounding area from 1896 to 1958. It was owned and operated by South Shields Corporation until the nationalisation of the British electricity supply industry in 1948. The power station was redeveloped several times to meet increasing demand It was decommissioned in 1958.

== History ==
In 1891 South Shields Corporation applied for a provisional order under the Electric Lighting Acts to generate and supply electricity to the town. The South Shields Electric Lighting Order 1891 was granted by the Board of Trade and was confirmed by Parliament through the Electric Lighting Orders Confirmation (No. 4) Act 1891 (54 & 55 Vict. c. lii). The power station was built in West Holborn South Shields (54°59′27″N 1°26′42″W) and first supplied electricity in September 1896.

== Equipment specification ==
The original plant at South Shields power station comprised triple open-type marine engines, vertical surface condensing, coupled directly to Ferranti dynamos. In 1898 the generating capacity was 415 kW and the maximum load was 127 kW.

=== Plant in 1923 ===
By 1923 the generating plant comprised:

- Coal-fired boilers generating up to 135,000 lb/h (17 kg/s) of steam, which was supplied to:
- Generators
  - 1 × 200 kW reciprocating engine AC
  - 2 × 500 kW reciprocating engines AC
  - 2 × 550 kW reciprocating engines DC
  - 1 × 750 kW steam turbine dual AC and DC
  - 1 × 2,000 kW steam turbo-alternator AC
  - 1 × 3,000 kW steam turbo-alternator AC

These machines gave a total generating capacity of 6,950 kW of alternating current and 1,850 kW direct current.

A variety of electricity supplies were available to consumers as:

- Single phase, 50 Hz AC, at 110 and 220 Volts
- 3-phase, 50 Hz AC at 2,100 Volts
- DC 500 Volts

== Operations ==
=== Operating data 1898 ===
In 1898 the undertaking’s 90 customers were sold 82,172 kWh of electricity, plus 41,729 kWh for public lighting. These sales generated a revenue for the Corporation of £4,842.

=== Operating data 1921–23 ===
The operating data for the period 1921–23 was:

South Shields power station operating data 1921–23
Electricity Use	Units	Year		
Electricity Use	Units	1921	1922	1923
Lighting and domestic use	MWh	1,545	1,573	1,759
Public lighting use	MWh	134	200	254
Traction	MWh	1,894	1,902	1,971
Power use	MWh	4,382	3,119	3,279
Total use	MWh	7,956	6,794	7,283
Load and connected load
Maximum load	kW	4,312	3,938	4,340
Total connections	kW	12,309	15,970	16,656
Load factor	Per cent	26.6	24.8	24.3
Financial
Revenue from sales of current	£	–	81,209	82,305
Surplus of revenue over expenses	£	–	43,232	44,195

Under the terms of the Electricity (Supply) Act 1926 (16 & 17 Geo. 5 c. 51) the Central Electricity Board (CEB) was established in 1926. The CEB identified high efficiency ‘selected’ power stations that would supply electricity most effectively. The CEB also constructed the national grid (1927–33) to connect power stations within a region.

=== Operating data 1946 ===
South Shields power station had a maximum output load of 10,972 MW and delivered 10,092 MWh of electricity in 1946.

The British electricity supply industry was nationalised in 1948 under the provisions of the Electricity Act 1947 (10 & 11 Geo. 6 c. 54). The South Shields electricity undertaking was abolished, ownership of South Shields power station was vested in the British Electricity Authority, and subsequently the Central Electricity Authority and the Central Electricity Generating Board (CEGB). At the same time the electricity distribution and sales responsibilities of the South Shields electricity undertaking were transferred to the North Eastern Electricity Board (NEEB).

=== Operating data 1954–58 ===
Operating data for the period 1954–58 was:

South Shields power station operating data, 1954–58
Year	Running hours	Max output capacity MW	Electricity supplied GWh	Thermal efficiency per cent
1954	1134	10	5.042	9.59
1955	1544	10	8.513	11.56
1956	1501	10	7.244	11.83
1957	1385	10	6.128	11.56
1958	1445	10	5.562	12.89

South Shields was an electricity supply district, covering the 4,874 acres (1,972 ha) of the County Borough of South Shields with a population of 108,300 in 1958. The number of consumers and electricity sold was:

Year	1956	1957	1958
Number of consumers	38,209	38,933	39,154
Electricity sold MWh	97,939	103,258	110,648

In 1958 the number of units sold to categories of consumers was:

Type of consumer	No. of consumers	Electricity sold MWh
Residential	36,294	34,977
Shops, offices, etc	2,492	13,339
Factories	359	52,138
Farms	4	47
Public traction	2	9,927
Public lighting	3	2,220
Total	39,154	110,648

There were 328 miles (528 km) of high voltage mains in the district comprising 324 miles (521 km) of underground mains and 4 miles (6.4 km) of overhead cables.

== Closure ==
South Shields power station was decommissioned on 30 September 1958. The buildings were subsequently demolished and the area is derelict.

== See also ==
- Timeline of the UK electricity supply industry
- List of power stations in England
