= Sutton Coldfield power station =

Former coal-fired power station

- Country: England
- Location: Sutton Coldfield
- Coordinates: 52°33′46″N 01°48′58″W
- Status: Decommissioned
- Construction began: 1899
- Commission date: 1901
- Decommission date: 1959
- Owners: Sutton Coldfield Corporation (1899–1948); British Electricity Authority (1948–1955); Central Electricity Authority (1955–1957); Central Electricity Generating Board (1958–1959)
- Operator: As owner

Thermal power station
- Primary fuel: Coal
- Turbine technology: Steam and reciprocating engines
- Chimneys: 1 (150 feet)

Power generation
- Units operational: 1 x 150 kW, 1 x 275 kW, 1 x 450 kW
- Nameplate capacity: 1 MW
- Annual net output: 3,277 MWh (1946)

Sutton Coldfield power station supplied electricity to the town of Sutton Coldfield, Birmingham (then part of Warwickshire) from 1901 to 1959. The electricity generating station was owned and operated by Sutton Coldfield Corporation prior to the nationalisation of the British electricity industry in 1948. It was closed in 1959 when it had a generating capacity of 1.0 MW.

== History ==
In 1899 Sutton Coldfield Corporation applied for a provisional order under the Electric Lighting Acts to generate and supply electricity to the town. The Sutton Coldfield Electric Lighting Order 1899 was granted by the Board of Trade and was confirmed by Parliament through the Electric Lighting Orders Confirmation (No. 1) Act 1899 (62 & 63 Vict. c. xxxiv). The corporation bought for £650 the old gas works site, at the intersection of Coleshill Road and Riland Road, Sutton Coldfield (52°33′46″N 1°48′58″W), and built a power station which first supplied electricity to the town in 1901. The initial system had a generating capacity of 350 kW and supplied 12 arc lights and 108 incandescent bulbs and was capable of supplying 10,000 private lamps.

Sutton Coldfield Corporation owned the power station and electricity supply system until nationalisation of the British electricity industry in 1948. Under nationalisation the Sutton Coldfield electricity undertaking was abolished, ownership of the power station was vested in the British Electricity Authority, and subsequently the Central Electricity Authority and the Central Electricity Generating Board (CEGB). At the same time the electricity distribution and sales responsibilities of the Sutton Coldfield electricity undertaking were transferred to the Midlands Electricity Board (MEB).

The power station continued to operate for a decade after nationalisation until it was closed in 1959.

== Technical specification ==
By 1923 the generating plant comprised:

- Coal-fired boilers supplying 24,000 lb/h (3.02 kg/s) of steam to:
- Generators:
  - 1 × 150 kW reciprocating engines and direct current generator sets
  - 1 × 275kW reciprocating engine and DC generator sets
  - 1 × 450 kW reciprocating engine and DC generator set

These machines had a total generating capacity of 875 kW.

Electricity supplies were available to consumers at 480 and 240 Volts DC

== Operations ==
The end use of electricity over the period 1921–23 was:

Sutton Coldfield electricity use 1921–23
Electricity Use	Units	Year		
Electricity Use	Units	1921	1922	1923
Lighting and domestic	MWh	507	487	545
Public lighting	MWh	153	153	159
Traction	MWh	0	0	0
Power	MWh	352	329	355
Bulk supply	MWh	0	0	0
Total use	MWh	1,012	970	1,059

The operating parameters of the electricity system were:

Sutton Coldfield electricity system 1921–23
Operating	Units	Year		
Operating	Units	1921	1922	1923
Maximum load	kW	603	629	683
Total connections	kW	2,440	2,574	2,772
Load factor	Per cent	23.3	21.5	21.5

Revenue from sales of current was £19,610 (1922) and £19,977 (1923). The surplus of revenue over expenses £6,467 (1922) and £9,401 (1923).

In 1946 the station generated 3,277 MWh, an adjacent waste destructor generated 228 MWh. The combined output from both stations was 3451MWh. The maximum load sent out that year was 1071 MW, and the load factor was 39.5 per cent.

The power station building still exists and has been redeveloped with commercial premises.

== See also ==
- Timeline of the UK electricity supply industry
- List of power stations in England
