= Longbridge Weir Hydro =

Longbridge Weir Hydro Power House
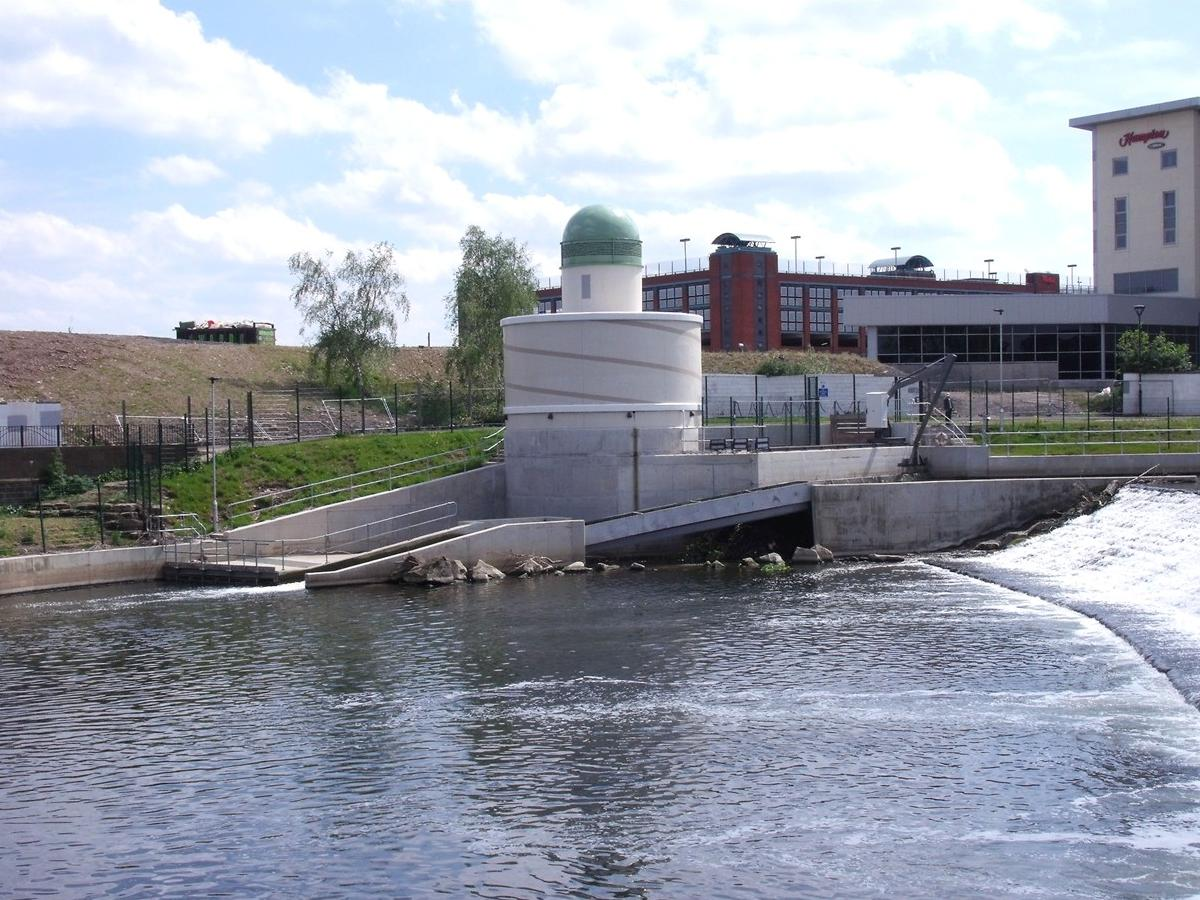
- Longbridge Weir Hydroelectric power station
- Country: United Kingdom
- Location: City of Derby, United Kingdom
- Coordinates: 52°55′22″N 1°28′15″W
- Commission date: 2012
- Owner: Derby City Council

Thermal power station
- Turbine technology: Hydroelectric

Power generation
- Units operational: 230kW

Longbridge Weir Hydro Power House is the name given to a hydro-electric dam built on the River Derwent in the City of Derby.

The project was completed by Derwent Hydro in 2013 at a cost of £1.7 million. The station primarily exists to power the city councils offices, however, surplus energy is sold back to the National Grid.
