= Elean power station =

Straw-fired power plant in Cambridgeshire, England

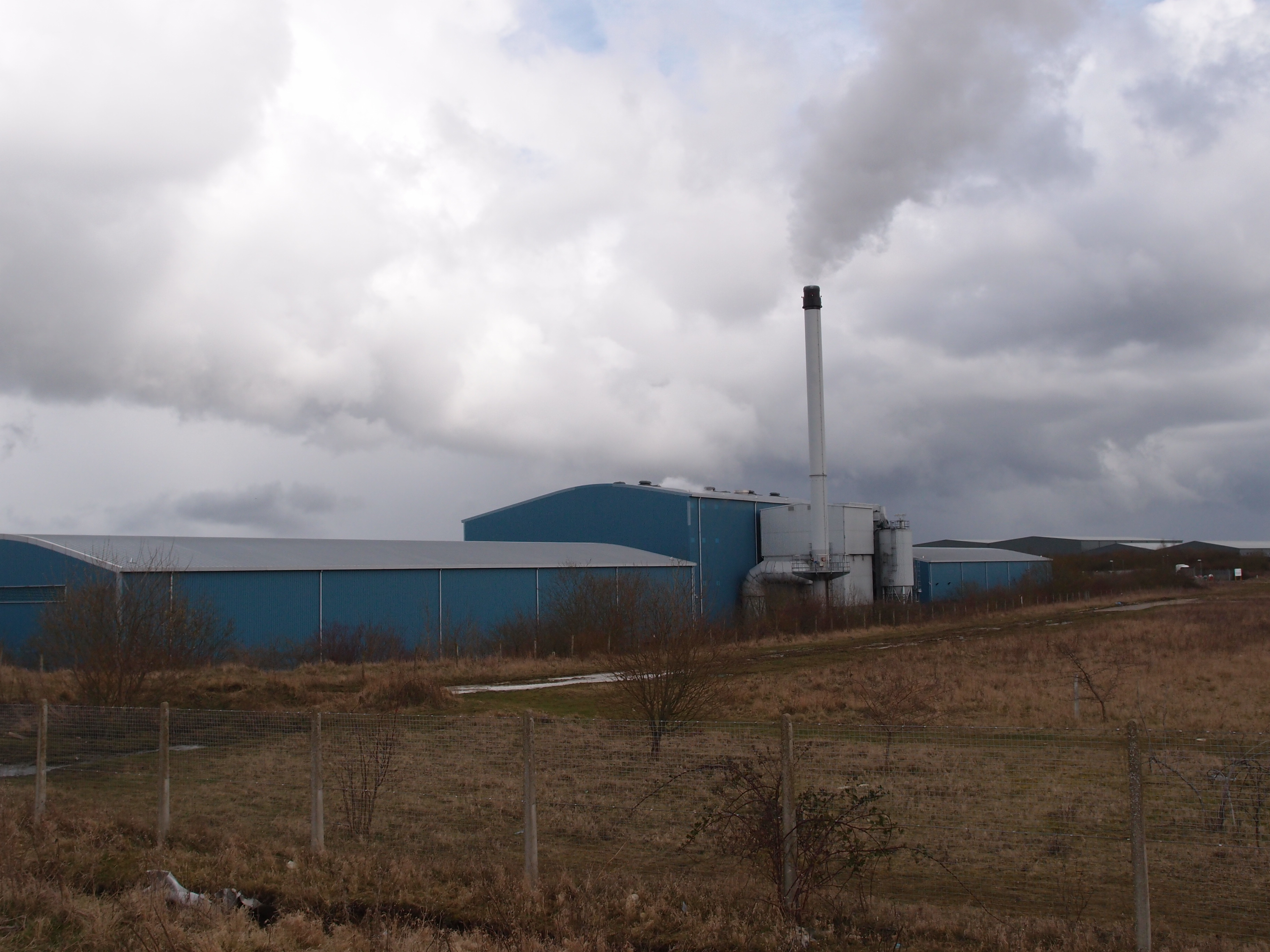
- Elean power station, Cambridgeshire
- Country: England
- Location: Sutton, Cambridgeshire
- Coordinates: 52.398370°N 0.131902°E
- Status: Operational
- Commission date: December 2000
- Owner: EPR Ely Ltd
- Operator: EPR Ely Ltd

Thermal power station
- Primary fuel: Straw
- Secondary fuel: Oil seed rape
- Tertiary fuel: Miscanthus
- Turbine technology: Steam raising boiler and steam driven turbo-alternator
- Chimneys: 1

Power generation
- Nameplate capacity: 38 MW
- Annual net output: 270 GWh

External links
- Website: ely.eprl.co.uk

Elean power station is a straw-fired biomass power station in Cambridgeshire, England. At a capacity of 38 MW, it was the largest straw-fired power plant in the world at the time of its completion. The power station was constructed between 1998 and 2000 by FLS Miljo and is operated by EPR Ely Ltd. It generates 270 GWh of electricity from 200,000 tonnes of biomass annually, supplied by Anglian Straw Ltd. Straw is the major fuel of the plant, but oilseed rape and the energy crop Miscanthus are also used, as well as some natural gas.

The vibrating grate boiler generates steam at 92 bar and 540°C which is used to drive a turbo-alternator.

In 2011, the company owning the plant were fined £120,000 after an accident during the unloading of a straw bale led to the death of a delivery driver. Later the same year Elean was affected by an arson attack on stacks of straw that were destined to be used at the plant.
