= Worcester Power Stations =

- Country: England
- Location: Worcester Worcestershire
- Coordinates: 52°11′30″N 02°13′43″W
- Status: Decommissioned
- Construction began: 1894, 1901, 1943
- Commission date: 1894, 1902, 1945
- Decommission date: 1930s, 1943, 25 October 1976
- Owners: Corporation of Worcester (1894–1948); British Electricity Authority (1948–1955); Central Electricity Authority (1955–1957); Central Electricity Generating Board (1958–1979)
- Operator: As operator

Thermal power station
- Primary fuel: Coal
- Secondary fuel: Hydroelectric
- Turbine technology: Steam turbine
- Chimneys: 1 (1902–43), 3 (1945–76)
- Cooling towers: None
- Cooling source: River water

Power generation
- Units operational: 4 × 100 kW (hydro), 37.5 MW (steam)
- Make and model: Brush, Mordley-Victoria
- Units decommissioned: All
- Nameplate capacity: 400 kW, 37.5 MW
- Annual net output: 105.309 GWh (1972)

External links
- Commons: Related media on Commons

The Worcester Power Stations were a series of hydro-electric and coal-fired generating stations providing electricity to the City of Worcester.

== History ==
There were three electricity generating stations in Worcester. The steam and hydro-electric plant at Powick Mills commissioned in 1894 has a claim to be the first such municipal plant in the world. The two later power stations were conventional steam thermal plants.

== Hydro-electricity and steam 1894–1930s ==
The Corporation of Worcester obtained legal powers under the Worcester Electric Lighting Order 1890, confirmed by the Electric Lighting Orders Confirmation Act 1890 (53 & 54 Vict. c. clxxxvi), to generate and supply electricity throughout the city. The corporation opened the Worcester Electricity Works on 11 October 1894 at Powick Mills, south west of the city beside the River Teme (52°10′15″N 2°14′33″W). The buildings had an L-shaped plan and were in orange and yellow brick with a tall brick chimney. The prime movers in the works comprised three Brush compound vertical engines; two ‘Victor’ 54 inch (1.37 m) diameter water turbines producing 211 horsepower (155 kW) from a water head of 12 ft (3.65 m); and a 30 inch (0.76 m) and a 48 inch (1.22 m) water turbine intended for use at times of low water flow. Two of the Brush engines worked in tandem with the water turbines and one was solely steam driven. The engines and water turbines drove four Mordey-Victoria alternators each capable of generating 100 kW, giving a total station output of 400 kW. The Corporation of Worcester charged customers 5d. per kWh for lighting and 3½d. per kWh for motive power.

In 1897, the plant had a generating capacity of 800 kW and the maximum load was 336 kW. A total of 325.13 MWh of electricity was sold to 291 customers and which powered 24,712 lamps, this provided an income to the corporation of £5,948-8-2.

In 1905, the corporation decided to reconstruct the Powick Mills plant. The water driven plant was effective but the steam driven plant was unused for most of the year and it was decided to scrap the steam plant as obsolete and concentrate all the steam driven plant at the Hylton Road station.

By 1923, there was a single 250 kW water turbine generating an AC supply and a 70 kW water turbine generating a DC supply.

Powick Mills continued to generate electricity into the 1940s. Although by 1925, it generated less than seven per cent of the city’s electricity demand. In 1946, it generated 529,306 kWh with a load factor of 59.4 per cent. The buildings are extant and have been converted to residential use, they are Grade II* listed.

== Steam station 1902–1943 ==
In 1902, to meet increasing electricity demand, the Corporation of Worcester built a steam driven generating station on Hylton Road. The advantages of generating electricity closer to the City included fewer transmission losses, saving of coal transportation and saving in management and working expenses. The plant included triple expansion engines with a total output capacity of 1,200 kW. The power station had a tall brick chimney. Until 1913, the output from the stations was Direct Current. Alternating current equipment was installed in 1913. This comprised a British Thomson-Houston 1,500 kW turbo-alternator and associated equipment for a two-phase supply. The capital cost of this equipment was £5431.

In 1923, the plant at Hylton Road comprised two 400 kW reciprocating generators and two 1500 kW turbo generators providing an AC supply. There was a 250 kW and 400 kW reciprocating generators providing DC current. The total evaporative capacity of the boilers at Hylton Road was 78,000 lb/hr (9.83 kg/s). A range of electricity supplies were provided: 3 phase AC 50 Hz, 200 & 440 V; 2 phase AC 50 Hz, 200 V; DC 230 & 460 V; and 500 V DC Traction Current. The amount of electricity sold, and the use, in the period 1921–3 is shown in the table, together with the revenue to the Worcester Corporation. Later, in 1923, a new 3,000 kW British Thomson Houston turbo alternator set was put into use fed from three Stirling boilers. This equipment was actually recovered from Southampton as war surplus equipment. This set was later supplemented in 1927 by a 7,500 kW British Thomson Houston turbo alternator set.

Electricity use and revenue, 1921-3
Year	1921	1922		1923	
	GWh	GWh	Revenue	GWh	Revenue
Domestic supply	0.589	0.742	£17,774	0.891	£18,370
Public lighting	0.202	0.242	£2,210	0.249	£2,257
Traction	0.281	0.259	£2,370	0.284	£2,004
Power	2.591	3.340	£22,094	4.249	£20,422
Total	3.663	4.584	£44,448	5.670	£43,053

The 1902 station remained in operation until it was demolished in 1943, when a new larger power station was built between 1943 and 1945.

== Steam station 1945–1976 ==
To meet the expected post-war increase in demand for electricity the corporation commissioned a new power station on the existing site at Hylton Road. The 1945 steel-framed station had a stepped elevation of three spaces containing the boilers, turbines and services. There were three short steel chimneys on the boiler house. The open coal store was located north of the power station buildings. Coal was delivered to the site by sidings connected to the Worcester and Hereford line west of the Worcester Viaduct over the River Severn. The boilers of the new station were chain grate stokers and were capable of delivering 450,000 lb/h (56.7 kg/s) of steam at 215 & 400 psi (14.8 & 27.6 bar) and 310 & 427 °C. Steam was fed to the steam turbo-alternators. These comprised: one 3 MW British Thomson-Houston turbo-alternator; one 7.5 MW British Thomson-Houston turbo-alternator; and two 15 MW Parsons turbo-alternators. Steam condensing and cooling was by river water.

Upon nationalisation of the British electricity supply industry in 1948 ownership of the Worcester power station was vested in the British Electricity Authority, later the Central Electricity Authority then to the Central Electricity Generating Board (CEGB). The responsibility for the distribution and sales of electricity was taken over by the Midlands Electricity Board.

The output of the station was:

Worcester power station output (GWh)
Year	1946	1954	1955	1956	1957	1958	1961	1962	1963	1967
Output GWh	118.3	59.41	62.90	66.62	65.77	36.58	61.67	37.7	56.09	111.85

By 1972, the installed capacity of the generators was 37.5 MW. In the year ending 31 March 1972, the station delivered 105.309 GWh of electricity, its load factor (the average load as a percent of maximum output capacity) was 33.3 percent. The thermal efficiency of the station (in 1972) was 20.22 per cent.

The Worcester power station closed on 25 October 1976, and was demolished in 1979.
