= Darlington Power Station =

British coal-fired power station

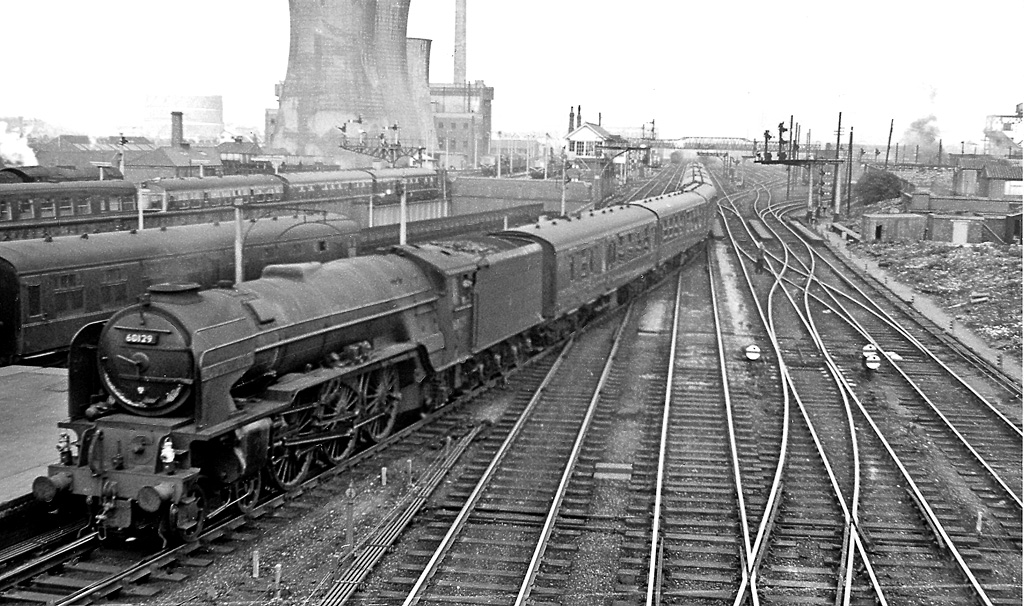
- Darlington railway station with the power station in the background
- Official name: Darlington power station
- Country: England
- Location: County Durham, North East England
- Coordinates: 54.5285°N 1.5456°W
- Status: Decommissioned and demolished
- Commission date: 1900
- Decommission date: 1976
- Owner: As operator
- Operators: Darlington Corporation (1900–1948); British Electricity Authority (1948–1955); Central Electricity Authority (1955–1957); Central Electricity Generating Board (1958–1976)

Thermal power station
- Primary fuel: Coal
- Cooling towers: 3

Power generation
- Units operational: 3 x 20 MW
- Nameplate capacity: 57 MW
- Annual net output: 9.527 GWh (1923), 111.58 GWh (1955/6), 131.4 GWh (1971)

External links
- Commons: Related media on Commons

Darlington power station refers to a series of two coal-fired power stations situated in Darlington in County Durham, North East England.

== History ==
The first station was opened on the town's Haughton Road in 1900. It was positioned alongside the East Coast Main Line for the easy delivery of coal. The station needed replacing in the 1930s, and so a new station was built on the site. The station's construction cost £324,000, but was marred by numerous accidents and deaths. The new station opened in May 1940. It had three large hyperboloid reinforced concrete cooling towers and three brick built chimneys. The station had a generating capacity of 57 megawatts (MW).

By 1923 the generating plant comprised both AC and DC machinery. The AC plant included one 1,000 kW, two 3,000 kW and one 5,000 kW turbo-alternators (a total generating capacity of 12,000 kW). These supplied 3-phase, 50 Hz, AC at 6,000 volt, 230 and 460 volt current and single phase, 50 Hz, AC at 230 and 460 V current. DC current was supplied at 230 and 460 volts from two 250 kW and two 500 kW reciprocating engines and a 500 kW turbo-alternator. In 1923 the maximum load on the system was 6,030 kW from 17,171 connections from consumers. The total number of units sold that year was 9,527,217 kWh raising £53,449. The surplus of revenue over expenses was £25,759.

Darlington ‘B’ station was built under the difficulties of war-time conditions and was completed in 1943. This station comprises three GE. 20 MW turbo-alternators operating at 400 Ib/sq in. fed from four Babcock & Wilcox and two Clarke Chapman 120k lb/hr stoker-fired boilers.

Upon nationalisation of the British electricity supply industry in 1948 the ownership of Darlington power station was vested in the British Electricity Authority, and subsequently the Central Electricity Authority and the Central Electricity Generating Board (CEGB). The electricity distribution and sales functions were vested in the North Eastern Electricity Board.

By the late 1950s the station comprised: Four Babcock and Wilcox and two Clarke Chapman and Company boilers each with an evaporative capacity of 120,000 pounds per hour of steam (15.1 kg/s). There were three 20 MW turbo-alternators. The electricity output was:

Darlington power station output
Year	Electricity output GWh
1946	259.59
1953/4	180.00
1954/5	190.76
1955/6	111.58
1956/7	65.03
1957/8	88.58
1960/1	184.4
1961/2	165.5
1962/3	143.1
1966/7	177.23

In 1962/63 Darlington power station was awarded the Christopher Hinton cup in recognition of good housekeeping. The Hinton Trophy was the equivalent award for the best Transmission District which that year went to the Durham site.

In 1971 the station had an installed capacity of 60 MW. The boilers had an output capacity of 720,000 pounds per hour (90.7 kg/s) of steam at 400 psi (27.6 bar) and 399 °C. In 1971 the station delivered 131.4 GWh of electricity.

The Central Electricity Generating Board gave 12 months notification of the station's closure in October 1975. The station closed the following year, on 25 October 1976. The chimneys were taken down by hand in 1978, and the cooling towers were demolished on 28 January 1979. The Station building was demolished in 1979.

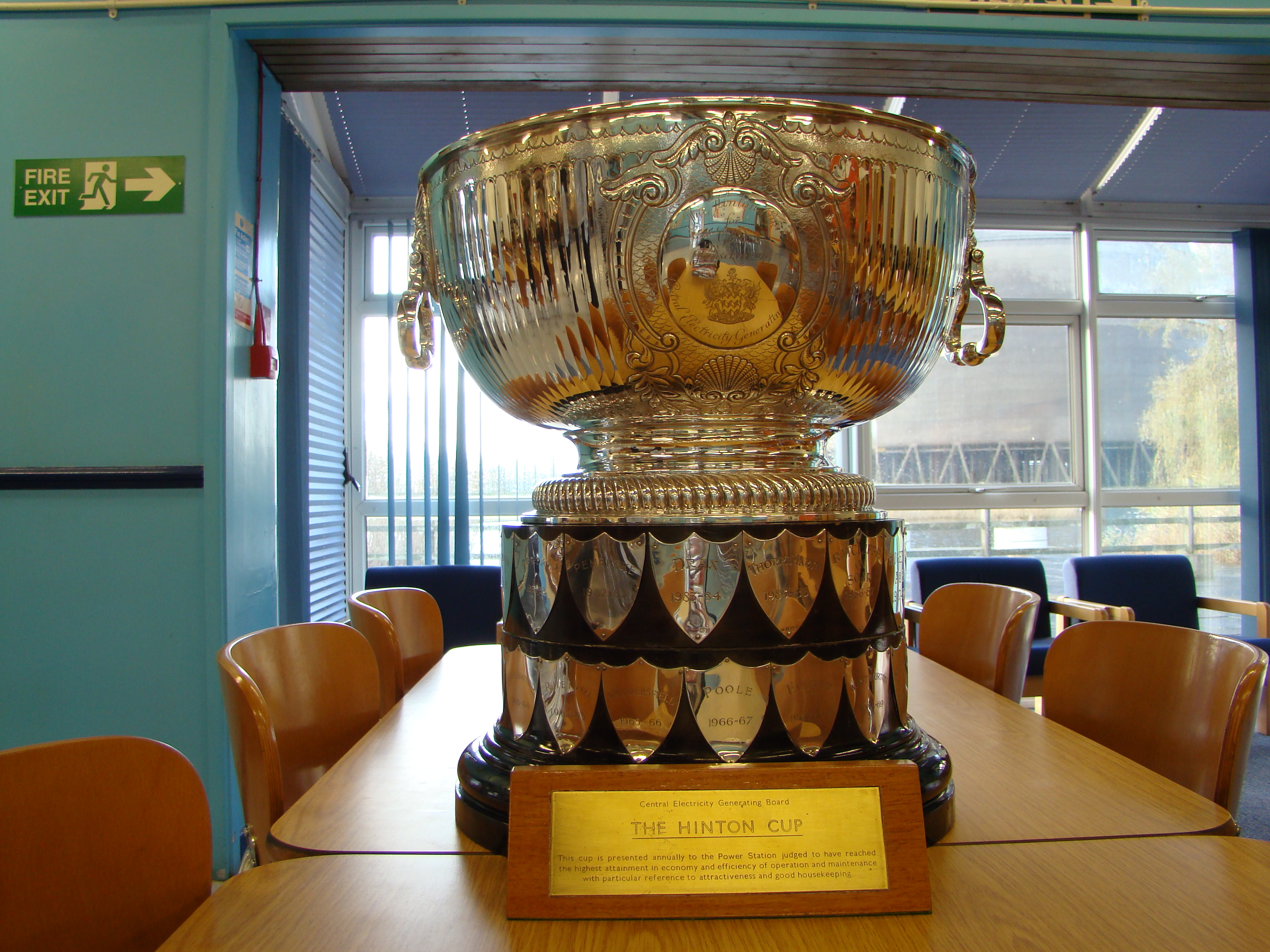
Hinton Cup
