= Philadelphia Power Station =

Defunct coal-fired power station in Tyne and Wear, England

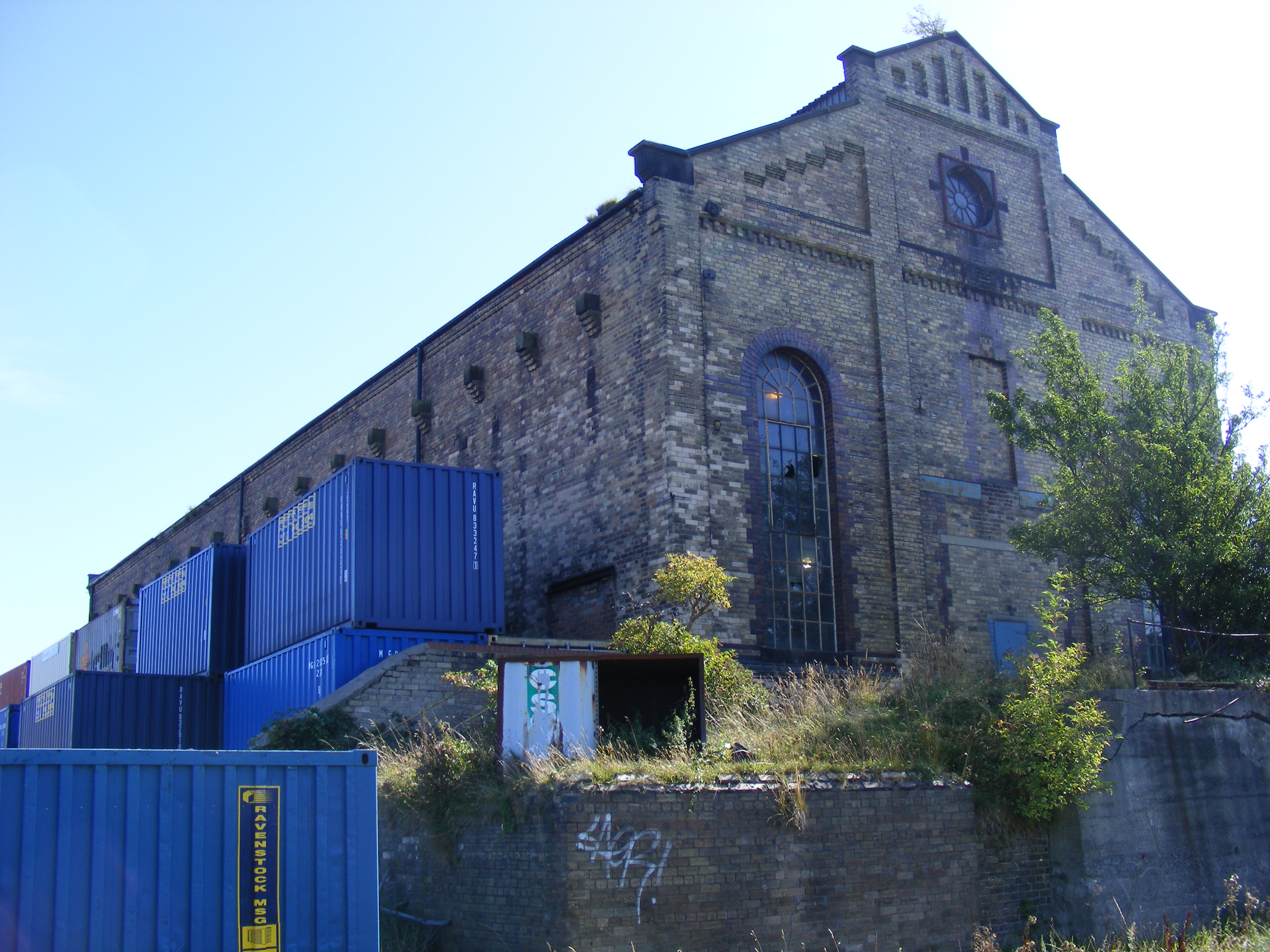
- Philadelphia power station in September 2009
- Official name: Philadelphia power station
- Country: England
- Location: Tyne and Wear, North East England
- Coordinates: 54.861676°N 1.481196°W
- Commission date: 1905
- Operator: Durham Collieries Power Company

Thermal power station
- Primary fuel: Coal

External links
- Commons: Related media on Commons

Philadelphia Power Station is a defunct coal-fired power station situated between the villages of Philadelphia and Newbottle, 1.5 mi (2.4 km) north of Houghton-le-Spring in Tyne and Wear, North East England.

== History ==
The station was built by the Sunderland District Electric Tramways Ltd and the Durham Collieries Power Company. It was built to provide electricity for the local district tramway and collieries, and it was planned for the station to open in May 1905, but its opening was delayed slightly, also delaying the electrification of the tramway, and it didn't begin providing electricity for the tramway until 10 June 1905. The station was provided with coal from the nearby Dorothea Pit. By 1911, the station was part of the Newcastle upon Tyne Electric Supply Company's system.

After closing, the station was used as a central garage by the National Coal Board. The station's generating hall still stands today, along with two smaller associated buildings, and they are Grade II listed. The generating hall is a single-gabled yellow brick built building with red brick dressings and felt roofing, and is currently one of a number of workshops on the Philadeliphia Complex. Persimmon Homes applied to refurbish the building and bring it into mixed commercial use, as part of a refurbishment of the Philadelphia Complex. The Northern National Restoration Group moved into the hall in November 2019.
