= Consett Power Station =

- Country: England
- Location: Derwentside, County Durham, North East England
- Coordinates: 54.850109°N 1.848898°W
- Commission date: 1903
- Decommission date: 1980
- Operator: Consett Iron Company

Thermal power station
- Primary fuel: Coal

Consett Power Station refers to numerous, now demolished coal-fired power stations situated on various sites around Consett in County Durham, North East England.

== History ==
=== Knitsley Lane Power Station ===
In 1903, a small power station was constructed on Knitsley Lane in Consett. It was built and operated by the Cleveland and Durham County Electric Power Company, and generated electricity using two generating sets driven by oil-fuelled engines. It supplied electricity over a small area of south west Consett, using an underground cable stretching from the station to Derwent Street. This closed only a couple of years later, in 1906, when the generating sets were removed and the building converted into a substation, providing a step down from 20 kV to 3 kV for local distribution.

=== Templetown Power Station ===
The Knitsley Lane station was taken out of operation because of the opening of the Consett Iron Company's own power stations. This was situated in the Templetown area of Consett, and was used to supply electricity to the iron and steel works in the town, as well as to local houses. The station was closed in 1961, when electricity supply was provided by the Central Electricity Generating Board.

=== Central Power Station ===
Between 1943 and 1980, the Consett Iron Company built the Central Power Station to provide the works with an electricity supply. The large building had two chimneys and two cooling towers. The station was closed along with the steel works in September 1980.
