= South Shore Road power station =

Coal-fired power station in North East England

- Country: England
- Location: Gateshead
- Coordinates: 54.969°N 1.595°W
- Status: Demolished
- Owners: Durham Electrical Power Distribution Company; Newcastle upon Tyne Electric Supply Company

Thermal power station
- Primary fuel: Coal

South Shore Road power station was a coal-fired power station situated on the River Tyne at Gateshead, North East England. The station was built by the Durham Electrical Power Distribution Company in the early twentieth century. Ownership of the station was handed over to the Newcastle upon Tyne Electric Supply Company in June 1932 when they bought the Durham company. During the Second World War a warden post was situated at the power station. The site of the power station, near the Baltic Centre for Contemporary Art, has since been cleared, and an office development is being constructed on it.
