= Hastings Power Station =

Former gas turbine power station

- Country: England
- Location: Hastings, East Sussex
- Coordinates: 50°52′07″N 00°35′39″E
- Status: Decommissioned and demolished
- Construction began: 1964
- Commission date: 1966
- Decommission date: Decommissioned late 1980s, demolished 2003
- Owner: Central Electricity Generating Board
- Operator: Central Electricity Generating Board

Thermal power station
- Primary fuel: Distillate fuel oil
- Turbine technology: Open cycle gas turbine
- Chimneys: 2 (200 ft; 61 m) reinforced concrete
- Cooling source: Cooling water
- Cogeneration?: No

Power generation
- Units operational: 2 × 55 MW
- Make and model: AP4 Rolls-Royce/AEI sets
- Nameplate capacity: 110 MW
- Annual net output: see chart in text

Hastings Power Station was a gas turbine power station situated in Hastings in East Sussex, England. It was built on the site of the Broomgrove coal-fired power station. When the power station was completed in 1966 it had two 55-megawatt (MW) gas turbine generating sets; the first set was commissioned in January 1966 and the second two months later in March.

== Specifications ==
=== Infrastructure ===
Building

The station consisted of a steel framed building clad with 14-inch (360 mm) thick brick walls without windows. The access doors were double-skinned to reduce noise emissions. The compressor intakes, at each end of the station, were at roof level. Silencing was provided at the air intakes by attenuators fitted between the exhaust gas ducting and the bases of the two chimney stacks.

Chimneys

Exhaust gases entered the exhaust casing at 450 degrees Celsius (840 °F) and left the 200 ft high chimneys at 300 degrees Celsius (570 °F). The chimneys were concrete, lined with heat- and acid-resistant bricks and a stainless steel 'cap'. About 1.4 million cubic feet per minute (670 m^{3}/s) of gas containing 19% oxygen was exhausted from each chimney at a velocity of ~135 ft/s (41 m/s; 92 mph).

Cooling water

Cooling water for the station auxiliaries and alternator was drawn from a local pond, through a small independent mechanical draught-tower.

Emergency generator

An emergency Diesel generator-driven exciter set was housed in a separate building. In the event of a system shut down, the generator was capable of driving sufficient auxiliaries to start up, under black start conditions, and put on full load, using both main turbines consecutively.

Fuel oil

The gas turbine fuel oil supplies were held in five vertical main oil storage tanks, with a total capacity of 4,440 tonnes - equivalent to little more than 130 hours continuous generating at full load. Fuel was delivered by rail to the station's own siding located off the Hastings to Ashford Railway line, a few hundred metres north east of Ore railway station.

=== Power plant ===
Gas generators

Rolls-Royce gas generators were used. With little modification, these had been adapted to burn diesel oil with a high degree of reliability. They were developed from the well-tried aircraft engine used in the Comet and Caravelle aircraft. It had a single-shaft engine with a 17-stage axial flow compressor and cannular combustion chamber, before reaching the three-stage turbine.

Turbine

There were two 55 MW AP4 Rolls-Royce/AEI sets. Four gas generators in 'box' formation powered a two-stage turbine having discs of 2.5% nickel chrome and a stator of Nimonic 80A. The turbine blades were also forged from Nimonic 80A and were, at the time, the largest Nimonic forging ever made.

Alternator

The alternator was designed to operate at 3,000 rpm and was coupled to the turbine via a clutch. The main and pilot exciters were gear-driven from the end of the alternator shaft at 1,000 rpm.

=== Automatic control ===
The station was controlled from the Grid Control Centre at East Grinstead. But it could also be controlled locally. The main turbines and auxiliaries were controlled with manual overriding features. The main turbine sets could achieve a load of 10 MW from the pressing of a button within 2 minutes and 40 seconds. From the stabilizing load of 10 MW, the full capacity of 55 MW could be achieved in a matter of seconds.

This fast start-up of a power-station was particularly useful for supplying the national electricity grid at very short notice where sharp drops in supply occurred.

== Electricity output ==
Electricity output, in GWh, from Hasting power station over the period 1968–82

== Decline and closure ==
The station was built before the OPEC crisis of the 1973–74. As oil-based fuels increased in price, the station was deemed uneconomic and was mothballed in 1979. It received a reprieve when turbine Number 1 was recommissioned in 1983 (Hastings is not on the CEGB's Statistical Yearbook list of gas turbine power stations in 1984/5 or 1985/6) to compensate for a national deficit of power generators caused by the closure of some coal-fired stations during the coal miners' strike. By the late 1980s, the turbines and other plant were either stripped from the station or stolen by scrap dealers. In 2000, an arson attack on illegally dumped rubber tyres within the building caused considerable damage. After the fire, poisonous blue asbestos was discovered which caused a panic within the local area and a 500-meter evacuation was ordered so the site could be investigated. The station was demolished in 2003.
