= Bulls Bridge Power Station =

280 MW open-cycle gas-turbine power station at Bull's Bridge, Hayes in west London

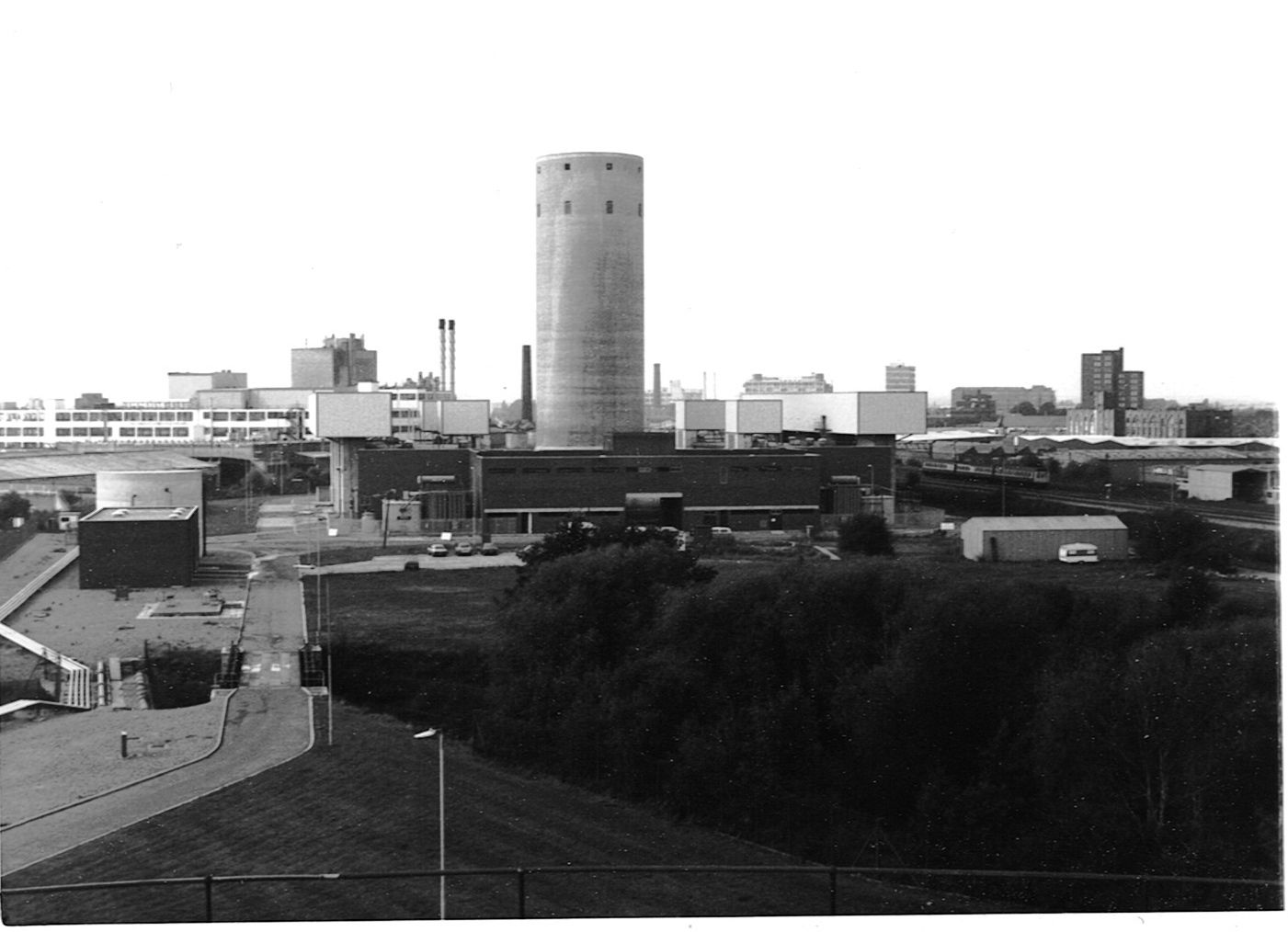
- Bulls Bridge OCGT
- Country: England
- Location: Greater London
- Coordinates: 51.50200°N 0.40900°W
- Status: Decommissioned and demolished
- Commission date: June 1981
- Decommission date: 1993
- Owners: Central Electricity Generating Board (1980–1990); Powergen (1990–1993)
- Operator: As owner

Thermal power station
- Primary fuel: Gas oil
- Chimneys: 1

Power generation
- Units operational: 4 × 70 MW
- Make and model: Rolls-Royce Olympus gas turbine
- Units decommissioned: All
- Nameplate capacity: 280 MW
- Annual net output: 4.697 GWh (1985/6)

External links
- Commons: Related media on Commons

Bulls Bridge Power Station was a 280 MW open-cycle gas-turbine power station at Bull's Bridge, Hayes in west London. It was decommissioned in 1993 and later demolished.

== History ==
The station was built, owned and operated by the CEGB as a stand-alone open cycle GT station and was commissioned in June 1981 but was later mothballed. It occupied a 25-acre (10 ha) site on either side of Yeading Brook, to the south of the Paddington main line and north of the Grand Union Canal, at its junction with the Paddington Arm.

== Plant ==
It was built as a peak lopping and rapid response plant to augment base load generation. It had a total generating capacity of 280 MW. It comprised four 70 MW generator sets each one being powered by four industrial Olympus gas generators, two at either end of the central alternator. It was connected electrically to the North Hyde 66 kV substation. By 1989 the gross capability was given as 3 × 70 MW plus 1 × 35 MW.

Bulls Bridge typically ran at full power for intervals of 10 minutes to 1 hour. As a result of the UK miners' strike (1984–1985) the station was re-opened in the 1980s, During the year ending 31 March 1986 Bulls Bridge supplied 4.697 GWh of electricity, it's thermal efficiency was 20.02 per cent, and the load factor was 0.5 per cent.

== Design ==
The design of Bulls Bridge power station was of sufficient merit that the Royal Institute of British Architects (RIBA) commissioned a set of photographs of the station.

== Monitoring ==
The operation of the gas turbines and the rest of the plant was closely monitored. Key operating parameters of the station's gas turbine engines were as follows.

Bulls Bridge gas turbine operating parameters
Engine parameter	Working range
Low pressure spool speed	6200 – 6500 rpm
High pressure spool speed	7100 – 7700 rpm
Low pressure compressor exit temperature	365 – 385 K
High pressure compressor exit temperature	530 – 590 K
HP compressor exit pressure	750 – 790 kPa
LP compressor exit pressure	195 – 220 kPa
Power turbine entry pressure	210 – 270 kPa
Power turbine entry temperature	750 – 875 K
Fuel flow	45 – 65 MW
Intake depression	0 – 34.5 kPa
Vibration	All values

== Closure ==
On privatisation, the station was owned and run by Powergen, and ceased generating in 1993. The site has since been redeveloped and the station demolished. The western parcel of land is occupied by a British Airways engineering centre.
