= Thor Cogeneration Power Station =

- The proposed Thor Cogeneration Power Station
- Country: England
- Location: County Durham, North East England
- Coordinates: 54.603145°N 1.202748°W
- Status: Undeveloped
- Commission date: 2012 (planned)
- Operator: PX Limited

Thermal power station
- Primary fuel: Natural gas
- Cogeneration?: Yes

Power generation
- Nameplate capacity: 1,020 MW

Thor Cogeneration is a planned, but undeveloped, gas-fired cogeneration plant, which was to be built on Seal Sands near Billingham, in County Durham, North East England.

== Development ==
On 19 January 2007, newly established business venture Thor Cogeneration, a subsidiary of Teesside-based PX Group, announced plans for a new power station on Teesside. The station is proposed as a 1,020 megawatt (MW) combined heat and power combined cycle gas turbine plant. Stockton Borough Council gave their approval for the station in April 2007. The station's licence for the generation of electricity was also granted later in 2007. On 28 August 2008, government approval for the station to be built was granted by Energy minister Malcolm Wicks. Construction was expected to begin in 2009, with operations predicted for early in 2012.

The development did not progress beyond the design stage.

Thor Cogeneration Limited held an Electricity Generation licence under the Electricity Act 1989. In May 2013 Thor Cogeneration Limited applied to Ofgem to have the Licence revoked. The Licence was revoked with effect from 22 September 2013.

== Proposed specification ==
The station would use two gas-fired generators, with excess heat being used to make steam to drive a further generator. Electricity generated would be distributed to the National Grid. As well as generating electricity, the station would provide heat to the nearby, SABIC operated North Tees Works oil refinery, in the form of steam. Natural gas, the station's fuel, would be supplied to the station by a pipeline, with a short connection to an existing pipeline to the north. The station will require 20% less gas per MW generated than current operating gas-fired stations.

The station was expected to be able to achieve a 58% efficiency rating by using the latest gas turbine technology. It will create 60% less carbon emissions than current coal-fired power stations. It would be cooled by using an air cooled condenser, avoiding the need to extract from or discharge water into the nearby River Tees. 1,000 people would be employed during the construction and 60 would have been employed when the station is operational.
