= Wakefield power station =

Series of two former coal-fired power stations

Wakefield Power Station
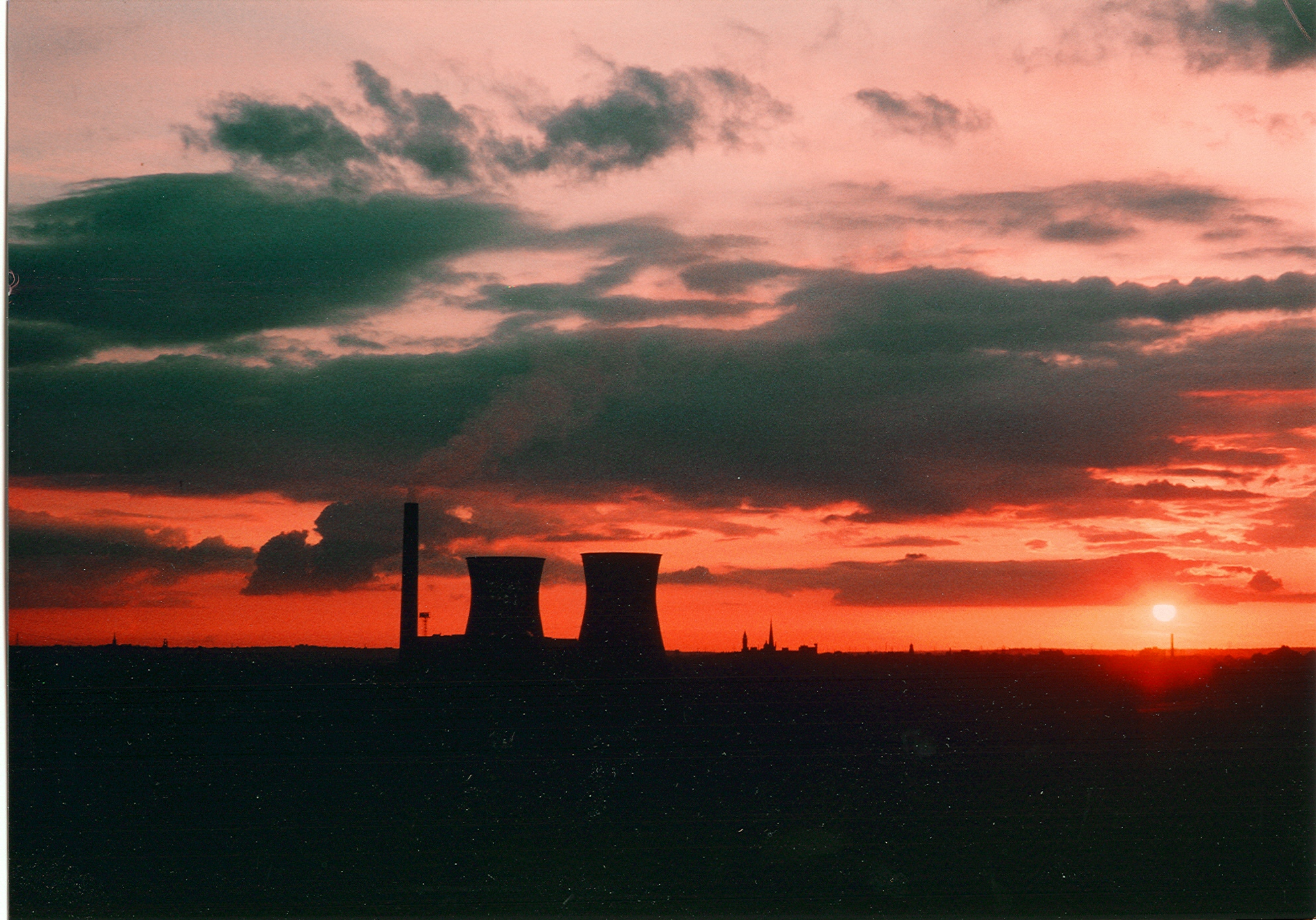
- Wakefield Power Station in July 1980
- Country: England
- Location: Agbrigg, Wakefield
- Coordinates: 53.67368°N 1.47355°W
- Status: Decommissioned
- Construction began: A station: ? B station: 1952
- Commission date: A station: 1898; B station: 1955
- Decommission date: A station: ? B station: 1991

Thermal power station
- Primary fuel: Coal

Power generation
- Nameplate capacity: 240 MW

External links
- Commons: Related media on Commons

The Wakefield power stations refers to a series of two coal-fired power stations situated on the River Calder at Agbrigg south east of Wakefield, serving much of West Yorkshire. The first station on the site, Wakefield A power station was constructed for Wakefield Corporation in the late-1880s. A second station, Wakefield B power station, was brought into operation in the mid-1950s and was decommissioned in 1991.

The power station was situated between the A638 Doncaster Road and the southern bank of the River Calder, just east of the point where the railway line (originally built by the Lancashire and Yorkshire Railway in 1848), from Wakefield Kirkgate to Oakenshaw junction, crosses the navigation.

== History ==
=== Wakefield A ===
The power station was opened on 15 July 1898 and was part fired by refuse and coal. These supplied steam to 3 x 130 kW engine-alternators. These were used until its replacement with the second power station on this site. It had a turbo generator that was capable of 20,000 hp (15 MW).

By 1923 the generating plant at Wakefield comprised 1 × 250 kW and 2 × 400 kW reciprocating machines and generators and 1 × 600 kW, 1 × 1,600 kW and 3 × 3,000 kW turbo-alternators. This was a total of 9.25 MW these were fed with up to 101,500 lb/hr of steam. The maximum load on the system was 3,275 MW and there were 8,756 connections. In 1923 Wakefield generated 7,511 MWh and sold 5,285 MWh giving a revenue of £56,370 and realising a surplus of revenue over expenses of £25,966 to Wakefield Corporation. In 1926 a new 7,500 kW turbo alternator supplied by English Electric was commissioned.

=== Wakefield B ===
Wakefield B was constructed between 1952 and 1957. It opened on 27 September 1957 and generated 240 MW of electricity. The site covered 55 acres where there were four English Electric 62.5 MW turbo generators, with a speed of 3,000 RPM. The four Foster Wheeler boilers consumed 28 tons of coal per hour, whilst the condensers used 40,000 gallons of water per minute. The boilers were rated at 69 kg/s at 62.06 bar and 482 °C. The tallest chimney stood 350 feet above the ground. Between 1955 and 1986, the station consumed 18 million tons of coal and produced 35,000,000,000 kW hours of electricity (35 TWh).

The generating capacity and output from Wakefield B is given in the following table.

Wakefield B electricity capacity and output
Year	1957	1958	1960	1961	1962	1963	1967	1972	1979	1982
Installed capacity, MW	168	224	224	240	240	240	250	250	250	250
Electricity output, GWh	641.892	1,271.506	1379.38	1668.5	1634.3	1666.586	1455.599	1,176.728	907.89	640.209

A science fiction film was shot in the power station in 1991.

Wakefield B was finally demolished at 9 am on 1 December 1991.
