= Sunderland Power Station =

Former coal-fired power station

- Official name: Sunderland power station
- Country: England
- Location: Tyne and Wear, North East England
- Coordinates: 54.911609°N 1.396324°W
- Status: Decommissioned and demolished
- Construction began: 1898
- Commission date: c.1900 (extended 1926)
- Decommission date: 1976
- Owners: Sunderland Corporation (1901-1948); British Electricity Authority (1948–1955); Central Electricity Authority (1955–1957); Central Electricity Generating Board (1948-1976)
- Operator: As owner

Thermal power station
- Primary fuel: Coal

External links
- Commons: Related media on Commons

Sunderland Power Station was a coal-fired power station situated on the bank of the River Wear, in the city centre of Sunderland, in Tyne and Wear, North East England. The station was initially built in 1901 by the Sunderland Corporation and had several extensions added.

== History ==
At opening the station was equipped with five Clayton Lancashire boilers these fed steam to

- two Bellis engines each coupled to 125 kW Silvertown dynamos.
- three Bellis 500 HP engines coupled to Silvertown four-pole dynamos.

Shortly after opening the above was supplemented with two 700 kW sets.

In 1904 the station contained eight Belliss and Morcom engines; five coupled to continuous current Silvertown dynamos, aggregating 1,280 kW and three sets coupled to three-phase alternators by the Electrical Co with a total output of 2,260 kW making 3,530 kW in aggregate.

In 1923 the plant comprised six 750 kW reciprocating machines, and 1 × 2,000 kW, 1 × 5,000 kW and 1 × 6,000 kW turbo-alternators, a total generating capacity of 17,500 kW. These were supplied from boilers with a total output of 326,000 pounds per hour (41.1 kg/s) of steam. In 1923 the station generated 18.747 GWh of electricity, and sold 15.319 GWh for £128,326 making a surplus of revenue over profit of £56,559 for the Corporation.

New plant was added to the station in 1925-26 (LP sets) and in 1942 (HP sets) and some of the old plant was removed. When completed the generating plant comprised two Brush 20 MW and two Fraser & Chalmers-GEC 10 MW turbo-alternators. The boiler plant comprised three Clarke Chapman 121,000 lb/hr, 450 psi and 850 °F (15.2 kg/s, 31.0 bar and 454 °C); two Clarke Chapman, two Vickers Spearing and two Spearing boilers each producing 50,000 lb/hr of steam at 260 psi and 660 °F (6.30 kg/s, 17.9 bar and 349 °C).

There was a concrete cooling tower with a capacity of 1.65 million gallons per hour (2.08 m^{3}/s) and a wooden cooling tower with a capacity of 1.25 million gallons per hour (1.57 m^{3}/s).

Upon nationalisation of the British electricity supply industry in 1948 ownership of the power station was vested in the British Electricity Authority (1948–55), then the Central Electricity Authority (1955–57), and the Central Electricity Generating Board (1958–76).

By 1971 the station had a generating capacity of 40 MW. The coal fired boilers had the capacity to deliver 363,000 lb/h (45.7 kg/s) of steam at 400 psi (27.6 bar) and 427 °C.

The generating capacity and output from Sunderland power station is given in the following table.

Sunderland electricity capacity and output
Year	1954	1955	1956	1957	1958	1961	1962	1963	1967	1972
Installed capacity, MW	49	49	49	49	49	60	60	60	40	40
Electricity output, GWh	142.96	154.06	123.21	109.33	118.12	82.53	129.79	134.6	59.1	69.60

The station operated into the 1970s, but in October 1975, the Central Electricity Generating Board gave 12 months notification of the station's closure. It finally closed on 25 October 1976, with a generating capacity of 34 megawatts. The station was then demolished in 1979. The cooling tower in particular was demolished in February of that year. The power station's site is now occupied by a PC World outlet.

In 1962 the station was featured in L. S. Lowry's painting of Sunderland's dockside. The painting is now in the collection of Sunderland Museum and Winter Gardens.
