= Eston Grange Power Station =

Proposed power station in England

Eston Grange Power Project
- Official name: Eston Grange Power Project
- Country: England, United Kingdom
- Location: Redcar and Cleveland.
- Coordinates: 54.579°N 1.161°W
- Status: Cancelled
- Commission date: 2012 (expected)
- Owner: Centrica

Thermal power station
- Primary fuel: Coal

Power generation
- Nameplate capacity: 850 MW

External links
- Website: www.estongrange.co.uk

Eston Grange Power Station (also known as Teesside Low Carbon Project) was a proposed power station to be situated near to Eston in Redcar and Cleveland. If built, it would have been the UK's first pre-combustion carbon capture and storage (CCS) plant. The station could have generated up to 850 megawatts of electricity, enough to supply around a million people with electricity. The station would use standard oil refinery technology to turn gasified coal into hydrogen and carbon dioxide.

The power station was not built following the cancellation of the UK's Carbon Capture and Storage competition in 2015.

== Development ==
The station was proposed by Centrica in the mid-2000s. The station would have been built on a brownfield site, and use integrated gasification combined cycle (IGCC) technology to generate electricity. The CCS technology used in the power station would have been of the pre-combustion type, capturing approximately 5 million tonnes of CO_{2} per year. The CO_{2} would be transported via a 225 km pipeline to saline formations, the pipeline being oversized to allow for use by other emitters. This was planned to include Lynemouth power station as part of the North CCS Cluster. Both projects would share a common pipeline for the transport of CO_{2}, and use the same offshore storage site in the North Sea. There would be the possibility of other emitters joining this network in the future. In 2011, the Eston Grange project was planned to open for commercial operation by 2015.

In 2012, the project - now named Teesside Low Carbon Project - was shortlisted in the Department of Energy and Climate Change Carbon Capture and Storage competition. This would have involved a 330MWe syngas power station, with 90% of the CO_{2} captured and stored offshore in the North Sea.

In 2014, the project was not shortlisted for further consideration in the Carbon Capture and Storage competition. In November 2015, the £1bn competition itself was cancelled by Chancellor George Osborne.
