= Cowes Power Station =

Power station on the Isle of Wight

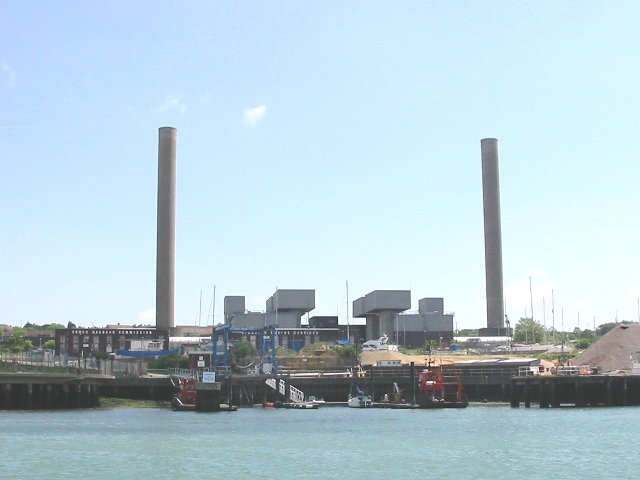
- Cowes power station
- Country: England
- Location: East Cowes, Isle of Wight
- Coordinates: 50.7459°N 1.2864°W
- Commission date: July 1982
- Operator: RWE Generation UK
- Employees: 3

Thermal power station
- Primary fuel: Light fuel oil
- Turbine technology: Open cycle gas turbine
- Chimneys: 2 (80 m)
- Combined cycle?: No
- Cogeneration?: No

Power generation
- Units operational: 2 × 70 MW
- Make and model: Rolls-Royce Olympus gas turbines; C.A. Parsons & Co generators
- Nameplate capacity: 140 MW

External links
- Commons: Related media on Commons

Cowes power station (or Kingston power station) is a 140MW Open Cycle Gas Turbine station powered by two 70MW units. Located in East Cowes, the station is the Isle of Wight's only conventional power generation source other than power from the mainland. The station was built in 1982 at a cost of £30 million. The station is owned and operated by RWE Generation UK.

Both units run on light fuel oil and operate at either peak time or when the grid requires frequency response. The station is either run locally or by remote from the Hythe Dispatch Desk, located at Hythe Power Station. The gas turbine engines have a total output of 200,000 horsepower and use 762 litres (201 US gal) of fuel oil per minute when running at maximum output.

There was a 24 MW coal-fired power station at Cowes that was decommissioned on 15 March 1976.

In addition to electricity generated on the Isle of Wight, power is transmitted from the mainland through subsea cables. The first connection was in 1947 by a 33 kV cable from Nursling near Southampton to Cowes. A second cable was installed in 1964, this was the first 132 kV oil-filled cable in Britain, and was constructed by AEI. A new 132 kV link was commissioned in July 1972, this was the first major cable contract undertaken by the Southern Electricity Board.
