= Derby power station =

Former coal-fired power station in England

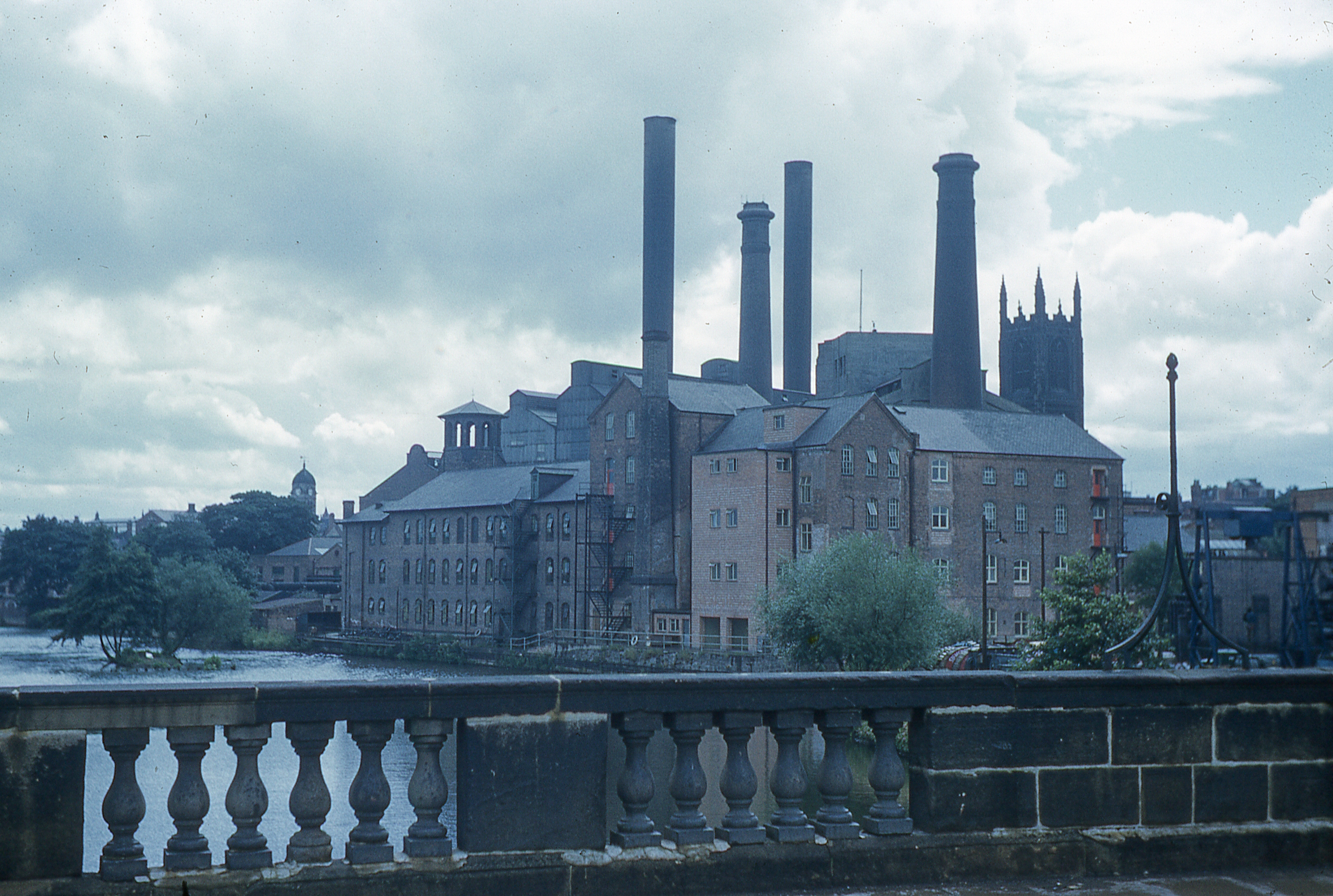
- Derby Power Station in 1957
- Country: United Kingdom
- Location: Derby, Derbyshire
- Coordinates: 52°55′33″N 01°28′35″W
- Status: Decommissioned and demolished
- Construction began: 1892
- Commission date: 10 October 1893
- Decommission date: 1969
- Owners: Derby Corporation (1892–1948); British Electricity Authority (1948–1955); Central Electricity Authority (1955–1957); Central Electricity Generating Board (1958–1972)
- Operator: As owner

Thermal power station
- Primary fuel: Coal
- Turbine technology: Steam driven reciprocating engines and steam turbo-alternators
- Chimneys: 4
- Cooling source: River water
- Annual revenue: £67,691 (1923)

Power generation
- Units operational: 1 × 30 MW, 1 × 20 MW, 1 × 10 MW, 1 × 0.5 MW (1950s)
- Make and model: Parsons
- Units decommissioned: All
- Nameplate capacity: 65.5 MW (1950s)
- Annual net output: 219.7 GWh (1955)

Derby power station supplied electricity to the city of Derby and the surrounding area from 1893 to 1969. The power station was built and operated by Derby Corporation and started generating electricity in October 1893. It was located in Silkmill Lane in the town centre adjacent to the River Derwent from which it drew its cooling water. The power station was extended in the 1920s and 1940s. It was closed in 1969 and was subsequently demolished.

== History ==
In 1890 Derby Corporation applied for a provisional order to generate and supply electricity to the city of Derby, Derbyshire. The Derby Corporation Electric Lighting Order 1890 was granted by the Board of Trade and was confirmed by Parliament by the Electric Lighting Orders (No. 5) Act 1890 (53 & 54 Vict. c. cxc). The corporation electricity undertaking constructed a power station on a triangular site (52°55′32.6″N 1°28′35.4″W) bounded by Sowter Road, Silkmill Lane and the River Derwent. It had an initial generating capacity of three Siemens continuous current arc lighters, three Siemens 30 kW alternators for the private lighting and three 60kW Siemens totalling alternators 572 kW. These were all driven Browett Lindley steam engines. The supply of electricity commenced on 10 October 1893.

The first extensions consisted of two 150kW. Siemens Browett-Lindley sets then a 700kW Ferranti set followed at short intervals by two more Ferranti machines of the same size. Then in 1904 three 300kW Parsons continuous current turbo-generators were added.

In the year ending March 1898 the station sold a total of 350.33 MWh powering 20,418 lamps (each of 8 candle-power). The maximum load on the system was 336 kW, and there was 317 consumers.

Traction current was supplied to the municipal tram system from 1904.

In 1916 a 4,000 kW Parsons turbo alternator set was introduced running at directly at 3000 rpm.

During the First World War British Celanese refused to take an electricity supply from Derby power station because they were generating electricity on a larger scale and more cheaply than the municipal supply.

== New boiler house 1921 ==
A new boiler house was commissioned in 1921, at a cost of £120,000.

=== Specification ===
By 1923 the steam plant at the station had a capacity of 260,000 lb/h (32.8 kg/s) and supplied steam to:

- 3 × 2,000 kW steam turbine driven alternating current (AC) generators
- 1 × 4,000 kW steam turbine driven AC generator
- 1 × 7,00 kW steam turbine driven AC generator (1922)
- 3 × 750 kW steam turbine driven direct current (DC) generators

These provided a total generating capacity of 2,250 kW.

The station supplied a range of electrical current:

- 3-phase, 50 Hz, alternating current at 230 & 400 Volts
- Single phase, 50 Hz, AC at 200 Volts
- Direct current (DC) at 460 & 230 Volts

=== Operations ===
In 1923 the maximum load on the system was 10,138 kW, and there was a connected load of 28,572 kW. The power was sold for the following uses:

Derby power station electricity sold 1921 to 1923
User	Usage MWh		
User	1921	1922	1923
Lighting and domestic	2267.98	2425.11	2818.38
Public lighting	204.30	175.18	200.25
Traction	1709.29	1679.77	1714.70
Power	15,254.42	11,598.29	14,402.05
Total	19,435.99	15,878.35	19,135.38

The sale of electricity provided an income to the corporation of £39,691 in 1923. The surplus of revenue over expenses for generating electricity was £67,509.

New extensions to the plant were built in the late 1920s. In 1926 a 10,000kW Parson set was added along with 3 x 45,000 Ib/hr boilers and another Parson set of 20,000 kW in 1929 fed by 2 x 60,000 Ib/hr boilers. The official opening of the extended site on the south side of Silkmill Lane took place on 28 March 1930. This was supplemented in 1941 with a 30,000 kW Parsons set fed by 3 x 130,000 Ib/hr boilers.

== Derby power station and electricity policy ==
Under the terms of the Electricity (Supply) Act 1926 (16 & 17 Geo. 5. c. 51) the Central Electricity Board (CEB) was established. The CEB identified high efficiency ‘selected’ power station that would supply electricity most effectively; Derby was designated a selected station. The CEB also constructed the national grid (1927–33) to connect power stations within a region.

It was noted in the inter-war period that all the streets in many prosperous Southern towns and in some Northern towns such as Birkenhead, Derby and Hull had been wired for electricity.

Upon nationalisation of the British electricity supply industry in 1948 under the provisions of the Electricity Act 1947 (10 & 11 Geo. 6. c. 54) the Derby electricity undertaking was abolished, ownership of Derby power station was vested in the British Electricity Authority, and subsequently the Central Electricity Authority and the Central Electricity Generating Board (CEGB). At the same time the electricity distribution and sales responsibilities of the Derby electricity undertaking were transferred to the East Midlands Electricity Board (EMEB).

== Nationalised power station ==
=== Specification ===
The plant installed by the mid-1950s comprised:

- Boilers
  - 3 × 45,000 lb/h (5.67 kg/s), Babcock & Wilcox pulverised coal-fired boilers, supplying steam at 310 psi at 710 °F to 750 °F (21.4 bar at 377 to 399 °C).
  - 2 × 60,000 lb/h (7.56 kg/s) International Combustion pulverised coal-fired boilers, steam conditions as above.
  - 4 × 110,000 lb/h (13.86 kg/s) International Combustion pulverised coal-fired boilers, steam conditions as above.

These boilers had a total steam evaporative capacity of 695,000 lb/h (87.6 kg/s). The boilers fed the following generating plant:

- Generating plant
  - 1 × 30 MW Parsons turbo-alternator operating at 33 kV
  - 1 × 20 MW Parsons turbo-alternator operating at 6.6 kV
  - 1 × 10 MW Parsons turbo-alternator operating at 6.6 kV
  - 1 × 5.5 MW Parsons turbo-alternator operating at 6.6 kV

These machines had a total generating capacity of 65.5 MW.

=== Operations ===
==== Incident ====
An engineer was killed at the power station in November 1951. An inquest found that an error of judgement by engineers undertaking an electricity switching operation caused an explosion which killed a shift engineer. The accident could have been prevented by a transformer switch but this could not be delivered for two years.

Operating details of the station over the period 1946–63 were as follows:

Derby power station operations 1946–63
Year	Running hours (or load factor %)	Output capacity MW	Electricity supplied GWh	Thermal efficiency %
1946	(46.4 %)		230.9	21.87
1954	6112	62	201.00	21.01
1955	6584	62	219.66	21.03
1956	6120	62	218.22	20.87
1957	6006	62	189.52	20.32
1958	5199	62	178.64	20.78
1961	25.3 %	56	130.81	19.35
1962	31.9 %	56	156.39	19.92
1963	30.35 %	39	148.88	19.87
1967	9.4 %	47	38.9	17.80

The output capacity data demonstrates how machinery was gradually decommissioned.

== Closure ==
The oldest part of Derby power station, north of Silkmill Lane, closed in 1963 and was demolished. The original site retains a connection with electricity as the location of the operational 132 kV Silk Mill substation. The remainder of the station, south of Silkmill Lane, operated until 1969 when it closed. The plant, including the four chimneys, was demolished over the period November 1971 to February 1972.

== Railway power station ==
In addition to the statutory public-supply Derby power station, the Midland Railway constructed electricity generating stations to meet its own demand for electricity.

The first private supply power station was built in Calvert Street in 1893. It supplied electricity to the station offices, the locomotive works offices, and the Midland Hotel. In 1910 it was replaced by a new power station built across the Derby canal at the rear of the locomotive works. This power station was still operating in 1946 when it supplied 19,675 MWh from steam generation and 756 MWh from a waste heat system. The power station had closed by 1957.

== See also ==
- Timeline of the UK electricity supply industry
- List of power stations in England
- Derwent power station
- Wilington power station
