= List of acts of the Parliament of the United Kingdom from 1890 =

This is a complete list of acts of the Parliament of the United Kingdom for the year 1890.

Note that the first parliament of the United Kingdom was held in 1801; parliaments between 1707 and 1800 were either parliaments of Great Britain or of Ireland). For acts passed up until 1707, see the list of acts of the Parliament of England and the list of acts of the Parliament of Scotland. For acts passed from 1707 to 1800, see the list of acts of the Parliament of Great Britain. See also the list of acts of the Parliament of Ireland.

For acts of the devolved parliaments and assemblies in the United Kingdom, see the list of acts of the Scottish Parliament, the list of acts of the Northern Ireland Assembly, and the list of acts and measures of Senedd Cymru; see also the list of acts of the Parliament of Northern Ireland.

The number shown after each act's title is its chapter number. Acts passed before 1963 are cited using this number, preceded by the year(s) of the reign during which the relevant parliamentary session was held; thus the Union with Ireland Act 1800 is cited as "39 & 40 Geo. 3 c. 67", meaning the 67th act passed during the session that started in the 39th year of the reign of George III and which finished in the 40th year of that reign. Note that the modern convention is to use Arabic numerals in citations (thus "41 Geo. 3" rather than "41 Geo. III"). Acts of the last session of the Parliament of Great Britain and the first session of the Parliament of the United Kingdom are both cited as "41 Geo. 3". Acts passed from 1963 onwards are simply cited by calendar year and chapter number.

All modern acts have a short title, e.g. the Local Government Act 2003. Some earlier acts also have a short title given to them by later acts, such as by the Short Titles Act 1896.

== 53 & 54 Vict. ==
The fifth session of the 24th Parliament of the United Kingdom, which met from 11 February 1890 until 18 August 1890.

=== Public general acts ===
Short title	Citation	Royal assent
Long title
Consolidated Fund (No. 1) Act 1890 (repealed)	53 & 54 Vict. c. 1	29 March 1890
An Act to apply certain sums out of the Consolidated Fund to the service of the years ending on the thirty-first day of March one thousand eight hundred and eighty-nine, one thousand eight hundred and ninety, and one thousand eight hundred and ninety-one. (Repealed by Statute Law Revision Act 1908 (8 Edw. 7. c. 49))
Crown Office Act 1890	53 & 54 Vict. c. 2	29 March 1890
An Act to abolish the Office of Secretary of Presentations, and to provide for the performance of the duties attached to that Office.
County Councils Association Expenses Act 1890 (repealed)	53 & 54 Vict. c. 3	29 March 1890
An Act to remove doubts as to the Legality of certain Payments by County Councils. (Repealed by Local Government (Financial Provisions) Act 1963 (c. 46))
Army (Annual) Act 1890 (repealed)	53 & 54 Vict. c. 4	29 March 1890
An Act to provide, during twelve months, for the Discipline and Regulation of the Army. (Repealed by Madras and Bombay Armies Act 1893 (56 & 57 Vict. c. 62), Statute Law Revision Act 1908 (8 Edw. 7. c. 49), Statute Law Revision Act 1953 (2 & 3 Eliz. 2. c. 5) and Revision of the Army and Air Force Acts (Transitional Provisions) Act 1955 (3 & 4 Eliz. 2. c. 20))
Lunacy Act 1890 (repealed)	53 & 54 Vict. c. 5	29 March 1890
An Act to consolidate certain of the Enactments respecting Lunatics. (Repealed for England and Wales by Mental Health Act 1959 (7 & 8 Eliz. 2. c. 72) and for Scotland and Northern Ireland by Mental Health (Scotland) Act 1960 (8 & 9 Eliz. 2. c. 61))
South Indian Railway Purchase Act 1890 (repealed)	53 & 54 Vict. c. 6	2 May 1890
An Act to empower the Secretary of State in Council of India to raise Money in the United Kingdom for the Purchase of the South Indian Railway; and for other purposes relating thereto. (Repealed by East India Loans Act 1937 (1 Edw. 8 & 1 Geo. 6. c. 14))
Commissioners for Oaths Amendment Act 1890 (repealed)	53 & 54 Vict. c. 7	22 May 1890
An Act to amend the Commissioners for Oaths Act, 1889. (Note: Commissioners for Oaths Act 1889 (52 & 53 Vict. c. 10)) (Repealed by County Courts (Amendment) Act 1934 (24 & 25 Geo. 5. c. 17))
Customs and Inland Revenue Act 1890 (repealed)	53 & 54 Vict. c. 8	9 June 1890
An Act to grant certain Duties of Customs and Inland Revenue, to repeal and alter other Duties, and to amend the Laws relating to Customs and Inland Revenue. (Repealed by Statute Law (Repeals) Act 1986 (c. 12))
Merchant Shipping Act 1890 (repealed)	53 & 54 Vict. c. 9	9 June 1890
An Act to amend the Merchant Shipping Acts relating to Load-line. (Repealed by Merchant Shipping Act 1894 (57 & 58 Vict. c. 60))
Herring Fishery (Scotland) Act Amendment Act 1890 (repealed)	53 & 54 Vict. c. 10	4 July 1890
An Act to amend the Herring Fishery (Scotland) Act, 1889. (Repealed by Illegal Trawling (Scotland) Act 1934 (24 & 25 Geo. 5. c. 18))
Municipal Elections (Scotland) Act 1890 (repealed)	53 & 54 Vict. c. 11	4 July 1890
An Act to amend the Law relating to Municipal Elections in certain Burghs in Scotland. (Repealed by Local Government (Scotland) Act 1947 (10 & 11 Geo. 6. c. 43))
River Suck Drainage (Provision of Funds) Act 1890 (repealed)	53 & 54 Vict. c. 12	4 July 1890
An Act for providing Money for defraying Costs, Charges, and Expenses incurred and to be incurred by the Drainage Board for the River Suck Drainage District. (Repealed by Statute Law (Repeals) Act 1993 (c. 50))
Electric Lighting (Scotland) Act 1890 (repealed)	53 & 54 Vict. c. 13	4 July 1890
An Act to amend the Electric Lighting Acts, 1882 (Note: Electric Lighting Act 1882 (45 & 46 Vict. c. 56)) and 1888. (Note: Electric Lighting Act 1888 (51 & 52 Vict. c. 12)) (Repealed by Electricity Act 1947 (10 & 11 Geo. 6. c. 54))
Contagious Diseases (Animals) (Pleuro-pneumonia) Act 1890 (repealed)	53 & 54 Vict. c. 14	4 July 1890
An Act for conferring further Powers under the Contagious Diseases (Animals) Acts, 1878 to 1886, with respect to Pleuro-pneumonia. (Repealed by Diseases of Animals Act 1894 (57 & 58 Vict. c. 57))
Open Spaces Act 1890 (repealed)	53 & 54 Vict. c. 15	25 July 1890
An Act to amend the Open Spaces Acts. (Repealed by Open Spaces Act 1906 (6 Edw. 7. c. 25))
Working Classes Dwellings Act 1890 (repealed)	53 & 54 Vict. c. 16	25 July 1890
An Act to facilitate Gifts of Land for Dwellings for the Working Classes in Populous Places. (Repealed for England and Wales and Scotland by Charities Act 1960 (8 & 9 Eliz. 2. c. 58) and for Northern Ireland by Charities Act (Northern Ireland) 1964 (c. 33 (N.I.)))
Public Health (Rating of Orchards) Act 1890 (repealed)	53 & 54 Vict. c. 17	25 July 1890
An Act to amend the Laws relating to the Rating of Orchards for Sanitary purposes. (Repealed by Rating and Valuation Act 1925 (15 & 16 Geo. 5. c. 90))
Superannuation (War Department) Act 1890 (repealed)	53 & 54 Vict. c. 18	25 July 1890
An Act to amend the Law relating to the grant of Superannuation Allowances and Gratuities to certain Work men in the Manufacturing and Store Establishments of the War Department. (Repealed by Statute Law Revision Act 1950 (14 Geo. 6. c. 6))
Trustees Appointment Act 1890	53 & 54 Vict. c. 19	25 July 1890
An Act to facilitate the Appointment of new Trustees of Land held in Trust for Religious or Educational Purposes, and to make provision for vesting the Land in the Trustees for the time being. (Repealed for England and Wales by Charities Act 1960 (8 & 9 Eliz. 2. c. 58))
Public Health Amendment (Scotland) Act 1890 (repealed)	53 & 54 Vict. c. 20	25 July 1890
An Act to amend the Public Health (Scotland) Act, 1867, (Note: Public Health (Scotland) Act 1867 (30 & 31 Vict. c. 101)) in relation to Hospitals for Burghs. (Repealed by Public Health (Scotland) Act 1897 (60 & 61 Vict. c. 38))
Inland Revenue Regulation Act 1890 (repealed)	53 & 54 Vict. c. 21	25 July 1890
An Act to consolidate certain Enactments relating to the Regulation of the Inland Revenue. (Repealed by Commissioners for Revenue and Customs Act 2005 (c. 11))
Education Code (1890) Act 1890 (repealed)	53 & 54 Vict. c. 22	25 July 1890
An Act for the purpose of making operative certain Articles in the Education Code, 1890. (Repealed by Education Act 1918 (8 & 9 Geo. 5. c. 39))
Chancery of Lancaster Act 1890 (repealed)	53 & 54 Vict. c. 23	25 July 1890
An Act to further improve the Administration of Justice in the Court of Chancery of the County Palatine of Lancaster. (Repealed by Courts Act 1971 (c. 23))
Deeds of Arrangement Amendment Act 1890	53 & 54 Vict. c. 24	25 July 1890
An Act to amend the Law relating to Deeds of Arrangement.
Barracks Act 1890 (repealed)	53 & 54 Vict. c. 25	25 July 1890
An Act to make provision for building and enlarging Barracks and Camps in the United Kingdom, and in certain Colonies, and to amend the Law relating to the acquisition of Land for Military purposes. (Repealed by Statute Law (Repeals) Act 2008 (c. 12))
Western Australia Constitution Act 1890	53 & 54 Vict. c. 26	25 July 1890
An Act to enable Her Majesty to assent to a Bill for conferring a Constitution on Western Australia.
	Constitution Act 1889 (Note: Constitution Act 1889 (52 Vict. No. 23 (WA))) An Act to confer a Constitution on Western Australia, and to grant a Civil List to Her Majesty.	
Colonial Courts of Admiralty Act 1890	53 & 54 Vict. c. 27	25 July 1890
An Act to amend the Law respecting the exercise of Admiralty Jurisdiction in Her Majesty's Dominions and elsewhere out of the United Kingdom.
Consolidated Fund (No. 2) Act 1890 (repealed)	53 & 54 Vict. c. 28	25 July 1890
An Act to apply the sum of eleven million eight hundred and fifty thousand four hundred and thirty-six pounds out of the Consolidated Fund to the service of the year ending on the thirty-first day of March one thousand eight hundred and ninety-one. (Repealed by Statute Law Revision Act 1908 (8 Edw. 7. c. 49))
Intestates' Estates Act 1890 (repealed)	53 & 54 Vict. c. 29	25 July 1890
An Act to amend the Law by making better provision for the Widows of certain Intestates in the distribution of such Intestates' Property. (Repealed for England and Wales by Administration of Estates Act 1925 (15 & 16 Geo. 5. c. 23) and for Northern Ireland by Administration of Estates Act (Northern Ireland) 1955 (c. 24 (N.I.)))
Poor Law Acts (Ireland) Amendment Act 1890 (repealed)	53 & 54 Vict. c. 30	4 August 1890
An Act to amend the Poor Laws of Ireland in relation to Rating. (Repealed by Rates (Northern Ireland) Order 1972 (SI 1972/1633 (N.I. 16)))
Pauper Lunatic Asylums, Ireland, Superannuation Act 1890 (repealed)	53 & 54 Vict. c. 31	4 August 1890
An Act to amend the Law relating to the Superannuation of Officers and Servants of Pauper Lunatic Asylums in Ireland. (Repealed by Asylums Officers' Superannuation Act 1909 (9 Edw. 7. c. 48))
Anglo-German Agreement Act 1890 (repealed)	53 & 54 Vict. c. 32	4 August 1890
An Act to assent to certain Provisions in an Agreement between Her Majesty and the German Emperor. (Repealed by Statute Law Revision Act 1953 (2 & 3 Eliz. 2. c. 5))
Statute Law Revision Act 1890	53 & 54 Vict. c. 33	4 August 1890
An Act for further promoting the Revision of the Statute Law by repealing Enactments which are superfluous or have ceased to be in force or have become unnecessary.
Infectious Disease (Prevention) Act 1890 (repealed)	53 & 54 Vict. c. 34	4 August 1890
An Act to prevent the Spread of Infectious Disease. (Repealed for England and Wales by Public Health (London) Act 1891 (54 & 55 Vict. c. 76) and Food and Drugs Act 1938 (1 & 2 Geo. 6. c. 56) and for Northern Ireland by Public Health Act (Northern Ireland) 1967 (c. 36 (N.I.)))
Boiler Explosions Act 1890 (repealed)	53 & 54 Vict. c. 35	4 August 1890
An Act to amend the Boiler Explosions Act, 1882. (Note: Boiler Explosions Act 1882 (45 & 46 Vict. c. 22)) (Repealed for England and Wales and Scotland by Boiler Explosions Acts 1882 and 1890 (Repeals and Modifications) Regulations 1974 (SI 1974/1886) and for Northern Ireland by Boiler Explosions Legislation (Repeals and Modifications) Regulations (Northern Ireland) 1979 (SR 1979/378))
Removal Terms (Scotland) Act 1886, Amendment Act 1890	53 & 54 Vict. c. 36	4 August 1890
An Act to amend the Removal Terms (Scotland) Act, 1886. (Note: Removal Terms (Scotland) Act 1886 (49 & 50 Vict. c. 50))
Foreign Jurisdiction Act 1890	53 & 54 Vict. c. 37	4 August 1890
An Act to consolidate the Foreign Jurisdiction Acts.
Census (Scotland) Act 1890 (repealed)	53 & 54 Vict. c. 38	14 August 1890
An Act for taking the Census of Scotland. (Repealed by Statute Law Revision Act 1908 (8 Edw. 7. c. 49))
Partnership Act 1890	53 & 54 Vict. c. 39	14 August 1890
An Act to declare and amend the Law of Partnership.
Factors (Scotland) Act 1890	53 & 54 Vict. c. 40	14 August 1890
An Act to extend the provisions of the Factors Act, 1889, (Note: Factors Act 1889 (52 & 53 Vict. c. 45)) to Scotland.
London County Council (Money) Act 1890 (repealed)	53 & 54 Vict. c. 41	14 August 1890
An Act to further amend the Acts relating to the raising of Money by the London County Council, and for other purposes. (Repealed by London County Council (Finance Consolidation) Act 1912 (2 & 3 Geo. 5. c. cv))
Reserve Forces Act 1890 (repealed)	53 & 54 Vict. c. 42	14 August 1890
An Act to remove certain doubts which have arisen under the Reserve Forces Act, 1882, (Note: Reserve Forces Act 1882 (45 & 46 Vict. c. 48)) and for other purposes connected therewith. (Repealed by Statute Law Revision Act 1953 (2 & 3 Eliz. 2. c. 5) and Revision of the Army and Air Force Acts (Transitional Provisions) Act 1955 (3 & 4 Eliz. 2. c. 20))
Education of Blind and Deafmute Children (Scotland) Act 1890 (repealed)	53 & 54 Vict. c. 43	14 August 1890
An Act to amend the Law in regard to the Education of Blind and Deaf-mute Children in Scotland. (Repealed by Statute Law Revision Act 1898 (61 & 62 Vict. c. 22), Education (Scotland) Act 1918 (8 & 9 Geo. 5. c. 48) and Education (Scotland) Act 1945 (8 & 9 Geo. 6. c. 37) (Note: Incorrectly cited as "Education (Scotland) Act 1945 (c. 7)" in the Chronological Table of the Statutes.))
Supreme Court of Judicature Act 1890 (repealed)	53 & 54 Vict. c. 44	14 August 1890
An Act to amend the Supreme Court of Judicature Acts. (Repealed by Supreme Court of Judicature (Consolidation) Act 1925 (15 & 16 Geo. 5. c. 49))
Police Act 1890 (repealed)	53 & 54 Vict. c. 45	14 August 1890
An Act to make provision respecting the Pensions, Allowances, and Gratuities of Police Constables in England and Wales, and their Widows and Children, and to make other provisions respecting the Police of England and Wales. (Repealed by Police Act 1964 (c. 48))
Census (Ireland) Act 1890 (repealed)	53 & 54 Vict. c. 46	18 August 1890
An Act for taking the Census of Ireland. (Repealed by Statute Law Revision Act 1908 (8 Edw. 7. c. 49))
Marriage Act 1890 (repealed)	53 & 54 Vict. c. 47	18 August 1890
An Act to amend the Law relating to the Marriage of British Subjects outside the United Kingdom. (Repealed by Foreign Marriage Act 1892 (55 & 56 Vict. c. 23))
Pharmacy Act (Ireland) 1875 Amendment Act 1890 (repealed)	53 & 54 Vict. c. 48	18 August 1890
An Act to amend the Pharmacy Act (Ireland), 1875. (Note: Pharmacy Act (Ireland) 1875 (38 & 39 Vict. c. 57)) (Repealed by Statute Law Revision Act 1908 (8 Edw. 7. c. 49) and Statute Law Revision (Northern Ireland) Act 1954 (c. 35 (N.I.)))
Expiring Laws Continuance Act 1890 (repealed)	53 & 54 Vict. c. 49	18 August 1890
An Act to continue various Expiring Laws. (Repealed by Statute Law Revision Act 1908 (8 Edw. 7. c. 49))
Public Works Loans Act 1890 (repealed)	53 & 54 Vict. c. 50	18 August 1890
An Act to grant Money for the purpose of certain Local Loans, and for other purposes relating to Local Loans. (Repealed by Statute Law Revision Act 1908 (8 Edw. 7. c. 49))
Statute Law Revision (No. 2) Act 1890	53 & 54 Vict. c. 51	18 August 1890
An Act for further promoting the Revision of the Statute Law by repealing enactments which have ceased to be in force or have become unnecessary.
Railways (Ireland) Act 1890 (repealed)	53 & 54 Vict. c. 52	18 August 1890
An Act to provide further facilities for the construction of certain Railways in Ireland. (Repealed by Statute Law Revision Act 1908 (8 Edw. 7. c. 49) and Public Works, etc., Loans Act (Northern Ireland) 1953 (c. 13 (N.I.)))
Bills of Sale Act 1890	53 & 54 Vict. c. 53	18 August 1890
An Act to exempt certain letters of hypothecation from the operation of the Bills of Sale Act, 1882. (Note: Bills of Sale Act (1878) Amendment Act 1882 (45 & 46 Vict. c. 43))
Metropolis Management Act 1862 Amendment Act 1890 (repealed)	53 & 54 Vict. c. 54	18 August 1890
An Act to amend the seventy-eighth section of the Metropolis Management Amendment Act, 1862. (Note: Metropolis Management Amendment Act 1862 (25 & 26 Vict. c. 102)) (Repealed by Local Law (Greater London Council and Inner London Boroughs) Order 1965 (SI 1965/540))
Elections (Scotland) (Corrupt and Illegal Practices) Act 1890 (repealed)	53 & 54 Vict. c. 55	18 August 1890
An Act for the better prevention of Corrupt and Illegal Practices at Elections in Scotland other than Parliamentary elections. (Repealed by Representation of the People Act 1949 (12, 13 & 14 Geo. 6. c. 68))
Customs Consolidation Act 1876 Amendment Act 1890 (repealed)	53 & 54 Vict. c. 56	18 August 1890
An Act to further amend the Customs Consolidation Act, 1876. (Note: Customs Consolidation Act 1876 (39 & 40 Vict. c. 36)) (Repealed by Customs and Excise Act 1952 (15 & 16 Geo. 6 & 1 Eliz. 2. c. 44))
Tenants Compensation Act 1890 (repealed)	53 & 54 Vict. c. 57	18 August 1890
An Act to amend the Law with respect to Compensation due to Tenants on Land under Mortgage. (Repealed by Allotments Act 1922 (12 & 13 Geo. 5. c. 51))
Parliamentary Registration Expenses (Ireland) Act 1890 (repealed)	53 & 54 Vict. c. 58	18 August 1890
An Act to make better provision for the payment of Clerks of Unions and Collectors of Poor Rates for services in carrying into effect the Acts relating to the Registration of Parliamentary Voters in Ireland. (Repealed by Representation of the People Act 1918 (7 & 8 Geo. 5. c. 64))
Public Health Acts Amendment Act 1890	53 & 54 Vict. c. 59	18 August 1890
An Act to amend the Public Health Acts.
Local Taxation (Customs and Excise) Act 1890 (repealed)	53 & 54 Vict. c. 60	18 August 1890
An Act for the Distribution and Application of certain Duties of Customs and Excise; and for other purposes connected therewith. (Repealed for England and Wales and Scotland by Local Government Act 1929 (19 & 20 Geo. 5. c. 17) and Local Government (Scotland) Act 1929 (19 & 20 Geo. 5. c. 25) and for Northern Ireland by Statute Law Revision (Northern Ireland) Act 1954 (c. 35 (N.I.)))
Census (England and Wales) Act 1890 (repealed)	53 & 54 Vict. c. 61	18 August 1890
An Act for taking the Census of England and Wales. (Repealed by Statute Law Revision Act 1908 (8 Edw. 7. c. 49))
Companies (Memorandum of Association) Act 1890 (repealed)	53 & 54 Vict. c. 62	18 August 1890
An Act to give further Powers to Companies with respect to certain Instruments under which they may be constituted or regulated. (Repealed by Companies (Consolidation) Act 1908 (8 Edw. 7. c. 69))
Companies (Winding up) Act 1890 (repealed)	53 & 54 Vict. c. 63	18 August 1890
An Act to amend the Law relating to the Winding up of Companies in England and Wales. (Repealed by Companies (Consolidation) Act 1908 (8 Edw. 7. c. 69))
Directors Liability Act 1890 (repealed)	53 & 54 Vict. c. 64	18 August 1890
An Act to amend the Law relating to the Liability of Directors and others for Statements in Prospectuses and other Documents soliciting applications for Shares or Debentures. (Repealed by Companies (Consolidation) Act 1908 (8 Edw. 7. c. 69))
Allotments Act 1890 (repealed)	53 & 54 Vict. c. 65	18 August 1890
An Act to provide for an Appeal from a Sanitary Authority failing to carry into effect the Allotments Act, 1887. (Note: Allotments Act 1887 (50 & 51 Vict. c. 48)) (Repealed by Small Holdings and Allotments Act 1908 (8 Edw. 7. c. 36))
Metropolis Management Amendment Act 1890 (repealed)	53 & 54 Vict. c. 66	18 August 1890
An Act to amend the Metropolis Management Acts. (Repealed by Local Law (Greater London Council and Inner London Boroughs) Order 1965 (SI 1965/540))
Police (Scotland) Act 1890 (repealed)	53 & 54 Vict. c. 67	18 August 1890
An Act to make provision respecting the Pensions, Allowances, and Gratuities of Police Constables in Scotland, and their Widows and Children, and to make other provisions respecting the Police of Scotland. (Repealed by Police (Scotland) Act 1956 (4 & 5 Eliz. 2. c. 26))
Public Libraries Acts Amendment Act 1890 (repealed)	53 & 54 Vict. c. 68	18 August 1890
An Act to amend the Public Libraries (England) Acts. (Repealed by Public Libraries Act 1892 (55 & 56 Vict. c. 53))
Settled Land Act 1890	53 & 54 Vict. c. 69	18 August 1890
An Act to amend the Settled Land Acts, 1882 to 1889. (Repealed for England and Wales by Settled Land Act 1925 (15 & 16 Geo. 5. c. 18) and for Scotland by Abolition of Feudal Tenure etc. (Scotland) Act 2000 (asp 5))
Housing of the Working Classes Act 1890	53 & 54 Vict. c. 70	18 August 1890
An Act to consolidate and amend the Acts relating to Artizans and Labourers Dwellings and the Housing of the Working Classes. (Repealed for England and Wales by Housing Act 1925 (15 & 16 Geo. 5. c. 14) and Settled Land Act 1925 (15 & 16 Geo. 5. c. 18) and for Scotland by Housing (Scotland) Act 1925 (15 & 16 Geo. 5. c. 15))
Bankruptcy Act 1890 (repealed)	53 & 54 Vict. c. 71	18 August 1890
An Act to amend the Law of Bankruptcy. (Repealed by Statute Law (Repeals) Act 1989 (c. 43))
Appropriation Act 1890 (repealed)	53 & 54 Vict. c. 72	18 August 1890
An Act to apply a sum out of the Consolidated Fund to the service of the year ending on the thirty-first day of March one thousand eight hundred and ninety-one and to appropriate the Supplies granted in this Session of Parliament. (Repealed by Statute Law Revision Act 1908 (8 Edw. 7. c. 49))

=== Local acts ===
Short title	Citation	Royal assent
Long title
St. John's Chapel Deritend Act 1890 (repealed)	53 & 54 Vict. c. i	2 May 1890
An Act to alter the mode of appointment of the Chaplain or Minister of the ancient Chapel of Saint John Deritend in the Diocese of Worcester and to provide for the constitution of part of the Hamlet of Saint John Deritend into a separate Parish for ecclesiastical purposes; and to make other con sequential arrangements. (Repealed by Birmingham Corporation Act 1935 (25 & 26 Geo. 5. c. cxxii))
Henry Bath and Son's (Delivery Warrants) Act 1890	53 & 54 Vict. c. ii	2 May 1890
An Act to enable Messieurs Henry Bath and Son to issue transferable Certificates and Warrants for the delivery of Goods; and for other purposes.
Columbia Market Railways (Abandonment) Act 1890 (repealed)	53 & 54 Vict. c. iii	2 May 1890
An Act for the Abandonment of the Railways and New Street authorised by the Columbia Market Act, 1885. (Note: Columbia Market Act 1885 (48 & 49 Vict. c. lxxiv)) (Repealed by Statute Law (Repeals) Act 2013 (c. 2))
Edinburgh Municipal and Police Extension Act 1890 (repealed)	53 & 54 Vict. c. iv	2 May 1890
An Act for enabling the purchase of the Braid Hills by the Lord Provost, Magistrates and Council of the City of Edinburgh to be completed; for extending the Municipal and Police Boundaries of the City, including the Royal Burgh; for prohibiting or regulating games on Bruntsfield Links; and for other purposes. (Repealed by Edinburgh Corporation Order Confirmation Act 1933 (24 & 25 Geo. 5. c. v))
Holsworthy and Bude Railway Act 1890 (repealed)	53 & 54 Vict. c. v	2 May 1890
An Act to extend the time for the completion of the authorised Railway of the Holsworthy and Bude Railway Company and for other purposes. (Repealed by Holsworthy and Bude Railway (Abandonment) Act 1892 (55 & 56 Vict. c. xx))
Clayton Allerton and Thornton Gas Act 1890	53 & 54 Vict. c. vi	2 May 1890
An Act to enable the Clayton Allerton and Thornton Gas Company to extend their works; to raise further Capital; and for other purposes.
Clyde Lighthouses Act 1890 (repealed)	53 & 54 Vict. c. vii	2 May 1890
An Act to extend the time for the completion of the Works authorised by the Clyde Lighthouses Act, 1880, (Note: Clyde Lighthouses Act 1880 (43 & 44 Vict. c. cxxxvii)) and the purchase of Lands therefor. (Repealed by Clyde Lighthouses Consolidation Order Confirmation Act 1940 (3 & 4 Geo. 6. c. xlii))
Royal Naval School (New Cross) Disused Chapel Site Act 1890 (repealed)	53 & 54 Vict. c. viii	2 May 1890
An Act for freeing a Chapel formerly belonging to the Royal Naval School at New Cross and the Site thereof from Ecclesiastical uses purposes and disabilities and for authorising the demolition of the said Chapel; and for other purposes. (Repealed by Statute Law (Repeals) Act 2008 (c. 12))
South London Polytechnic Institutes (Borough Road Site) Act 1890 (repealed)	53 & 54 Vict. c. ix	2 May 1890
An Act to authorize the purchase of a Site in Southwark for the South London Polytechnic Institutes. (Repealed by Statute Law (Repeals) Act 2013 (c. 2))
Hartlepool Gas and Water Act 1890 (repealed)	53 & 54 Vict. c. x	22 May 1890
An Act to enable the Hartlepool Gas and Water Company to purchase additional lands and to erect Gasworks thereon and for other purposes. (Repealed by Hartlepools Water (Consolidation, etc.) Order 1986 (SI 1986/401))
Cart Navigation Act 1890 (repealed)	53 & 54 Vict. c. xi	22 May 1890
An Act to authorise the Trustees of the Cart Navigation to borrow additional money and to levy additional rates and for other purposes. (Repealed by Paisley Corporation (Cart Navigation) Order Confirmation Act 1938 (2 & 3 Geo. 6. c. ii))
Selby and Mid-Yorkshire Union Railway (Abandonment) Act 1890 (repealed)	53 & 54 Vict. c. xii	22 May 1890
An Act for the abandonment of the Railways authorised by the Church Fenton, Cawood and Wistow Railway Act, 1879, (Note: Church Fenton, Cawood, and Wistow Railway Act 1879 (42 & 43 Vict. c. cxxviii)) and the Selby and Mid-Yorkshire Union Railway Act, 1883. (Note: Selby and Mid-Yorkshire Union Railway Act 1883 (46 & 47 Vict. c. cxvi)) (Repealed by Statute Law (Repeals) Act 2013 (c. 2))
Great Eastern, Hunstanton and West Norfolk Railway Companies Act 1890	53 & 54 Vict. c. xiii	22 May 1890
An Act for the sale and transfer to the Great Eastern Railway Company of the Undertaking of the Hunstanton and West Norfolk Railway Company and for other purposes.
Falkirk Corporation Act 1890	53 & 54 Vict. c. xiv	22 May 1890
An Act for the transference of the Property of the Feuars of Falkirk to the Magistrates and Council of the Burgh of Falkirk; for extending the Municipal and Police Boundaries of the Burgh; for borrowing further money for Drainage; and for other purposes.
Worcester and Broom Railway (Extension of Time) Act 1890 (repealed)	53 & 54 Vict. c. xv	22 May 1890
An Act to extend the time for the compulsory purchase of lands and for completing the Worcester and Broom Railway. (Repealed by Worcester and Broom Railway (Abandonment) Act 1894 (57 & 58 Vict. c. xi))
Brentford and District Tramways (Abandonment) Act 1890	53 & 54 Vict. c. xvi	22 May 1890
An Act for the Abandonment of the Brentford and District Tramways and for authorising the release of the Tramway Deposit Fund remaining deposited as security for the completion thereof.
Baildon Local Board Water Act 1890	53 & 54 Vict. c. xvii	22 May 1890
An Act to authorise the Local Board for the district of Baildon to construct Works for obtaining a further supply of Water and to borrow further money and for other purposes.
Birkenhead Corporation (Gas and Water) Act 1890	53 & 54 Vict. c. xviii	22 May 1890
An Act to amend the Birkenhead Corporation (Gas and Water) Act 1881 (Note: Birkenhead Corporation (Gas and Water) Act 1881 (44 & 45 Vict. c. clii)) and to make further provisions as to the supply of Gas and Water by the Corporation of Birkenhead; and for other purposes.
Cathcart District Railway Act 1890	53 & 54 Vict. c. xix	22 May 1890
An Act to enable the Cathcart District Railway Company to raise further money and to create and issue debenture stock and the Caledonian Railway Company to subscribe or to take and hold such stock or to advance to the Company by way of loan and for other purposes.
Derby Gas Act 1890	53 & 54 Vict. c. xx	22 May 1890
An Act for the granting of further powers to the Derby Gaslight and Coke Company.
Bray and Enniskerry Railway Act 1890	53 & 54 Vict. c. xxi	22 May 1890
An Act to revive the powers and extend the period for the Compulsory Purchase of Lands and to extend the period for the Completion of the Railway authorised by the Bray and Enniskerry Light Railway Act 1886 (Note: Bray and Enniskerry Light Railway Act 1886 (49 & 50 Vict. c. xii)) and to confer additional powers on the Company with reference to their Capital and Railway and for other purposes.
Port Glasgow Harbour Act 1890 (repealed)	53 & 54 Vict. c. xxii	22 May 1890
An Act for enabling the Trustees of Port Glasgow Harbour to convert their Mortgage Debt into Debenture Stock; for altering the Constitution of the Trust; and for other purposes. (Repealed by Port Glasgow Burgh and Harbour Order Confirmation Act 1939 (2 & 3 Geo. 6. c. lxix))
Belfast and Northern Counties Railways Act 1890	53 & 54 Vict. c. xxiii	22 May 1890
An Act for conferring further Powers on the Belfast and Northern Counties Railway Company and for amalgamating with their Undertaking the Undertaking of the Carrickfergus and Larne Railway Company; and for other purposes.
London Tramways Company Act 1890	53 & 54 Vict. c. xxiv	22 May 1890
An Act to authorise the London Tramways Company (Limited) to use mechanical power on their Tramways and for other purposes.
Wrexham and Ellesmere Railway (Extension of Time) Act 1890	53 & 54 Vict. c. xxv	22 May 1890
An Act to extend the time for the purchase of Lands for and for the completion of the Wrexham and Ellesmere Railway and for other purposes.
Llangammarch and Neath and Brecon Junction Railway (Abandonment) Act 1890 (repealed)	53 & 54 Vict. c. xxvi	22 May 1890
An Act for the Abandonment of the Llangammarch and Neath and Brecon Junction Railway. (Repealed by Statute Law (Repeals) Act 2013 (c. 2))
Canterbury Gas and Water Act 1890	53 & 54 Vict. c. xxvii	22 May 1890
An Act to enable the Canterbury Gas and Water Company to acquire further land to erect additional gasworks and to raise further capital for their Gas and Water undertakings and for other purposes.
Tyne Improvement Act 1890	53 & 54 Vict. c. xxviii	22 May 1890
An Act for consolidating the separate Funds of the Tyne Improvement Commissioners; and for amending the provisions of the Tyne Improvement Commission Act 1875 (Note: Tyne Improvement Commission Act 1875 (38 & 39 Vict. c. xxiii)) relating to the election of Commissioners and Auditor of the Tyne Improvement Acts relating to the levying and Collection of Rates and Dues; and for empowering the Commissioners to establish a Superannuation Fund; and for other purposes.
Gravesend Gas Act 1890	53 & 54 Vict. c. xxix	22 May 1890
An Act to confer further powers upon the Gravesend and Milton Gaslight Company to extend their limits of supply and to enable them to raise additional capital and for other purposes.
Thames Valley Drainage Act 1890 (repealed)	53 & 54 Vict. c. xxx	22 May 1890
An Act to amend the Thames Valley Drainage Acts and for other purposes. (Repealed by Thames Conservancy Act 1950 (14 Geo. 6. c. l))
Guiseley, Yeadon and Rawdon Railway Act 1890	53 & 54 Vict. c. xxxi	22 May 1890
An Act to Revive and Extend the Powers of the Guiseley Yeadon and Rawdon Railway Company for the Purchase of Land and the Completion of their Railway and for other purposes.
Luton Gas Act 1890	53 & 54 Vict. c. xxxii	22 May 1890
An Act to authorize the Luton Gas Company to raise additional Capital; and for other purposes.
Great Southern and Western Railway Act 1890	53 & 54 Vict. c. xxxiii	22 May 1890
An Act for enabling the Great Southern and Western Railway Company to execute certain Works; to acquire additional Lands; to purchase or lease a portion of the Railway of the Dublin, Wicklow and Wexford Railway Company; to enter into working agreements with that Company and with the Mitchelstown and Fermoy Light Railway Company to purchase a portion of the Deep Water Quay at Queenstown; to raise further Capital; and for other purposes.
Burnley, Clitheroe and Sabden Railway (Abandonment) Act 1890 (repealed)	53 & 54 Vict. c. xxxiv	22 May 1890
An Act for the Abandonment of the Burnley Clitheroe and Sabden Railway. (Repealed by Statute Law (Repeals) Act 2013 (c. 2))
Felixstowe and Bawdsey Ferry Railway (Extension of Time) Act 1890 (repealed)	53 & 54 Vict. c. xxxv	22 May 1890
An Act to extend the time for the purchase of Lands for and for the completion of the Felixstowe and Bawdsey Ferry Railway and for other purposes. (Repealed by Felixstowe and Bawdsey Ferry Railway (Abandonment) Act 1892 (55 & 56 Vict. c. xvi))
Leicester Corporation Waterworks Act 1890	53 & 54 Vict. c. xxxvi	22 May 1890
An Act to extend the powers of the Mayor Aldermen and Burgesses of the County Borough of Leicester with respect to their supply of Water; and for other purposes.
Pier and Harbour Orders Confirmation (No. 1) Act 1890	53 & 54 Vict. c. xxxvii	9 June 1890
An Act to confirm certain Provisional Orders made by the Board of Trade under the General Pier and Harbour Act, 1861, (Note: General Pier and Harbour Act 1861 (24 & 25 Vict. c. 45)) relating to Hastings, Helmsdale, Mullion, Rhyl (New), and Yarmouth (Great).
	Hastings Pier Order 1890 Order for amending the Hastings Pier Act 1867 (Note: Hastings Pier Act 1867 (30 & 31 Vict. c. clxxxvii)) and for the Construction Maintenance and Regulation of Additions to the Pier and Works at Hastings in the County of Sussex.	
	Helmsdale Harbour Order 1890 Order for the construction of Works at the Harbour of Helmsdale, in the county of Sutherland, and for the Maintenance and Regulation of the Harbour.	
	Mullion Harbour and Piers Order 1890 Order for the Construction Maintenance and Regulation of a Harbour Piers and Works at Mullion in the County of Cornwall.	
	Rhyl (New) Promenade Pier and Landing-Stage Order 1890 Order for the Construction Maintenance and Regulation of a Pier and Works at Rhyl (New) in the Parishes of Rhuddlan and Dyserth in the County of Flint.	
	Great Yarmouth Fish Wharf Order 1890 Order for the construction and maintenance of a Quay Wall fronting the Fish Wharf in the Borough of Great Yarmouth, and for the Amendment of The Great Yarmouth Fish Wharves Act, 1866. (Note: Great Yarmouth Fish Wharves Act 1866 (29 & 30 Vict. c. cclxiii))	
Forth Bridge Railway Act 1890	53 & 54 Vict. c. xxxviii	9 June 1890
An Act to enable the Forth Bridge Railway Company to raise additional Capital and for other purposes.
London, Brighton and South Coast Railway (Agreements Confirmation) Act 1890	53 & 54 Vict. c. xxxix	9 June 1890
An Act to confirm Modifications made by the Award of an Umpire in certain Agreements between the London Brighton and South Coast and South Eastern Railway Companies and the Extension of those Agreements.
Cornwall Minerals Railway Act 1890	53 & 54 Vict. c. xl	9 June 1890
An Act to enable the Cornwall Minerals Railway Company to make a new Railway and for other purposes.
East Usk Railway Act 1890	53 & 54 Vict. c. xli	9 June 1890
An Act to revive the powers for the compulsory purchase of lands for and to extend the time limited for the completion of the railways authorised by the East Usk Railway Act 1885 (Note: East Usk Railway Act 1885 (48 & 49 Vict. c. clxxxvii)) and for other purposes.
Ribble Navigation Act 1890 (repealed)	53 & 54 Vict. c. xlii	9 June 1890
An Act to enable the Mayor Aldermen and Burgesses of the Borough of Preston to give effect to certain of the recommendations of the Interim Report of the Ribble Navigation Commission and to borrow Additional Moneys for the purposes of the Ribble Navigation and Preston Dock Undertaking and for other purposes. (Repealed by Preston Borough Council Act 1981 (c. xxii))
Local Government Board's Provisional Orders Confirmation (Highways) Act 1890	53 & 54 Vict. c. xliii	4 July 1890
An Act to confirm certain Provisional Orders of the Local Government Board under the Highways and Locomotives (Amendment) Act, 1878, (Note: Highways and Locomotives (Amendment) Act 1878 (41 & 42 Vict. c. 77)) relating to the Counties of Gloucester and Wilts.
	Gloucester Order 1890 Provisional Order as to certain Disturnpiked Roads.	
	Wilts Order 1890 Provisional Order as to a Disturnpiked Road.	
Local Government Board's Provisional Orders Confirmation Act 1890	53 & 54 Vict. c. xliv	4 July 1890
An Act to confirm certain Provisional Orders of the Local Government Board relating to the Urban Sanitary Districts of Brighouse, Bromley, Burnley, Dover, Folkestone, Mountain Ash, and Trowbridge.
	Brighouse Order 1890 Provisional Order for altering a Confirming Act. (Note: Local Government Supplemental Act 1865 (28 & 29 Vict. c. 24))	
	Bromley Order 1890 Provisional Order to enable the Sanitary Authority for the Urban Sanitary District of Bromley to put in force the Compulsory Clauses of the Lands Clauses Acts.	
	Burnley Order 1890 Provisional Order to enable the Urban Sanitary Authority for the Borough of Burnley to put in force the Compulsory Clauses of the Lands Clauses Acts.	
	Dover Order 1890 Provisional Order to enable the Urban Sanitary Authority for the Borough of Dover to put in force the Compulsory Clauses of the Lands Clauses Acts.	
	Folkestone Order 1890 Provisional Order to enable the Sanitary Authority for the Urban Sanitary District of Folkestone to put in force the Compulsory Clauses of the Lands Clauses Acts.	
	Mountain Ash Order 1890 Provisional Order to enable the Sanitary Authority for the Urban Sanitary District of Mountain Ash to put in force the Compulsory Clauses of the Lands Clauses Acts.	
	Trowbridge Order 1890 Provisional Order for repealing a Local Act. (Note: Trowbridge Improvement Act 1799 (39 Geo. 3. c. lxi))	
Falmouth Gas Act 1890	53 & 54 Vict. c. xlv	4 July 1890
An Act for incorporating and conferring powers upon the Falmouth Gas Company.
North Metropolitan Tramways Act 1890	53 & 54 Vict. c. xlvi	4 July 1890
An Act to authorise the use of mechanical power upon the Undertaking of the North Metropolitan Tramways Company and for other purposes.
Broxborne and Hoddesdon Open Spaces and Recreation Grounds Act 1890	53 & 54 Vict. c. xlvii	4 July 1890
An Act to provide Open Spaces and Recreation Grounds in the Parishes of Broxborne and Hoddesdon in the county of Hertford and to declare and define the rights of way through the Broxbornebury Estate; and for other purposes.
Kenmare Junction Railway (Abandonment) Act 1890 (repealed)	53 & 54 Vict. c. xlviii	4 July 1890
An Act for the Abandonment of the Kenmare Junction Railway. (Repealed by Statute Law (Repeals) Act 2013 (c. 2))
Cadogan and Hans Place Estate (Limited) Act 1890	53 & 54 Vict. c. xlix	4 July 1890
An Act to facilitate the winding up of the Cadogan and Hans Place Estate Limited and the distribution of the assets thereof.
Logan and Company's (Delivery Warrants) Act 1890	53 & 54 Vict. c. l	4 July 1890
An Act to enable Logan and Company of Birkenhead to issue Transferable Certificates and Warrants for the Delivery of Goods and for other purposes.
Richardson and Company's (Delivery Warrants) Act 1890	53 & 54 Vict. c. li	4 July 1890
An Act to enable Richardson and Company of Swansea to issue transferable Certificates and Warrants for the Delivery of Goods and for other purposes.
Croydon Improvement Act 1890 (repealed)	53 & 54 Vict. c. lii	4 July 1890
An Act to authorise certain Improvements in the County Borough of Croydon and for other purposes. (Repealed by Croydon Corporation Act 1960 (8 & 9 Eliz. 2 c. xl))
South Western Railway Act 1890	53 & 54 Vict. c. liii	4 July 1890
An Act for authorising the London and South Western Railway Company to construct additional Works to purchase additional Lands and to abandon certain of their authorised Works to extend and revive the periods limited for the purchase of Lands for and for the completion of certain authorised Works of the Company to extend the Time for the sale of superfluous Lands of the Company to empower the Company to consolidate their Debenture Stocks and to make other provision with respect to the Capital of and to confer further powers upon the Company to empower the Company and the Midland Railway Company to widen the Somerset and Dorset Railway; and for other purposes.
Derby Corporation Act 1890	53 & 54 Vict. c. liv	4 July 1890
An Act to empower the Corporation of Derby to make additional Waterworks and for other purposes.
Huddersfield Tramways and Improvement Act 1890 (repealed)	53 & 54 Vict. c. lv	4 July 1890
An Act to enable the Mayor Aldermen and Burgesses of the County borough of Huddersfield to construct additional Tramways and Street and Road Improvements and to make further Provision for the good government of the Borough and for other purposes. (Repealed by West Yorkshire Act 1980 (c. xiv))
Hull, Barnsley and West Riding Junction Railway and Dock Act 1890	53 & 54 Vict. c. lvi	4 July 1890
An Act for extending and reviving the powers of the Hull Barnsley and West Riding Junction Railway and Dock Company for the purchase of lands for and for the construction of certain of their authorised works for the abandonment of one of their authorised railways and for conferring further powers upon the Company and amending the Acts relating to them.
Barry Dock and Railways Act 1890	53 & 54 Vict. c. lvii	4 July 1890
An Act to enable the Barry Dock and Railways Company to construct new Works and to purchase Additional Lands and for other purposes.
Glasgow Court Houses Act 1890	53 & 54 Vict. c. lviii	4 July 1890
An Act to authorise the Glasgow Court Houses Commissioners to acquire additional land and buildings for enlarging and improving the Sheriff and Justice of Peace Court Houses, in the City of Glasgow, and to borrow money; and for other purposes.
Wirral Railway Act 1890	53 & 54 Vict. c. lix	4 July 1890
An Act to extend the time for the purchase of Lands and for the completion of certain portions of the Undertaking of the Wirral Railway Company by the Manchester Sheffield and Lincolnshire and Wrexham Mold and Connah's Quay Railway Companies and for other purposes.
Highland Railway (Further Powers) Act 1890	53 & 54 Vict. c. lx	4 July 1890
An Act to confer further powers on the Highland Railway Company, and for other purposes.
Highland Railway (New Lines) Act 1890	53 & 54 Vict. c. lxi	4 July 1890
An Act to authorise the Highland Railway Company to construct new lines of Railways; and for other purposes.
Brighton West Pier Act 1890	53 & 54 Vict. c. lxii	4 July 1890
An Act to incorporate a Company to purchase and acquire the Undertaking of the Brighton West Pier Company to authorise the widening and extension of the Brighton West Pier and for other purposes.
Accrington Corporation (Consolidation of Loans) Act 1890 (repealed)	53 & 54 Vict. c. lxiii	4 July 1890
An Act to authorise the Mayor Aldermen and Burgesses of the Borough of Accrington to create and issue Corporation Stock and to make further provision for the government of the Borough and for other purposes. (Repealed by County of Lancashire Act 1984 (c. xxi))
Liverpool Hydraulic Power Act 1890	53 & 54 Vict. c. lxiv	4 July 1890
An Act for conferring further powers on the Liverpool Hydraulic Power Company and for other purposes.
Mid-Sussex Water Act 1890	53 & 54 Vict. c. lxv	4 July 1890
An Act for dissolving the Mid-Sussex Water Company Limited and re-incorporating the Members thereof with others and for enabling them to construct and maintain additional Waterworks and supply Water and for other purposes.
Ipswich Tramways Act 1890	53 & 54 Vict. c. lxvi	4 July 1890
An Act for conferring further powers on the Ipswich Tramways Company.
Borough of Portsmouth Waterworks Act 1890 (repealed)	53 & 54 Vict. c. lxvii	4 July 1890
An Act to extend the time for the construction of certain works authorised by the Borough of Portsmouth Waterworks Act 1883. (Note: Borough of Portsmouth Waterworks Act 1883 (46 & 47 Vict. c. clix)) (Repealed by Portsmouth Water Order 1964 (SI 1964/790))
Pontypool Gas and Water Act 1890	53 & 54 Vict. c. lxviii	4 July 1890
An Act to extend the limits of Water Supply of the Pontypool Gas and Water Company to enable them to con struct additional Waterworks and to raise further Capital and for other purposes.
Bury Corporation Gas Act 1890 (repealed)	53 & 54 Vict. c. lxix	4 July 1890
An Act to authorise the Corporation of Bury to construct a connecting Railway between their Gasworks and the Lancashire and Yorkshire Railway and for other purposes. (Repealed by Bury Corporation Act 1909 (9 Edw. 7. c. clix))
North Wales Narrow Gauge Railways Act 1890	53 & 54 Vict. c. lxx	4 July 1890
An Act to extend the time for the completion of the Railways authorised by the North Wales Narrow Gauge Railways (Extensions) Act 1885; (Note: North Wales Narrow Gauge Railways (Extensions, &c.) Act 1885 (48 & 49 Vict. c. cxxxiv)) and for other purposes.
Seacombe, Hoylake and Deeside Railway Act 1890	53 & 54 Vict. c. lxxi	4 July 1890
An Act to renew and extend the time for the completion of certain authorised Railways of the Seacombe Hoylake and Deeside Railway Company; and for other purposes.
North British Railway Act 1890	53 & 54 Vict. c. lxxii	4 July 1890
An Act to authorise the North British Railway Company to construct a Loop Line of Railway; to join the Forth Bridge Railway; to subscribe to the Undertaking of the West Highland Railway Company; and for other purposes.
Isle of Wight Central Railway Act 1890	53 & 54 Vict. c. lxxiii	4 July 1890
An Act to confer further powers on the Isle of Wight Central Railway Company; and for other purposes.
Manchester Ship Canal (Tidal Openings, &c.) Act 1890	53 & 54 Vict. c. lxxiv	4 July 1890
An Act to alter certain works authorised by the Manchester Ship Canal Act 1885; (Note: Manchester Ship Canal Act 1885 (48 & 49 Vict. c. clxxxviii)) and for other purposes.
Milford Docks Act 1890 (repealed)	53 & 54 Vict. c. lxxv	4 July 1890
An Act to confer further powers upon the Milford Docks Company and for other purposes. (Repealed by Milford Docks Act 1953 (1 & 2 Eliz. 2. c. x))
Midland Great Western and Great Northern and Western of Ireland Railways (Amalgamation) Act 1890 (repealed)	53 & 54 Vict. c. lxxvi	4 July 1890
An Act to amalgamate the Midland Great Western Railway of Ireland Company with the Great Northern and Western (of Ireland) Railway Company; to acquire additional Land; and for other purposes. (Repealed by Statute Law (Repeals) Act 2013 (c. 2))
Metropolitan Police Provisional Order Confirmation Act 1890 (repealed)	53 & 54 Vict. c. lxxvii	4 July 1890
An Act to confirm a Provisional Order made by one of Her Majesty's Principal Secretaries of State under the Metropolitan Police Act, 1886, (Note: Metropolitan Police Act 1886 (49 & 50 Vict. c. 22)) relating to Lands in the Parishes of St. George Hanover Square and Fulham. (Repealed by Statute Law (Repeals) Act 2008 (c. 12))
Commons Regulation (Cleeve) Provisional Order Confirmation Act 1890	53 & 54 Vict. c. lxxviii	4 July 1890
An Act to confirm a Provisional Order for the Regulation of Cleeve Hill Common, situate in the parish of Bishop's Cleeve, in the county of Gloucester, in pursuance of a report from the Board of Agriculture.
	Cleeve Hill Common (Gloucestershire) Order 1890 Provisional Order for the Regulation of Cleeve Hill Common, Gloucestershire.	
Kew and Petersham Vicarage Act 1890	53 & 54 Vict. c. lxxix	4 July 1890
An Act to provide for the division of the Vicarage of Kew and Petersham into two distinct Vicarages.
Local Government Board's Provisional Order Confirmation (Port) Act 1890	53 & 54 Vict. c. lxxx	4 July 1890
An Act to confirm an Order of the Local Government Board under the provisions of the Public Health Act, 1875, (Note: Public Health Act 1875 (38 & 39 Vict. c. 55)) as amended by the Public Health (Ships, &c.) Act, 1885, (Note: Public Health (Ships, &c.) Act 1885 (48 & 49 Vict. c 35)) relating to the Port of Colchester (Maldon Division).
	Port of Colchester (Maldon Division) Order 1890 Port of Colchester (Maldon Division) Port Sanitary Authority.	
Local Government Board's Provisional Orders Confirmation (No. 2) Act 1890	53 & 54 Vict. c. lxxxi	4 July 1890
An Act to confirm certain Provisional Orders of the Local Government Board relating to the Urban Sanitary Districts of Cambridge, Cheadle and Gatley, Portsmouth, and Ramsbottom, and to the Rural Sanitary Districts of the Belper, Bishop Stortford, Tynemouth, and Watford Unions.
	Belper Union Order 1890 Provisional Order to enable the Sanitary Authority for the Rural Sanitary District of the Belper Union to put in force the Compulsory Clauses of the Lands Clauses Acts.	
	Bishop Stortford Union Order 1890 Provisional Order to enable the Sanitary Authority for the Rural Sanitary District of the Bishop Stortford Union to put in force the Compulsory Clauses of the Lands Clauses Acts.	
	Cambridge Order 1890 Provisional Order to enable the Urban Sanitary Authority for the Borough of Cambridge to put in force the Compulsory Clauses of the Lands Clauses Acts.	
	Cheadle and Gatley Order 1890 Provisional Order to enable the Sanitary Authority for the Urban Sanitary District of Cheadle and Gatley to put in force the Compulsory Clauses of the Lands Clauses Acts.	
	Portsmouth Order (1) 1890 Provisional Order to enable the Urban Sanitary Authority for the Borough of Portsmouth to put in force the Compulsory Clauses of the Lands Clauses Acts.	
	Ramsbottom Order 1890 Provisional Order to enable the Sanitary Authority for the Urban Sanitary District of Ramsbottom to put in force the Compulsory Clauses of the Lands Clauses Acts.	
	Tynemouth Union Order 1890 Provisional Order to enable the Sanitary Authority for the Rural Sanitary District of the Tynemouth Union to put in force the Compulsory Clauses of the Lands Clauses Acts.	
	Watford Union Order 1890 Provisional Order to enable the Sanitary Authority for the Rural Sanitary District of the Watford Union to put in force the Compulsory Clauses of the Lands Clauses Acts.	
Local Government Board's Provisional Orders Confirmation (No. 3) Act 1890	53 & 54 Vict. c. lxxxii	4 July 1890
An Act to confirm certain Provisional Orders of the Local Government Board relating to the Urban Sanitary Districts of Batley, Croydon, Halifax, Milford, Ogmore and Garw, and Portsmouth.
	Batley Order 1890 Provisional Order for altering certain Local Acts. (Note: Batley Corporation Waterworks Act 1871 (34 & 35 Vict. c. xl)) (Note: Batley Corporation Waterworks Act 1878 (41 & 42 Vict. c. xxvii))	
	Croydon Order 1890 Provisional Order for altering the Croydon Corporation Act, 1884. (Note: Croydon Corporation Act 1884 (47 & 48 Vict. c. cxli))	
	Halifax Order 1890 Provisional Order for partially repealing and altering certain Local Acts. (Note: Halifax Park and Improvement Act 1858 (21 & 22 Vict. c. xci)) (Note: Halifax Improvement Act 1862 (25 & 26 Vict. c. xli))	
	Milford Order 1890 Provisional Order for altering the Milford Improvement Acts, 1857 (Note: Milford Improvement Act 1857 (20 & 21 Vict. c. lxxiv)) and 1869. (Note: Milford Improvement Act 1869 (32 & 33 Vict. c. xcvii))	
	Ogmore and Garw Order 1890 Provisional Order for altering a Confirming Act. (Note: Local Government Board's Provisional Orders Confirmation (No. 8) Act 1887 (50 & 51 Vict. c. cxii))	
	Portsmouth Order (2) 1890 Provisional Order for altering the Portsmouth Corporation Act, 1883. (Note: Portsmouth Corporation Act 1883 (46 & 47 Vict. c. ccxi))	
Local Government Board's Provisional Orders Confirmation (No. 4) Act 1890	53 & 54 Vict. c. lxxxiii	4 July 1890
An Act to confirm certain Provisional Orders of the Local Government Board relating to the Urban Sanitary Districts of Manchester and Stockport.
	Manchester Order 1890 Provisional Order to enable the Urban Sanitary Authority for the City of Manchester to put in force the Compulsory Clauses of the Lands Clauses Acts.	
	Stockport Order 1890 Provisional Order to enable the Urban Sanitary Authority for the Borough of Stockport to put in force the Compulsory Clauses of the Lands Clauses Acts.	
Local Government Board's Provisional Orders Confirmation (No. 5) Act 1890	53 & 54 Vict. c. lxxxiv	4 July 1890
An Act to confirm certain Provisional Orders of the Local Government Board relating to the Urban Sanitary Districts of Bolton, Colne and Marsden, Leicester, Neath, Rotherham, Soothill Nether, Southampton, and Sutton (Surrey).
	Bolton Order 1890 Provisional Order for altering certain Local Acts.	
	Colne and Marsden Order 1890 Provisional Order for altering certain Local Acts.	
	Leicester Order 1890 Provisional Order for altering the Leicester Corporation Act, 1884. (Note: Leicester Corporation Act 1884 (47 & 48 Vict. c. xxxii))	
	Neath Order 1890 Provisional Order to enable the Urban Sanitary Authority for the Borough of Neath to put in force the Compulsory Clauses of the Lands Clauses Acts.	
	Rotherham Order 1890 Provisional Order for altering the Rotherham Corporation Act, 1882. (Note: Rotherham Corporation Act 1882 (45 & 46 Vict. c. ccxxxvii))	
	Soothill Nether Order 1890 Provisional Order to enable the Sanitary Authority for the Urban Sanitary District of Soothill Nether to put in force the Compulsory Clauses of the Lands Clauses Acts.	
	Southampton Order 1890 Provisional Order to enable the Urban Sanitary Authority for the Borough of Southampton to put in force the Compulsory Clauses of the Lands Clauses Acts.	
	Sutton (Surrey) Order 1890 Provisional Order to enable the Urban Sanitary Authority for the Urban Sanitary District of Sutton (Surrey) to put in force the Compulsory Clauses of the Lands Clauses Acts.	
Local Government Board's Provisional Orders Confirmation (No. 7) Act 1890	53 & 54 Vict. c. lxxxv	4 July 1890
An Act to confirm certain Provisional Orders of the Local Government Board relating to the Urban Sanitary Districts of Blackpool, Leeds, Southport, Street, and Twickenham, and to the Haslingden and Rawtenstall Outfall Sewerage District.
	Blackpool Order 1890 Provisional Order for altering a Local Act (Note: Blackpool Improvement Act 1879 (42 & 43 Vict. c. cxcix)) and a Confirming Act. (Note: Local Government Board's Provisional Orders Confirmation (No. 7) Act 1888 (51 & 52 Vict. c. cxxi))	
	Leeds Order 1890 Provisional Order for altering a Confirming Act. (Note: Local Government Board's Provisional Orders Confirmation (No. 8) Act 1888 (51 & 52 Vict. c. cxxxiii))	
	Southport Order 1890 Provisional Order for altering the Southport Improvement Act, 1885, (Note: Southport Improvement Act 1885 (48 & 49 Vict. c. cxxii)) and a Confirming Act. (Note: Local Government Board's Provisional Orders Confirmation (No. 6) Act 1887 (50 & 51 Vict. c. cxi))	
	Street Order 1890 Provisional Order to enable the Urban Sanitary Authority for the Urban Sanitary District of Street to put in force the Compulsory Clauses of the Lands Clauses Acts.	
	Twickenham Order 1890 Provisional Order to enable the Urban Sanitary Authority for the Urban Sanitary District of Twickenham to put in force the Compulsory Clauses of the Lands Clauses Acts.	
	Haslingden and Rawtenstall Outfall Sewerage District Order 1890 Provisional Order for forming a United District under Section 279 of the Public Health Act, 1875.	
Local Government Board (Ireland) Provisional Order Confirmation (Downpatrick Waterworks) Act 1890	53 & 54 Vict. c. lxxxvi	4 July 1890
An Act to confirm a Provisional Order of the Local Government Board for Ireland relating to Waterworks in the Town of Downpatrick.
	Downpatrick Waterworks Provisional Order 1890 Downpatrick Waterworks. Provisional Order.	
Local Government Board (Ireland) Provisional Order Confirmation (Bangor) Act 1890	53 & 54 Vict. c. lxxxvii	4 July 1890
An Act to confirm a Provisional Order of the Local Government Board for Ireland relating to additional Waterworks and Improvement of Streets in the Town of Bangor.
	Bangor Waterworks and Improvement of Streets Provisional Order 1890 Bangor Additional Waterworks and Improvement of Streets. Provisional Order.	
Local Government Board (Ireland) Provisional Order Confirmation (Dungarvan Waterworks) Act 1890	53 & 54 Vict. c. lxxxviii	4 July 1890
An Act to confirm a Provisional Order of the Local Government Board for Ireland relating to Waterworks in the Town of Dungarvan.
	Dungarvan Waterworks Provisional Order 1890 Dungarvan Waterworks. Provisional Order.	
Local Government Board (Ireland) Provisional Order Confirmation (Foynes Waterworks) Act 1890	53 & 54 Vict. c. lxxxix	4 July 1890
An Act to confirm a Provisional Order of the Local Government Board for Ireland relating to Waterworks in the Town of Foynes.
	Foynes Waterworks Provisional Order 1890 Foynes Waterworks. Provisional Order.	
Local Government Board (Ireland) Provisional Order Confirmation (Drumcondra, Clonliffe, and Glasnevin) Act 1890	53 & 54 Vict. c. xc	4 July 1890
An Act to confirm a Provisional Order of the Local Government Board for Ireland relating to the Drumcondra, Clonliffe, and Glasnevin Township.
	Drumcondra, Clonliffe, and Glasnevin Township Provisional Order 1890 The Drumcondra, Clonliffe, and Glasnevin Township. Provisional Order.	
Local Government Board (Ireland) Provisional Order Confirmation (Belfast Union and Holywood Town) Act 1890	53 & 54 Vict. c. xci	4 July 1890
An Act to confirm a Provisional Order of the Local Government Board for Ireland relating to Part of Belfast Union and Holywood Town United District.
	Belfast and Holywood United District Provisional Order 1890 Belfast Union (part of) and Holywood Town Union District. Provisional Order.	
Local Government Board (Ireland) Provisional Order Confirmation (Wexford) Act 1890	53 & 54 Vict. c. xcii	4 July 1890
An Act to confirm a Provisional Order of the Local Government Board for Ireland relating to Wexford.
	Wexford Burial Ground Provisional Order 1890 Wexford Burial Ground. Provisional Order.	
Allotments Provisional Order Confirmation Act 1890	53 & 54 Vict. c. xciii	4 July 1890
An Act to confirm a Provisional Order made by the County Council of Somerset under the Allotments Act, 1887, (Note: Allotments Act 1887 (50 & 51 Vict. c. 48)) relating to the Parish of Wedmore in the Rural Sanitary District of the Axbridge Union.
	Axbridge Union (Somerset) Order 1890 Axbridge Union. Provisional Order.	
Local Government Board's Provisional Order Confirmation (Artizans and Labourers Dwellings) Act 1890	53 & 54 Vict. c. xciv	4 July 1890
An Act to confirm a Provisional Order of the Local Government Board under the provisions of the Artizans and Labourers Dwellings Improvement Acts 1875 to 1885 relating to the City of Manchester.
	Manchester (Artizans) Order 1890 Provisional Order for confirming an Improvement Scheme under the Artizans and Labourers Dwellings Improvement Acts, 1875 to 1885.	
Local Government Board's Provisional Order Confirmation (Gas) Act 1890 (repealed)	53 & 54 Vict. c. xcv	4 July 1890
An Act to confirm a Provisional Order of the Local Government Board under the provisions of the Gas and Water Works Facilities Act, 1870, (Note: Gas and Water Works Facilities Act 1870 (33 & 34 Vict. c. 70)) and the Public Health Act, 1875, relating to the Local Government District of Burley in Wharfedale. (Repealed by West Yorkshire Act 1980 (c. xiv))
	Burley in Wharfedale Gas Order 1890 Provisional Order under the Gas and Water Works Facilities Act, 1870.	
Anglesey Act Repeal Act 1890	53 & 54 Vict. c. xcvi	4 July 1890
An Act to repeal the Act two and three Edward the Sixth, chapter fifty-four (local), (Note: Anglesea Act 1548 (2 & 3 Edw. 6. c. 15 Pr.)) for keeping the Sessions and County Days of the Isle of Anglesey in Beaumaris.
Pier and Harbour Orders Confirmation (No. 3) Act 1890	53 & 54 Vict. c. xcvii	25 July 1890
An Act to confirm certain Provisional Orders made by the Board of Trade under the General Pier and Harbour Act, 1861, relating to Criccieth, Gloucester, Humber, and Penzance.
	Criccieth Breakwater, Pier and Harbour Order 1890 For the construction maintenance and regulation of a Breakwater Pier and Harbour at Criccieth in the county of Carnarvon.	
	Gloucester Harbour Order 1890 Order for constituting a Harbour Authority for the Maintenance Regulation and Lighting of a Harbour in the Estuary of the River Severn.	
	Humber Conservancy Order 1890 Order for the construction of Training Walls along the Northern shore of the River Humber, in the Parish of Hessle, in the County of York, and in the Borough and County of the Town of Kingston-upon-Hull, and for the Reclamation of Foreshore and Bed of the Humber.	
	Penzance Pier Order 1890 Order for the Construction, Maintenance, and Regulation of a Pier off the Esplanade at Penzance, in the County of Cornwall.	
Pier and Harbour Order Confirmation (No. 4) Act 1890	53 & 54 Vict. c. xcviii	25 July 1890
An Act to confirm a Provisional Order made by the Board of Trade under the General Pier and Harbour Act, 1861, relating to Saint Mary's (Scilly).
	St. Mary's (Scilly) Pier Order 1890 Order for the maintenance and regulation of a Harbour Pier and Works at St. Mary's in the Islands of Scilly in the County of Cornwall.	
Gas Orders Confirmation (No. 2) Act 1890	53 & 54 Vict. c. xcix	25 July 1890
An Act to confirm certain Provisional Orders made by the Board of Trade under the Gas and Water Works Facilities Act, 1870, relating to Huntingdon and Godmanchester Gas, Llandrindod Water Gas, Studley Gas, and Wellingborough Gas.
	Huntingdon and Godmanchester Gas Order 1890 Order empowering the Huntingdon and Godmanchester Gas and Coke Company Limited to maintain and continue gasworks and to make and supply gas in the boroughs of Huntingdon and Godmanchester both in the county of Huntington.	
	Llandrindod Water Gas Order 1890 Order authorising the construction and maintenance of water gasworks and the supply of water gas within the parishes and places of Llandrindod Llandrindod-Wells Cefnllys and Trefonen all in the county of Radnor.	
	Studley Gas Order 1890 Order empowering the Studley Gas Coal and Coke Company (Limited) to maintain and continue gasworks and to manufacture and supply gas within the parishes of Studley and Sambourne in the county of Warwick.	
	Wellingborough Gas Order 1890 Order empowering the Wellingborough Gaslight Company (Limited) to extend their limits of supply.	
Water Orders Confirmation (No. 1) Act 1890	53 & 54 Vict. c. c	25 July 1890
An Act to confirm certain Provisional Orders made by the Board of Trade under the Gas and Water Works Facilities Act, 1870, relating to Caton Water, Mid Kent Water, Stockport District Water, and Todmorden Water.
	Caton Water Order 1890 Order authorising the construction and maintenance of waterworks, and the supply of water in the township of Caton and part of the township of Quernmore, in the parish of Lancaster in the county of Lancaster.	
	Mid Kent Water Order 1890 Order empowering the Mid Kent Water Company Limited to construct additional waterworks to extend their limits of supply and to raise additional capital.	
	Stockport District Water Order 1890 Order empowering the Stockport District Waterworks Company to raise additional capital.	
	Todmorden Water Order 1890 Order empowering the Todmorden Waterworks Company to raise additional capital.	
Water Orders Confirmation (No. 2) Act 1890	53 & 54 Vict. c. ci	25 July 1890
An Act to confirm certain Provisional Orders made by the Board of Trade under the Gas and Water Works Facilities Act, 1870, relating to Camborne Water, Frith Hill, Godalming, and Farncombe Water, Leatherhead and District Water, and Usk Water.
	Camborne Water Order 1890 Order empowering the Cambourne Water Company to raise additional capital and to construct additional works.	
	Frith Hill, Godalming and Farncombe Water Order 1890 Order empowering the Frith Hill, Godalming and Farncombe Water Company Limited to construct additional Waterworks and to extend their Limits of Supply.	
	Leatherhead and District Water Order 1890 Order empowering the Leatherhead and District Waterworks Company to raise additional Capital.	
	Usk Water Order 1890 Order empowering the Usk Waterworks Company (Limited) to construct and maintain Waterworks and to supply Water in parts of the Parishes of Monkswood Llanbaddoc Gwehelog and Usk all in the County of Monmouth.	
Education Department Provisional Order Confirmation (London) Act 1890	53 & 54 Vict. c. cii	25 July 1890
An Act to confirm a Provisional Order made by the Education Department under the Elementary Education Act, 1870, (Note: Elementary Education Act 1870 (33 & 34 Vict. c. 75)) to enable the School Board for London to put in force the Lands Clauses Consolidation Act, 1845, (Note: Lands Clauses Consolidation Act 1845 (8 & 9 Vict. c. 18)) and the Acts amending the same.
	Provisional Order for putting in force the Lands Clauses Consolidation Act, 1845.	
Education Department Provisional Order Confirmation (West Ham) Act 1890	53 & 54 Vict. c. ciii	25 July 1890
An Act to confirm a Provisional Order made by the Education Department under the Elementary Education Act, 1870, to enable the School Board for West Ham to put in force the Lands Clauses Consolidation Act, 1845, and the Acts amending the same.
	Provisional Order for putting in force the Lands Clauses Consolidation Act, 1845.	
Great Northern Railway (Various Powers) Act 1890	53 & 54 Vict. c. civ	25 July 1890
An Act to confer further Powers upon the Great Northern Railway Company with respect to their own and other Undertakings to enable them to acquire the Undertaking of the Spilsby and Firsby Railway Company and for other Purposes.
Belfast Corporation (Various Powers) Act 1890	53 & 54 Vict. c. cv	25 July 1890
An Act to vest in the Corporation of Belfast the White Linen Hall and surrounding land connected therewith and to provide for the adjustment of certain accounts relative to the Cemetery.
Newcastle and Gateshead Waterworks Act 1890	53 & 54 Vict. c. cvi	25 July 1890
An Act for the granting of further Powers to the Newcastle and Gateshead Water Company; and for other purposes.
Higham and Hundred of Hoo Water Act 1890	53 & 54 Vict. c. cvii	25 July 1890
An Act for incorporating the Higham and Hundred of Hoo Water Company and empowering them to construct Works and supply Water and for other purposes.
Great Eastern Railway (General Powers) Act 1890	53 & 54 Vict. c. cviii	25 July 1890
An Act for conferring further powers upon the Great Eastern Railway Company and for extending the time and reviving the powers for the compulsory purchase of lands for and for the construction and completion of certain authorised works of the Company and for other purposes.
Bristol Floods Prevention Act 1890	53 & 54 Vict. c. cix	25 July 1890
An Act to enable the Mayor Aldermen and Burgesses of the City of Bristol to construct Culverts and other Works for the Relief of the Floods in the River Frome and in the Malago Brook and for other purposes.
Clergy Mutual Assurance Society Act 1890 (repealed)	53 & 54 Vict. c. cx	25 July 1890
An Act to make provision for assigning Interim Bonus and for discontinuance of Sickness Assurances by the Clergy Mutual Assurance Society and as to the investment of Moneys of and conferring further Powers on the Society and for other purposes. (Repealed by Clergy Mutual Assurance Society Act 1914 (4 & 5 Geo. 5. c. clxx))
Alexandra (Newport and South Wales) Docks and Railway Act 1890	53 & 54 Vict. c. cxi	25 July 1890
An Act to extend the time for the completion of certain authorised Works by the Alexandra (Newport and South Wales) Docks and Railway Company to confer further powers on that Company and for other purposes.
Easton and Church Hope Railway Act 1890	53 & 54 Vict. c. cxii	25 July 1890
An Act to revive the Powers and extend the Periods for the compulsory Purchase of Lands and for the construction of so much of the Railways authorised by the Easton and Church Hope Railway (Portland Extension) Act 1884 (Note: Easton and Church Hope Railway (Portland Extension) Act 1884 (47 & 48 Vict. c. cclviii)) as has not been abandoned under the authority of the Easton and Church Hope Railway Act 1887 (Note: Easton and Church Hope Railway Act 1887 (50 & 51 Vict. c. cxc)) and for other Purposes.
Porthdinlleyn Railway Act 1890 (repealed)	53 & 54 Vict. c. cxiii	25 July 1890
An Act to extend the Powers of the Porthdinlleyn Railway Company for the acquisition of Lands for and the completion of their authorised Railway and for other purposes. (Repealed by Porthdinlleyn Railway (Abandonment) Act 1892 (55 & 56 Vict. c. xcvi))
City and South London Railway Act 1890	53 & 54 Vict. c. cxiv	25 July 1890
An Act to empower the City of London and Southwark Subway Company to extend their authorised Subway to Clapham to change the name of the Company and for other purposes.
Huddersfield Corporation Waterworks Act 1890	53 & 54 Vict. c. cxv	25 July 1890
An Act to vest in the Mayor Aldermen and Burgesses of the County Borough of Huddersfield the Undertaking of the Wessenden Commissioners and to authorise the said Mayor Aldermen and Burgesses to construct additional Waterworks and for other purposes.
Cheshire Lines Act 1890	53 & 54 Vict. c. cxvi	25 July 1890
An Act for conferring further powers upon the Cheshire Lines Committee and for other purposes.
Stockton and Middlesbrough Waterworks Act 1890	53 & 54 Vict. c. cxvii	25 July 1890
An Act to amend the Acts relating to the supply of water by the Stockton and Middlesbrough Water Board and to confer further powers on the said board and for other purposes.
West Highland Railway Act 1890	53 & 54 Vict. c. cxviii	25 July 1890
An Act to empower the West Highland Railway Company to deviate certain parts of their authorised railway and to construct new railways and a pier in connection therewith to raise further capital and for other purposes.
London Chatham and Dover Railway (Capital) Act 1890	53 & 54 Vict. c. cxix	25 July 1890
An Act to enable the London Chatham and Dover Rail way Company to raise further capital.
Brechin and Edzell District Railway Act 1890	53 & 54 Vict. c. cxx	25 July 1890
An Act to authorise the construction of a Railway in the County of Forfar to be called the Brechin and Edzell District Railway.
Wallasey Local Board Act 1890	53 & 54 Vict. c. cxxi	25 July 1890
An Act to make better provision for the improvement and health of the local government district of Wallasey in the County of Chester and for other purposes.
Crieff and Comrie Railway Act 1890	53 & 54 Vict. c. cxxii	25 July 1890
An Act for incorporating the Crieff and Comrie Railway Company and for authorising the construction of a Railway from Crieff to Comrie in the County of Perth and for other purposes.
Burnley Rectory Act 1890	53 & 54 Vict. c. cxxiii	25 July 1890
An Act for vesting the endowments of the Rectory of Burnley in the County Palatine of Lancaster in the Ecclesiastical Commissioners for England and providing for the re endowment of the said Rectory and for the endowment of other benefices and for transferring the patronage of the said Rectory to the Bishop of Manchester and for other Ecclesiastical purposes.
Church of Scotland Ministers' Widows' Fund Act 1890 (repealed)	53 & 54 Vict. c. cxxiv	25 July 1890
An Act to amend an Act made in the nineteenth year of the reign of His Majesty King George the Third, chapter twenty, (Note: Ministers' Widows Fund (Scotland) Act 1779 (19 Geo. 3. c. 20)) and another Act made in the fifty-fourth year of the reign of His said Majesty, chapter one hundred and sixty-nine, (Note: Scottish Ministers' Widows' Fund Act 1814 (54 Geo. 3. c. clxix)) for the better raising and securing a Fund for a provision for the Widows and Children of the Ministers of the Church of Scotland, and of the Heads, Principals and Masters in the Universities of Saint Andrews, Glasgow, Edinburgh, and Aberdeen; and for other purposes. (Repealed by Church of Scotland Ministers' and Scotland University Professors' Widows' Fund Order Confirmation Act 1923 (13 & 14 Geo. 5. c. lxv))
Pontypridd (Mill Street and Rhondda Road, &c.) Improvements Act 1890	53 & 54 Vict. c. cxxv	25 July 1890
An Act to authorise the improvement of certain Streets in the town of Pontypridd in the county of Glamorgan and for other purposes.
North Sea Fisheries (East Lincolnshire) Harbour and Dock Act 1890	53 & 54 Vict. c. cxxvi	25 July 1890
An Act to revive and extend the Powers for the purchase of Lands and also to extend the time for the completion of the Harbour and Dock authorised by the North Sea Fisheries (East Lincolnshire) Harbour and Dock Act 1884 (Note: North Sea Fisheries (East Lincolnshire) Harbour and Dock Act 1884 (47 & 48 Vict. c. xxxiii)) and for other purposes.
East and West Yorkshire Union Railways Act 1890	53 & 54 Vict. c. cxxvii	25 July 1890
An Act for the abandonment of parts and extension of time for the compulsory purchase of lands for and for the completion of other parts of the authorised Railways of the East and West Yorkshire Union Railways Company and for other purposes.
Metropolitan Railway Act 1890	53 & 54 Vict. c. cxxviii	25 July 1890
An Act for conferring further powers upon the Metropolitan Railway Company in relation to their own and other undertakings for vesting in them the Undertaking of the Aylesbury and Buckingham Railway Company and for authorizing agreements with other railway companies and for other purposes.
North Eastern Railway Act 1890	53 & 54 Vict. c. cxxix	25 July 1890
An Act for enabling the North Eastern Railway Company to make new Railways and Works and to acquire additional Lands and for other purposes.
Walsall Corporation Act 1890 (repealed)	53 & 54 Vict. c. cxxx	25 July 1890
An Act to extend the boundaries of the Borough of Walsall to make better provision for the health local government and improvement of the Borough to provide for the creation and issue of Corporation Stock and for other purposes. (Repealed by Walsall Corporation Act 1969 (c. lviii))
Caledonian Railway (Additional Powers) Act 1890	53 & 54 Vict. c. cxxxi	25 July 1890
An Act for enabling the Caledonian Railway Company to make and maintain certain Railways and other works and take lands in the Counties of Lanark and Midlothian and to raise additional money for confirming certain agreements and for other purposes.
Weston-super-Mare, Clevedon and Portishead Tramways Act 1890	53 & 54 Vict. c. cxxxii	25 July 1890
An Act to extend the time limited for the completion of the works authorised by the Weston-super-Mare Clevedon and Portishead Tramways Act 1885 (Note: Weston-super-Mare Clevedon and Portishead Tramways Act 1885 (48 & 49 Vict. c. clxxxii)) and for other purposes.
Rhymney Railway Act 1890	53 & 54 Vict. c. cxxxiii	25 July 1890
An Act to authorise the Rhymney Railway Company to make new Railways to raise additional Capital and for other purposes.
South Western Railway (Stock Conversion) Act 1890	53 & 54 Vict. c. cxxxiv	25 July 1890
An Act for authorising the London and South Western Railway Company to create Preferred Converted Ordinary Stock and Deferred Converted Ordinary Stock in substitution for existing Ordinary Stock and for other purposes.
Caledonian Railway (Conversion of Stock) Act 1890	53 & 54 Vict. c. cxxxv	25 July 1890
An Act for authorising the Caledonian Railway Company to convert their Ordinary Stock into Preferred Converted Ordinary Stock and Deferred Converted Ordinary Stock and for other purposes.
Manchester, Sheffield, and Lincolnshire Railway Act 1890	53 & 54 Vict. c. cxxxvi	25 July 1890
An Act to authorise the Manchester Sheffield and Lincolnshire Railway Company to make new Railways to confer further powers on the Company in connection with their Undertaking and for other purposes.
Isle of Wight Railway Act 1890	53 & 54 Vict. c. cxxxvii	25 July 1890
An Act to confer further powers on the Isle of Wight Railway Company to consolidate and re-arrange the capital of that Company and for other purposes.
Midland Railway (Additional Powers) Act 1890	53 & 54 Vict. c. cxxxviii	25 July 1890
An Act to confer additional powers upon the Midland Railway Company and upon that Company and the Great Northern and London and North Western Railway Companies respectively for the construction of works and the acquisition of lands for vesting in the Midland Railway Company and the Great Western Railway Company the Undertaking and powers of the Bristol Port Railway and Pier Company and for other purposes.
Bute Docks Act 1890	53 & 54 Vict. c. cxxxix	25 July 1890
An Act for authorising the transfer to the Bute Docks Company of the powers of making railways and other powers conferred by the Rhymney Railway Act 1888 (Note: Rhymney Railway Act 1888 (51 & 52 Vict. c. clxxvii)) and for other purposes.
Taff Vale Railway Act 1890	53 & 54 Vict. c. cxl	25 July 1890
An Act to empower the Taff Vale Railway Company to construct new Railways and for other purposes.
Belfast Parliamentary Borough Registration Act 1890	53 & 54 Vict. c. cxli	25 July 1890
An Act to provide for the Revision of the Lists of Parliamentary Voters in the Parliamentary Borough of Belfast, and the Payment of the Expenses thereof.
Elgin and Lossiemouth Harbour (Loans) Act 1890	53 & 54 Vict. c. cxlii	4 August 1890
An Act to enable the Elgin and Lossiemouth Harbour Company to deepen and improve Lossiemouth Harbour to raise further moneys and for other purposes.
Hastings Harbour Act 1890	53 & 54 Vict. c. cxliii	4 August 1890
An Act for the incorporation of Commissioners and for the construction of Harbour Piers and other Works at Hastings in the County of Sussex and for other purposes.
Newport (Monmouthshire) Harbour Act 1890	53 & 54 Vict. c. cxliv	4 August 1890
An Act to amend the Acts relating to the Port or Harbour of Newport in the County of Monmouth and for incorporating and conferring further powers upon the Newport Harbour Commissioners and for other purposes.
Rhondda and Swansea Bay Railway Act 1890	53 & 54 Vict. c. cxlv	4 August 1890
An Act to authorise the Rhondda and Swansea Bay Railway Company to construct new Railways and other works and to confer further powers upon that Company and for other purposes.
Wharfe River Navigation Act 1890	53 & 54 Vict. c. cxlvi	4 August 1890
An Act for incorporating the Wharfe River Navigation Company and empowering them to make the waterway of the River Wharfe navigable between Tadcaster and the River Ouse in the West Riding of the County of York and for other purpose.
Folkestone Pier and Lift Act 1890 (repealed)	53 & 54 Vict. c. cxlvii	4 August 1890
An Act to empower the Folkestone Pier and Lift Company to raise further capital and for other purposes. (Repealed by Folkestone Pier and Lift Act 1937 (1 Edw. 8 & 1 Geo. 6. c. xxxvii))
London, Brighton and South Coast Railway (Various Powers) Act 1890	53 & 54 Vict. c. cxlviii	4 August 1890
An Act to confer further powers on the London Brighton and South Coast Railway Company and for other purposes.
South Eastern Railway Act 1890	53 & 54 Vict. c. cxlix	4 August 1890
An Act for conferring further Powers upon the South Eastern Railway Company in connexion with their own undertaking and those of other Companies and for other purposes.
Dewsbury and Heckmondwike Water Act 1890 (repealed)	53 & 54 Vict. c. cl	4 August 1890
An Act to extend the time limited by the Dewsbury and Heckmondwike Waterworks Act 1876 (Note: Dewsbury and Heckmondwike Waterworks Act 1876 (39 & 40 Vict. c. clxxxv)) for the construction of certain reservoirs and works thereby authorised and to extend the powers of the Dewsbury and Heckmondwike Waterworks Board the Corporation of Dewsbury and the Heckmondwike Local Board and for other purposes. (Repealed by Mid Calder Water Board Order 1965 (SI 1965/2006))
Morley Corporation Water Act 1890	53 & 54 Vict. c. cli	4 August 1890
An Act to empower the Corporation of Morley in the West Riding of the County of York to make additional waterworks and for other purposes.
Glasgow Corporation Act 1890	53 & 54 Vict. c. clii	4 August 1890
An Act to authorise the Corporation of Glasgow to make and maintain River Walls or Embankments on the River Clyde and for other purposes.
Great Northern Railway (Capital) Act 1890	53 & 54 Vict. c. cliii	4 August 1890
An Act for re arranging the Capital of the Great Northern Railway Company and for other purposes.
London and North Western Railway Act 1890	53 & 54 Vict. c. cliv	4 August 1890
An Act for conferring further powers upon the London and North Western Railway Company in relation to their own Undertaking and other Undertakings in which they are interested jointly with other Companies and also for conferring Powers upon the Great Western and Manchester Sheffield and Lincolnshire Railway Companies in relation to such other Undertakings and for other purposes.
Severn Navigation Act 1890	53 & 54 Vict. c. clv	4 August 1890
An Act for further improving the Navigation of the River Severn for conferring additional powers on the Severn Commissioners and for other purposes.
Clyde Navigation Act 1890	53 & 54 Vict. c. clvi	4 August 1890
An Act to authorise the Trustees of the Clyde Navigation to construct a new Road with Tramways thereon in part substitution for certain Roads and Tramways authorised by the Clyde Navigation Act 1883 (Note: Clyde Navigation Act 1883 (46 & 47 Vict. c. clvi)) to construct a Graving Dock to abandon some of the works authorised by that Act to revive and extend the period limited by that Act for the compulsory purchase of lands and to extend the period limited for the completion of the Railway authorised thereby to vary a certain Agreement with and relative obligation to the Vale of Clyde Tramways Company and for other purposes.
Lancashire and Yorkshire Railway Act 1890	53 & 54 Vict. c. clvii	4 August 1890
An Act for conferring further Powers on the Lancashire and Yorkshire Railway Company and for other purposes.
Tottenham and Forest Gate Railway Act 1890	53 & 54 Vict. c. clviii	4 August 1890
An Act to authorise the construction of Railways between Tottenham and Forest Gate and for other purposes.
Great Western Railway Act 1890	53 & 54 Vict. c. clix	4 August 1890
An Act for conferring further powers upon the Great Western Railway Company for vesting in that Company the Undertakings of the Whitland and Cardigan the East Gloucestershire and the Witney Railway Companies for confirming an Agreement with the Woodstock Railway Company and for other purposes.
Ystrad Gas and Water Works Act 1890 (repealed)	53 & 54 Vict. c. clx	4 August 1890
An Act to enable the Ystrad Gas and Water Company to construct additional Waterworks to purchase additional lands for their Gas and Water Undertakings and for other purposes. (Repealed by Rhondda Corporation Act 1973 (c. xxiii))
Bray Township Act 1890	53 & 54 Vict. c. clxi	4 August 1890
An Act to enable the Commissioners of the Bray Township to construct an addition to the Sea-Wall a Promenade Pier and Harbour and other Works and to consolidate their Debt and issue Debenture Stock and for other purposes.
Glasgow District Subway Act 1890 (repealed)	53 & 54 Vict. c. clxii	4 August 1890
An Act for making Subways in the city and suburbs of Glasgow; and for other purposes. (Repealed by Glasgow Corporation Consolidation (Water, Transport and Markets) Order Confirmation Act 1964 (c. xliii))
Mersey Railway Act 1890	53 & 54 Vict. c. clxiii	4 August 1890
An Act to extend the time for the purchase of Land and for the completion of certain Railways in Liverpool and Birkenhead and to confer further powers on the Mersey Railway Company and for other purposes.
Penzance and Newlyn Tramways Act 1890	53 & 54 Vict. c. clxiv	4 August 1890
An Act for incorporating and conferring powers on the Penzance and Newlyn Tramways Company and for further purposes.
Saint Anne and Saint Mary Manchester (Union of Benefices) Act 1890	53 & 54 Vict. c. clxv	4 August 1890
An Act to provide for the Union of the Benefices of Saint Anne and Saint Mary both in the City of Manchester; and for other purposes.
Forfar and Brechin Railway Act 1890	53 & 54 Vict. c. clxvi	4 August 1890
An Act to incorporate the Forfar and Brechin Railway Company and to empower them to construct Railways in the County of Forfar and for other purposes.
Caledonian Railway (Edinburgh, Leith and Newhaven Extension Lines) Act 1890	53 & 54 Vict. c. clxvii	4 August 1890
An Act for enabling the Caledonian Railway Company to make and maintain certain Railways extending their Undertaking in Edinburgh Leith and Newhaven and other Works in the County of Midlothian and to raise additional money and for other purposes.
Kirkcaldy and District Railway Act 1890	53 & 54 Vict. c. clxviii	4 August 1890
An Act to authorise the Kirkcaldy and District Railway Company to extend their railways and for other purposes.
Liverpool Corporation Act 1890 (repealed)	53 & 54 Vict. c. clxix	4 August 1890
An Act for amending the provisions of certain Local Acts in force in the City of Liverpool and for other purposes. (Repealed by Liverpool Corporation Act 1921 (11 & 12 Geo. 5. c. lxxiv))
Manchester, Middleton, and District Tramways Act 1890	53 & 54 Vict. c. clxx	4 August 1890
An Act to extend the time for completing the Manchester Middleton and District Tramways.
Walton-on-the-Naze Improvement Act 1890	53 & 54 Vict. c. clxxi	4 August 1890
An Act to authorise and provide for certain Sea Defence Works and Improvements at and near Walton-on-the-Naze in the county of Essex to re-constitute the Walton Improvement Commissioners and make provision for their Election and to enlarge their powers and for other purposes.
Commercial Union Assurance Company Act 1890 (repealed)	53 & 54 Vict. c. clxxii	4 August 1890
An Act to extend the Objects and enlarge the Powers of the Commercial Union Assurance Company Limited and for other purposes. (Repealed by Commercial Union Assurance Company Act 1908 (8 Edw. 7. c. lxvii))
Patriotic Assurance Company Act 1890	53 & 54 Vict. c. clxxiii	4 August 1890
An Act to define and extend the objects of the Patriotic Assurance Company of Ireland and for other purposes.
Local Government Board's Provisional Order Confirmation (Poor Law) Act 1890	53 & 54 Vict. c. clxxiv	4 August 1890
An Act to confirm a Provisional Order of the Local Government Board under the provisions of the Poor Law Amendment Act, 1867, (Note: Poor Law Amendment Act 1867 (30 & 31 Vict. c. 106)) relating to the Hundred of Mutford and Lothingland.
	Mutford and Lothingland Order 1890	
Local Government Board's Provisional Order Confirmation (Artizans' and Labourers' Dwellings) (No. 2) Act 1890	53 & 54 Vict. c. clxxv	4 August 1890
An Act to confirm a Provisional Order of the Local Government Board under the provisions of the Artizans and Labourers Dwellings Improvement Acts, 1875 to 1885, relating to the Borough of Brighton.
	Brighton (Artizans) Order 1890 Provisional Order for confirming an Improvement Scheme under the Artizans and Labourers Dwellings Improvement Acts, 1875 to 1885.	
Local Government Board's Provisional Order Confirmation (No. 6) Act 1890	53 & 54 Vict. c. clxxvi	4 August 1890
An Act to confirm a Provisional Order of the Local Government Board relating to the Isles of Scilly.
	Isles of Scilly Order 1890	
Local Government Board's Provisional Orders Confirmation (No. 8) Act 1890	53 & 54 Vict. c. clxxvii	4 August 1890
An Act to confirm certain Provisional Orders of the Local Government Board relating to the Boroughs of Cardiff and Leeds.
	Cardiff Order 1890	
	Leeds Order 1890	
Local Government Board's Provisional Orders Confirmation (No. 9) Act 1890	53 & 54 Vict. c. clxxviii	4 August 1890
An Act to confirm certain Provisional Orders of the Local Government Board relating to the Boroughs of Abingdon, Canterbury, and Lowestoft.
	Borough of Abingdon Order 1890	
	City of Canterbury Order 1890	
	Borough of Lowestoft Order 1890	
Local Government Board's Provisional Orders Confirmation (No. 10) Act 1890	53 & 54 Vict. c. clxxix	4 August 1890
An Act to confirm certain Provisional Orders of the Local Government Board relating to the Urban Sanitary Districts of Bacup, Blackburn, Bournemouth, Burnley, Criccieth, and Nelson, and to the Godalming Main Sewerage District.
	Bacup Order 1890	
	Blackburn Order 1890	
	Bournemouth Order 1890	
	Burnley Order 1890	
	Criccieth Order 1890	
	Nelson Order 1890	
	Godalming Order 1890	
Local Government Board's Provisional Orders Confirmation (No. 12) Act 1890	53 & 54 Vict. c. clxxx	4 August 1890
An Act to confirm certain Provisional Orders of the Local Government Board relating to the Urban Sanitary Districts of Chorley and Middleton.
	Chorley Order 1890	
	Middleton Order 1890	
Tramways Orders Confirmation (No. 1) Act 1890	53 & 54 Vict. c. clxxxi	4 August 1890
An Act to confirm certain Provisional Orders made by the Board of Trade under the Tramways Act, 1870, (Note: Tramways Act 1870 (33 & 34 Vict. c. 78)) relating to Bradford Corporation Tramways, Drypool and Marfleet Steam Tramways, Dudley, Netherton, Old Hill, and Cradley Tramways National Rifle Association (Bisley Common) Tramway, Norwich Tramways, Tong Local Board Tramway, and Worcester Tramways.
	Bradford Corporation Tramways Order 1890	
	Drypool and Marfleet Steam Tramways Order 1890	
	Dudley, Netherton Old Hill and Cradley Tramways (Abandonment) Order 1890	
	National Rifle Association (Bisley Common Tramway) Order 1890	
	Norwich Tramways (Abandonment of Tramways and Release of Deposit) Order 1890	
	Tong Local Board Tramway Order 1890	
	Worcester Tramways (Abandonment and Release of Deposit) Order 1890	
Tramways Orders Confirmation (No. 2) Act 1890	53 & 54 Vict. c. clxxxii	4 August 1890
An Act to confirm certain Provisional Orders made by the Board of Trade under the Tramways Act, 1870, relating to Bradford and District Tramways (Extension), Lea Bridge, Leyton, and Walthamstow Tramways, Poole and Bournemouth Tramways, and Warboys and Puddock Drove Tramway.
	Bradford and District Tramways (Extension) Order 1890	
	Lea Bridge, Leyton and Walthamstow Tramways Order 1890	
	Poole and Bournemouth Tramways Order 1890	
	Warboys and Puddock Drove Tramway Order 1890	
Gas and Water Orders Confirmation Act 1890	53 & 54 Vict. c. clxxxiii	4 August 1890
An Act to confirm certain Provisional Orders made by the Board of Trade under the Gas and Water Works Facilities Act, 1870, relating to Barnoldswick Gas, Hollingworth Gas, Ware Gas, and Aldershot Gas and Water.
	Barnoldswick Gas Order 1890	
	Hollingworth Gas Order 1890	
	Ware Gas Order 1890	
	Aldershot Gas and Water Order 1890	
Birstall Wesleyan Chapel Trust Scheme Confirmation Act 1890	53 & 54 Vict. c. clxxxiv	4 August 1890
An Act to confirm a Scheme of the Charity Commissioners for the Charity known as "The Wesleyan Methodist Chapel, School-house, Dwelling-house (or Preacher's Residence), and Trust Property," in the parish of Birstall, in the West Riding of the county of York.
	Birstall Wesleyan Chapel Scheme.	
Shrewsbury and Holyhead Road (Anglesey and Carnarvon) Act 1890	53 & 54 Vict. c. clxxxv	4 August 1890
An Act to make further provision concerning certain portions of the Shrewsbury and Holyhead Road.
Electric Lighting Orders Confirmation Act 1890	53 & 54 Vict. c. clxxxvi	4 August 1890
An Act to confirm certain Provisional Orders made by the Board of Trade under the Electric Lighting Acts, 1882 (Note: Electric Lighting Act 1882 (45 & 46 Vict. c. 56)) and 1888, (Note: Electric Lighting Act 1888 (51 & 52 Vict. c. 12)) relating to Cambridge, Dover, Hove, Walsall, Wolverhampton, and Worcester.
	Cambridge Electric Lighting Order 1890	
	Dover Electric Lighting Order 1890	
	Hove Electric Lighting Order 1890	
	Walsall Electric Lighting Order 1890	
	Wolverhampton Electric Lighting Order 1890	
	Worcester Electric Lighting Order 1890	
Electric Lighting Orders Confirmation (No. 2) Act 1890	53 & 54 Vict. c. clxxxvii	4 August 1890
An Act to confirm certain Provisional Orders made by the Board of Trade under the Electric Lighting Acts, 1882 and 1888, relating to Burnley, Bury, Chester, Fleetwood, Lancaster, and Salford.
	Burnley Electric Lighting Order 1890	
	Bury Electric Lighting Order 1890	
	Chester Electric Lighting Order 1890	
	Fleetwood Electric Lighting Order 1890	
	Lancaster Electric Lighting Order 1890	
	Salford Electric Lighting Order 1890	
Electric Lighting Orders Confirmation (No. 3) Act 1890	53 & 54 Vict. c. clxxxviii	4 August 1890
An Act to confirm certain Provisional Orders made by the Board of Trade under the Electric Lighting Acts, 1882 and 1888, relating to Bacup, Bedford, Huddersfield, Malvern, Oldham, and Stockton-on-Tees.
	Bacup Electric Lighting Order 1890	
	Bedford Electric Lighting Order 1890	
	Huddersfield Electric Lighting Order 1890	
	Malvern Electric Lighting Order 1890	
	Oldham Electric Lighting Order 1890	
	Stockton-on-Tees Electric Lighting Order 1890	
Electric Lighting Orders Confirmation (No. 4) Act 1890	53 & 54 Vict. c. clxxxix	4 August 1890
An Act to confirm certain Provisional Orders made by the Board of Trade under the Electric Lighting Acts, 1882 and 1888, relating to Accrington, Barnsley, Blackpool, Burton-on-Trent, Cheltenham, and Darlington.
	Accrington Electric Lighting Order 1890	
	Barnsley Electric Lighting Order 1890	
	Blackpool Electric Lighting Order 1890	
	Burton-upon-Trent Electric Lighting Order 1890	
	Cheltenham Electric Lighting Order 1890	
	Darlington Electric Lighting Order 1890	
Electric Lighting Orders Confirmation (No. 5) Act 1890	53 & 54 Vict. c. cxc	4 August 1890
An Act to confirm certain Provisional Orders made by the Board of Trade under the Electric Lighting Acts, 1882 and 1888, relating to Bournemouth, Derby, Hastings, and St. Leonards-on-Sea, Oxford, Portsmouth, and Woking.
	Bournemouth Electric Supply (House-to-House) Order 1890 Provisional Order granted by the Board of Trade, under the Electric Lighting Acts, 1882 and 1888, to the South of England House-to-House Electricity Company, Limited.	
	Derby Corporation Electric Lighting Order 1890 Provisional Order granted by the Board of Trade, under the Electric Lighting Acts, 1882 and 1888, to the Mayor, Aldermen and Burgesses of the Borough of Derby.	
	Hastings and St. Leonard's-on-Sea Electric Supply Order 1890 Provisional Order granted by the Board of Trade, under the Electric Lighting Acts, 1882 and 1888, to the Hastings and St. Leonards-on-Sea Electric Light Company, Limited.	
	Oxford Electric Lighting Order 1890 Provisional Order granted by the Board of Trade, under the Electric Lighting Acts, 1882 and 1888, to the Electric Installation and Maintenance Company, Limited.	
	Portsmouth Electric Lighting Order 1890 Provisional Order granted by the Board of Trade, under the Electric Lighting Acts, 1882 and 1888, to the Mayor, Aldermen, and Burgesses of the Borough of Portsmouth.	
	Woking Electric Supply Company Order 1890 Provisional Order granted by the Board of Trade, under the Electric Lighting Acts, 1882 and 1888, to the Woking Electric Supply Company, Limited.	
Electric Lighting Orders Confirmation (No. 6) Act 1890	53 & 54 Vict. c. cxci	4 August 1890
An Act to confirm certain Provisional Orders made by the Board of Trade under the Electric Lighting Acts, 1882 and 1888, relating to Birkenhead, Great Yarmouth, Kingston-upon-Hull, Nottingham, Wigan, and York.
	Birkenhead Electric Lighting Order 1890 Provisional Order granted by the Board of Trade, under the Electric Lighting Acts, 1882 and 1888, to the Mayor, Aldermen and Burgesses of the Borough of Birkenhead.	
	Great Yarmouth Electric Lighting Order 1890 Provisional Order granted by the Board of Trade, under the Electric Lighting Acts, 1882 and 1888, to the Mayor, Aldermen and Burgesses of the Borough of Great Yarmouth.	
	Kingston-upon-Hull Electric Lighting Order 1890 Provisional Order granted by the Board of Trade, under the Electric Lighting Acts, 1882 and 1888, to the Mayor, Aldermen and Burgesses of the Borough of Kingston-upon-Hull.	
	Nottingham Electric Lighting Order 1890 Provisional Order granted by the Board of Trade, under the Electric Lighting Acts, 1882 and 1888, to the Mayor, Aldermen and Burgesses of the Borough of Nottingham.	
	Wigan Electric Lighting Order 1890 Provisional Order granted by the Board of Trade, under the Electric Lighting Acts, 1882 and 1888, to the Mayor, Aldermen and Burgesses of the Borough of Wigan.	
	York Electric Lighting Order 1890 Provisional Order granted by the Board of Trade, under the Electric Lighting Acts, 1882 and 1888, to the Mayor, Aldermen and Citizens of the Borough of York.	
Electric Lighting Orders Confirmation (No. 7) Act 1890	53 & 54 Vict. c. cxcii	4 August 1890
An Act to confirm certain Provisional Orders made by the Board of Trade under the Electric Lighting Acts, 1882 and 1888, relating to Belfast, Blackburn, Leicester, Morecambe, Sevenoaks, and Tunstall.
	Belfast Electric Lighting Order 1890 Provisional Order granted by the Board of Trade, under the Electric Lighting Acts, 1882 and 1888, to the mayor, aldermen and citizens of the city of Belfast.	
	Blackburn Electric Lighting Order 1890 Provisional Order granted by the Board of Trade, under the Electric Lighting Acts, 1882 and 1888, to the mayor, aldermen and burgesses of the borough of Blackburn.	
	Leicester Electric Lighting Order 1890 Provisional Order granted by the Board of Trade, under the Electric Lighting Acts, 1882 and 1888, to the mayor, aldermen and burgesses of the borough of Leicester.	
	Morecambe Electric Light and Power Order 1890 Provisional Order granted by the Board of Trade, under the Electric Lighting Acts, 1882 and 1888, to Thomas Reginald Andrews and Thomas Preece.	
	Sevenoaks Electric Lighting Order 1890 Provisional Order granted by the Board of Trade, under the Electric Lighting Acts, 1882 and 1888, to the Electric Trust Limited.	
	Tunstall Electric Lighting Order 1890 Provisional Order granted by the Board of Trade, under the Electric Lighting Acts, 1882 and 1888, to the Electric Trust Limited.	
Electric Lighting Orders Confirmation (No. 8) Act 1890	53 & 54 Vict. c. cxciii	4 August 1890
An Act to confirm certain Provisional Orders made by the Board of Trade under the Electric Lighting Acts, 1882 and 1888, relating to Ayr, Bognor, Eastbourne, Galway, Stafford, and Tiverton.
	Ayr Burgh Electric Lighting Order 1890 Provisional Order granted by the Board of Trade, under the Electric Lighting Acts, 1882 and 1888, to the Provost, Magistrates, and Council of the Burgh of Ayr, in respect of the Burgh of Ayr.	
	Bognor Electric Lighting Order 1890 Provisional Order granted by the Board of Trade, under the Electric Lighting Acts, 1882 and 1888, to the Electric Trust Limited. In respect of the Local Board District of Bognor, in the County of Sussex.	
	Eastbourne Electric Supply Order 1890 Provisional Order granted by the Board of Trade, under the Electric Lighting Acts, 1882 and 1888, to the Eastbourne Electric Light Company Limited, in respect of the Borough of Eastbourne, in the County of Sussex.	
	Galway Electric Lighting Order 1890 Provisional Order granted by the Board of Trade, under the Electric Lighting Acts, 1882 and 1888, to John Perry, James Perry, and James Edward Pearce, trading as the Galway Electric Company, in respect of the Town of Galway.	
	Stafford Electric Lighting Order 1890 Provisional Order granted by the Board of Trade, under the Electric Lighting Acts, 1882 and 1888, to the Mayor, Aldermen, and Burgesses of the Borough of Stafford, in respect of the Borough of Stafford, in the County of Stafford.	
	Tiverton Electric Lighting Order 1890 Provisional Order granted by the Board of Trade, under the Electric Lighting Acts, 1882 and 1888, to the Mayor, Aldermen, and Burgesses of the Borough of Tiverton, in respect of the Borough of Tiverton in the County of Devon.	
Electric Lighting Orders Confirmation (No. 9) Act 1890	53 & 54 Vict. c. cxciv	4 August 1890
An Act to confirm certain Provisional Orders made by the Board of Trade under the Electric Lighting Acts, 1882 and 1888, relating to Lambeth, North London, St. James', Westminster, St. George the Martyr, Southwark, and a portion of the parish of Camberwell, and Wandsworth district.
	Lambeth Electric Supply Order 1890 Provisional Order granted by the Board of Trade, under the Electric Lighting Acts, 1882 and 1888, to the House-to-House Electric Light Supply Company, Limited, in respect of the parish of St. Mary, Lambeth.	
	North London Electric Supply Order 1890 Provisional Order granted by the Board of Trade, under the Electric Lighting Acts, 1882 and 1888, to the House-to-House Electric Light Supply Company, Limited, in respect of the parish of Islington.	
	St. James' Electric Lighting Order 1890 Provisional Order granted by the Board of Trade, under the Electric Lighting Acts, 1882 and 1888, to the St. James' and Pall Mall Electric Light Company, Limited, in respect of the Parish of St. James', Westminster.	
	London Electric Supply Corporation Electric Lighting (Metropolitan) Order 1890 Provisional Order granted by the Board of Trade, under the Electric Lighting Acts, 1882 and 1888, to the London Electric Supply Corporation, Limited, to supply energy for all public and private purposes in the parish of St. George-the-Martyr, Southwark, and a portion of the parish of Camberwell.	
	Wandsworth District Electric Supply Order 1890 Provisional Order granted by the Board of Trade, under the Electric Lighting Acts, 1882 and 1888, to the House-to-House Electric Light Supply Company, Limited, in respect of the district of the Wandsworth District Board of Works.	
Electric Lighting Orders Confirmation (No. 13) Act 1890	53 & 54 Vict. c. cxcv	4 August 1890
An Act to confirm certain Provisional Orders made by the Board of Trade under the Electric Lighting Acts, 1882 and 1888, relating to Preston, and Preston and Fulwood.
	Preston Electric Lighting Order 1890 Provisional Order granted by the Board of Trade, under the Electric Lighting Acts, 1882 and 1888, to the National Electric Supply Company, Limited, in respect of a part of the Borough of Preston.	
	Preston and Fulwood Electric Lighting Order 1890 Provisional Order granted by the Board of Trade, under the Electric Lighting Acts, 1882 and 1888, to the Lancashire and Cheshire House-to-House Electricity Company, Limited, in respect of the county borough of Preston, and the Fulwood Local Board District, in the County of Lancaster.	
Electric Lighting Orders Confirmation (No. 10) Act 1890	53 & 54 Vict. c. cxcvi	14 August 1890
An Act to confirm certain Provisional Orders made by the Board of Trade under the Electric Lighting Acts, 1882 and 1888, relating to Ashton-under-Lyne, Bournemouth, Coatbridge, Hastings, Northampton, and Windsor.
	Ashton-under-Lyne Electric Light and Power Order 1890 Provisional Order granted by the Board of Trade, under the Electric Lighting Acts, 1882 and 1888, to the Municipal Electric Light and Power Corporation Limited.	
	Bournemouth Electric Supply (Brush) Order 1890 Provisional Order granted by the Board of Trade, under the Electric Lighting Acts, 1882 and 1888, to the Brush Electrical Engineering Company Limited.	
	Coatbridge Electric Supply Order 1890 Provisional Order granted by the Board of Trade, under the Electric Lighting Acts, 1882 and 1888, to the Scottish House-to-House Electricity Company Limited.	
	Hastings (Public Purposes) Electric Lighting Order 1890 Provisional Order granted by the Board of Trade, under the Electric Lighting Acts, 1882 and 1888, to the Mayor Aldermen and Burgesses of the Borough of Hastings.	
	Northampton Electric Lighting Order 1890 Provisional Order granted by the Board of Trade, under the Electric Lighting Acts, 1882 and 1888, to the Northampton Electric Light and Power Company Limited.	
	Windsor Electric Supply Order 1890 Provisional Order granted by the Board of Trade, under the Electric Lighting Acts, 1882 and 1888, to the Windsor and Eton Electric Light Company Limited.	
Electric Lighting Orders Confirmation (No. 11) Act 1890	53 & 54 Vict. c. cxcvii	14 August 1890
An Act to confirm certain Provisional Orders made by the Board of Trade under the Electric Lighting Acts, 1882 and 1888, relating to Chatham, Rochester and District, Manchester, Plymouth, and Wrexham.
	Chatham, Rochester and District Electric Lighting Order 1890 Provisional Order granted by the Board of Trade, under the Electric Lighting Acts, 1882 and 1888, to the Chatham, Rochester and District Electric Lighting Company, Limited.	
	Manchester Electric Lighting Order 1890 Provisional Order granted by the Board of Trade, under the Electric Lighting Acts, 1882 and 1888, to the Mayor, Aldermen, and Citizens of the City of Manchester.	
	Plymouth Electric Lighting Order 1890 Provisional Order granted by the Board of Trade, under the Electric Lighting Acts, 1882 and 1888, to the Devon and Cornwall Electricity Supply Company, Limited.	
	Wrexham Electric Light and Power Order 1890 Provisional Order granted by the Board of Trade, under the Electric Lighting Acts, 1882 and 1888, to the Wrexham and District Electric Supply Company, Limited.	
Electric Lighting Orders Confirmation (No. 12) Act 1890	53 & 54 Vict. c. cxcviii	14 August 1890
An Act to confirm certain Provisional Orders made by the Board of Trade under the Electric Lighting Acts, 1882 and 1888, relating to Crystal Palace and District, and Paddington.
	Crystal Palace and District Electric Lighting Order 1890 Provisional Order granted by the Board of Trade, under the Electric Lighting Acts, 1882 and 1888, to the Electric Installation and Maintenance Company, Limited, in respect of the Crystal Palace District.	
	Metropolitan Electric Supply Company (Paddington) Lighting Order 1890 Provisional Order granted by the Board of Trade, under the Electric Lighting Acts, 1882 and 1888, to the Metropolitan Electric Supply Company, Limited in respect of the parish of Paddington.	
Electric Lighting Orders Confirmation (No. 14) Act 1890	53 & 54 Vict. c. cxcix	14 August 1890
An Act to confirm certain Provisional Orders made by the Board of Trade under the Electric Lighting Acts, 1882 and 1888, relating to Aberdeen, Dundee, Glasgow, Kelvinside, and Moss Side and Stretford.
	Aberdeen Electric Lighting Order 1890 Provisional Order granted by the Board of Trade, under the Electric Lighting Acts, 1882 and 1888, to the Lord Provost, Magistrates, and Town Council of the City and Royal Burgh of Aberdeen.	
	Dundee Electric Lighting Order 1890 Provisional Order granted by the Board of Trade, under the Electric Lighting Acts, 1882 and 1888, to the Dundee Gas Commissioners in respect of Dundee.	
	Glasgow Corporation Electric Lighting Order 1890 Provisional Order granted by the Board of Trade, under the Electric Lighting Acts, 1882 and 1888, to the Lord Provost, Magistrates, and Town Council of the City and Royal Burgh of Glasgow.	
	Kelvinside Electric Lighting Order 1890 Provisional Order granted by the Board of Trade, under the Electric Lighting Acts, 1882 and 1888, to the Kelvinside Electricity Company, Limited.	
	Moss Side and Stretford Electric Lighting Order 1890 Provisional Order granted by the Board of Trade, under the Electric Lighting Acts, 1882 and 1888, to the Manchester House-to-House Electricity Company, Limited.	
Regent's Canal, City and Docks Railway (Extension of Time, &c.) Act 1890	53 & 54 Vict. c. cc	14 August 1890
An Act to revive the powers and further extend the time for the compulsory purchase of lands for and to further extend the time for the completion of the works authorised by the Regent's Canal City and Docks Railway Act 1882 (Note: Regent's Canal, City, and Docks Railway Act 1882 (45 & 46 Vict. c. cclxii)) and for other purposes.
Cleveland Extension Mineral Railway Act 1890	53 & 54 Vict. c. cci	14 August 1890
An Act to revive and extend the Powers of the Cleveland Extension Mineral Railway Company.
Local Government Board's Provisional Orders Confirmation (No. 13) Act 1890	53 & 54 Vict. c. ccii	14 August 1890
An Act to confirm certain Provisional Orders of the Local Government Board relating to the City of Coventry and the Borough of Great Yarmouth.
	City of Coventry Order 1890 Provisional Order made in pursuance of Sections 54 and 59 of the Local Government Act, 1888. (Note: Local Government Act 1888 (51 & 52 Vict. c. 41))	
	Borough of Great Yarmouth Order 1890 Provisional Order made in pursuance of Sections 54 and 59 of the Local Government Act, 1888.	
Local Government Board's Provisional Order Confirmation (No. 14) Act 1890	53 & 54 Vict. c. cciii	14 August 1890
An Act to confirm a Provisional Order of the Local Government Board relating to the Borough of Kingston-upon-Hull.
	Kingston-upon-Hull Order 1890 Provisional Order for altering the Hull Corporation Loans Act, 1881, (Note: Hull Corporation Loans Act 1881 (44 & 45 Vict. c. xciv)) and a Confirming Act. (Note: Local Government Board's Provisional Order Confirmation (No. 11) Act 1888 (51 & 52 Vict. c. cxxxi))	
Local Government Board's Provisional Orders Confirmation (No. 15) Act 1890	53 & 54 Vict. c. cciv	14 August 1890
An Act to confirm certain Provisional Orders of the Local Government Board relating to the Boroughs of Grimsby and Huddersfield.
	Borough of Grimsby Order 1890 Provisional Order made in pursuance of Sections 54 and 59 of the Local Government Act, 1888.	
	Borough of Huddersfield Order 1890 Provisional Order made in pursuance of Sections 54 and 59 of the Local Government Act, 1888.	
Westminster (Parliament Street, &c.) Improvements Act 1890	53 & 54 Vict. c. ccv	14 August 1890
An Act for amending the Westminster (Parliament Street &c.) Improvements Act 1887 (Note: Westminster (Parliament Street, &c.) Improvements Act 1887 (50 & 51 Vict. c. clxxxiv)) and to extend the periods limited by that Act for the compulsory purchase of Lands for and for the completion of the Works thereby authorised.
Gas Orders Confirmation (No. 1) Act 1890	53 & 54 Vict. c. ccvi	14 August 1890
An Act to confirm certain Provisional Orders made by the Board of Trade under the Gas and Water Works Facilities Act, 1870, relating to Alton (Hants) Gas, Hoylake and West Kirby Gas, Sheffield Gas, Tonbridge Gas, and York Town and Blackwater Gas.
	Alton (Hants) Gas Order 1890 Order empowering the Alton Gas and Coke Company to maintain and continue Gasworks and to make and supply Gas in the Town and Parish of Alton in the county of Southampton.	
	Hoylake and West Kirby Gas Order 1890 Order empowering the Hoylake and West Kirby Gas and Water Company (Limited) to raise additional capital for the purposes of their gas undertaking.	
	Sheffield Gas Order 1890 Order empowering the Sheffield United Gaslight Company to construct additional works and for other purposes.	
	Tonbridge Gas Order 1890 Order empowering the Tonbridge Gas Company to raise additional capital to construct and maintain additional works and for other purposes.	
	York Town and Blackwater Gas Order 1890 Order empowering the York Town and Blackwater Gas and Coke Company (Limited) to maintain and continue gasworks, and to manufacture and supply gas within part of the parish of Frimley, in the county of Surrey, and parts of the parishes of Hawley and Yately, in the county of Southampton.	
Pilotage Order Confirmation (No. 1) Act 1890	53 & 54 Vict. c. ccvii	14 August 1890
An Act to confirm a Provisional Order made by the Board of Trade under the Merchant Shipping (Pilotage) Act, 1889, (Note: Merchant Shipping (Pilotage) Act 1889 (52 & 53 Vict. c. 68)) relating to Clyde.
	Clyde Pilotage Order 1890 Order providing for the Representation of Pilots on the Clyde Pilot Board.	
Pilotage Order Confirmation (No. 2) Act 1890 (repealed)	53 & 54 Vict. c. ccviii	14 August 1890
An Act to confirm a Provisional Order made by the Board of Trade under the Merchant Shipping (Pilotage) Act, 1889, relating to Bristol. (Repealed by Pilotage Orders Confirmation (No. 5) Act 1921 (11 & 12 Geo. 5. c. cxii))
	Bristol Pilotage Order 1890 Order providing for the Representation of Pilots and Shipowners on the Pilotage Committee of the Corporation of Bristol.	
Aldershot Roads Act 1890	53 & 54 Vict. c. ccix	14 August 1890
An Act to make better provision for the safety of the Public when the lands in or near Aldershot vested in the Secretary of State for the War Department are used for Rifle Ranges or other Military purposes.
Tramways Order in Council (Ireland) South Clare Railways Confirmation Act 1890	53 & 54 Vict. c. ccx	14 August 1890
An Act to confirm an Order in Council of the Lord Lieutenant and Privy Council in Ireland relating to the South Clare Railways.
	South Clare Railways Order 1890 The South Clare Railways Order, 1890.	
Plymouth Corporation Act 1890 (repealed)	53 & 54 Vict. c. ccxi	14 August 1890
An Act to confer powers on the Corporation of Plymouth for the acquisition of the Fish Market works and undertaking authorised by the Sutton Harbour Act 1889 (Note: Sutton Harbour Act 1889 (52 & 53 Vict. c. cxcii)) and for other purposes. (Repealed by Plymouth Corporation Act 1915 (5 & 6 Geo. 5. c. lxix))
Cheltenham Station Act 1890	53 & 54 Vict. c. ccxii	14 August 1890
An Act to authorise the Construction of a New Station at Cheltenham in the county of Gloucester and for other purposes.
South Yorkshire Junction Railway Act 1890	53 & 54 Vict. c. ccxiii	14 August 1890
An Act to authorise the construction of Railways in the West Riding of the County of York from Wrangbrook to Black Carr Junction with a Branch to Denaby and for other purposes.
Wellingborough and District Tramroads Act 1890	53 & 54 Vict. c. ccxiv	14 August 1890
An Act for conferring further powers on the Wellingborough and District Tramroads Company and for other purposes.
Atlas Steamship Company Act 1890	53 & 54 Vict. c. ccxv	14 August 1890
An Act for enabling the Atlas Steamship Company Limited to divide their fully paid up Share Capital and for other purposes.
Borneo Company Act 1890	53 & 54 Vict. c. ccxvi	14 August 1890
An Act to cancel the Deed of Settlement of the Borneo Company Limited and to substitute Memorandum and Articles of Association and for other purposes.
Sutton, Southcoates and Drypool Gas (Electric Lighting) Act 1890 (repealed)	53 & 54 Vict. c. ccxvii	14 August 1890
An Act to authorise the Sutton Southcoates and Drypool Gas Company to accept from the Mayor Aldermen and Burgesses of the Borough of Kingston-upon-Hull a transfer of some of the powers contained in the Kingston-upon-Hull Electric Lighting Order 1890. (Repealed by East Hull Gas Act 1933 (c.lxxxv))
Bexley Heath Railway Act 1890	53 & 54 Vict. c. ccxviii	14 August 1890
An Act to extend the time for the purchase of land for and completion of the Bexley Heath Railway and for other purposes.
Bootle Corporation Act 1890 (repealed)	53 & 54 Vict. c. ccxix	14 August 1890
An Act to alter the name of the borough of Bootle-cum-Linacre to improve the borough boundary and to make better provision for the health local government and improvement of the borough and for other purposes. (Repealed by County of Merseyside Act 1980 (c. x))
United States and South American Investment Trust Company Limited Act 1890 or the United States and South American Investment Trust Company Act 1890	53 & 54 Vict. c. ccxx	14 August 1890
An Act for the alteration and amendment of the Memorandum of Association of the United States and South American Investment Trust Company Limited with reference to the investment of funds and for other purposes.
Glasgow Police (Amendment) Act 1890 (repealed)	53 & 54 Vict. c. ccxxi	14 August 1890
An Act to confer further Sanitary Powers on the Magistrates and Council of the City and Royal Burgh of Glasgow as the Police Commissioners thereof and for other purposes. (Repealed by Statute Law (Repeals) Act 1995 (c. 44))
Hull and North Western Junction Railway Act 1890 (repealed)	53 & 54 Vict. c. ccxxii	14 August 1890
An Act to empower the Hull and North Western Junction Railway Company to deviate certain parts of the Railways Nos. 1 and 1C authorised by the Hull Barnsley and West Riding Junction Railway and Dock (New Works) Act 1882 (Note: Hull Barnsley and West Riding Junction Railway and Dock (New Works) Act 1882 (45 & 46 Vict. c. ccxlvi)) to revive the powers and extend the time for the purchase of Lands for and to extend the time for the completion of the remainder of the said Railways Nos. 1 and 1C and the Railway No. 1A authorised by the said Act of 1882 and for other purposes. (Repealed by Hull and North Western Junction Railway (Abandonment) Act 1894 (57 & 58 Vict. c. xiii))
Oxford Corporation Act 1890 (repealed)	53 & 54 Vict. c. ccxxiii	14 August 1890
An Act to enable the Mayor Aldermen and Citizens of Oxford to acquire the Church of Saint Martin in the said City to make new Streets and Street Improvements to create and issue Corporation Stock and to make further provision for the improvement and good government of the City and for other purposes. (Repealed by Oxfordshire Act 1985 (c. xxxiv))
Richmond Footbridge Sluices, Lock and Slipway Act 1890 (repealed)	53 & 54 Vict. c. ccxxiv	14 August 1890
An Act to authorise the construction of a Footbridge with removable Sluices and a Lock and Slipway on the River Thames in the parishes of Richmond and Isleworth and for other purposes. (Repealed by Port of London Act 1968 (c. xxxii))
Sheffield Corporation Act 1890 (repealed)	53 & 54 Vict. c. ccxxv	14 August 1890
An Act to make further and better provision for the improvement health and good government of the County Borough of Sheffield and for other purposes. (Repealed by Sheffield Corporation (Consolidation) Act 1918 (8 & 9 Geo. 5. c. lxi))
Compagnie Générale des Asphaltes de France (Limited) Act 1890	53 & 54 Vict. c. ccxxvi	14 August 1890
An Act to extend and vary the Memorandum of Association of the Compagnie Générale des Asphaltes de France (Limited) and for other purposes.
Manchester Ship Canal (Various Powers) Act 1890	53 & 54 Vict. c. ccxxvii	14 August 1890
An Act to confer further powers upon the Manchester Ship Canal Company and for other purposes.
North West Central Railway Act 1890	53 & 54 Vict. c. ccxxviii	14 August 1890
An Act for the making and maintaining of the North West Central Railway and for other purposes.
Ocean Accident and Guarantee Company Limited Act 1890 or the Ocean Accident and Guarantee Company Act 1890	53 & 54 Vict. c. ccxxix	14 August 1890
An Act for the Amalgamation of the Ocean Railway and General Accident Assurance Company Limited and the Ocean and General Guarantee Company Limited and to confer certain powers on the Amalgamated Company.
South Lincolnshire Fen Water Act 1890 (repealed)	53 & 54 Vict. c. ccxxx	14 August 1890
An Act to authorise the transfer to the South Lincolnshire Fen Water Company of the Undertaking of the Spalding Waterworks Company and for other purposes. (Repealed by Spalding Water Act 1900 (c.cvii))
Bradford Corporation Waterworks Act 1890	53 & 54 Vict. c. ccxxxi	14 August 1890
An Act for enabling the Mayor Aldermen and Burgesses of the Borough of Bradford in the West Riding of the County of York to construct and maintain additional Waterworks and for other purposes connected therewith.
East Stonehouse Local Board Act 1890 (repealed)	53 & 54 Vict. c. ccxxxii	14 August 1890
An Act for the settlement of certain Claims arising out of the Fraudulent issue of certain Mortgages purporting to be Mortgages of the Local Board for the District of East Stonehouse and for the borrowing of Money by the Local Board and for other purposes. (Repealed by Plymouth Corporation Act 1915 (c.lxix))
Garve and Ullapool Railway Act 1890	53 & 54 Vict. c. ccxxxiii	14 August 1890
An Act to authorise the Construction of a Railway from Garve to Ullapool and for other purposes.
Great North of Scotland Railway Act 1890	53 & 54 Vict. c. ccxxxiv	14 August 1890
An Act to authorise the Great North of Scotland Railway Company to acquire additional lands and for other purposes.
Tunbridge Wells Improvement Act 1890 (repealed)	53 & 54 Vict. c. ccxxxv	14 August 1890
An Act to make further and better Provision for the Improvement Health and good Government of the Borough of Tunbridge Wells to provide for the issue of Corporation Stock to amend the Tunbridge Wells Improvement Act 1846 (Note: Tunbridge Wells Improvement Act 1846 (9 & 10 Vict. c. cccxlix)) and the Tunbridge Wells Water Act 1865 (Note: Tunbridge Wells Water Act 1865 (28 & 29 Vict. c. cciv)) and for other purposes. (Repealed by County of Kent Act 1981 (c. xviii))
Warrington Extension and Water Act 1890	53 & 54 Vict. c. ccxxxvi	14 August 1890
An Act to extend the Boundaries of the Borough of Warrington to provide for vesting the Undertaking of the Warrington Waterworks Company in the Mayor Aldermen and Burgesses of the Borough of Warrington and for other purposes.
Local Government Board's Provisional Orders Confirmation (No. 11) Act 1890 (repealed)	53 & 54 Vict. c. ccxxxvii	18 August 1890
An Act to confirm certain Provisional Orders of the Local Government Board relating to the Boroughs of Leamington and Tamworth. (Repealed by Statute Law (Repeals) Act 1995 (c. 44))
	Borough of Leamington Order 1890 Provisional Order made in pursuance of Sections 54 and 59 of the Local Government Act, 1888.	
	Borough of Tamworth Order 1890 Provisional Order made in pursuance of Sections 54 and 59 of the Local Government Act, 1888.	
Local Government Board's Provisional Order Confirmation (No. 16) Act 1890	53 & 54 Vict. c. ccxxxviii	18 August 1890
An Act to a Provisional Order of the Local Government Board relating to the City of Manchester.
	City of Manchester Order 1890 Provisional Order made in pursuance of Sections 54 and 59 of the Local Government Act, 1888.	
Electric Lighting Orders Confirmation (No. 15) Act 1890	53 & 54 Vict. c. ccxxxix	18 August 1890
An Act to confirm certain Provisional Orders made by the Board of Trade under the Electric Lighting Acts, 1882 and 1888, relating to the City of London.
	City of London Electric Lighting (Brush) Order 1890 Provisional Order granted by the Board of Trade, under the Electric Lighting Acts, 1882 and 1888, to the Brush Electrical Engineering Company, Limited, in respect of a portion of the City of London.	
	City of London (East District) Electric Lighting Order 1890 Provisional Order granted by the Board of Trade, under the Electric Lighting Acts, 1882 and 1888, to the Laing, Wharton, and Down Construction Syndicate, Limited, in respect of a portion of the City of London.	
Terrington and Walpole Tramroads Act 1890	53 & 54 Vict. c. ccxl	18 August 1890
An Act for authorising the Terrington and Walpole Tramroad Company to extend their Tramroad to Wisbech and for other purposes.
Airdrie and Coatbridge Waterworks Amendment Act 1890 (repealed)	53 & 54 Vict. c. ccxli	18 August 1890
An Act for conferring further powers on the Airdrie and Coatbridge Water Company and for other purposes. (Repealed by Airdrie, Coatbridge and District Water Board Order Confirmation Act 1923 (13 & 14 Geo. 5. c. li))
Cork and Fermoy and Waterford and Wexford Railway Act 1890 (repealed)	53 & 54 Vict. c. ccxlii	18 August 1890
An Act for making Railways between Cork and Fermoy in the County of Cork and between Waterford and Wexford in the Counties of Waterford Kilkenny and Wexford and for other purposes. (Repealed by Statute Law (Repeals) Act 2013 (c. 2))
London Council (General Powers) Act 1890	53 & 54 Vict. c. ccxliii	18 August 1890
An Act to confer further powers on the London County Council for the acquisition and maintenance of Parks and Open Spaces and as to Local management and procedure and to make various provisions with regard to Buildings and Streets in the Administrative County of London.
Tottenham Local Board Act 1890	53 & 54 Vict. c. ccxliv	18 August 1890
An Act to confer powers on the Tottenham Local Board of Health with regard to local government within their District.
Lynton Railway Act 1890 (repealed)	53 & 54 Vict. c. ccxlv	18 August 1890
An Act for conferring further powers on the Lynton Railway Company and for other purposes. (Repealed by Statute Law (Repeals) Act 2013 (c. 2))
Dublin Corporation Act 1890	53 & 54 Vict. c. ccxlvi	18 August 1890
An Act to amend the Dublin Improvement Acts 1849 to 1864 and to make further and better provisions in relation to Buildings Streets Sanitary Matters and Collection of Rates in the City of Dublin and for other purposes.
London Streets (Removal of Gates) Act 1890 (repealed)	53 & 54 Vict. c. ccxlvii	18 August 1890
An Act to provide for the Removal of certain Restrictions upon Traffic in certain Streets of London. (Repealed by Local Law (Greater London Council and Inner London Boroughs) Order 1965 (SI 1965/540))

=== Private and personal acts ===
Short title	Citation	Royal assent
Long title
Martin's Naturalization Act 1890 (Note: This act was not printed by the Queen's Printer.)	53 & 54 Vict. c. 1 Pr.	25 July 1890
An Act to naturalize Maria Matilde Petrona de Francisco Martin, Widow.
Pohl's Naturalization Act 1890	53 & 54 Vict. c. 2 Pr.	25 July 1890
An Act to naturalize Ernest Edward Pohl.

=== Sources ===
- The Public General Statutes, Volume 27: 53 & 54 Victoria – 1890 – via HathiTrust.
- The Public General Statutes, Volume 27: 53 & 54 Victoria – 1890 – via Google Books.
- Journal of the House of Commons. Vol. 145. London: His Majesty's Stationery Office. pp. 3–588.
- Chronological Table of and Index to the Statutes. Vol. 1: To the End of the Session 59 Vict. Sess. 2 (1895) (13th ed.). London: Her Majesty's Stationery Office. 1896. pp. 526–528 – via Google Books.

== 54 & 55 Vict. ==
The sixth session of the 24th Parliament of the United Kingdom, which met from 25 November 1890 until 5 August 1891.

=== Public general acts ===
Short title	Citation	Royal assent
Long title
Seed Potatoes Supply (Ireland) Act 1890 (repealed)	54 & 55 Vict. c. 1	9 December 1890
An Act to provide for the Supply of Seed Potatoes to Occupiers and Cultivators of Land in Ireland. (Repealed by Statute Law Revision Act 1908 (8 Edw. 7. c. 49))
Transfer of Railways (Ireland) Act 1890	54 & 55 Vict. c. 2	9 December 1890
An Act to authorise the Transfer of the Powers of Promoters of Railway and Tramway Undertakings, under the Tramways (Ireland) Acts, to certain existing Railway Companies, and for other purposes.

=== Sources ===
- The Public General Statutes, Volume 28: 54 & 55 Victoria – 1891 – via Internet Archive.

== See also ==
- List of acts of the Parliament of the United Kingdom
