= Woking power station =

Former coal-fired power station

- Country: England
- Location: Woking
- Coordinates: 51°19′26″N 00°33′01″W
- Status: Decommissioned
- Construction began: 1889
- Commission date: 1890
- Decommission date: 1960
- Owners: Woking Electricity Supply Company Limited (1890–1895); Woking Electric Supply Company Limited (1895–1948); British Electricity Authority (1948–1955); Central Electricity Authority (1955–1957); Central Electricity Generating Board (1958–1960)
- Operator: As owner

Thermal power station
- Primary fuel: Coal
- Turbine technology: Steam turbines
- Cooling source: Cooling tower

Power generation
- Units operational: 1 x 2.5 MW, 1 x 2 MW, 2 x 1.25 MW
- Make and model: Brush-Ljungstrom
- Nameplate capacity: 7 MW
- Annual net output: 3527 MWh (1946)

Woking power station supplied electricity to the Borough of Woking and the surrounding area from 1890 to 1960. The power station was operated by the Woking Electric Supply Company Limited until the nationalisation of the British electricity industry in 1948. It was redeveloped after the First World War to meet the increased demand for electricity.

== History ==
The Woking Electricity Supply Company obtained a provisional order in 1890 under the Electric Lighting Acts to generate and supply electricity to Borough of Woking. The Woking Electric Supply Company Order 1890 was granted by the Board of Trade and was confirmed by Parliament through the Electric Lighting Orders Confirmation (No. 5) Act 1890 (54 & 55 Vict. c. cxc). The company built a power station in Board School Road, Woking (51°19′26″N 00°33′01″W) which was commissioned in 1890.

The Woking Electric Supply Company Limited was formed on 5 December 1895 to acquire the Woking Electricity Supply Company. The company undertook a major upgrade of the plant in 1918–28.

The British electricity supply industry was nationalised in 1948 under the provisions of the Electricity Act 1947 (10 & 11 Geo. 6. c. 54). The Woking electricity undertaking was abolished, ownership of Woking power station was vested in the British Electricity Authority, and subsequently the Central Electricity Authority and the Central Electricity Generating Board (CEGB). At the same time the electricity distribution and sales responsibilities of the Woking electricity undertaking were transferred to the South Eastern Electricity Board (SEEBOARD).

Woking power station was closed in 1959–60.

== Equipment specification ==
=== Plant in 1898 ===
The generating plant in 1898 comprised Corliss Compound Engines and a Belliss and Parsons steam turbine coupled directly and by belts to Mordey and Parsons dynamos. The plant had a generating capacity of 255 kW.

=== Plant in 1919 ===
In 1919 the generating capacity at Woking power station was 2,100 kW, the maximum load on the feeders was 1,192 kW, and there was 5,950 kW of connections on the circuits.

=== Plant in 1923 ===
By 1923 the plant comprised boilers delivering 55,000 lb/h (6.93 kg/s) of steam to:

- 2 × 150 kW reciprocating engines driving alternating current (AC) alternators
- 2 × 400 kW reciprocating engines AC alternators
- 2 × 1,000 kW steam turbo-alternator (AC)

These machines had a total generating capacity of 3,100 kW.

Electricity supply to consumers was at 200 V AC.

=== Plant in 1954 ===
By 1954 the plant comprised:

- Boilers:
  - 2 × Babcock and Wilcox 25,000 lb/h (3.15 kg/s) chain grate stoker boilers, steam conditions were 175 psi and 680 °F (12.1 bar and 360 °C),
  - 1 × Babcock and Wilcox 15,000 lb/h (1.9 kg/s) chain grate stoker boiler, steam conditions as above, steam was supplied to:
- Generators:
  - 1 × 2.5 MW Brush-Ljungstrom 2 kV single phase turbo-alternator
  - 1 × 2.0 MW Brush-Ljungstrom 2 kV single phase turbo-alternator
  - 2 × 1.25 MW Brush-Ljungstrom 2 kV single phase turbo-alternators

The total generating capacity was 7 MW.

Condenser water was cooled in a Premier cooling tower with a capacity of 0.24 million gallons per hour (1,091 m^{3}/hour).

== Operations ==
=== Operating data 1898 ===
The 1898 generating plant had a capacity of 484 kW and a maximum load was 125 kW .

=== Operating date 1919 ===
In 1919 the amount of electricity generated was 2,243 MWh, the total sold was 1,847 MWh to 2,317 customers.

=== Operating data 1921–23 ===
The electricity supply data for the period 1921–23 was:

Woking power station supply data 1921–23
Electricity Use	Units	Year		
Electricity Use	Units	1921	1922	1923
Lighting and domestic	MWh	1,412	1,469	1,603
Public lighting	MWh	0	0	0
Traction	MWh	0	0	0
Power	MWh	828	659	668
Bulk supply	MWh	0	0	0
Total use	MWh	2,240	2,128	2,271

The electricity Loads on the system were:

Year		1921	1922	1923
Maximum load	kW	1,337	1,526	1,395
Total connections	kW	5,929	6,100	7,123
Load factor	Per cent	23.6	19.5	22.7

Revenue from the sale of current (in 1923) was £45,507; the surplus of revenue over expenses was £27,283.

=== Operating data 1931–36 ===
In 1931 Woking power station generated 9,663 MWh and sold a total of 7,912 MWh. Woking Electric Supply Company Limited supplied electricity to Woking, Chertsey, Bisley, Byfleet, Pyrford, Ockham, Pirbight, Send, Ripley, Wisley, Littleton, Shepperton and Laleham.

In 1933 the company sold 9,826 MWh; in 1934 11,512 MWh; and in 1935 13,597 MWh. In 1936 no electricity was generated by Woking, the undertaking purchased its supply which amounted to 18,989 MWh. In that year there was a load of 33,059 kW connected to the system. There were 15,764 customers.

=== Operating data 1946 ===
In 1946 Woking power station supplied 3,527 MWh of electricity; the maximum output load was 5,443 kW.

=== Operating data 1954–58 ===
Operating data for the period 1954–58 was:

Woking power station operating data, 1954–58
Year	Running hours	Max output capacity, MW	Electricity supplied, MWh	Thermal efficiency per cent
1954	307	4	888	6.28
1955	166	4	169	2.23
1956	196	2	472	9.86
1957	80	2	59	3.27
1958	73	2	62	5.03

Electricity sold by the Woking Electric Supply Company Limited in MWh

== Woking Electricity District ==
Following nationalisation in 1948 Woking power station became part of the Woking electricity supply district, covering 69 square miles (179 km^{2}) with a population of 110,090 in 1958. The number of consumers and electricity sold in the Woking district was:

Year	1956	1957	1958
Number of consumers	33,367	34,822	36,033
Electricity sold MWh	126,164	139,814	152,414

In 1958 the number of units sold to categories of consumers was:

Type of consumer	No. of consumers	Electricity sold MWh
Domestic	32,444	71,882
Commercial	2,885	16,754
Industrial	517	61,018
Farms	179	1,942
Public lighting	8	818
Total	36,033	152,414

== See also ==
- Timeline of the UK electricity supply industry
- List of power stations in England
