= List of acts of the Parliament of the United Kingdom from 1891 =

This is a complete list of acts of the Parliament of the United Kingdom for the year 1891.

Note that the first parliament of the United Kingdom was held in 1801; parliaments between 1707 and 1800 were either parliaments of Great Britain or of Ireland). For acts passed up until 1707, see the list of acts of the Parliament of England and the list of acts of the Parliament of Scotland. For acts passed from 1707 to 1800, see the list of acts of the Parliament of Great Britain. See also the list of acts of the Parliament of Ireland.

For acts of the devolved parliaments and assemblies in the United Kingdom, see the list of acts of the Scottish Parliament, the list of acts of the Northern Ireland Assembly, and the list of acts and measures of Senedd Cymru; see also the list of acts of the Parliament of Northern Ireland.

The number shown after each act's title is its chapter number. Acts passed before 1963 are cited using this number, preceded by the year(s) of the reign during which the relevant parliamentary session was held; thus the Union with Ireland Act 1800 is cited as "39 & 40 Geo. 3 c. 67", meaning the 67th act passed during the session that started in the 39th year of the reign of George III and which finished in the 40th year of that reign. Note that the modern convention is to use Arabic numerals in citations (thus "41 Geo. 3" rather than "41 Geo. III"). Acts of the last session of the Parliament of Great Britain and the first session of the Parliament of the United Kingdom are both cited as "41 Geo. 3". Acts passed from 1963 onwards are simply cited by calendar year and chapter number.

All modern acts have a short title, e.g. the Local Government Act 2003. Some earlier acts also have a short title given to them by later acts, such as by the Short Titles Act 1896.

== 54 & 55 Vict. ==
Continuing the sixth session of the 24th Parliament of the United Kingdom, which met from 25 November 1890 until 5 August 1891.

=== Public general acts ===
Short title	Citation	Royal assent
Long title
Custody of Children Act 1891 (repealed)	54 & 55 Vict. c. 3	26 March 1891
An Act to amend the Law relating to the Custody of Children. (Repealed by Children Act 1989 (c. 41))
Technical Instruction Act 1891 (repealed)	54 & 55 Vict. c. 4	26 March 1891
An Act to amend the Law relating to Technical Instruction. (Repealed for England and Wales by Education Act 1902 (2 Edw. 7. c. 42) and Education (London) Act 1903 (3 Edw. 7. c. 24) and for Northern Ireland by Education Act (Northern Ireland) 1923 (13 & 14 Geo. 5. c. 21 (N.I.)))
Army (Annual) Act 1891 (repealed)	54 & 55 Vict. c. 5	26 March 1891
An Act to provide, during twelve months, for the Discipline and Regulation of the Army. (Repealed by Statute Law Revision Act 1908 (8 Edw. 7. c. 49), Statute Law Revision Act 1950 (14 Geo. 6. c. 6) and Revision of the Army and Air Force Acts (Transitional Provisions) Act 1955 (3 & 4 Eliz. 2. c. 20))
Consolidated Fund (No. 1) Act 1891 (repealed)	54 & 55 Vict. c. 6	26 March 1891
An Act to apply certain sums out of the Consolidated Fund to the service of the years ending on the thirty-first day of March one thousand eight hundred and ninety, one thousand eight hundred and ninety-one, and one thousand eight hundred and ninety-two. (Repealed by Statute Law Revision Act 1908 (8 Edw. 7. c. 49))
Seed Potatoes Supply (Ireland) Act 1891 (repealed)	54 & 55 Vict. c. 7	26 March 1891
An Act to amend the Seed Potatoes Supply (Ireland) Act, 1890. (Note: Seed Potatoes Supply (Ireland) Act 1890 (54 & 55 Vict. c. 1)) (Repealed by Statute Law Revision Act 1908 (8 Edw. 7. c. 49))
Tithe Act 1891 (repealed)	54 & 55 Vict. c. 8	26 March 1891
An Act to make better provision for the Recovery of Tithe Rentcharge in England and Wales. (Repealed by Statute Law (Repeals) Act 1993 (c. 50))
Registration of Certain Writs (Scotland) Act 1891 (repealed)	54 & 55 Vict. c. 9	11 May 1891
An Act to make provisions in regard to the registration of certain writs in the divisions of the General Register of Sasines for Scotland. (Repealed by Abolition of Feudal Tenure etc. (Scotland) Act 2000 (asp 5))
Middlesex Registry Act 1891 (repealed)	54 & 55 Vict. c. 10	11 May 1891
An Act to make temporary Provision for the business of the Middlesex Registry of Deeds. (Repealed by Administration of Justice Act 1965 (c. 2))
Electoral Disabilities Removal Act 1891 (repealed)	54 & 55 Vict. c. 11	11 May 1891
An Act to remove certain Disabilities of Persons by reason of absence to be registered as Voters at Parliamentary and Local Elections. (Repealed by Representation of the People Act 1918 (7 & 8 Geo. 5. c. 64))
Railway and Canal Traffic (Provisional Orders) Amendment Act 1891 (repealed)	54 & 55 Vict. c. 12	11 May 1891
An Act to remove doubts as to the Powers of Public Bodies in reference to Provisional Order Bills under the Railway and Canal Traffic Act, 1888. (Note: Railway and Canal Traffic Act 1888 (51 & 52 Vict. c. 25)) (Repealed by Statute Law Revision Act 1959 (7 & 8 Eliz. 2. c. 68))
Taxes (Regulation of Remuneration) Act 1891 (repealed)	54 & 55 Vict. c. 13	11 May 1891
An Act to regulate the Remuneration payable to Clerks to Commissioners of Income Tax and Inhabited House Duties, and to Assessors and Collectors thereof. (Repealed by Statute Law (Repeals) Act 1973 (c. 39))
Supreme Court of Judicature (London Causes) Act 1891 (repealed)	54 & 55 Vict. c. 14	11 May 1891
An Act to provide for the Trial of Civil Causes in the City of London. (Repealed by Administration of Justice Act 1925 (15 & 16 Geo. 5. c. 28))
Merchandise Marks Act 1891 (repealed)	54 & 55 Vict. c. 15	11 May 1891
An Act to amend the Merchandise Marks Act, 1887. (Note: Merchandise Marks Act 1887 (50 & 51 Vict. c. 28)) (Repealed by Trade Descriptions Act 1968 (c. 29))
Army Schools Act 1891	54 & 55 Vict. c. 16	11 May 1891
An Act to extend to Army Schools the benefit of certain Educational Endowments. (Repealed for Northern Ireland by Education (Northern Ireland) Order 1980 (SI 1980/1958 (N.I. 16)))
Charitable Trusts (Recovery) Act 1891 (repealed)	54 & 55 Vict. c. 17	11 May 1891
An Act to facilitate the Recovery of Rentcharges and other Payments owing to Charities. (Repealed by Charities Act 1960 (8 & 9 Eliz. 2. c. 58))
Registration of Electors Act 1891 (repealed)	54 & 55 Vict. c. 18	11 June 1891
An Act for the removing of Doubts arising under the Registration of Electors Acts. (Repealed by Representation of the People Act 1918 (7 & 8 Geo. 5. c. 64) (Note: Incorrectly cited as "Representation of the People Act 1948" in the Chronological Table of the Statutes.))
Seal Fishery (Behring's Sea) Act 1891 (repealed)	54 & 55 Vict. c. 19	11 June 1891
An Act to enable Her Majesty, by Order in Council, to make Special Provision for prohibiting the Catching of Seals in Behring’s Sea by Her Majesty’s Subjects during the Period named in the Order. (Repealed by Seal Fishery (North Pacific) Act 1893 (56 & 57 Vict. c. 23))
Pollen Fisheries (Ireland) Act 1891 (repealed)	54 & 55 Vict. c. 20	3 July 1891
An Act for the better Preservation of the Pollen Fisheries in Ireland. (Repealed by Fisheries Act (Northern Ireland) 1966 (c. 17 (N.I.)))
Savings Banks Act 1891 (repealed)	54 & 55 Vict. c. 21	3 July 1891
An Act to amend the Law relating to Savings Banks. (Repealed for the United Kingdom by Savings Banks Act 1904 (4 Edw. 7. c. 8), Statute Law Revision Act 1908 (8 Edw. 7. c. 49), Bankruptcy Act 1914 (4 & 5 Geo. 5. c. 59), Savings Banks Act 1920 (10 & 11 Geo. 5. c. 12), Post Office Savings Bank Act 1954 (2 & 3 Eliz. 2. c. 62) and Trustee Savings Banks Act 1954 (2 & 3 Eliz. 2. c. 63) and for the Isle of Man by Statute Law Revision (Isle of Man) Act 1991 (c. 61))
Museums and Gymnasiums Act 1891	54 & 55 Vict. c. 22	3 July 1891
An Act to enable Urban Authorities to provide and maintain Museums and Gymnasiums. (Repealed for England and Wales by Physical Training and Recreation Act 1937 (1 Edw. 8 & 1 Geo. 6. c. 46) and Public Libraries and Museums Act 1964 (c. 75))
Reformatory and Industrial Schools Act 1891 (repealed)	54 & 55 Vict. c. 23	3 July 1891
An Act to assist the Managers of Reformatory and Industrial Schools in advantageously launching into useful Careers the Children under their Charge. (Repealed by Children Act 1908 (8 Edw. 7. c. 67))
Public Accounts and Charges Act 1891 (repealed)	54 & 55 Vict. c. 24	3 July 1891
An Act to amend certain provisions of the Law with respect to Money charged on or payable out of the Consolidated Fund, and with respect to Public Accounts. (Repealed by Commissioners for Revenue and Customs Act 2005 (c. 11))
Customs and Inland Revenue Act 1891 (repealed)	54 & 55 Vict. c. 25	3 July 1891
An Act to grant certain Duties of Customs and Inland Revenue and to amend the Law relating to Customs and Inland Revenue. (Repealed by Revenue Act 1903 (3 Edw. 7. c. 46) and Statute Law Revision Act 1908 (8 Edw. 7. c. 49))
Russian Dutch Loan Act 1891 (repealed)	54 & 55 Vict. c. 26	3 July 1891
An Act to make provision for paying off the British portion of the Russian Dutch Loan. (Repealed by Statute Law Revision Act 1908 (8 Edw. 7. c. 49))
Consolidated Fund (No. 2) Act 1891 (repealed)	54 & 55 Vict. c. 27	3 July 1891
An Act to apply the sum of fifteen million nine hundred and thirty thousand and two pounds out of the Consolidated Fund to the service of the year ending on the thirty-first day of March one thousand eight hundred and ninety-two. (Repealed by Statute Law Revision Act 1908 (8 Edw. 7. c. 49))
Branding of Herrings (Northumberland) Act 1891 (repealed)	54 & 55 Vict. c. 28	3 July 1891
An Act to amend the Law respecting the Branding of Herrings on the Coast of Northumberland. (Repealed by Statute Law Revision Act 1963 (c. 30))
Presumption of Life Limitation (Scotland) Act 1891 (repealed)	54 & 55 Vict. c. 29	3 July 1891
An Act to amend the Law of Scotland as regards Presumption of Life. (Repealed by Presumption of Death (Scotland) Act 1977 (c. 27))
Law Agents and Notaries Public (Scotland) Act 1891 (repealed)	54 & 55 Vict. c. 30	21 July 1891
An Act to amend the Law relating to Law Agents and Notaries Public practising in Scotland. (Repealed by Solicitors (Scotland) Act 1933 (23 & 24 Geo. 5. c. 21))
Mail Ships Act 1891 (repealed)	54 & 55 Vict. c. 31	21 July 1891
An Act to enable Her Majesty in Council to carry into effect Conventions which may be made with Foreign Countries respecting Ships engaged in Postal Service. (Repealed by Statute Law Revision Act 1963 (c. 30))
Roads and Streets in Police Burghs (Scotland) Act 1891 (repealed)	54 & 55 Vict. c. 32	21 July 1891
An Act to amend the Law relating to Roads and Streets in Police Burghs in Scotland. (Repealed by Local Government (Scotland) Act 1973 (c. 65))
Allotments Rating Exemption Act 1891 (repealed)	54 & 55 Vict. c. 33	21 July 1891
An Act to amend the Laws relating to the Rating of Allotments for Sanitary purposes. (Repealed for England and Wales by Rating and Valuation Act 1925 (15 & 16 Geo. 5. c. 90) and for the Isles of Scilly by Isles of Scilly Order 1927 (SR&O 1927/59))
Local Authorities Loans (Scotland) Act 1891 (repealed)	54 & 55 Vict. c. 34	21 July 1891
An Act to provide increased Facilities for the raising of Money by Local Authorities in Scotland by the issue of Debentures, Stock, or otherwise. (Repealed by Local Government (Scotland) Act 1947 (10 & 11 Geo. 6. c. 43))
Bills of Sale Act 1891	54 & 55 Vict. c. 35	21 July 1891
An Act to amend the Bills of Sale Act, 1890. (Note: Bills of Sale Act 1890 (53 & 54 Vict. c. 53))
Consular Salaries and Fees Act 1891 (repealed)	54 & 55 Vict. c. 36	21 July 1891
An Act to amend the Law relating to the Salaries and Fees of Consular Officers. (Repealed by Consular Fees Act 1980 (c. 23))
Fisheries Act 1891 (repealed)	54 & 55 Vict. c. 37	21 July 1891
An Act to carry into effect an International Declaration respecting the North Sea Fisheries, and to amend the Law relating to Sea Fisheries and Salmon and Freshwater Fisheries. (Repealed by Deregulation Act 2015 (c. 20))
Stamp Duties Management Act 1891	54 & 55 Vict. c. 38	21 July 1891
An Act to consolidate the Law relating to the Management of Stamp Duties.
Stamp Act 1891	54 & 55 Vict. c. 39	21 July 1891
An Act to consolidate the Enactments granting and relating to the Stamp Duties upon Instruments and certain other enactments relating to Stamp Duties.
Brine Pumping (Compensation for Subsidence) Act 1891 (repealed)	54 & 55 Vict. c. 40	28 July 1891
An Act to provide Compensation for Owners of Property-suffering through the Subsidence of the Ground caused by the pumping of Brine. (Repealed by Statute Law (Repeals) Act 1995 (c. 44))
Crofters Common Grazings Regulation Act 1891	54 & 55 Vict. c. 41	28 July 1891
An Act to regulate Crofters Common Grazings in Scotland.
Tramways (Ireland) Amendment Act 1891 (repealed)	54 & 55 Vict. c. 42	28 July 1891
An Act further to amend the Tramways (Ireland) Act, 1860. (Note: Tramways (Ireland) Act 1860 (23 & 24 Vict. c. 152)) (Repealed by Public Works, etc., Loans Act (Northern Ireland) 1953 (c. 13 (N.I.)))
Forged Transfers Act 1891	54 & 55 Vict. c. 43	5 August 1891
An Act for preserving Purchasers of Stock from Losses by Forged Transfers.
Trusts (Scotland) Amendment Act 1891 (repealed)	54 & 55 Vict. c. 44	5 August 1891
An Act to amend the Law of Trusts in Scotland. (Repealed by Trusts (Scotland) Act 1921 (11 & 12 Geo. 5. c. 58))
Turbary (Ireland) Act 1891	54 & 55 Vict. c. 45	5 August 1891
An Act to provide for and regulate the user by purchasing tenants of Rights of Turbary.
Post Office Act 1891 (repealed)	54 & 55 Vict. c. 46	5 August 1891
An Act to amend the Post Office Acts and to make provision for the Service of the Post Office. (Repealed by Sale of Food and Drugs Act 1899 (62 & 63 Vict. c. 51), Post Office Act 1908 (8 Edw. 7. c. 48) and Statute Law Revision Act 1950 (14 Geo. 6. c. 6))
Metalliferous Mines (Isle of Man) Act 1891 (repealed)	54 & 55 Vict. c. 47	5 August 1891
An Act to amend the Metalliferous Mines Regulation Act, 1872, (Note: Metalliferous Mines Regulation Act 1872 (35 & 36 Vict. c. 77)) in its application to the Isle of Man. (Repealed by Isle of Man Act 1958 (6 & 7 Eliz. 2. c. 11))
Purchase of Land (Ireland) Act 1891	54 & 55 Vict. c. 48	5 August 1891
An Act to provide further Funds for the Purchase of Land in Ireland, and to make permanent the Land Commission; and to provide for the Improvement of the Congested Districts in Ireland.
Returning Officers (Scotland) Act 1891 (repealed)	54 & 55 Vict. c. 49	5 August 1891
An Act to regulate the Charges of Returning Officers at Parliamentary Elections in Scotland. (Repealed by Representation of the People Act 1949 (12, 13 & 14 Geo. 6. c. 68))
Commissioners for Oaths Act 1891	54 & 55 Vict. c. 50	5 August 1891
An Act to amend the Commissioners for Oaths Act, 1889. (Note: Commissioners for Oaths Act 1889 (52 & 53 Vict. c. 10))
Slander of Women Act 1891 (repealed)	54 & 55 Vict. c. 51	5 August 1891
An Act to amend the Law relating to the Slander of Women. (Repealed for England and Wales by Defamation Act 2013 (c. 26) and for Northern Ireland by Defamation Act (Northern Ireland) 2022 (c. 30 (N.I.)))
Public Health (Scotland) Amendment Act 1891 (repealed)	54 & 55 Vict. c. 52	5 August 1891
An Act to amend the Public Health (Scotland) Acts. (Repealed by Water (Scotland) Act 1949 (12, 13 & 14 Geo. 6. c. 31))
Supreme Court of Judicature Act 1891 (repealed)	54 & 55 Vict. c. 53	5 August 1891
An Act to amend the Supreme Court of Judicature Acts. (Repealed by Supreme Court of Judicature (Consolidation) Act 1925 (15 & 16 Geo. 5. c. 49) and Constitutional Reform Act 2005 (c. 4))
Ranges Act 1891 (repealed)	54 & 55 Vict. c. 54	5 August 1891
An Act to facilitate the Acquisition of Ranges by Volunteer Corps and others. (Repealed by Military Lands Act 1892 (55 & 56 Vict. c. 43) and Statute Law Revision Act 1950 (14 Geo. 6. c. 6))
Appropriation Act 1891 (repealed)	54 & 55 Vict. c. 55	5 August 1891
An Act to apply a sum out of the Consolidated Fund to the service of the year ending on the thirty-first day of March one thousand eight hundred and ninety-two, and to appropriate the Supplies granted in this Session of Parliament. (Repealed by Statute Law Revision Act 1908 (8 Edw. 7. c. 49))
Elementary Education Act 1891 or the Free Education Act 1891 (repealed)	54 & 55 Vict. c. 56	5 August 1891
An Act to make further provision for assisting Education in Public Elementary Schools in England and Wales. (Repealed by Education Act 1918 (8 & 9 Geo. 5. c. 39))
Redemption of Rent (Ireland) Act 1891 (repealed)	54 & 55 Vict. c. 57	5 August 1891
An Act to provide for the Redemption of Rent by long Leaseholders and others. (Repealed by Statute Law Revision Act 1950 (14 Geo. 6. c. 6))
Western Highlands and Islands (Scotland) Works Act 1891 (repealed)	54 & 55 Vict. c. 58	5 August 1891
An Act to make provisions in regard to the Construction and Maintenance of certain Works of public and local utility in the Western Highlands and Islands of Scotland. (Repealed by Harbours, Piers and Ferries (Scotland) Act 1937 (1 Edw. 8 & 1 Geo. 6. c. 28))
Public Works Loans Act 1891 (repealed)	54 & 55 Vict. c. 59	5 August 1891
An Act to grant Money for the purpose of certain Local Loans, and for other purposes relating to Local Loans. (Repealed by Statute Law Revision Act 1908 (8 Edw. 7. c. 49))
Expiring Laws Continuance Act 1891 (repealed)	54 & 55 Vict. c. 60	5 August 1891
An Act to continue various Expiring Laws. (Repealed by Statute Law Revision Act 1908 (8 Edw. 7. c. 49))
Schools for Science and Art Act 1891 (repealed)	54 & 55 Vict. c. 61	5 August 1891
An Act to facilitate the transfer of Schools for Science and Art to Local Authorities. (Repealed by Education Act 1921 (11 & 12 Geo. 5. c. 51))
London County Council (Money) Act 1891 (repealed)	54 & 55 Vict. c. 62	5 August 1891
An Act to further amend the Acts relating to the raising of Money by the London County Council, and for other purposes. (Repealed by London County Council (Finance Consolidation) Act 1912 (2 & 3 Geo. 5. c. cv))
Highways and Bridges Act 1891 (repealed)	54 & 55 Vict. c. 63	5 August 1891
An Act to confer further powers on County Councils and other Authorities with respect to Main Roads and other Highways and Bridges. (Repealed by Highways Act 1959 (7 & 8 Eliz. 2. c. 25))
Land Registry (Middlesex Deeds) Act 1891 (repealed)	54 & 55 Vict. c. 64	5 August 1891
An Act to transfer the Middlesex Registry of Deeds to the Land Registry, and provide for the conduct of the business thereof. (Repealed by Land Registration and Land Charges Act 1971 (c. 54))
Lunacy Act 1891 (repealed)	54 & 55 Vict. c. 65	5 August 1891
An Act to amend the Lunacy Act, 1890. (Repealed by Mental Health Act 1959 (7 & 8 Eliz. 2. c. 72))
Local Registration of Title (Ireland) Act 1891 also known in Ireland as the Registration of Title Act 1891 (repealed)	54 & 55 Vict. c. 66	5 August 1891
An Act to establish Local Registries of Titles to Land in Ireland. (Repealed by Land Registration Act (Northern Ireland) 1970 (c. 18 (N.I.)))
Statute Law Revision Act 1891	54 & 55 Vict. c. 67	5 August 1891
An Act for further promoting the Revision of the Statute Law by repealing Enactments which have ceased to be in force or have become unnecessary.
County Councils (Elections) Act 1891 (repealed)	54 & 55 Vict. c. 68	5 August 1891
An Act to alter the Date of holding County Council Elections, and to remove Doubts respecting the Holding of such Elections. (Repealed for England and Wales by Local Government Act 1933 (23 & 24 Geo. 5. c. 51), for London by London Government Act 1939 (2 & 3 Geo. 6. c. 40) and for Northern Ireland by Local Government Act (Northern Ireland) 1972 (c. 9 (N.I.)))
Penal Servitude Act 1891	54 & 55 Vict. c. 69	5 August 1891
An Act to amend the Law relating to Penal Servitude and the Prevention of Crime. (Repealed for the Isle of Man by Statute Law Revision (Isle of Man) Act 1991 (c. 61))
Markets and Fairs (Weighing of Cattle) Act 1891	54 & 55 Vict. c. 70	5 August 1891
An Act to amend the Markets and Fairs (Weighing of Cattle) Act, 1887. (Note: Markets and Fairs (Weighing of Cattle) Act 1887 (50 & 51 Vict. c. 27))
Labourers (Ireland) Act 1891 (repealed)	54 & 55 Vict. c. 71	5 August 1891
An Act to amend the Labourers, Ireland, Acts. (Repealed by Irish Land Act 1903 (3 Edw. 7. c. 37) and Statute Law Revision (Northern Ireland) Act 1954 (c. 35 (N.I.)))
Coinage Act 1891 (repealed)	54 & 55 Vict. c. 72	5 August 1891
An Act to amend the Coinage Act, 1870. (Note: Coinage Act 1870 (33 & 34 Vict. c. 10)) (Repealed by Coinage Act 1971 (c. 24))
Mortmain and Charitable Uses Act 1891 (repealed)	54 & 55 Vict. c. 73	5 August 1891
An Act to amend the Mortmain and Charitable Uses Act, 1888, (Note: Mortmain and Charitable Uses Act 1888 (51 & 52 Vict. c. 42)) and the Law relating to Mortmain and Charitable Uses. (Repealed by Charities Act 1960 (8 & 9 Eliz. 2. c. 58))
Foreign Marriage Act 1891 (repealed)	54 & 55 Vict. c. 74	5 August 1891
An Act to amend and explain the Foreign Marriage Acts. (Repealed by Foreign Marriage Act 1892 (55 & 56 Vict. c. 23))
Factory and Workshop Act 1891 or the Factory Act 1891 (repealed)	54 & 55 Vict. c. 75	5 August 1891
An Act to amend the Law relating to Factories and Workshops. (Repealed by Factory and Workshop Act 1901 (1 Edw. 7. c. 22) and Statute Law Revision Act 1950 (14 Geo. 6. c. 6))
Public Health (London) Act 1891 (repealed)	54 & 55 Vict. c. 76	5 August 1891
An Act to consolidate and amend the Laws relating to Public Health in London. (Repealed by Public Health (London) Act 1936 (26 Geo. 5 & 1 Edw. 8. c. 50))

=== Local acts ===
Short title	Citation	Royal assent
Long title
Tramways Orders in Council (Ireland) (Athenry and Tuam Extension to Claremorris Railway) Confirmation Act 1891	54 & 55 Vict. c. i	10 February 1891
An Act to confirm an Order in Council of the Lord Lieutenant and Privy Council in Ireland relating to the Athenry and Tuam (Extension to Claremorris) Railway.
	Athenry and Tuam Extension to Claremorris Railway Order 1891 The Athenry and Tuam Extension to Claremorris Railway Order, 1890	
Local Government Board's Provisional Order Confirmation (Poor Law) Act 1891	54 & 55 Vict. c. ii	26 March 1891
An Act to confirm a Provisional Order of the Local Government Board under the provisions of the Poor Law Amendment Act, 1867, (Note: Poor Law Amendment Act 1867 (30 & 31 Vict. c. 106)) relating to the Parish of Birmingham.
	Birmingham Order 1891 Provisional Order for altering a Local Act. (Note: Birmingham Poor Relief Act 1831 (1 & 2 Will. 4. c. lxvii))	
Shakespeare Birthplace, &c., Trust Act 1891 (repealed)	54 & 55 Vict. c. iii	26 March 1891
An Act to incorporate the Trustees and Guardians of Shakespeare’s Birthplace, and to vest in them certain lands and other property in Stratford-upon-Avon, including the property known as Shakespeare’s Birthplace; and to provide for the maintenance in connection therewith of a Library and Museum; and for other purposes. (Repealed by Shakespeare Birthplace, &c. Trust Act 1961 (9 & 10 Eliz. 2. c. xxxviii))
Chew Valley Tramway (Abandonment) Act 1891	54 & 55 Vict. c. iv	11 May 1891
An Act for the Abandonment of the Tramway authorised by the Chew Valley Tramway Act, 1887. (Note: Chew Valley Tramway Act 1887 (50 & 51 Vict. c. cxci))
Llanelly (Local Board) Waterworks Act 1891	54 & 55 Vict. c. v	11 May 1891
An Act to authorise the Local Board of Health for the District of the Borough of Llanelly to make Additional Waterworks and for other purposes.
Standard Life Assurance Company's Act 1891 (repealed)	54 & 55 Vict. c. vi	11 May 1891
An Act to amend the provisions of the Acts regulating the Standard Life Assurance Company which relate to investment of the funds of the Company and for other purposes. (Repealed by Standard Life Assurance Company's Act 1910 (10 Edw. 7 & 1 Geo. 5. c. x))
Scottish Widows Fund and Life Assurance Society Act 1891 (repealed)	54 & 55 Vict. c. vii	11 May 1891
An Act to confer further powers on the Scottish Widows' Fund and Life Assurance Society and on the Ordinary Court of Directors thereof and for other purposes. (Repealed by Scottish Widows Fund and Life Assurance Society's Act 1926 (16 & 17 Geo. 5. c. lxxviii))
Mersey Dock Act 1891	54 & 55 Vict. c. viii	11 May 1891
An Act to authorise the Mersey Docks and Harbour Board to alter extend and improve their Docks Basins and Works at the northern end of their Liverpool Dock Estate and for other purposes.
Newark and Ollerton Railway Act 1891	54 & 55 Vict. c. ix	11 May 1891
An Act to revive the Powers for the compulsory purchase of Lands for and to extend the time limited for the completion of the Railway authorised by the Newark and Ollerton Railway Act 1887 (Note: Newark and Ollerton Railway Act 1887 (50 & 51 Vict. c. lxix)) and for other purposes.
Pewsey and Salisbury Railway (Abandonment) Act 1891 (repealed)	54 & 55 Vict. c. x	11 May 1891
An Act for the abandonment of the Pewsey and Salisbury Railway. (Repealed by Statute Law (Repeals) Act 2013 (c. 2))
Bristol Cemetery Act 1891	54 & 55 Vict. c. xi	11 May 1891
An Act to enable the Bristol General Cemetery Company to enlarge their Cemetery and for other purposes.
Bristol St. Augustine Bridge Act 1891	54 & 55 Vict. c. xii	11 May 1891
An Act to enable the Mayor Aldermen and Burgesses of the City of Bristol to construct a fixed bridge across the Floating Harbour or River Frome in lieu of the existing bridge called the Drawbridge and for other purposes.
Bolton Corporation Tramways Act 1891	54 & 55 Vict. c. xiii	11 May 1891
An Act to enable the Mayor Aldermen and Burgesses of the Borough of Bolton to construct Additional Tramways in and adjacent to the Borough and for other purposes.
Salford Corporation Act 1891	54 & 55 Vict. c. xiv	11 May 1891
An Act to unite the districts into which the County Borough of Salford is now divided and to enable the Mayor Aldermen and Burgesses of the said County Borough to make Street Improvements and further provision for the good government of the Borough and for other purposes.
Nitrate Railways Company Limited (Conversion of Shares) Act 1891	54 & 55 Vict. c. xv	11 May 1891
An Act to provide for the conversion by Agreement of the Ordinary Shares of the Nitrate Railways Company Limited into Preferred and Deferred Ordinary Shares and for other purposes.
Market Drayton Water Act 1891	54 & 55 Vict. c. xvi	11 May 1891
An Act for incorporating the Market Drayton Water Company and empowering them to construct Works and supply Water and for other purposes.
Ogmore Dock and Railway (Abandonment) Act 1891 (repealed)	54 & 55 Vict. c. xvii	11 May 1891
An Act for the abandonment of the Undertaking of the Ogmore Dock and Railway Company and for other purposes. (Repealed by Statute Law (Repeals) Act 2013 (c. 2))
Southampton Docks Act 1891	54 & 55 Vict. c. xviii	11 May 1891
An Act to enable the Southampton Dock Company to raise Additional Capital.
Great Northern Railway Act 1891	54 & 55 Vict. c. xix	11 May 1891
An Act to confer Further Powers upon the Great Northern Railway Company with respect to their own undertaking and undertakings in which they are jointly interested and for other purposes.
Lancashire County (Lunatic Asylums and other Powers) Act 1891 (repealed)	54 & 55 Vict. c. xx	11 May 1891
An Act to constitute a Lunatic Asylums Board for the County Palatine of Lancaster and to transfer the existing County Pauper Lunatic Asylums to such Board to repeal the Lancaster Annual General Sessions Act (Note: Lancaster Annual General Sessions Act 1798 (38 Geo. 3. c. lviii) and for other purposes. (Repealed by County of Lancashire Act 1984 (c. xxi))
Leighton Buzzard Gas Act 1891	54 & 55 Vict. c. xxi	11 May 1891
An Act to incorporate and confer powers on the Leighton Bussard Gas and Coke Company.
Mountain Ash Local Board Act 1891	54 & 55 Vict. c. xxii	11 May 1891
An Act to extend the time for the completion of the Waterworks authorised by the Mountain Ash Local Board Act 1886 (Note: Mountain Ash Local Board Act 1886 (49 & 50 Vict. c. cxiv)) to authorise the Mountain Ash Local Board to borrow further moneys and for other purposes.
Land Drainage Supplemental Act 1891	54 & 55 Vict. c. xxiii	11 May 1891
An Act to confirm a Provisional Order under the Land Drainage Act, 1861, (Note: Land Drainage Act 1861 (24 & 25 Vict. c. 133)) relating to Bluntisham Improvements, situate in the Parish of Bluntisham-cum-Earith, in the county of Huntingdon.
	In the matter of Bluntisham Improvements situate in the Parish of Bluntisham-cum-Earith in the county of Huntingdon.	
Metropolitan Police Provisional Order Confirmation Act 1891 (repealed)	54 & 55 Vict. c. xxiv	11 May 1891
An Act to confirm a Provisional Order made by one of Her Majesty's Principal Secretaries of State under the Metropolitan Police Act, 1886, (Note: Metropolitan Police Act 1886 (49 & 50 Vict. c. 22)) relating to lands in the Parishes of St. Pancras, St. John at Hackney, St. James's, Westminster, and St. Mary Cray. (Repealed by Statute Law (Repeals) Act 2008 (c. 12))
	Order made by the Secretary of State under the Metropolitan Police Act, 1886.	
Local Government Board's Provisional Orders Confirmation (No. 3) Act 1891	54 & 55 Vict. c. xxv	11 May 1891
An Act to confirm certain Provisional Orders of the Local Government Board relating to the Urban Sanitary Districts of Harrow, Ramsgate, Stafford, and Teignmouth.
	Harrow Order 1891 Provisional Order for partially repealing and altering a Confirming Act. (Note: Public Health Supplemental Act 1850 (13 & 14 Vict. c. 32))	
	Ramsgate Order 1891 Provisional Order for altering a Local Act (Note: Ramsgate Local Board Act 1877 (40 & 41 Vict. c. cxix)) and certain Confirming Acts.	
	Stafford Order 1891 Provisional Order for partially repealing and altering the Stafford Corporation Act, 1876. (Note: Stafford Corporation Act 1876 (39 & 40 Vict. c. cxcvi))	
	Teignmouth Order 1891 Provisional Order for altering a Local Act (Note: Teignmouth Improvement Act 1836 (6 & 7 Will. 4. c. lix)) and a Confirming Act. (Note: Local Government Supplemental Act 1859 (No. 2) (22 & 23 Vict. c. 11))	
Metropolitan Commons (Mitcham) Supplemental Act 1891	54 & 55 Vict. c. xxvi	11 May 1891
An Act to confirm a Scheme under the Metropolitan Commons Act, 1866, (Note: Metropolitan Commons Act 1866 (29 & 30 Vict. c. 122)) and the Metropolitan Commons Amendment Act, 1869, (Note: Metropolitan Commons Amendment Act 1869 (32 & 33 Vict. c. 107)) relating to Mitcham Common, Upper Green, Lower Green, Figgs Marsh, and Beddington Corner.
	Scheme with respect to Mitcham Common, Upper Green, Lower Green, Figgs Marsh, and Beddington Corner.	
Oyster and Mussel Fishery (Loch Sween) Order Confirmation Act 1891 (repealed)	54 & 55 Vict. c. xxvii	11 May 1891
An Act to confirm an Order made by the Secretary for Scotland under the Sea Fisheries Act, 1868, (Note: Sea Fisheries Act 1868 (31 & 32 Vict. c. 45)) relating to the Oyster and Mussel Fishery (Loch Sween). (Repealed by Statute Law (Repeals) Act 1998 (c. 43))
	Oyster and Mussel Fishery (Loch Sween) Order 1891 Order for the Establishment and Maintenance by Colonel John Wingfield Malcolm, Younger, of Poltalloch, M.P., and Major Duncan Campbell, of Inverneill and Ross, of a Several Oyster and Mussel Fishery in Loch Sween, in the county of Argyll.	
Filey Water and Gas Act 1891	54 & 55 Vict. c. xxviii	11 June 1891
An Act to confer further powers upon the Filey Water and Gas Company in relation to the supply of Water and Gas to extend their limits for the supply of Water to empower them to raise additional capital and for other purposes.
Folkestone Sandgate and Hythe Tramways Act 1891	54 & 55 Vict. c. xxix	11 June 1891
An Act to extend the time respectively for completing and opening certain Tramways authorised to be constructed by the Folkestone Sandgate and Hythe Tramways Company and for other purposes.
Taff Vale Railway Act 1891	54 & 55 Vict. c. xxx	11 June 1891
An Act to amend certain Acts relating to the Taff Vale Railway Company and for other purposes.
Scarborough, Bridlington and West Riding Junction Railways Act 1891	54 & 55 Vict. c. xxxi	11 June 1891
An Act to authorise the abandonment of a portion of the Undertaking of the Scarborough Bridlington and West Riding Junction Railways Company and for other purposes.
Perth Corporation Act 1891	54 & 55 Vict. c. xxxii	11 June 1891
An Act to enable the Corporation of Perth to create and issue redeemable Debenture Stock for the conversion and redemption of their debt and for other purposes.
Sunderland and South Shields Water Act 1891	54 & 55 Vict. c. xxxiii	11 June 1891
An Act for the granting of further powers to the Sunderland and South Shields Water Company and for other purposes.
North Staffordshire Railway Act 1891	54 & 55 Vict. c. xxxiv	11 June 1891
An Act to authorise the North Staffordshire Railway Company to construct new locks and approaches thereto on the Trent and Mersey Navigation to divert certain roads to acquire additional lands and to confer other powers on such Company.
Wirral Railway (Amalgamation) Act 1891	54 & 55 Vict. c. xxxv	11 June 1891
An Act for amalgamating the undertakings of the Wirral Railway Company and Seacombe Hoylake and Deeside Railway Company and for other purposes.
Norwich Union Life Insurance Society Act 1891 (repealed)	54 & 55 Vict. c. xxxvi	11 June 1891
An Act to empower the Norwich Union life Insurance Society to make new provisions for the government of the Society and the management of its affairs and for other purposes. (Repealed by Norwich Union Life Insurance Society Act 1905 (5 Edw. 7. c. xxxvi))
Glasgow Police (Sewage, &c.) Act 1891 (repealed)	54 & 55 Vict. c. xxxvii	11 June 1891
An Act to authorise the Magistrates and Council of the City and Royal Burgh of Glasgow as the Police Commissioners thereof to acquire lands for Sewage purposes and to raise further moneys and for other purposes. (Repealed by Statute Law (Repeals) Act 1995 (c. 44))
Clyde Navigation Act 1891	54 & 55 Vict. c. xxxviii	11 June 1891
An Act to authorise the Trustees of the Clyde Navigation to construct a new Road with Tramways thereon in substitution for portions of certain authorised Roads and Tramways other Roads a Railway Dock Tramway and a Quay or Wharf at Clydebank to abandon the Railway and some of the works authorised by the Acts of 1883 (Note: Clyde Navigation Act 1883 (46 & 47 Vict. c. clvi)) and 1890 (Note: Clyde Navigation Act 1890 (53 & 54 Vict. c. clvi)) and for other purposes.
North British Railway (Methil Harbour) Act 1891 (repealed)	54 & 55 Vict. c. xxxix	11 June 1891
An Act to empower the North British Railway Company to improve their Harbour at Methil in the County of Fife and to construct a new Dock there and other works in connexion therewith and for other purposes. (Repealed by Forth Ports Authority Order Confirmation Act 1969 (c. xxxiv))
Midland Railway Act 1891	54 & 55 Vict. c. xl	11 June 1891
An Act to confer additional powers upon the Midland Railway Company for the construction of works and the acquisition of lands for empowering that Company to increase their subscription to the Undertaking of the Tottenham and Forest Gate Railway Company and to contribute funds towards the Undertaking of the Guiseley Yeadon and Rawdon Railway Company to confirm an Agreement between the Midland Railway Company and the Swansea Harbour Trustees and for other purposes.
Midland Great Western Railway of Ireland Act 1891 (repealed)	54 & 55 Vict. c. xli	11 June 1891
An Act to enable-the Midland Great Western Railway of Ireland Company to carry into effect Agreements with the Treasury for the making maintaining and working certain Railways and for other purposes. (Repealed by Statute Law (Repeals) Act 2013 (c. 2))
Didcot Newbury and Southampton Railway Act 1891	54 & 55 Vict. c. xlii	11 June 1891
An Act to authorise the Didcot Newbury and Southampton Railway Company to abandon their Aldermaston Branch Railway and for other purposes.
Galashiels and Melrose Order Confirmation Act 1891	54 & 55 Vict. c. xliii	11 June 1891
An Act to confirm an Order of the Boundary Commissioners for Scotland relating to the parishes of Galashiels and Melrose, in the counties of Roxburgh and Selkirk.
	Galashiels and Melrose Order 1891 Order by the Boundary Commissioners for Scotland. Counties of Roxburgh and Selkirk. Parishes of Galashiels and Melrose.	
Ashkirk and Selkirk Order Confirmation Act 1891	54 & 55 Vict. c. xliv	11 June 1891
An Act to confirm an Order of the Boundary Commissioners for Scotland relating to the parishes of Ashkirk and Selkirk, in the counties of Roxburgh and Selkirk.
	Ashkirk and Selkirk Order 1891 Order by the Boundary Commissioners for Scotland. Counties of Roxburgh and Selkirk. Parishes of Ashkirk and Selkirk.	
Stirling and St. Ninians Order Confirmation Act 1891	54 & 55 Vict. c. xlv	11 June 1891
An Act to confirm an Order of the Boundary Commissioners for Scotland relating to the parishes of Stirling and St. Ninians, in the counties of Clackmannan and Stirling.
	Stirling and St. Ninians Order 1891 Order by the Boundary Commissioners for Scotland. Counties of Clackmannan and Stirling. Parishes of Stirling and St. Ninians.	
Local Government Board (Ireland) Provisional Order Confirmation (Newbridge) Act 1891	54 & 55 Vict. c. xlvi	11 June 1891
An Act to confirm a Provisional Order made by the Local Government Board for Ireland under the Public Health (Ireland) Act, 1878, (Note: Public Health (Ireland) Act 1878 (41 & 42 Vict. c. 52)) relating to the purchase of Land for a new Burial Ground within the district of Newbridge.
	Newbridge Burial Ground Provisional Order 1891 Newbridge Burial Ground. Naas Union. Provisional Order.	
Pilotage Orders Confirmation (No. 2) Act 1891 (repealed)	54 & 55 Vict. c. xlvii	11 June 1891
An Act to confirm certain Provisional Orders made by the Board of Trade under the Merchant Shipping (Pilotage) Act, 1889, (Note: Merchant Shipping (Pilotage) Act 1889 (52 & 53 Vict. c. 68)) relating to Humber and Swansea. (Repealed by Statute Law (Repeals) Act 1995 (c. 44))
	Humber Pilotage Order 1891 Order providing for the Representation of Pilots on the Pilotage Authorities for the Port of Kingston-upon-Hull and the River Humber.	
	Swansea Pilotage Order 1891 Order providing for the Representation of Pilots on the Pilotage Committee of the Swansea Harbour Trustees.	
Pier and Harbour Orders Confirmation (No. 1) Act 1891	54 & 55 Vict. c. xlviii	11 June 1891
An Act to confirm certain Provisional Orders made by the Board of Trade under the General Pier and Harbour Act, 1861, (Note: General Pier and Harbour Act 1861 (24 & 25 Vict. c. 45)) relating to Boscombe, Fraserburgh, Herne Bay, Mullion, Pennan, Scarborough, Uig, and Yarmouth (Great).
	Boscombe Pier Order 1891 Order for amending the Boscombe Pier Orders 1887 and 1889.	
	Fraserburgh Harbour Order 1891 Order for the Amendment of the Fraserburgh Harbour Act 1878 (Note: Fraserburgh Harbour Act 1878 (41 & 42 Vict. c. cii)) and the Fraserburgh Harbour Order 1884 and for conferring further powers on the Fraserburgh Harbour Commissioners.	
	Herne Bay Pier Order 1891 Order for repealing the Herne Bay Promenade Pier Order 1872 and authorising the Extension and Maintenance of a Pier and other Works at Herne Bay in the County of Kent.	
	Mullion Harbour and Piers Order 1891 Order for amending the Mullion Harbour and Piers Order, 1890, and for the construction, maintenance, and regulation of a Harbour, Piers, and Works at Mullion in the County of Cornwall, in the place of those authorised by the same Order.	
	Pennan Harbour Order 1891 Order for the Improvement, Maintenance, and Regulation of the Harbour of Pennan, in the Parish of Aberdour and County of Aberdeen.	
	Scarborough Promenade Pier Order 1891 Order for amending the Scarborough Promenade Pier Order 1866 and for the Construction and Maintenance of Additions to the Promenade Pier and Works at Scarborough in the North Riding of the County of York.	
	Uig Harbour Order 1891 Örder for the Construction, Maintenance, and Regulation of a Pier on the Western Shore of Uig Bay, situate in the Isle of Skye and in the Parish of Snizort and County of Inverness.	
	Great Yarmouth Port and Haven Order 1891 Order for amending the Great Yarmouth Port and Haven Act, 1866, (Note: Great Yarmouth Port and Haven Act 1866 (29 & 30 Vict. c. ccxlvii)) and the Great Yarmouth Port and Haven Order, 1874; and to provide for the Registration of Vessels using the Rivers within the Port of Great Yarmouth; and for other purposes.	
Electric Lighting Orders Confirmation (No. 1) Act 1891	54 & 55 Vict. c. xlix	11 June 1891
An Act to confirm certain Provisional Orders made by the Board of Trade under the Electric Lighting Acts, 1882 (Note: Electric Lighting Act 1882 (45 & 46 Vict. c. 56)) and 1888, (Note: Electric Lighting Act 1888 (51 & 52 Vict. c. 12)) relating to Bolton, Canterbury, Dewsbury, Hanley, Harrogate, and Sunderland.
	Bolton Electric Lighting Order 1891 Provisional Order granted by the Board of Trade under the Electric Lighting Acts 1882 and 1888 to the Mayor Aldermen and Burgesses of the Borough of Bolton in respect of the County Borough of Bolton.	
	Canterbury Electric Lighting Order 1891 Provisional Order granted by the Board of Trade under the Electric Lighting Acts 1882 and 1888 to the Mayor Aldermen and Citizens of the City of Canterbury in respect of the City of Canterbury.	
	Dewsbury Electric Lighting Order 1891 Provisional Order granted by the Board of Trade under the Electric Lighting Acts 1882 and 1888 to the Mayor Aldermen and Burgesses of the Borough of Dewsbury in the West Riding of the County of York in respect of the Borough of Dewsbury.	
	Hanley Electric Lighting Order 1891 Provisional Order granted by the Board of Trade under the Electric Lighting Acts 1882 and 1888 to the Mayor Aldermen and Burgesses of the Borough of Hanley in the County of Stafford in respect of the said Borough.	
	Harrogate Electric Lighting Order 1891 Provisional Order granted by the Board of Trade under the Electric Lighting Acts 1882 and 1888 to the Mayor Aldermen and Burgesses of the Borough of Harrogate in the West Riding of the County of York in respect of the Borough of Harrogate.	
	Sunderland Electric Lighting Order 1891 Provisional Order granted by the Board of Trade under the Electric Lighting Acts 1882 and 1888 to the Mayor Aldermen and Burgesses of the County Borough of Sunderland in respect of the County Borough of Sunderland.	
Electric Lighting Orders Confirmation (No. 2) Act 1891	54 & 55 Vict. c. l	11 June 1891
An Act to confirm certain Provisional Orders made by the Board of Trade under the Electric Lighting Acts, 1882 and 1888, relating to Ealing, Norwich, Southport, Stockport, Surbiton, and Tynemouth.
	Ealing Electric Lighting Order 1891 Provisional Order granted by the Board of Trade under the Electric Lighting Acts 1882 and 1888 to the Ealing Local Board in respect of the Urban Sanitary District of Ealing in the County of Middlesex.	
	Norwich Electric Lighting Order 1891 Provisional Order granted by the Board of Trade under the Electric Lighting Acts, 1882 and 1888, to the Norwich Electricity Company Limited, in respect of the city and county of the city of Norwich.	
	Southport Electric Lighting Order 1891 Provisional Order granted by the Board of Trade under the Electric Lighting Acts 1882 and 1888 to the Mayor Aldermen and Burgesses of the borough of Southport in respect of the borough of Southport in the county of Lancaster.	
	Stockport Electric Lighting Order 1891 Provisional Order granted by the Board of Trade under the Electric Lighting Acts 1882 and 1888 to the Mayor Aldermen and Burgesses of the county borough of Stockport in respect of the county borough of Stockport.	
	Surbiton Electric Lighting Order 1891 Provisional Order granted by the Board of Trade under the Electric Lighting Acts 1882 and 1888 to the Surbiton Improvement Commissioners in respect of the Surbiton Improvement District in the county of Surreу.	
	Tynemouth Corporation Electric Lighting Order 1891 Provisional Order granted by the Board of Trade under the Electric Lighting Acts 1882 and 1888 to the Mayor Aldermen and Burgesses of the borough of Tynemouth in respect of the borough of Tynemouth in the county of Northumberland.	
Electric Lighting Orders Confirmation (No. 3) Act 1891	54 & 55 Vict. c. li	11 June 1891
An Act to confirm certain Provisional Orders made by the Board of Trade under the Electric Lighting Acts, 1882 and 1888, relating to Bishop's Stortford, Croydon, Heckmondwike, Londonderry, Southend, and Weston-super-Mare.
	Bishop's Stortford Electric Lighting Order 1891 Provisional Order granted by the Board of Trade under the Electric Lighting Acts, 1882 and 1888, to the Bishop's Stortford Electric Light and Steam Laundry Company, Limited, in respect of the parish of Bishop's Stortford.	
	Croydon Corporation Electric Lighting Order 1891 Provisional Order granted by the Board of Trade under the Electric Lighting Acts 1882 and 1888 to the Mayor Aldermen and Burgesses of the county borough of Croydon in respect of the county borough of Croydon.	
	Heckmondwike Electric Lighting Order 1891 Provisional Order granted by the Board of Trade under the Electric Lighting Acts 1882 and 1888 to the Heckmondwike Local Board in respect of the District of Heckmondwike.	
	Londonderry Electric Lighting Order 1891 Provisional Order granted by the Board of Trade under the Electric Lighting Acts 1882 and 1888 to the Mayor Aldermen and Burgesses of the City of Londonderry in respect of the City of Londonderry.	
	Southend Electric Lighting Order 1891 Provisional Order granted by the Board of Trade under the Electric Lighting Acts 1882 and 1888 to the Local Board for the District of Southend in respect of the urban sanitary district of Southend in the county of Essex.	
	Weston-super-Mare Electric Lighting Order 1891 Provisional Order granted by the Board of Trade under the Electric Lighting Acts 1882 and 1888 to the Weston-super-Mare Improvement Commissioners in respect of the urban sanitary district of Weston-super-Mare in the county of Somerset.	
Electric Lighting Orders Confirmation (No. 4) Act 1891	54 & 55 Vict. c. lii	11 June 1891
An Act to confirm certain Provisional Orders made by the Board of Trade under the Electric Lighting Acts, 1882 and 1888, relating to Acton, Chiswick, Coventry, Kidderminster, Llanelly, and South Shields.
	Acton Electric Lighting Order 1891 Provisional Order granted by the Board of Trade under the Electric Lighting Acts 1882 and 1888 to the Acton Local Board in respect of the Urban Sanitary District of Acton in the County of Middlesex.	
	Chiswick Electric Lighting Order 1891 Provisional Order granted by the Board of Trade under the Electric Lighting Acts 1882 and 1888 to the Chiswick Local Board in respect of the Parish of Chiswick in the County of Middlesex.	
	Coventry Electric Lighting Order 1891 Provisional Order granted by the Board of Trade under the Electric Lighting Acts 1882 and 1888 to the Mayor, Aldermen and Citizens of the city of Coventry in respect of the city of Coventry.	
	Kidderminster Electric Lighting Order 1891 Provisional Order granted by the Board of Trade under the Electric Lighting Acts 1882 and 1888 to the Mayor Aldermen and Burgesses of the Borough of Kidderminster in respect of the Borough of Kidderminster.	
	Llanelly Electric Lighting Order 1891 Provisional Order granted by the Board of Trade under the Electric Lighting Acts 1882 and 1888 to the Local Board of Health for the District of Llanelly in respect of the Local Government District of Llanelly in the County of Carmarthen.	
	South Shields Electric Lighting Order 1891 Provisional Order granted by the Board of Trade under the Electric Lighting Acts 1882 and 1888 to the mayor aldermen and burgesses of the county borough of South Shields in respect of the said borough.	
Metropolis (Shelton Street, St. Giles) Provisional Order Confirmation Act 1891	54 & 55 Vict. c. liii	11 June 1891
An Act to confirm a Provisional Order made by one of Her Majesty's Principal Secretaries of State for modifying the Metropolis (Shelton Street, St. Giles) Improvement Scheme, 1886.
	Shelton Street, St. Giles Improvement Order 1891 Housing of the Working Classes Act, 1890. (Note: Housing of the Working Classes Act 1890 (53 & 54 Vict. c. 70)) In the matter of the Metropolis (Shelton Street, St. Giles) Improvement Scheme, 1886. Provisional Order.	
Inclosure (Mungrisdale) Provisional Order Confirmation Act 1891	54 & 55 Vict. c. liv	3 July 1891
An Act to confirm a Provisional Order for the Inclosure of Mungrisdale Low Common, situate in the parish of Greystoke, in the county of Cumberland, in pursuance of a report from the Board of Agriculture.
	Mungrisdale (Cumberland) Common Order 1891 Provisional Order for the Inclosure of a Common.	
Education Department Provisional Orders Confirmation (West Ham, &c.) Act 1891	54 & 55 Vict. c. lv	3 July 1891
An Act to confirm certain Provisional Orders made by the Education Department under the Elementary Education Act, 1870, (Note: Elementary Education Act 1870 (33 & 34 Vict. c. 75)) to enable the School Boards for West Ham, Tottenham, Portsmouth, Chiswick, and Hackford and Whitwell United District to put in force the Lands Clauses Consolidation Act, 1845, (Note: Lands Clauses Consolidation Act 1845 (8 & 9 Vict. c. 18)) and the Acts amending the same.
	West Ham (Essex) School Board Order 1891 The School Board for West Ham, County of Essex. Provisional Order for putting in force the Lands Clauses Consolidation Act, 1845.	
	Tottenham (Middlesex) School Board Order 1891 The School Board for Tottenham, County of Middlesex. Provisional Order for putting in force the Lands Clauses Consolidation Act, 1845.	
	Portsmouth (Hants) School Board Order 1891 The School Board for Portsmouth, County of Hants. Provisional Order for putting in force the Lands Clauses Consolidation Act, 1845.	
	Chiswick (Middlesex) School Board Order 1891 The School Board for Chiswick, County of Middlesex. Provisional Order for putting in force the Lands Clauses Consolidation Act, 1845.	
	Hackford and Whitwell (Norfolk) School Board Order 1891 The School Board for Hackford and Whitwell United District, County of Norfolk. Provisional Order for putting in force the Lands Clauses Consolidation Act, 1845.	
Local Government Board (Ireland) Provisional Order Confirmation (Kilrush Gas) Act 1891	54 & 55 Vict. c. lvi	3 July 1891
An Act to confirm a Provisional Order made by the Local Government Board for Ireland under the Public Health (Ireland) Act, 1878, (Note: Public Health (Ireland) Act 1878 (41 & 42 Vict. c. 52)) relating to the purchase of Gasworks in the Township of Kilrush.
	Kilrush Gas Order 1891 Kilrush Gas. Provisional Order.	
Local Government Board (Ireland) Provisional Orders Confirmation (No. 3) Act 1891	54 & 55 Vict. c. lvii	3 July 1891
An Act to confirm two Provisional Orders of the Local Government Board for Ireland under the Public Health Ireland) Act, 1878, relating to the improvement of Streets in the Boroughs of Belfast and Londonderry.
	Local Government Board (Ireland) Provisional Order Belfast Streets Improvement 1891 Belfast Improvement. Provisional Order.	
	Londonderry (New Streets) Provisional Order 1891 Borough of Londonderry. Provisional Order.	
Local Government Board (Ireland) Provisional Orders Confirmation (No. 4) Act 1891	54 & 55 Vict. c. lviii	3 July 1891
An Act to confirm two Provisional Orders made by the Local Government Board for Ireland under the Public Health (Ireland) Act, 1878, relating to the purchase of Land for Waterworks in the Township of Clonmel and within the District of Mitchelstown,
	Clonmel Waterworks Provisional Order 1891 Clonmel Waterworks. Provisional Order.	
	Mitchelstown Waterworks Provisional Order 1891 Mitchelstown Waterworks. Provisional Order.	
Fire Brigade Superannuation (Manchester) Provisional Order Confirmation Act 1891	54 & 55 Vict. c. lix	3 July 1891
An Act to confirm a Provisional Order made by one of Her Majesty's Principal Secretaries of State in pursuance of section twenty-two of the Police Act, 1890, (Note: Police Act 1890 (53 & 54 Vict. c. 45)) relating to the Superannuation of the Members of the Fire Brigade of the City of Manchester.
	Fire Brigade Superannuation (Manchester) Order 1891 Provisional Order made in pursuance of Section Twenty-two of the Police Act, 1890.	
London (Boundary Street, Bethnal Green) Provisional Order Confirmation Act 1891	54 & 55 Vict. c. lx	3 July 1891
An Act to confirm a Provisional Order made by one of Her Majesty's Principal Secretaries of State for the improvement of an unhealthy area situated in the Parishes of St. Matthew, Bethnal Green, and St. Leonard, Shoreditch, in the County of London.
	Boundary Street, Bethnal Green Order 1891 London (Boundary Street, Bethnal Green) Improvement Scheme, 1890. Provisional Order.	
Thames Valley Drainage Provisional Order Confirmation Act 1891	54 & 55 Vict. c. lxi	3 July 1891
An Act to confirm a Provisional Order under the Thames Valley Drainage Act, 1871, (Note: Thames Valley Drainage Act 1871 (34 & 35 Vict. c. clviii)) to enable the Thames Valley Drainage Commissioners to put in force the compulsory clauses of the Lands Clauses Acts relating to certain lands in the parish of Northmoor, in the county of Oxford, and in the parish of Appleton with the township of Eaton, in the county of Berks.
	Thames Valley Drainage Order 1891 Provisional Order to enable the Thames Valley Drainage Commissioners to put in force the compulsory clauses of the Lands Clauses Acts.	
Electric Lighting Orders Confirmation (No. 5) Act 1891	54 & 55 Vict. c. lxii	3 July 1891
An Act to confirm certain Provisional Orders made by the Board of Trade under the Electric Lighting Acts, 1882 and 1888, relating to Bromley, Preston, Scarborough, Torquay, Tunbridge Wells, and Withington District.
	Bromley (Kent) Electric Lighting Order 1891 Provisional Order granted by the Board of Trade under the Electric Lighting Acts 1882 and 1888 to the Bromley Local Board in respect of the Urban Sanitary District of Bromley in the County of Kent.	
	Preston Electric Lighting Order 1891 Provisional Order granted by Board of Trade under the Electric Lighting Acts 1882 and 1888 to the National Electric Supply Company Limited in respect of the County Borough of Preston.	
	Scarborough Corporation Electric Lighting Order 1891 Provisional Order granted by the Board of Trade under the Electric Lighting Acts 1882 and 1888 to the Mayor Aldermen and Burgesses of the borough of Scarborough in respect of the borough of Scarborough in the County of York.	
	Torquay Electric Lighting Order 1891 Provisional Order granted by the Board of Trade under the Electric Lighting Acts 1882 and 1888 to the Local Board for the district of Torquay in respect of the district of Torquay in the county of Devon.	
	Tunbridge Wells Electric Lighting Order 1891 Provisional Order granted by the Board of Trade under the Electric Lighting Acts 1882 and 1888 to the Mayor Aldermen and Burgesses of Tunbridge Wells in respect of the Borough of Tunbridge Wells.	
	Withington District Electric Supply Order 1891 Provisional Order granted by the Board of Trade under the Electric Lighting Acts 1882 and 1888 to the Manchester House-to-House Electricity Company (Limited), in respect of the local board district of Withington, in the county of Lancaster.	
Electric Lighting Orders Confirmation (No. 6) Act 1891 (repealed)	54 & 55 Vict. c. lxiii	3 July 1891
An Act to confirm certain Provisional Orders made by the Board of Trade under the Electric Lighting Acts, 1882 to 1890, relating to Edinburgh and Paisley. (Repealed by South of Scotland Electricity Order Confirmation Act 1956 (4 & 5 Eliz. 2. c. xciv))
	Edinburgh Corporation Electric Lighting Order 1891 Provisional Order granted by the Board of Trade under the Electric Lighting Acts, 1882 to 1890, to the Lord Provost, Magistrates and Town Council of the City and Royal Burgh of Edinburgh, in respect of the City and Royal Burgh of Edinburgh.	
	Paisley Electric Lighting Order 1891 Provisional Order granted by the Board of Trade under the Electric Lighting Acts 1882 to 1890 to the Magistrates and Town Council of the Burgh of Paisley in respect of the Burgh of Paisley.	
Electric Lighting Orders Confirmation (No. 7) Act 1891	54 & 55 Vict. c. lxiv	3 July 1891
An Act to confirm certain Provisional Orders made by the Board of Trade under the Electric Lighting Acts, 1882 and 1888, relating to Hertford, Killarney, Kingston-upon-Thames, Liverpool, Toxteth Park, and Whitehaven.
	Hertford Electric Lighting Order 1891 Provisional Order granted by the Board of Trade under the Electric Lighting Acts 1882 and 1888 to the Mayor Aldermen and Burgesses of the Borough of Hertford in respect of the Borough of Hertford in the County of Hertford and the Rural Sanitary District of the Hertford Union.	
	Killarney Electric Lighting Order 1891 Provisional Order granted by the Board of Trade under the Electric Lighting Acts, 1882 and 1888, to Charles Edward Leahy, of Ballycarthy, Tralee, in the County of Kerry, in respect of the Urban Sanitary District of Killarney, in the County of Kerry.	
	Kingston-upon-Thames Electric Lighting Order 1891 Provisional Order granted by the Board of Trade under the Electric Lighting Acts 1882 and 1888 to the Mayor Aldermen and Burgesses of the Borough of Kingston-upon-Thames in respect of the said Borough.	
	Liverpool Electric Lighting Order 1891 Provisional Order granted by the Board of Trade under the Electric Lighting Acts, 1882 and 1888, to the Liverpool Electric Supply Company, Limited, in respect of a part of the City of Liverpool.	
	Toxteth Park Electric Lighting Order 1891 Provisional Order granted by the Board of Trade under the Electric Lighting Acts, 1882 and 1888, to the Liverpool Electric Supply Company, Limited, in respect of a portion of the Local Government District of Toxteth Park, in the County of Lancaster.	
	Whitehaven Electric Lighting Order 1891 Provisional Order granted by the Board of Trade under the Electric Lighting Acts, 1882 and 1888, to the Trustees of the Town and Harbour of Whitehaven in respect of the Town of Whitehaven in the County of Cumberland.	
Electric Lighting Orders Confirmation (No. 9) Act 1891	54 & 55 Vict. c. lxv	3 July 1891
An Act to confirm certain Provisional Orders made by the Board of Trade under the Electric Lighting Acts, 1882 and 1888, relating to Camberwell, Islington, Southwark, Wandsworth District, and Westminster.
	Camberwell Electric Lighting Order 1891 Provisional Order granted by the Board of Trade under the Electric Lighting Acts 1882 and 1888 to the Camberwell and Islington Electric Light and Power Supply Limited in respect of a portion of the Parish of St. Giles Camberwell in the County of London.	
	Islington Electric Lighting Order 1891 Provisional Order granted by the Board of Trade under the Electric Lighting Acts 1882 and 1888 to the Camberwell and Islington Electric Light and Power Supply Limited in respect of the Parish of St. Mary Islington in the county of London.	
	Southwark Electric Lighting Order 1891 Provisional Order granted by the Board of Trade under the Electric Lighting Acts, 1882 and 1888, to the Brush Electrical Engineering Company, Limited, in respect of the District of St. Saviour's District Board of Works in the County of London.	
	Wandsworth District Electric Lighting Order 1891 Provisional Order granted by the Board of Trade under the Electric Lighting Acts 1882 and 1888 to the Stamford Hill Tottenham and Edmonton Electric Light and Power Supply Limited in respect of the district of the Wandsworth District Board of Works in the county of London.	
	Westminster Electric Lighting Order 1891 Provisional Order granted by the Board of Trade under the Electric Lighting Acts, 1882 and 1888, to the Westminster Electric Supply Corporation, Limited, in respect of the united parishes of St. Margaret and St. John, Westminster.	
Local Government Board's Provisional Orders Confirmation (No. 2) Act 1891	54 & 55 Vict. c. lxvi	3 July 1891
An Act to confirm certain Provisional Orders of the Local Government Board relating to the Urban Sanitary Districts of Baildon, Derby, Idle, and Middleton, and to the Rural Sanitary District of the Watford Union.
	Baildon Order 1891 Provisional Order to enable the Sanitary Authority for the Urban Sanitary District of Baildon to put in force the Compulsory Clauses of the Lands Clauses Acts.	
	Derby Order 1891 Provisional Order to enable the Urban Sanitary Authority for the Borough of Derby to put in force the Compulsory Clauses of the Lands Clauses Acts.	
	Idle Order 1891 Provisional Order to enable the Sanitary Authority for the Urban Sanitary District of Idle to put in force the Compulsory Clauses of the Lands Clauses Acts.	
	Middleton Order 1891 Provisional Order to enable the Urban Sanitary Authority for the Borough of Middleton to put in force the Compulsory Clauses of the Lands Clauses Acts.	
	Watford Union Order 1891 Provisional Order to enable the Sanitary Authority for the Rural Sanitary District of the Watford Union to put in force the Compulsory Clauses of the Lands Clauses Acts.	
Local Government Board's Provisional Orders Confirmation (No. 4) Act 1891	54 & 55 Vict. c. lxvii	3 July 1891
An Act to confirm certain Provisional Orders of the Local Government Board relating to the Urban Sanitary Districts of Coventry, Dudley, Filey, Knaresborough and Tentergate, Oxford, and Rawtenstall, and to the Rural Sanitary District of the Chester-le-Street Union.
	Chester-le-Street Union Order 1891 Provisional Order to enable the Sanitary Authority for the Rural Sanitary District of the Chester-le-Street Union to put in force the Compulsory Clauses of the Lands Clauses Acts.	
	Coventry Order 1891 Provisional Order to enable the Urban Sanitary Authority for the City of Coventry to put in force the Compulsory Clauses of the Lands Clauses Acts.	
	Dudley Order 1891 Provisionai Order to enable the Urban Sanitary Authority for the Borough of Dudley to put in force the Compulsory Clauses of the Lands Clauses Acts.	
	Filey Order 1891 Provisional Order to enable the Sanitary Authority for the Urban Sanitary District of Filey to put in force the Compulsory Clauses of the Lands Clauses Acts.	
	Knaresborough and Tentergate Order 1891 Provisional Order to enable the Sanitary Authority for the Urban Sanitary District of Knaresborough and Tentergate to put in force the Compulsory Clauses of the Lands Clauses Acts.	
	Oxford Order 1891 Provisional Order to enable the Urban Sanitary Authority for the City of Oxford to put in force the Compulsory Clauses of the Lands Clauses Acts.	
	Rawtenstall Order 1891 Provisional Order to enable the Sanitary Authority for the Urban Sanitary District of Rawtenstall to put in force the Compulsory Clauses of the Lands Clauses Acts.	
Local Government Board's Provisional Orders Confirmation (No. 5) Act 1891	54 & 55 Vict. c. lxviii	3 July 1891
An Act to confirm certain Provisional Orders of the Local Government Board relating to the Urban Sanitary Districts of Bath, Clifton Dartmouth Hardness, Devonport, Plymouth, and Stapleton, and to the Rural Sanitary District of the Hendon Union.
	Bath Order 1891 Provisional Order to enable the Urban Sanitary Authority for the City of Bath to put in force the Compulsory Clauses of the Lands Clauses Acts.	
	Clifton Dartmouth Hardness Order 1891 Provisional Order to enable the Urban Sanitary Authority for the Borough of Clifton Dartmouth Hardness to put in force the Compulsory Clauses of the Lands Clauses Acts.	
	Devonport Order 1891 Provisional Order to enable the Urban Sanitary Authority for the Borough of Devonport to put in force the Compulsory Clauses of the Lands Clauses Acts.	
	Hendon Union Order 1891 Provisional Order to enable the Sanitary Authority for the Rural Sanitary District of the Hendon Union to put in force the Compulsory Clauses of the Lands Clauses Acts.	
	Plymouth Order 1891 Provisional Order to enable the Urban Sanitary Authority for the Borough of Plymouth to put in force the Compulsory Clauses of the Lands Clauses Acts.	
	Stapleton Order 1891 Provisional Order to enable the Sanitary Authority for the Urban Sanitary District of Stapleton to put in force the Compulsory Clauses of the Lands Clauses Acts.	
Local Government Board's Provisional Orders Confirmation (No. 6) Act 1891	54 & 55 Vict. c. lxix	3 July 1891
An Act to confirm certain Provisional Orders of the Local Government Board relating to the Urban Sanitary Districts of Chorley, Daventry, Newcastle-under-Lyme, Rochester, and Saint Helens.
	Chorley Order 1891 Provisional Order for altering the Chorley Improvement Act, 1871. (Note: Chorley Improvement Act 1871 (16 & 17 Vict. c. clxxxі))	
	Daventry Order 1891 Provisional Order for altering a Confirming Act. (Note: Local Government Board's Provisional Orders Confirmation (Abingdon, Barnsley, &c.) Act 1875 (38 & 39 Vict. с. сcxі))	
	Newcastle-under-Lyme Order 1891 Provisional Order for partially repealing and altering the Newcastle-under-Lyme Corporation Act, 1877. (Note: Newcastle-under-Lyme Corporation Act 1877 (40 & 41 Vict. c. clxxii))	
	Rochester Order 1891 Provisional Order for altering the Rochester City Improvement Act, 1880. (Note: Rochester City Improvement Act 1880 (43 & 44 Vict. c. cxix))	
	Saint Helens Order 1891 Provisional Order for altering a Local Act (Note: St. Helens Improvement Act 1869 (32 & 33 Vict. c. сxx)) and a Confirming Act. (Note: Local Government Board's Provisional Orders Confirmation (Belper Union, &c.) Act 1877 (40 & 41 Vict. c.cxxxіi))	
Local Government Board's Provisional Orders Confirmation (No. 8) Act 1891	54 & 55 Vict. c. lxx	3 July 1891
An Act to confirm certain Provisional Orders of the Local Government Board relating to the Urban Sanitary Districts of Brighton, Cheltenham, Linthwaite, Southport, and Waltham-Holy-Cross.
	Brighton Order 1891 Provisional Order for partially repealing and altering certain Local Acts. (Note: Brighton Royal Pavilion Act 1850 (13 & 14 Vict. c. v)) (Note: Brighton Pavilion Act 1867 (30 & 31 Vict. c. xxii)) (Note: Brighton Pavilion Acts Amendment Act 1876 (39 & 40 Vict. c. xxxiv))	
	Cheltenham Order 1891 Provisional Order to enable the Urban Sanitary Authority for the Borough of Cheltenham to put in force the Compulsory Clauses of the Lands Clauses Acts.	
	Linthwaite Order 1891 Provisional Order to enable the Sanitary Authority for the Urban Sanitary District of Linthwaite to put in force the Compulsory Clauses of the Lands Clauses Acts.	
	Southport Order 1891 Provisional Order to enable the Urban Sanitary Authority for the Borough of Southport to put in force the Compulsory Clauses of the Lands Clauses Acts.	
	Waltham Holy Cross Order 1891 Provisional Order to enable the Sanitary Authority for the Urban Sanitary District of Waltham Holy Cross to put in force the Compulsory Clauses of the Lands Clauses Acts.	
Local Government Board's Provisional Orders Confirmation (No. 10) Act 1891	54 & 55 Vict. c. lxxi	3 July 1891
An Act to confirm certain Provisional Orders of the Local Government Board for constituting joint committees to enforce the provisions of the Rivers Pollution Prevention Act, 1876, (Note: Rivers Pollution Prevention Act 1876 (39 & 40 Vict. c. 75)) in relation to parts of the Rivers Irwell, Mersey, and Ribble.
	Rivers Mersey and Irwell Order 1891 Provisional Order for constituting a Joint Committee (Note: Rivers Mersey and Irwell Joint Committee.) under Section 14 of the Local Government Act, 1888. (Note: Local Government Act 1888 (51 & 52 Vict. c. 41))	
	River Ribble Order 1891 Provisional Order for constituting a Joint Committee (Note: River Ribble Joint Committee.) under Section 14 of the Local Government Act, 1888.	
Latimer Road and Acton Railway Act 1891 (repealed)	54 & 55 Vict. c. lxxii	3 July 1891
An Act to extend the time for the compulsory purchase of lands for and for the completion of the Latimer Road and Acton Railway. (Repealed by Latimer Road and Acton Railway Act 1900 (63 & 64 Vict. c. xcv))
Plymouth and Dartmoor Railway Act 1891	54 & 55 Vict. c. lxxiii	3 July 1891
An Act to confer further powers upon the Plymouth and Dartmoor Railway Company.
Thames Deep Water Dock Act 1891	54 & 55 Vict. c. lxxiv	3 July 1891
An Act to revive the powers and extend the periods for the Compulsory Purchase of Lands for and for the completion of the Dock and Works authorised by the Thames Deep Water Dock Act 1881 (Note: Thames Deep Water Dock Act 1881 (44 & 45 Vict. c. cxlii)) and for other purposes.
Bude Harbour and Canal (Further Powers) Act 1891	54 & 55 Vict. c. lxxv	3 July 1891
An Act authorising the Abandonment and Discontinuance of portions of the Canal the Maintenance and Continuance of the Harbour at Bude and of portions of the Canal the Maintenance of a portion of the Canal and of the Reservoir as Waterworks the Supply of Water to Local and other Authorities and for conferring further powers on the Company of Proprietors of the Bude Harbour and Canal in relation to their Undertaking and for other purposes.
Dublin, Wicklow and Wexford Railway Act 1891	54 & 55 Vict. c. lxxvi	3 July 1891
An Act to extend the time for the completion of the City of Dublin Junction Railways to make provision with reference to superfluous lands and for other purposes.
London Overhead Wires Act 1891 (repealed)	54 & 55 Vict. c. lxxvii	3 July 1891
An Act to provide for the control and regulation of Overhead Wires in the Administrative County of London. (Repealed by London Overground Wires, &c. Act 1933 (23 & 24 Geo. 5. c. xliv))
London Sky Signs Act 1891 (repealed)	54 & 55 Vict. c. lxxviii	3 July 1891
An Act for the prohibition of future and regulation of existing Sky Signs in the Administrative County of London. (Repealed by London Building Act 1894 (57 & 58 Vict. c. ccxiii))
South Eastern Railway Act 1891	54 & 55 Vict. c. lxxix	3 July 1891
An Act for conferring further powers on the South-eastern Railway Company and upon the Cranbrook and Paddock Wood Railway Company and for other purposes.
Pelican Life Insurance Company's Act 1891	54 & 55 Vict. c. lxxx	3 July 1891
An Act to repeal the Special Acts of the Pelican Life Insurance Company and to make provisions as to the constitution government and capital of the Company and for other purposes.
Royal Insurance Company's Act 1891	54 & 55 Vict. c. lxxxi	3 July 1891
An Act to define and extend the objects of the Royal Insurance Company to provide for the transfer to that Company of the business of the Queen Insurance Company and for other purposes.
Metropolitan District Railway Act 1891	54 & 55 Vict. c. lxxxii	3 July 1891
An Act to confer further powers on the Metropolitan District Railway Company and for other purposes.
Fylde Water Act 1891	54 & 55 Vict. c. lxxxiii	3 July 1891
An Act for the granting of further Powers to the Fylde Waterworks Company and for other purposes.
Garw and Ogmore Gas Act 1891	54 & 55 Vict. c. lxxxiv	3 July 1891
An Act to incorporate the Garw and Ogmore Gas Company and authorise them to construct Gasworks and to supply Gas in certain parishes and places in the County of Glamorgan.
Gifford and Garvald Railway Act 1891	54 & 55 Vict. c. lxxxv	3 July 1891
An Act to incorporate the Gifford and Garvald Railway Company and to empower them to construct a Railway in the County of Haddington and for other purposes.
Barmouth Local Board Act 1891	54 & 55 Vict. c. lxxxvi	3 July 1891
An Act to authorise the Barmouth Local Board to make Waterworks to make further and better provision for the improvement health and good government of the District to raise further Moneys and for other purposes.
Birkenhead Corporation Act 1891	54 & 55 Vict. c. lxxxvii	3 July 1891
An Act to extend the Eastern Boundary of the borough of Birkenhead to the centre of the River Mersey to make further provisions for Street Improvements and as to the Public Libraries Ferries and Markets of the borough and for other purposes relating to the Local Government of the borough.
Crowland Railway Act 1891	54 & 55 Vict. c. lxxxviii	3 July 1891
An Act for making a Railway from Peakirk in the County of Northampton to Crowland in the County of Lincoln and for other purposes.
Glasgow and South Western Railway (Additional Powers) Act 1891	54 & 55 Vict. c. lxxxix	3 July 1891
An Act for conferring further powers on the Glasgow and South-western Railway Company for the construction of works the acquisition of lands and the raising of money for authorising them to acquire jointly with the Caledonian Railway Company the Shieldhall Branch Railway and for other purposes.
Glasgow Corporation (Partick, Hillhead and Maryhill) Gas Act 1891 (repealed)	54 & 55 Vict. c. xc	3 July 1891
An Act to provide for the purchase by the Corporation of Glasgow of the Undertaking of the Partick, Hillhead and Maryhill Gas Company, Limited; and for other purposes in connexion therewith. (Repealed by Glasgow Gas Act 1910 (10 Edw. 7 & 1 Geo. 5. c. cxxxi))
Kettering Gas Act 1891	54 & 55 Vict. c. xci	3 July 1891
An Act for incorporating and conferring powers on the Kettering Gas Company to raise additional capital purchase other lands and for other purposes incident thereto.
Great Northern Railway (Ireland) Act 1891	54 & 55 Vict. c. xcii	3 July 1891
An Act to confer further powers on the Great Northern Railway Company (Ireland).
Western Valleys (Monmouthshire) Water Act 1891	54 & 55 Vict. c. xciii	3 July 1891
An Act for incorporating the Western Valleys (Monmouthshire) Water Company and empowering them to construct Waterworks and supply Water and for other purposes.
Dundee Water Act 1891 (repealed)	54 & 55 Vict. c. xciv	3 July 1891
An Act to empower the Dundee Water Commissioners to extend, enlarge and alter their Lintrathen Reservoir and Works connected therewith; and to construct additional Aqueducts, Conduits or Lines of Pipes, and other works; and for other purposes. (Repealed by Dundee Corporation (Water, Transport, Finance, &c.) Order Confirmation Act 1954 (2 & 3 Eliz. 2. c. ix))
Southampton Harbour Act 1891	54 & 55 Vict. c. xcv	3 July 1891
An Act to confer further powers upon the Southampton Harbour Board and for other purposes.
Malvern Water Act 1891	54 & 55 Vict. c. xcvi	3 July 1891
An Act to authorise the Malvern Local Board to construct additional Waterworks for the supply of Water to their district and for other purposes.
Sun Insurance Office Act 1891	54 & 55 Vict. c. xcvii	3 July 1891
An Act to repeal and re-enact with amendments the Sun Fire Office Acts 1813 (Note: Sun Fire Office Company Act 1813 (54 Geo. 3. c. ix)) and 1827 (Note: Sun Fire Office Company Act 1827 (7 & 8 Geo. 4. c. xxii)) to make further provisions in relation to the Laws Objects Regulations and Capital of the Company to change the name of the Company and for other purposes.
Belfast and County Down Railway Act 1891	54 & 55 Vict. c. xcviii	3 July 1891
An Act to enable the Belfast and County Down Railway Company to construct a new Railway to widen and improve portions of their existing Railway to purchase additional lands and to raise additional capital and for other purposes.
Lancashire and Yorkshire Railway Act 1891	54 & 55 Vict. c. xcix	3 July 1891
An Act for conferring further powers on the Lancashire and Yorkshire Railway Company and for other purposes.
Leicester Extension Act 1891 (repealed)	54 & 55 Vict. c. c	3 July 1891
An Act to extend the Borough of Leicester and for other purposes. (Repealed by Leicestershire Act 1985 (c. xvii))
Stourbridge Gas Act 1891	54 & 55 Vict. c. ci	3 July 1891
An Act to confer further powers on the Stourbridge Gas Company.
Rhyl Gas Act 1891	54 & 55 Vict. c. cii	3 July 1891
An Act for incorporating and conferring powers on the Rhyl Gas Company.
Caledonian Railway (Edinburgh and Leith Lines) Act 1891	54 & 55 Vict. c. ciii	3 July 1891
An Act for enabling the Caledonian Railway Company to make and maintain certain railways in Edinburgh and Leith to acquire lands to raise additional money and for other purposes.
Electric Lighting Orders Confirmation (No. 8) Act 1891	54 & 55 Vict. c. civ	3 July 1891
An Act to confirm certain Provisional Orders made by the Board of Trade under the Electric Lighting Acts, 1882 and 1888, relating to Birmingham, Cardiff, Exeter, Ipswich (Ipswich Electricity Supply Company), Ipswich (Laurence, Scott, and Co.), and Whitby.
	Birmingham Electric Light and Power Order 1891 Provisional Order under the Electric Lighting Acts 1882 and 1888 granted by the Board of Trade to the Birmingham Electric Supply Company Limited in respect of parts of the City of Birmingham.	
	Cardiff Electric Lighting Order 1891 Provisional Order granted by the Board of Trade under the Electric Lighting Acts 1882 and 1888 to the Mayor Aldermen and Burgesses of the County Borough of Cardiff in respect of the said County Borough.	
	Exeter Electric Lighting Order 1891 Provisional Order granted by the Board of Trade under the Electric Lighting Acts, 1882 and 1888, to the Exeter Electric Light Company, Limited, in respect of the City and County of the City of Exeter.	
	Ipswich Borough Electric Lighting Order 1891 Provisional Order granted by the Board of Trade under the Electric Lighting Acts, 1882 and 1888, to the Ipswich Electricity Supply Company, Limited, in respect of the Municipal Borough of Ipswich.	
	Ipswich Electric Lighting Order 1891 Provisional Order granted by the Board of Trade under the Electric Lighting Acts, 1882 and 1888, to Laurence, Scott and Co., Limited, in respect of the Borough of Ipswich.	
	Whitby Electric Lighting Order 1891 Provisional Order granted by the Board of Trade under the Electric Lighting Acts 1882 and 1888 to the Whithby District Local Board in respect of the Urban Sanitary District of Whitby in the North Riding of the County of York.	
Electric Lighting Orders Confirmation (No. 11) Act 1891	54 & 55 Vict. c. cv	3 July 1891
An Act to confirm certain Provisional Orders made by the Board of Trade under the Electric Lighting Acts, 1882 and 1888, relating to Newport (Mon.), Poole, and Weybridge.
	Newport (Mon.) Electric Lighting Order 1891 Provisional Order granted by the Board of Trade under the Electric Lighting Acts 1882 and 1888 to the Mayor Aldermen and Burgesses of the Borough of Newport in the County of Monmouth in respect of the said Borough of Newport.	
	Poole Electric Lighting Order 1891 Provisional Order granted by the Board of Trade under the Electric Lighting Acts 1882 and 1888 to the Brush Electrical Engineering Company Limited in respect of a portion of the Rural Sanitary District of Poole in the County of Dorset.	
	Weybridge Electric Supply Order 1891 Provisional Order granted by the Board of Trade under the Electric Lighting Acts 1882 and 1888 to the Weybridge Electric Supply Company Limited in respect of the Parish of Weybridge in the County of Surrey.	
Electric Lighting Orders Confirmation (No. 12) Act 1891	54 & 55 Vict. c. cvi	3 July 1891
An Act to confirm certain Provisional Orders made by the Board of Trade under the Electric Lighting Acts, 1882 and 1888, relating to Leeds and Newcastle-upon-Tyne.
	Leeds Electric Supply Order 1891 Provisionat Order authorising the Yorkshire House-to-House Electricity Company (Limited), to construct and maintain Electric Lines and Works, and to supply Electricity within the Borough of Leeds, in the County of York.	
	Newcastle-upon-Tyne Electric Lighting Order 1891 Provisional Order granted by the Board of Trade under the Electric Lighting Acts, 1882 and 1888, to the Newcastle and District Electric Lighting Company, Limited, in respect of the City of Newcastle-upon-Tyne.	
Local Government Board's Provisional Orders Confirmation (No. 11) Act 1891	54 & 55 Vict. c. cvii	3 July 1891
An Act to confirm certain Provisional Orders of the Local Government Board relating to the Urban Sanitary Districts of Hastings, Oldham, Rowley Regis, Southampton (two), Standish-with-Langtree, and West Ham, and to the Rural Sanitary District of the Stourbridge Union.
	Hastings Order 1891 Provisional Order for partially repealing and altering the Hastings Improvement Act, 1885. (Note: Hastings Improvement Act 1885 (48 & 49 Vict. c. cxcvi))	
	Oldham Order 1891 Provisional Order for altering certain Local Acts. (Note: Oldham Borough Improvement Act 1865 (28 & 29 Vict. c. cccxi)) (Note: Oldham Improvement Act 1880 (43 & 44 Vict. c. cxlvii)) (Note: Oldham Corporation Act 1886 (49 & 50 Vict. c. cxvii))	
	Rowley Regis Order 1891 Provisional Order to enable the Sanitary Authority for the Urban Sanitary District of Rowley Regis to put in force the Compulsory Clauses of the Lands Clauses Acts.	
	Southampton Order (1) 1891 Provisional Order to enable the Urban Sanitary Authority for the Borough of Southampton to put in force the Compulsory Clauses of the Lands Clauses Acts.	
	Southampton Order (2) 1891 Provisional Order for altering the Southampton Corporation Act, 1885. (Note: Southampton Corporation Act 1885 (48 & 49 Vict. c. clxx))	
	Standish with Langtree Order 1891 Provisional Order for altering the Liverpool Waterworks and Improvement Act, 1887. (Note: Liverpool Waterworks and Improvement Act 1887 (50 & 51 Vict. c. clxvii))	
	Stourbridge Union Order 1891 Provisional Order to enable the Sanitary Authority for the Rural Sanitary District of the Stourbridge Union to put in force the Compulsory Clauses of the Lands Clauses Acts.	
	West Ham Order 1891 Provisional Order for altering certain Local Acts. (Note: Local Board of Health for West Ham, in Essex, Extension of Powers Act 1867 (30 & 31 Vict. c. lvi)) (Note: West Ham Local Board Extension of Powers Act 1881 (44 & 45 Vict. c. lxxxi))	
Local Government Board's Provisional Orders Confirmation (Gas) Act 1891	54 & 55 Vict. c. cviii	3 July 1891
An Act to confirm certain Provisional Orders of the Local Government Board under the Gas and Water Works Facilities Act, 1870, (Note: Gas and Water Works Facilities Act 1870 (33 & 34 Vict. c. 70)) and the Public Health Act, 1875, (Note: Public Health Act 1875 (38 & 39 Vict. c. 55)) relating to the Urban Sanitary Districts of Richmond (Yorks) and Selby.
	Richmond (Yorkshire) Gas Order 1891 Provisional Order under the Gas and Water Works Facilities Act, 1870.	
	Selby Gas Order 1891 Provisional Order under the Gas and Water Works Facilities Act, 1870.	
Dunlop Order Confirmation Act 1891	54 & 55 Vict. c. cix	3 July 1891
An Act to confirm an Order of the Boundary Commissioners for Scotland relating to the parish of Dunlop, in the counties of Ayr and Renfrew.
	Dunlop (Ayrshire and Renfrewshire) Order 1891 Order by the Boundary Commissioners for Scotland. Counties of Ayr and Renfrew. Parish of Dunlop.	
Allotments Provisional Order Confirmation Act 1891	54 & 55 Vict. c. cx	3 July 1891
An Act to confirm a Provisional Order made by the County Council of Norfolk under the Allotments Acts, 1887 (Note: Allotments Act 1887 (50 & 51 Vict. c. 48)) and 1890, (Note: Allotments Act 1890 (53 & 54 Vict. c. 65)) relating to the Parish of Saint Faith's, in the Rural Sanitary District of the Saint Faith's Union.
	St. Faith's Union (Norfolk) Order 1891 County Council of Norfolk. Allotments Acts, 1887 and 1890. Saint Faith's Union.	
Cork (County and City) Court Houses Act 1891	54 & 55 Vict. c. cxi	3 July 1891
An Act to facilitate the rebuilding of the Court Houses for the county of Cork and city of Cork, and for other purposes.
Imperial Insurance Company Act 1891	54 & 55 Vict. c. cxii	21 July 1891
An Act to repeal the Acts relating to the Imperial Fire Insurance Company as from the date of its registration as a Limited Company and to re-enact parts of those Acts to change the name of the Company and for other purposes.
Plymouth, Devonport and South Western Junction Railway Act 1891	54 & 55 Vict. c. cxiii	21 July 1891
An Act to confer further powers on the Plymouth Devonport and South Western Junction Railway Company.
Manchester, Sheffield and Lincolnshire Railway (Various Powers) Act 1891	54 & 55 Vict. c. cxiv	21 July 1891
An Act to confer further powers on the Manchester Sheffield and Lincolnshire Railway Company in connexion with their Undertaking and the Undertakings of other Companies in which they are jointly interested and to authorise the Manchester South Junction and Altrincham Railway Company to construct a Railway and other works and for other purposes.
Liverpool, St. Helens and South Lancashire Railway Act 1891	54 & 55 Vict. c. cxv	21 July 1891
An Act to extend the time for the compulsory purchase of lands for certain railways authorised by the St Helens and Wigan Junction Railway Act 1885 (Note: St. Helens and Wigan Junction Railway Act 1885 (48 & 49 Vict. c. cxxi)) and the St Helens and Wigan Junction Railway Act 1886 (Note: St. Helens and Wigan Junction Railway Act 1886 (50 Vict. c. xxxiii)) and to provide for the issue of preference or guaranteed shares or stock and for other purposes.
Neath Harbour Act 1891	54 & 55 Vict. c. cxvi	21 July 1891
An Act to extend the time for the restoration and completion of works for enlarging and improving the Port and Harbour of Neath to confer further borrowing powers upon the Neath Harbour Commissioners and for other purposes.
Penmaenmawr Local Board Act 1891	54 & 55 Vict. c. cxvii	21 July 1891
An Act for conferring powers on the Local Board for the district of Penmaenmawr in the county of Carnarvon for the construction of additional Waterworks and the raising of moneys and in relation to the local government of the district and for other purposes.
Southwark and Vauxhall Water Act 1891	54 & 55 Vict. c. cxviii	21 July 1891
An Act to authorise the Southwark and Vauxhall Water Company to raise additional Capital and for other purposes.
Stourbridge Improvement Commissioners Act 1891	54 & 55 Vict. c. cxix	21 July 1891
An Act for amending the Stourbridge Improvement Act 1866 (Note: Stourbridge Improvement Act 1866 (29 & 30 Vict. c. clxix)) and conferring further powers on the Stourbridge Improvement Commissioners and for other purposes.
Great Western and Great Northern Junction Railway (Abandonment) Act 1891 (repealed)	54 & 55 Vict. c. cxx	21 July 1891
An Act for the abandonment of the Railways authorised by the Great Western and Great Northern Junction Railway Act 1888. (Note: Great Western and Great Northern Junction Railway Act 1888 (51 & 52 Vict. c. ccii)) (Repealed by Statute Law (Repeals) Act 2013 (c. 2))
South-western Railway Act 1891	54 & 55 Vict. c. cxxi	21 July 1891
An Act to confer further powers upon the London and South-western Railway Company and to make further provision with respect to their Undertaking and other Undertakings in which they are interested to enable the Company and the Midland Railway Company to widen parts of the Somerset and Dorset Railway and for other purposes.
Newark Corporation Act 1891	54 & 55 Vict. c. cxxii	21 July 1891
An Act to enable the Mayor Aldermen and Burgesses of the Borough of Newark to construct Waterworks and supply Water to the said Borough and adjacent places and to acquire the Undertaking of the Newark-upon-Trent Waterworks Company and for other purposes.
North Cornwall Railway Act 1891	54 & 55 Vict. c. cxxiii	21 July 1891
An Act for constituting a portion of the Railways authorised by the North Cornwall Railway Act 1882 (Note: North Cornwall Railway Act 1882 (45 & 46 Vict. c. ccliv)) a separate Undertaking and for other purposes.
Aberdeen Corporation Act 1891 (repealed)	54 & 55 Vict. c. cxxiv	21 July 1891
An Act to extend the Municipal Boundary of the City of Aberdeen to make further provisions with respect to the rates and assessments leviable by the Town Council to provide for the creation and issue of Corporation Stock and for other purposes. (Repealed by Aberdeen Corporation (Administration Finance, &c.) Order Confirmation Act 1940 (3 & 4 Geo. 6. c. iii))
Dover Harbour Act 1891 (repealed)	54 & 55 Vict. c. cxxv	21 July 1891
An Act to authorise the making of a Deep Water Harbour at Dover in substitution for the Deep Water Harbour now authorised to be made there and for other purposes. (Repealed by Dover Harbour Act 1953 (1 & 2 Eliz. 2. c. xxix))
London Assurance Act 1891 (repealed)	54 & 55 Vict. c. cxxvi	21 July 1891
An Act to repeal the Special Acts of the London Assurance and to make further provisions in relation to the laws objects and regulations of the London Assurance and for other purposes. (Repealed by London Assurance Act 1931 (21 & 22 Geo. 5. c. xv))
Clevedon Local Board Act 1891	54 & 55 Vict. c. cxxvii	21 July 1891
An Act to enable the Local Board for the District of Clevedon in the County of Somerset to acquire the Undertaking of the Clevedon Pier Company to make and maintain a new Pier Head and to make further provisions for the improvement and good government of their District and for other purposes.
Flamborough Head Tramways (Abandonment) Act 1891	54 & 55 Vict. c. cxxviii	21 July 1891
An Act for the abandonment of the Flamborough Head Tramways and for authorising the repayment of the money deposited for securing the completion thereof.
Bristol Gas Act 1891	54 & 55 Vict. c. cxxix	21 July 1891
An Act for conferring further Powers on the Bristol United Gaslight Company.
City of Glasgow Act 1891	54 & 55 Vict. c. cxxx	21 July 1891
An Act to extend the Boundaries of the City of Glasgow and for other purposes.
South Hampshire Railway and Pier Act 1891	54 & 55 Vict. c. cxxxi	21 July 1891
An Act to revive the Powers and extend the Time for the compulsory purchase of Lands for and for the completion of the Railways and Pier authorised by the Swindon Marlborough and Andover Railway Acts 1882 (Note: Swindon, Marlborough and Andover Railway Act 1882 (45 & 46 Vict. c. cxcv)) and 1883 (Note: Swindon Marlborough and Andover Railway Act 1883 (46 & 47 Vict. c. cxxi)) and the South Hampshire Railway and Pier Acts 1886 (Note: South Hampshire Railway and Pier Act 1886 (49 & 50 Vict. c. cxvi)) and 1889. (Note: South Hampshire Railway and Pier Act 1889 (52 & 53 Vict. c. cxcviii))
West Metropolitan Tramways Act 1891	54 & 55 Vict. c. cxxxii	21 July 1891
An Act to extend the time for the completion of the Tramways authorised by the West Metropolitan Tramways Act 1889 (Note: West Metropolitan Tramways Act 1889 (52 & 53 Vict. c. ccii)) and for other purposes.
Beverley and East Riding Railway (Abandonment) Act 1891 (repealed)	54 & 55 Vict. c. cxxxiii	21 July 1891
An Act for the Abandonment of the Beverley and East Riding Railway. (Repealed by Statute Law (Repeals) Act 2013 (c. 2))
Northallerton Waterworks Act 1891	54 & 55 Vict. c. cxxxiv	21 July 1891
An Act to empower the Northallerton Local Board to make Waterworks and supply Water and for other purposes.
Eastern and Midlands Railway (Extension of Time) Act 1891	54 & 55 Vict. c. cxxxv	21 July 1891
An Act to extend the time for the completion of the Mundesley Branch of the Eastern and Midlands Railway.
Edinburgh Municipal and Police (Amendment) Act 1891 (repealed)	54 & 55 Vict. c. cxxxvi	21 July 1891
An Act to amend the Acts relating to the Municipality and Police and Roads and Streets of the City and Royal Burgh of Edinburgh, and to confer further sanitary powers on the Magistrates and Council thereof; and for other purposes. (Repealed by Edinburgh Corporation Order Confirmation Act 1933 (24 & 25 Geo. 5. c. v))
London and North-western Railway Act 1891	54 & 55 Vict. c. cxxxvii	21 July 1891
An Act for conferring further powers upon the London and North-western Railway Company in relation to their own Undertaking and other Undertakings in which they are interested jointly with other Companies and also for conferring Powers upon the Great Western Railway Company the Central Wales and Carmarthen Junction Railway Company the Harrow and Stanmore Railway Company and other Railway Companies in relation to such other Undertakings and for vesting in the London and North-western Railway Company the Undertaking of the Central Wales and Carmarthen Junction Railway Company and for other purposes.
Manchester, Sheffield and Lincolnshire Railway Act 1891	54 & 55 Vict. c. cxxxviii	21 July 1891
An Act to authorise the Manchester Sheffield and Lincolnshire Railway Company to make deviation and other Railways to confer further powers on the Company and for other purposes.
Pontypool Local Board (Markets) Act 1891	54 & 55 Vict. c. cxxxix	21 July 1891
An Act to empower the Pontypool Local Board to establish and maintain markets and fairs and to acquire existing markets and market rights and for other purposes.
Shropshire Railways Act 1891	54 & 55 Vict. c. cxl	21 July 1891
An Act to extend the time for the purchase of land and for the completion of the Shropshire Railways to authorise the Shropshire Railways Company to create and issue additional Debenture Stock and for other purposes.
Furness Railway Act 1891	54 & 55 Vict. c. cxli	21 July 1891
An Act for conferring further powers on the Furness Railway Company.
Westminster Improvement Commissioners Winding-up Act 1891 (repealed)	54 & 55 Vict. c. cxlii	21 July 1891
An Act to wind up the affairs of the Westminster Improvement Commissioners and to distribute their Assets under the direction and control of the High Court and to dissolve the said Commissioners and for other purposes. (Repealed by Statute Law (Repeals) Act 2008 (c. 12))
Lynmouth Harbour Act 1891	54 & 55 Vict. c. cxliii	21 July 1891
An Act for the construction of a Wharf Pier and other works and formation of a Harbour at Lynmouth in the County of Devon and for other purposes.
Municipal Registration (Dublin and Belfast) Act 1891	54 & 55 Vict. c. cxliv	21 July 1891
An Act to accelerate the proceedings for the Registration of Burgesses in the Boroughs of Dublin and Belfast, and to alter certain dates and periods connected therewith.
Gas Orders Confirmation Act 1891	54 & 55 Vict. c. cxlv	21 July 1891
An Act to confirm certain Provisional Orders made by the Board of Trade under the Gas and Water Works Facilities Act, 1870, relating to Cirencester Gas, Godstone District Gas, Matlock and District Gas,. and Staines and Egham Gas.
	Cirencester Gas Order 1891 Order empowering the Cirencester Gas Company Limited to maintain and continue Gasworks and to manufacture and supply Gas in the Parishes of Cirencester and Stratton both in the county of Gloucester.	
	Godstone District Gas Order 1891 Order empowering the Godstone District Gas Company Limited to construct and maintain Gasworks, and to make and supply Gas within the parishes, districts and places of Godstone, Tandridge, Crowhurst, Blindley Heath, Lingfield, Dorman's Land and New Chapel, all in the County of Surrey.	
	Matlock and District Gas Order 1891 Order empowering the Matlock and District Gas Company Limited to maintain and continue Gasworks and to manufacture and supply Gas within the Parish of Matlock the Parish of Darley (consisting of North and South Darley) the Parish of Wensley and Snitterton and the Parish of Tansley all in the County of Derby.	
	Staines and Egham Gas Order 1891 Order empowering the Staines and Egham District Gas and Coke Company, Limited, to extend their Limits of Supply.	
Forfar Water Order Confirmation Act 1891	54 & 55 Vict. c. cxlvi	21 July 1891
An Act to confirm a Provisional Order under the General Police and Improvement (Scotland) Act, 1862, (Note: General Police and Improvement (Scotland) Act 1862 (25 & 26 Vict. c. 101)) relating to Forfar Water.
	Forfar Water Order 1891 Provisional Order relating to Forfar Water.	
Water Orders Confirmation Act 1891	54 & 55 Vict. c. cxlvii	21 July 1891
An Act to confirm certain Provisional Orders made by the Board of Trade under the Gas and Water Works Facilities Act, 1870, relating to Corsham Water, North Sussex Water, Rochford Rayleigh and Leigh Water, and Swaffham Water.
	Corsham Water Order 1891 Order empowering the Corsham Waterworks Company Limited to raise additional Capital.	
	North Sussex Water Order 1891 Order authorising the construction and maintenance of Waterworks and the supply of Water in parts of the Parish of Worth in the County of Sussex.	
	Rochford, Rayleigh and Leigh Water Order 1891 Order empowering the South East Essex Gas and Water Company, Limited, to construct and maintain Waterworks, and to supply Water within the Parishes of Rochford, Rayleigh, Leigh and Hockley, all in the County of Essex.	
	Swaffham Water Order 1891 Order empowering the Swaffham Waterworks Company, Limited, to maintain and continue Waterworks and to supply Water in the Parish of Swaffham in the County of Norfolk.	
Tramways Orders Confirmation (No. 1) Act 1891	54 & 55 Vict. c. cxlviii	21 July 1891
An Act to confirm certain Provisional Orders made by the Board of Trade under the Tramways Act, 1870, (Note: Tramways Act 1870 (33 & 34 Vict. c. 78)) relating to Bradford and Wyke Tramway, Church and Oswaldtwistle Tramways, and Matlock Tramway.
	Bradford and Wyke Tramway Order 1891 Order authorising the Construction of a Tramway in the Townships of North Bierley and Wyke, in the Parishes of Bradford and Birstall, in the West Riding of the County of York.	
	Church and Oswaldtwistle Tramways Order 1891 Order authorising the construction of Tramways in the Districts or Townships of Church and Oswaldthistle, in the Parish of Whalley, in the County of Lancaster.	
	Matlock Tramway Order 1891 Order authorising the construction of a Tramway in the Parish of Matlock in the County of Derby.	
Pier and Harbour Orders Confirmation (No. 2) Act 1891	54 & 55 Vict. c. cxlix	21 July 1891
An Act to confirm certain Provisional Orders made by the Board of Trade under the General Pier and Harbour Act, 1861, relating to Bangor, Blackpool (South), Blackpool (South Shore), Sligo, and Stonehaven.
	Bangor Harbour Order 1891 Order for amending the Bangor Harbour Order, 1863, and for authorising the construction of new works at Bangor, in the County of Down, and for other purposes.	
	Blackpool (South) Pier Order 1891 Order for the Extension of the Blackpool (South) Pier and other Works at Blackpool, in the County of Lancaster.	
	Blackpool (South Shore) Pier Order 1891 Order for the construction, maintenance, and regulation of a Pier at South Shore, Blackpool, in the County of Lancaster.	
	Sligo Harbour Order 1891 Order for amending the Sligo Harbour Act, 1877. (Note: Sligo Harbour Act 1877 (40 & 41 Vict. c. xxxv))	
	Stonehaven Harbour Order 1891 Order for the construction of Works at the Harbour of Stonehaven, in the County of Kincardine, and for the Maintenance and Regulation of the Harbour; and other purposes.	
Local Government Board (Ireland) Provisional Order Confirmation (No. 5) Act 1891	54 & 55 Vict. c. cl	21 July 1891
An Act to confirm a Provisional Order made by the Local Government Board for Ireland relating to the Town of Dundalk.
	Dundalk Joint Burial Board Provisional Order 1891 Dundalk Joint Burial Board. Provisional Order.	
Education Department Provisional Order Confirmation (London) Act 1891	54 & 55 Vict. c. cli	21 July 1891
An Act to confirm a Provisional Order made by the Education Department under the Elementary Education Act, 1870, to enable the School Board for London to put in force the Lands Clauses Consolidation Act, 1845, and the Acts amending the same.
	The School Board for London. Provisional Order for putting in force the Lands Clauses Consolidation Act, 1845.	
Gas and Water Orders Confirmation Act 1891	54 & 55 Vict. c. clii	21 July 1891
An Act to confirm certain Provisional Orders made by the Board of Trade under the Gas and Water Works Facilities Act, 1870, relating to Southborough Gas, Woking District Gas, Cirencester Water, Matlock Water, and Seaton and Beer Water.
	Southborough Gas Order 1891 Order empowering the Southborough Gas Light and Coke Company, Limited, to maintain and continue Gasworks, and to manufacture and supply Gas within parts of the parishes of Tonbridge, Bidborough and Speldhurst, all in the county of Kent.	
	Woking District Gas Order 1891 Order empowering the Woking District Gas Company Limited to construct and maintain Gasworks and to make and supply Gas within the parishes of Woking Horsell Send and Ripley Pyrford and Byfleet all in the county of Surrey.	
	Cirencester Water Order 1891 Order empowering the Cirencester Waterworks Company Limited to maintain and continue Waterworks and to supply Water in the Parishes of Cirencester Stratton and Coates all in the County of Gloucester.	
	Matlock Water Order 1891 Order empowering the Matlock Waterworks Company (Limited) to raise Additional Capital.	
	Seaton and Beer Water Order 1891 Order authorising the Construction and Maintenance of Waterworks and the supply of Water within the parish of Seaton and Beer in the county of Devon.	
Alloa, Alva and Logie Order Confirmation Act 1891	54 & 55 Vict. c. cliii	21 July 1891
An Act to confirm an Order of the Boundary Commissioners for Scotland relating to the parishes of Alloa, Alva, and Logie, in the counties of Clackmannan, Perth, and Stirling.
	Alloa, Alva and Logie (Clackmannan, Perth and Stirling) Order 1891 Order by the Boundary Commissioners for Scotland. Counties of Clackmannan, Perth and Stirling. Parishes of Alloa, Alva, and Logie.	
Cawdor, &c. Order Confirmation Act 1891	54 & 55 Vict. c. cliv	21 July 1891
An Act to confirm an Order of the Boundary Commissioners for Scotland relating to the parishes of Cawdor, Croy and Dalcross, Daviot and Dunlichity, Inverness, and Naim, in the counties of Inverness and Naim.
	Cawdor, Croy and Dalcross, Daviot and Dunlichity, Inverness and Nairn (Invernesshire and Nairnshire) Order 1891 Order by the Boundary Commissioners for Scotland. Counties of Inverness and Nairn. Parishes of Cawdor, Croy and Dalcross, Daviot and Dunlichity, Inverness, and Nairn.	
Kinnell, Lunan and Maryton Order Confirmation Act 1891	54 & 55 Vict. c. clv	21 July 1891 (Note: The Queen's Printers' copy incorrectly gives the date of royal assent as 31 August 1891, which is after the session had concluded.)
An Act to confirm an Order of the Boundary Commissioners for Scotland relating to the parishes of Kinnell, Lunan, and Maryton, in the county of Forfar.
	Kinnell, Lunan and Maryton (Forfarshire) Order 1891 Order by the Boundary Commissioners for Scotland. County of Forfar. Parishes of Kinnell, Lunan and Maryton.	
Local Government Board's Provisional Orders Confirmation (No. 7) Act 1891	54 & 55 Vict. c. clvi	21 July 1891
An Act to confirm certain Provisional Orders of the Local Government Board relating to the Urban Sanitary Districts of Ashton-under-Lyne (two), Blackpool, and York (two).
	Ashton-under-Lyne Order (1) 1891 Provisional Order for altering the Ashton-under-Lyne Improvement Act, 1886. (Note: Ashton-under-Lyne Improvement Act 1886 (49 & 50 Vict. c. lxxviii))	
	Ashton-under-Lyne Order (2) 1891 Provisional Order to enable the Urban Sanitary Authority for the Borough of Ashton-under-Lyne to put in force the Compulsory Clauses of the Lands Clauses Acts.	
	Blackpool Order 1891 Provisional Order to enable the Urban Sanitary Authority for the Borough of Blackpool to put in force the Compulsory Clauses of the Lands Clauses Acts.	
	York Order (1) 1891 Provisional Order for altering the York Extension and Improvement Act, 1884. (Note: York Extension and Improvement Act 1884 (47 & 48 Vict. c. ccxxxii))	
	York Order (2) 1891 Provisional Order to enable the Urban Sanitary Authority for the City of York to put in force the Compulsory Clauses of the Lands Clauses Acts.	
New or East Kilpatrick Order Confirmation Act 1891	54 & 55 Vict. c. clvii	21 July 1891
An Act to confirm an Order of the Boundary Commissioners for Scotland relating to the parish of New or East Kilpatrick in the counties of Dumbarton and Stirling.
	New or East Kilpatrick (Dumbartonshire and Stirlingshire) Order 1891 Order by the Boundary Commissioners for Scotland. Counties of Dumbarton and Stirling. Parish of New or East Kilpatrick.	
Local Government Board's Provisional Orders Confirmation (No. 12) Act 1891	54 & 55 Vict. c. clviii	28 July 1891
An Act to confirm certain Provisional Orders of the Local Government Board relating to the Urban Sanitary Districts of Barrow-in-Furness, Grimsby, Newton-in-Mackerfield, Reading, and Swindon New Town, to the Rural Sanitary District of the Burnley Union, and to the Wirral Joint Hospital District.
	Barrow-in-Furness Order 1891 Provisional Order for altering certain Local Acts. (Note: Barrow-in-Furness Corporation Act 1868 (31 & 32 Vict. c. civ)) (Note: Barrow-in-Furness Corporation Act 1875 (38 & 39 Vict. c. cciv)) (Note: Barrow-in-Furness Corporation Act 1881 (44 & 45 Vict. c. cxxi))	
	Grimsby Order 1891 Provisional Order to enable the Urban Sanitary Authority for the Borough of Grimsby to put in force the Compulsory Clauses of the Lands Clauses Acts.	
	Newton-in-Mackerfield Order 1891 Provisional Order for altering the Newton District Improvement Act, 1855. (Note: Newton District Improvement Act 1855 (18 & 19 Vict. c. c))	
	Reading Order 1891 Provisional Order for altering certain Local Acts. (Note: Reading Corporation Act 1881 (44 & 45 Vict. c. clxxi)) (Note: Reading Corporation Act 1887 (50 & 51 Vict. c. clxiii))	
	Swindon New Town Order 1891 Provisional Order to enable the Sanitary Authority for the Urban Sanitary District of Swindon New Town to put in force the Compulsory Clauses of the Lands Clauses Acts.	
	Burnley Union Order 1891 Provisional Order to enable the Sanitary Authority for the Rural Sanitary District of the Burnley Union to put in force the Compulsory Clauses of the Lands Clauses Acts.	
	Wirral Joint Hospital Order 1891 Provisional Order for partially repealing and altering Confirming Act. (Note: Local Government Board's Provisional Orders Confirmation (No. 4) Act 1888 (51 & 52 Vict. c. lxii))	
Pier and Harbour Order Confirmation (No. 3) Act 1891	54 & 55 Vict. c. clix	28 July 1891
An Act to confirm a Provisional Order made by the Board of Trade under the General Pier and Harbour Act, 1861, relating to Poole.
	Poole Harbour Order 1891 Order for amending an Act passed in the twenty-ninth year of the reign of His Majesty King George the Second, (Note: Poole Harbour Act 1756 (29 Geo. 2. c. 10)) relating to Poole Harbour, and for conferring further powers upon the Mayor, Aldermen, and Burgesses of the Borough of Poole.	
Pilotage Order Confirmation (No. 1) Act 1891 (repealed)	54 & 55 Vict. c. clx	28 July 1891
An Act to confirm a Provisional Order made by the Board of Trade under the Merchant Shipping Act Amendment Act, 1862, (Note: Merchant Shipping Act Amendment Act 1862 (25 & 26 Vict. c. 63)) relating to the Pilotage district of Bristol. (Repealed by Pilotage Orders Confirmation (No. 5) Act 1921 (11 & 12 Geo. 5. c. cxii))
	Bristol Pilotage Order 1891 Order for Exempting from Compulsory Pilotage, except within the Port of Bristol, Vessels bound to and from that Port.	
Local Government Board's Provisional Order Confirmation (No. 13) Act 1891 (repealed)	54 & 55 Vict. c. clxi	28 July 1891
An Act to confirm a Provisional Order of the Local Government Board relating to the City of Birmingham. (Repealed by West Midlands County Council Act 1980 (c. xi))
	City of Birmingham Order 1891 Provisional Order made in pursuance of Sections 54 and 59 of the Local Government Act, 1888.	
Tramways Orders Confirmation (No. 2) Act 1891	54 & 55 Vict. c. clxii	28 July 1891
An Act to confirm certain Provisional Orders made by the Board of Trade under the Tramways Act, 1870, relating to Bristol Tramways (Extension), and Liverpool Corporation Tramways (Extensions).
	Bristol Tramways (Extension) Order 1891 Order authorising the Bristol Tramways and Carriage Company, Limited, to construct Tramways in the City of Bristol and the neighbourhood thereof, in the Counties of Somerset and Gloucester, and for other purposes.	
	Liverpool Corporation Tramways (Extensions) Order 1891 Order authorising the Mayor Aldermen and Citizens of the City of Liverpool to construct additional Tramways in the said City.	
Local Government Board's Provisional Order Confirmation (Highways) Act 1891 (repealed)	54 & 55 Vict. c. clxiii	28 July 1891
An Act to confirm a Provisional Order of the Local Government Board, under the Highways and Locomotives (Amendment) Act, 1878, (Note: Highways and Locomotives (Amendment) Act 1878 (41 & 42 Vict. c. 77)) relating to the County of Berks. (Repealed by Berkshire Act 1986 (c. ii))
	Berks Order 1891 Provisional Order as to certain Disturnpiked Roads.	
Hull and Barnsley and South Yorkshire Junction Railways Act 1891	54 & 55 Vict. c. clxiv	28 July 1891
An Act to confirm and give effect to an agreement for the working of certain parts of the South Yorkshire Junction Railway by the Hull Barnsley and West Riding Junction Railway and Dock Company.
Handsworth Rectory Act 1891	54 & 55 Vict. c. clxv	28 July 1891
An Act for vesting in the Ecclesiastical Commissioners the endowments of the Rectory of Handsworth in the county of Stafford and for the re-endowment of the said Rectory and the transfer of the advowson to the See of Lichfield and for the endowment or augmentation of new districts within the parish of Handsworth aforesaid and for other purposes.
North Eastern Railway Act 1891	54 & 55 Vict. c. clxvi	28 July 1891
An Act to confer further powers on the North Eastern Railway Company and to enable the North Eastern Railway Company and the London and North Western Railway Company to enlarge Leeds New Station and for other purposes.
Freshwater, Yarmouth and Newport Railway Act 1891	54 & 55 Vict. c. clxvii	28 July 1891
An Act to empower the Freshwater Yarmouth and Newport Railway Company to raise further capital and for other purposes.
Harrow Road and Paddington Tramways Act 1891	54 & 55 Vict. c. clxviii	28 July 1891
An Act for empowering the Harrow Road and Paddington Tramways Company to construct New Tramways; and for other purposes.
Alloa Water Act 1891	54 & 55 Vict. c. clxix	28 July 1891
An Act to authorise the Police Commissioners of the Burgh of Alloa to provide an additional Water Supply to the Burgh and places adjacent; and to make and maintain new and additional Waterworks; and for other purposes.
Aire and Calder and Diver Dun Navigation Junction Canal Act 1891	54 & 55 Vict. c. clxx	28 July 1891
An Act to authorise the Undertakers of the Navigation of the Rivers of Aire and Calder in the West Riding of the County of York to make a new Canal from the River Dun Navigation to join the Knottingley and Goole Canal and to widen a portion of the last-mentioned Canal to provide for the Sheffield and South Yorkshire Navigation Company becoming joint owners of the new Canal and for other purposes.
Burry Port and Gwendreath Valley Railway Act 1891	54 & 55 Vict. c. clxxi	28 July 1891
An Act for conferring further powers upon the Burry Port and Gwendreath (Note: The name Gwendraeth was spelt incorrectly throughout the act.) Valley Railway Company.
Bournemouth East Cemetery Act 1891 (repealed)	54 & 55 Vict. c. clxxii	28 July 1891
An Act to enable the Corporation of Bournemouth to make and maintain a New Cemetery in the Parish of Christchurch. (Repealed by Bournemouth Borough Council Act 1985 (c. v))
Lostwithiel and Fowey Railway Act 1891	54 & 55 Vict. c. clxxiii	28 July 1891
An Act to confer further powers on the Lostwithiel and Fowey Railway Company and on other Companies and for other purposes.
Lincoln, Horncastle, Spilsby and Skegness Railway (Abandonment) Act 1891 (repealed)	54 & 55 Vict. c. clxxiv	28 July 1891
An Act for the abandonment of the Lincoln Horncastle Spilsby and Skegness Railway. (Repealed by Statute Law (Repeals) Act 2013 (c. 2))
Birmingham and Henley-in-Arden Railway Act 1891	54 & 55 Vict. c. clxxv	28 July 1891
An Act to extend the time tor the completion of the authorised railway of the Birmingham and Henley-in-Arden Railway Company and for other purposes.
Glasgow Corporation Act 1891	54 & 55 Vict. c. clxxvi	28 July 1891
An Act to authorise the use of electrical and other power on the Glasgow Street Tramways and for other purposes.
Leeds and Liverpool Canal Act 1891	54 & 55 Vict. c. clxxvii	28 July 1891
An Act to amend the Acts relating to and to confer further powers for the maintenance and construction of works and otherwise upon the Company of Proprietors of the Canal Navigation from Leeds to Liverpool to Change the Name of the Company; and for other purposes.
Rhondda and Swansea Bay Railway Act 1891	54 & 55 Vict. c. clxxviii	28 July 1891
An Act for authorising the Rhondda and Swansea Bay Railway Company to extend their Railways and for other purposes.
Dewsbury Improvement Act 1891 (repealed)	54 & 55 Vict. c. clxxix	28 July 1891
An Act to make further provision for the improvement health and good government of the Borough of Dewsbury and for other purposes. (Repealed by West Yorkshire Act 1980 (c. xiv))
Falmouth Water Act 1891 (repealed)	54 & 55 Vict. c. clxxx	28 July 1891
An Act to confer further powers on the Falmouth Waterworks Company. (Repealed by South Cornwall Water Board Order 1967 (SI 1967/1928))
Manchester Ship Canal Act 1891	54 & 55 Vict. c. clxxxi	28 July 1891
An Act to enable the Manchester Ship Canal Company to raise additional loan capital for the completion of their Undertaking and to authorise the Mayor Aldermen and Citizens of the City of Manchester in the County of Lancaster to lend money to the said Company and for that purpose to raise additional moneys by mortgage or the issue of Corporation Stock and to extend the time for the completion of the said Undertaking and for other purposes.
Worms and Balé's Patent Act 1891	54 & 55 Vict. c. clxxxii	28 July 1891
An Act for rendering valid certain Letters Patent granted to Eugène Worms of Paris in the Republic of France and Jean Balé of the same place Engineers for Improved Process and Apparatus for Tanning by aid of Electricity.
Great Western Railway Act 1891	54 & 55 Vict. c. clxxxiii	5 August 1891
An Act for conferring further powers upon the Great Western Railway Company in respect of their own undertaking and upon that Company and the London and North Western Railway Company in respect of undertakings in which they are jointly interested and for other purposes.
Barry Dock and Railways Act 1891 (repealed)	54 & 55 Vict. c. clxxxiv	5 August 1891
An Act to enable the Barry Dock and Railways Company to construct new Railways and for other purposes. (Repealed by Vale of Glamorgan (Barry Harbour) Act 1978 (c. xvii))
South Staffordshire Mines Drainage Act 1891	54 & 55 Vict. c. clxxxv	5 August 1891
An Act to vary and amend the provisions of the South Staffordshire Mines Drainage Acts 1873 to 1882.
Golden Valley Railway Act 1891	54 & 55 Vict. c. clxxxvi	5 August 1891
An Act to determine the rights of the Debenture Stockholders of the Golden Valley Railway Company and for other purposes.
Metropolitan Outer Circle Railway (Extension of Time) Act 1891 (repealed)	54 & 55 Vict. c. clxxxvii	5 August 1891
An Act to extend the time for the compulsory purchase of lands and for completing the Metropolitan Outer Circle Railway. (Repealed by Metropolitan Outer Circle Railway (Abandonment) Act 1895 (58 & 59 Vict. c. vi))
Bognor Water Act 1891	54 & 55 Vict. c. clxxxviii	5 August 1891
An Act for incorporating the Bognor Water Company and for enabling them to construct and maintain Waterworks and supply Water and for other purposes.
Lancashire, Derbyshire and East Coast Railway Act 1891	54 & 55 Vict. c. clxxxix	5 August 1891
An Act for making and maintaining Railways in the Counties of Chester Lancaster Derby Nottingham and Lincoln to be called the Lancashire Derbyshire and East Coast Railway and for other purposes.
Exeter, Teign Valley and Chagford Railway (Extension of Time) Act 1891	54 & 55 Vict. c. cxc	5 August 1891
An Act to revive the powers for the compulsory purchase of lands and to extend the time limited for the completion of the Exeter Teign Valley and Chagford Railway.
Hanover Chapel (Regent Street) Act 1891	54 & 55 Vict. c. cxci	5 August 1891
An Act to provide for the pulling down of the Parish Church of Hanover Chapel (Regent Street) and building a new Parish Church instead thereof and for other purposes.
North British Railway (Waverley Station, &c.) Act 1891	54 & 55 Vict. c. cxcii	5 August 1891
An Act to authorise the North British Railway Company to construct and widen certain Railways divert Streets and construct a new Street and acquire Lands for the purpose of enlarging and improving their Waverley Passenger and Goods Station at Edinburgh and for other purposes.
Caledonian Railway (Additional Powers) Act 1891	54 & 55 Vict. c. cxciii	5 August 1891
An Act for enabling the Caledonian Railway Company to make and maintain certain Railways in the County of Lanark and to abandon a portion of the Glasgow Central Railway to increase their subscriptions to the Undertaking of the Lanarkshire and Ayrshire Railway Company for reviving the powers of purchase of lands for and extending the time for the completion of certain Railways and Works for authorising the purchase of the Shield Hall Branch Railway by the Caledonian and Glasgow and South Western Railway Companies for modifying certain of the rights of the North Eastern and Great Northern Railway Companies in connexion with the Scottish Central and Scottish North Eastern Railways and for other purposes.
Glasgow, Yoker and Clydebank Railway Act 1891 (repealed)	54 & 55 Vict. c. cxciv	5 August 1891
An Act to authorise the Glasgow Yoker and Clydebank Railway Company to make a Branch Railway in the Parish of Old Kilpatrick and for other purposes. (Repealed by Glasgow, Yoker, and Clydebank Railway Act 1893 (56 & 57 Vict. c. clxxiv))
Wolverhampton Corporation Act 1891 (repealed)	54 & 55 Vict. c. cxcv	5 August 1891
An Act for amending the Powers of the Corporation of Wolverhampton in regard to their sewage outfall and the disposal of their sewage and for other purposes. (Repealed by Wolverhampton Corporation Act 1969 (c. lx))
Central London Railway Act 1891	54 & 55 Vict. c. cxcvi	5 August 1891
An Act for incorporating the Central London Railway Company and for empowering them to construct underground railways from Shepherd's Bush to the City of London and for other purposes.
Glasgow and South Western Railway (Steam Vessels) Act 1891	54 & 55 Vict. c. cxcvii	5 August 1891
An Act to authorise the Glasgow and South Western Railway Company to provide and use Steam Vessels between Ports and Places in the River and Firth of Clyde.
Leeds and Yeadon Railway Act 1891 (repealed)	54 & 55 Vict. c. cxcviii	5 August 1891
An Act to authorise the Guiseley Yeadon and Rawdon Railway Company to extend their Railway to the North Eastern Railway near Headingley and for other purposes. (Repealed by Statute Law (Repeals) Act 2013 (c. 2))
Keighley Corporation Act 1891	54 & 55 Vict. c. cxcix	5 August 1891
An Act to extend the time for the construction of certain waterworks authorised by the Keighley Waterworks Extension and Improvement Act 1869 (Note: Keighley Waterworks Extension and Improvement Act 1869 (32 & 33 Vict. c. cxxix)) to authorise the Corporation of Keighley to construct additional waterworks to make better provision for the health local government and improvement of the borough and for other purposes.
Kirkcaldy and District Railways Act 1891	54 & 55 Vict. c. cc	5 August 1891
An Act to authorise the Kirkcaldy and District Railway Company to make a new Railway to extend the time limited for the completion of their authorised Railways Dock and Works and for other purposes.
Lanarkshire and Dumbartonshire Railway Act 1891	54 & 55 Vict. c. cci	5 August 1891
An Act to authorise the construction of a Railway from the Caledonian Railway at Glasgow to Dumbarton with subsidiary lines and other works in connexion therewith and for other purposes.
London, Tilbury and Southend Railway Act 1891	54 & 55 Vict. c. ccii	5 August 1891
An Act to confer further Powers on the London Tilbury and Southend Railway Company.
North British Railway (General Powers) Act 1891	54 & 55 Vict. c. cciii	5 August 1891
An Act to authorise the North British Railway Company to construct certain new Railways in the Counties of Dumbarton Lanark and Stirling to widen their Arbroath and Montrose Railway and to execute other works to acquire additional lands to amalgamate the Blane Valley and the Strathendrick and Aberfoyle Railway Companies respectively with the Company to acquire the Port and Harbour of Alloa to purchase the Whiteinch Railway and adapt the same for passenger traffic to vary the powers of the Eyemouth Railway Company and for other purposes.
Rotherham, Blyth and Sutton Railway Act 1891	54 & 55 Vict. c. cciv	5 August 1891
An Act to authorise the construction of a Railway in the West Riding of the County of York, and in the County of Nottingham, from Rotherham through Blyth to Sutton, with a Branch to Treeton, and for other purposes.
Tottenham and Wood Green Sewerage Act 1891 (repealed)	54 & 55 Vict. c. ccv	5 August 1891
An Act to provide for the reception of Sewage from Tottenham and Wood Green in the County of Middlesex into the Main Drainage System of the London County Council and for other purposes. (Repealed by Local Law (North West London Boroughs) Order 1965 (SI 1965/533))
London Council (General Powers) Act 1891	54 & 55 Vict. c. ccvi	5 August 1891
An Act to confer powers on the London County Council for the reconstruction of Bridges the improvement of Streets and the acquisition and management of Land for various purposes in the Administrative County of London to provide for contributions by Local Bodies towards the cost of certain Works to empower the Council to grant Superannuation Allowances in certain cases to establish a Provident Fund for officers and servants and to hold inquiries as to Markets and for other Purposes.
Manchester Corporation Act 1891	54 & 55 Vict. c. ccvii	5 August 1891
An Act to enable the Mayor Aldermen and Citizens of the City of Manchester to establish and contribute towards a Fund for the encouragement of Thrift amongst their Officers and Servants to confer upon them further powers and make further provision with respect to the improvement health and good government of the City to provide for vesting in the said Mayor Aldermen and Citizens as an open space the St. Michael's disused Burial Ground to amend and extend the provisions of the Local Acts relating to the City of Manchester and for other purposes.
Shropshire Mineral (Light) Railway Act 1891	54 & 55 Vict. c. ccviii	5 August 1891
An Act to authorise the construction of a Railway in extension of the Snailbeach District Railway in the County of Salop and for other purposes.
London, Deptford and Greenwich Tramways Act 1891	54 & 55 Vict. c. ccix	5 August 1891
An Act for empowering the Southwark and Deptford Tramways Company to construct New Tramways and to change the Name of the Company and for other purposes.
Local Government Board's Provisional Orders Confirmation (No. 9) Act 1891	54 & 55 Vict. c. ccx	5 August 1891
An Act to confirm certain Provisional Orders of the Local Government Board relating to the Boroughs of Basingstoke and Newport.
	Borough of Basingstoke Order 1891 Provisional Order made in pursuance of Sections 54 and 59 of the Local Government Act, 1888.	
	Borough of Newport Order 1891 Provisional Order made in pursuance of Sections 54 and 59 of the Local Government Act, 1888.	
Local Government Board's Provisional Orders Confirmation (No. 14) Act 1891	54 & 55 Vict. c. ccxi	5 August 1891
An Act to confirm certain Provisional Orders of the Local Government Board relating to the Urban Sanitary Districts of Blackpool, Leicester (two), Salford, Stafford, West Ham, and Worthing, and to the Conway and Colwyn Bay Joint Water Supply District.
	Blackpool Order (2) 1891 Provisional Order for altering the Blackpool Improvement Act, 1879. (Note: Blackpool Improvement Act 1879 (42 & 43 Vict. c. cxcix))	
	Conway and Colwyn Bay Joint Water Supply Order 1891 Provisivnal Order for forming a United District under Section 279 of the Public Health Act, 1875.	
	Leicester Order 1891 Provisional Order for altering the Leicester Improvement, Drainage, and Markets Act, 1868. (Note: Leicester Improvement, Drainage and Markets Act 1868 (31 & 32 Vict. c. xxiv))	
	Leicester Order (2) 1891 Provisional Order for altering the Leicester Corporation Gas and Water Transfer Act, 1878. (Note: Leicester Corporation Gas and Water Transfer Act 1878 (41 & 42 Vict. c. cxxxii))	
	Salford Order 1891 Provisional Order for altering certain Local Acts. (Note: Salford Improvement Act 1862 (25 & 26 Vict. c. ccv)) (Note: Salford Improvement Act 1867 (30 & 31 Vict. c. lviii)) (Note: Salford Improvement Act 1870 (33 & 34 Vict. c. cxxix)) (Note: Salford Improvement Act 1871 (34 & 35 Vict. c. cx)) (Note: Salford Tramways and Improvement Act 1875 (38 & 39 Vict. c. ci))	
	Stafford Order (2) 1891 Provisional Order for altering the Stafford Corporation Act, 1876, (Note: Stafford Corporation Act 1876 (39 & 40 Vict. c. cxcvi)) and a Confirming Act. (Note: Local Government Board's Provisional Orders Confirmation (No. 3) Act 1882 (45 & 46 Vict. c. lxi))	
	West Ham Order (2) 1891 Provisional Order to enable the Urban Sanitary Authority for the Borough of West Ham to put in force the Compulsory Clauses of the Lands Clauses Acts.	
	Worthing Order 1891 Provisional Order for altering a Local Act, (Note: Worthing and Lancing Turnpike Road and Sea Defences Act 1826 (7 Geo. 4. c. x)) and certain Confirming Acts. (Note: Local Government Supplemental Act 1869 (32 & 33 Vict. c. cxxiv)) (Note: Local Government Board's Provisional Orders Confirmation (Bath, &c.) Act 1876 (39 & 40 Vict. c. cci))	
Electric Lighting Orders Confirmation (No. 10) Act 1891	54 & 55 Vict. c. ccxii	5 August 1891
An Act to confirm certain Provisional Orders made by the Board of Trade under the Electric Lighting Acts, 1882 and 1888, relating to the City of London, Clerkenwell, St. Luke, Chelsea, St. Luke, Middlesex, and Woolwich.
	City of London Electric Lighting (Brush) Order 1891 Provisional Order granted by the Board of Trade, under the Electric Lighting Acts, 1882 and 1888, to the Brush Electrical Engineering Company, Limited, in respect of the Western District of the City of London.	
	Clerkenwell Electric Lighting Order 1891 Provisional Order granted by the Board of Trade under the Electric Lighting Acts, 1882 and 1888, to the Brush Electrical Engineering Company, Limited, in respect of the parish of St. James and St. John, Clerkenwell.	
	St. Luke, Chelsea, Electric Lighting Order 1891 Provisional Order granted by the Board of Trade under the Electric Lighting Acts, and 1888, to the New Cadogan and Belgrave Electric Supply Company, Limited, in respect of a part of the parish of St. Luke, Chelsea.	
	St. Luke, Middlesex, Electric Lighting Order 1891 Provisional Order granted by the Board of Trade under the Electric Lighting Acts, 1882 and 1888, to the Brush Electrical Engineering Company, Limited, in respect of the parish of St. Luke, Middlesex.	
	Woolwich Electric Lighting Order 1891 Provisional Order granted by the Board of Trade under the Electric Lighting Acts, 1882 and 1888, to the Woolwich District Electric Light Company, Limited, in respect of the Parish of Woolwich in the County of London.	
Local Government Board's Provisional Orders Confirmation (Housing of Working Classes) Act 1891	54 & 55 Vict. c. ccxiii	5 August 1891
An Act to confirm certain Provisional Orders of the Local Government Board under the Housing of the Working Classes Act, 1890, relating to the Urban Sanitary Districts of Brighton and Salford.
	Brighton Order 1891 Provisional Order for confirming an Improvement Scheme under Part 1. of the Housing of the Working Classes Act, 1890.	
	Salford Order 1891 Provisional Order for confirming an Improvement Scheme under Part 1. of the Housing of the Working Classes Act, 1890.	
Great Eastern Railway Company (Rates and Charges) Order Confirmation Act 1891 (repealed)	54 & 55 Vict. c. ccxiv	5 August 1891
An Act to confirm a Provisional Order made by the Board of Trade under the Railway and Canal Traffic Act, 1888, (Note: Railway and Canal Traffic Act 1888 (51 & 52 Vict. c. 25)) containing the Classification of Merchandise Traffic, and the Schedule of Maximum Rates and Charges applicable thereto, of the Great Eastern Railway Company, and certain other Railway Companies connected therewith. (Repealed by Statute Law (Repeals) Act 2013 (c. 2))
	Great Eastern Railway Company (Rates and Charges) Order 1891 Order of the Board of Trade under the Railway and Canal Traffic Act, 1888, embodying the classification of merchandise traffic and the authorised schedule of maximum rates and charges, including all terminal charges applicable to the said classification of the Great Eastern Railway Company, and certain other railway companies connected therewith.	
Great Northern Railway Company (Rates and Charges) Order Confirmation Act 1891 (repealed)	54 & 55 Vict. c. ccxv	5 August 1891
An Act to confirm a Provisional Order made by the Board of Trade under the Railway and Canal Traffic Act, 1888, containing the Classification of Merchandise Traffic, and the Schedule of Maximum Rates and Charges applicable thereto, of the Great Northern Railway Company, and certain other Railway Companies connected therewith. (Repealed by Statute Law (Repeals) Act 2013 (c. 2))
	Great Northern Railway Company (Rates and Charges) Order 1891 Order of the Board of Trade under the Railway and Canal Traffic Act, 1888, embodying the Classification of Merchandise Traffic and the authorised Schedule of Maximum Rates and Charges, including all Terminal Charges applicable to the said Classification of the Great Northern Railway Company, and certain other Railway Companies connected therewith.	
London and South Western Railway Company (Rates and Charges) Order Confirmation Act 1891 (repealed)	54 & 55 Vict. c. ccxvi	5 August 1891
An Act to confirm a Provisional Order made by the Board of Trade under the Railway and Canal Traffic Act, 1888, containing the Classification of Merchandise Traffic, and the Schedule of Maximum Rates and Charges applicable thereto, of the London and South Western Railway Company, and certain other Railway Companies connected therewith. (Repealed by Statute Law (Repeals) Act 2013 (c. 2))
	London and South Western Railway Company (Rates and Charges) Order 1891 Order of the Board of Trade under the Railway and Canal Traffic Act, 1888, embodying the Classification of Merchandise Traffic and the authorised Schedule of Maximum Rates and Charges, including all Terminal Charges applicable to the said Classification of the London and South Western Railway Company, and certain other Railway Companies connected therewith.	
London, Brighton and South Coast Railway Company (Rates and Charges) Order Confirmation Act 1891 (repealed)	54 & 55 Vict. c. ccxvii	5 August 1891
An Act to confirm a Provisional Order made by the Board of Trade under the Railway and Canal Traffic Act, 1888, containing the Classification of Merchandise Traffic, and the Schedule of Maximum Rates and Charges applicable thereto, of the London, Brighton, and South Coast Railway Company, and certain other Railway Companies connected therewith. (Repealed by Statute Law (Repeals) Act 2013 (c. 2))
	London, Brighton and South Coast Railway Company (Rates and Charges) Order 1891 Order of the Board of Trade under the Railway and Canal Traffic Act, 1888, embodying the classification of merchandise traffic and the authorised schedule of maximum rates and charges, including all terminal charges applicable to the said classification of the London, Brighton, and South Coast Company, and certain other railway companies connected therewith.	
London, Chatham and Dover Railway Company (Rates and Charges) Order Confirmation Act 1891 (repealed)	54 & 55 Vict. c. ccxviii	5 August 1891
An Act to confirm a Provisional Order made by the Board of Trade under the Railway and Canal Traffic Act, 1888, containing the Classification of Merchandise Traffic, and the Schedule of Maximum Rates and Charges applicable thereto, of the London, Chatham, and Dover Railway Company, and certain other Railway Companies connected therewith. (Repealed by Statute Law (Repeals) Act 2013 (c. 2))
	London, Chatham and Dover Railway Company (Rates and Charges) Order 1891 Order of the Board of Trade under the Railway and Canal Traffic Act, 1888, embodying the Classification of Merchandise Traffic and the authorised Schedule of Maximum Rates and Charges, including all Terminal Charges applicable to the said Classification of the London, Chatham and Dover Railway Company, and certain other Railway Companies connected therewith.	
Midland Railway Company (Rates and Charges) Order Confirmation Act 1891 (repealed)	54 & 55 Vict. c. ccxix	5 August 1891
An Act to confirm a Provisional Orders made by the Board of Trade under the Railway and Canal Traffic Act, 1888, containing the Classification of Merchandise Traffic, and the Schedule of Maximum Rates and Charges applicable thereto, of the Midland Railway Company, and certain other Railway Companies connected therewith. (Repealed by Statute Law (Repeals) Act 2013 (c. 2))
	Midland Railway Company (Rates and Charges) Order 1891 Order of the Board of Trade under the Railway and Canal Traffic Act, 1888, embodying the classification of merchandise traffic and the authorised schedule of maximum rates and charges, including all terminal charges applicable to the said classification of the Midland Railway Company, and certain other railway companies connected therewith.	
South-Eastern Railway Company (Rates and Charges) Order Confirmation Act 1891 (repealed)	54 & 55 Vict. c. ccxx	5 August 1891
An Act to confirm a Provisional Order made by the Board of Trade under the Railway and Canal Traffic Act, 1888, containing the Classification of Merchandise Traffic, and the Schedule of Maximum Rates and Charges applicable thereto, of the South-Eastern Railway Company, and certain other Railway Companies connected therewith. (Repealed by Statute Law (Repeals) Act 2013 (c. 2))
	South-Eastern Railway Company (Rates and Charges) Order 1891 Order of the Board of Trade under the Railway and Canal Traffic Act, 1888, embodying the Classification of Merchandise Traffic and the authorised Schedule of Maximum Rates and Charges, including all Terminal Charges applicable to the said Classification of the South-Eastern Railway Company, and certain other Railway Companies connected therewith.	
London and North Western Railway Company (Rates and Charges) Order Confirmation Act 1891 (repealed)	54 & 55 Vict. c. ccxxi	5 August 1891
An Act to confirm a Provisional Order made by the Board of Trade under the Railway and Canal Traffic Act, 1888, containing the Classification of Merchandise Traffic, and the Schedule of Maximum Rates and Charges applicable thereto, of the London and North Western Railway Company, and certain other Railway Companies connected therewith. (Repealed by Statute Law (Repeals) Act 2013 (c. 2))
	London and North Western Railway Company (Rates and Charges) Order 1891 Order of the Board of Trade under the Railway and Canal Traffic Act, 1888, embodying the Classification of Merchandise Traffic and the authorised Schedule of Maximum Rates and Charges, including all Terminal Charges applicable to the said Classification of the London and North Western Railway Company, and certain other Railway Companies connected therewith.	
Great Western Railway Company (Rates and Charges) Order Confirmation Act 1891 (repealed)	54 & 55 Vict. c. ccxxii	5 August 1891
An Act to confirm a Provisional Order made by the Board of Trade under the Railway and Canal Traffic Act, 1888, containing the Classification of Merchandise Traffic, and the Schedule of Maximum Rates and Charges applicable thereto, of the Great Western Railway Company, and certain other Railway Companies connected therewith. (Repealed by Statute Law (Repeals) Act 2013 (c. 2))
	Great Western Railway Company (Rates and Charges) Order 1891 Order of the Board of Trade under the Railway and Canal Traffic Act, 1888, embodying the classification of merchandise traffic and the authorised schedule of maximum rates and charges, including all terminal charges applicable to the said classification of the Great Western Railway Company, and certain other railway companies connected therewith.	
Local Government Board's Provisional Orders Confirmation (No. 15) Act 1891	54 & 55 Vict. c. ccxxiii	5 August 1891
An Act to confirm certain Provisional Orders of the Local Government Board relating to the Boroughs of Burslem, Middleton, and Morley.
	Borough of Burslem Order 1891 Provisional Order made in pursuance of Sections 54 and 59 of the Local Government Act, 1888.	
	Borough of Middleton Order 1891 Provisional Order made in pursuance of Sections 54 and 59 of the Local Government Act, 1888.	
	Borough of Morley Order 1891 Provisional Order made in pursuance of Sections 54 and 59 of the Local Government Act, 1888.	

=== Private and personal acts ===
Short title	Citation	Royal assent
Long title
Flowers Estate Act 1891	54 & 55 Vict. c. 1 Pr.	28 July 1891
An Act to enable the Trustees of the Will of Philip William Flower deceased to postpone the sale and conversion of certain Real Estates held on the trusts of his Will and give them powers with reference thereto.
Walker's Estate Act 1891	54 & 55 Vict. c. 2 Pr.	5 August 1891
An Act to confer powers on the Executors and Trustees of the Will of the late Thomas Andrew Walker in relation to his real and personal estate and various contracts entered into by him for the execution of public works.

=== Sources ===
- The Public General Statutes, Volume 28: 54 & 55 Victoria – 1891. Vol. 28. 17 May 1891 – via Internet Archive.
- Public General Statutes. Vol. 28. H.M. Stationery Office. 1891 – via Google Books.

== See also ==
- List of acts of the Parliament of the United Kingdom
