= Tunbridge Wells power station =

Historic power station

- Country: England
- Location: Tunbridge Wells
- Coordinates: 51°08′24″N 00°16′09″E
- Status: Decommissioned and demolished
- Construction began: 1893
- Commission date: 7 August 1895
- Decommission date: 1968
- Owners: Tunbridge Wells Corporation (1891–1948), British Electricity Authority (1948–55), Central Electricity Authority (1955–57), Central Electricity Generating Board (1958–68)
- Operators: Tunbridge Wells Corporation (1891–1948), British Electricity Authority (1948–55), Central Electricity Authority (1955–57), Central Electricity Generating Board (1958–68)

Thermal power station
- Primary fuel: Coal
- Turbine technology: Reciprocating engines and steam turbines
- Cooling towers: 3

Power generation
- Nameplate capacity: 11.25 MW
- Annual net output: 7,502 MWh (1946)

Tunbridge Wells power station supplied electricity to the town of Royal Tunbridge Wells and the surrounding area from 1895 to 1968. The power station was built by the Tunbridge Wells Corporation which operated it until the nationalisation of the British electricity supply industry in 1948.

== History ==
Tunbridge Wells Corporation applied in 1891 for a provisional order under the Electric Lighting Acts to generate and supply electricity to the town of Tunbridge Wells. The Tunbridge Wells Electric Lighting Order 1891 was granted by the Board of Trade and was confirmed by Parliament through the Electric Lighting Orders Confirmation (No. 5) Act 1891 (54 & 55 Vict. c. lxii).

The power station in Quarry Road/Medway Road was commissioned on 7 August 1895. The system being single-phase a.c. 67.5 cycles and the generated pressure of 2,000 volts was transformed in distributing transformers at 220 Volts. The site was adjacent to the railway for delivery of coal. The company charged 6d. and 3d./kWh and sold 258,641 kWh in 1898.

The plant was added to from time to time with the first turbo-alternator having been installed in 1910, and in 1923 the total capacity of the undertaking was 2,200 kW.

In 1923 the station was heavily modified with all the old plant removed except a 1,000 kW turbo alternator set installed in 1922. The final installation will consist of three 3,000-kW and two Brush-Ljungstrém 1,500 kW turbo-alternators 6,600-V, 3-phase, 50-cycle generating sets with six boilers of 25,000 Ib. of steam capacity each.

Further plant was added to meet growing demand for electricity. Over the period 1924–1928 the plant was renewed, giving a total generating capacity of 11.25 MW.

The Central Electricity Board built the first stages of the National Grid between 1927 and 1933. Tunbridge Wells power station were connected to the 132 kV electricity grid.

The British electricity supply industry was nationalised in 1948 under the provisions of the Electricity Act 1947 (10 & 11 Geo. 6. c. 54). Tunbridge Wells electricity undertaking was abolished, ownership of Tunbridge Wells power station were vested in the British Electricity Authority, and subsequently the Central Electricity Authority and the Central Electricity Generating Board (CEGB). At the same time the electricity distribution and sales responsibilities of the Tunbridge Wells electricity undertaking were transferred to the South Eastern Electricity Board (SEEBOARD).

Following nationalisation Tunbridge Wells power station became part of the Tunbridge Wells electricity supply district.

Tunbridge Wells power station was closed in 1968.

== Equipment specification ==
=== Plant in 1898 ===
The electricity plant in 1898 comprised Willans and Ferranti engines coupled directly to Goolden and Ferranti dynamos, with a total capacity of 304 kW.

=== Plant in 1923 ===
By 1923 the plant at Tunbridge Wells comprised boilers delivering a total of 43,000 lb/h (5.42 kg/s) of steam to:

- 1 × 300 kW turbo-alternator generating alternating current (AC)
- 1 × 400 kW reciprocating engine generating AC
- 1 × 500 kW turbo-alternator generating AC
- 1 × 1,000 kW turbo-alternator generating AC

The total generating capacity was 2,200 kW.

The following electricity supplies were available to consumers:

- 220 Volts 1-phase 67.5 Hz Alternating Current.

=== Plant in 1954 ===
By 1954 the plant (originally installed in 1924–28) comprised:

- Boilers:
  - 3 × Clayton and Shuttleworth boilers each of 22,500 lb/h (2.83 kg/s) capacity
  - 2 × Babcock and Wilcox boilers each of 26,400 lb/hr (3.33 kg/s) capacity

The total evaporative capacity was 120,300 lb/h (15.16 kg/s), steam conditions were 250 psi and 666 & 680 °F (17.2 bar and 352/360 °C), steam was supplied to:

- Generators:
  - 2 × 3.75 MW Brush-Ljungstrom turbo-alternators, 3-phase, 50 Hz, 6,600 volts
  - 2 × 1.875 MW Brush-Ljungstrom turbo-alternators, 3-phase, 50 Hz, 6,600 volts

The total installed generating capacity was 11.25 MW.

Condenser water was cooled in three wooden cooling towers of capacity 0.62 million gallons per hour (0.783 m^{3}/s).

== Operations ==
=== Operating data 1921–23 ===
The electricity supply data for the period 1921–23 was:

Tunbridge Wells power stations supply data 1921–23
Electricity Use	Units	Year		
Electricity Use	Units	1921	1922	1923
Lighting and domestic	MWh	943.1	1,079.1	1,409.7
Public lighting	MWh	119.6	127.7	235.6
Traction	MWh	0	0	0
Power	MWh	198.0	245.6	257.8
Bulk supply	MWh	0	0	0
Total supply	MWh	1,260.7	1,452.4	1,903.1

Electricity Loads on the system were:

Year		1921	1922	1923
Maximum load	kW	1,025	1,086	1,275
Total connections	kW	5,690	6,252	6,972
Load factor	Per cent	20.4	20.6	21.7

Revenue from the sale of current (in 1923) was £34,334; the surplus of revenue over expenses was £18,139.

=== Operating data 1946 ===
In 1946 Tunbridge Wells power station supplied 7,502 MWh of electricity; the maximum output load was 9,100 kW.

=== Operating data 1954–68 ===
Operating data for the period 1954–68 was:

Tunbridge Wells power station operating data, 1954–68
Year	Running hours, or (load as % of max capacity)	Max output capacity MW	Electricity supplied MWh	Thermal efficiency per cent
1954	617	9	1,833	9.27
1955	1262	9	6,108	12.26
1956	687	9	3,376	11.67
1957	490	9	2,134	10.42
1958	366	9	1,564	9.81
1961	(1.7%)	9	1,335	8.89
1962	(4.3 %)	9	3,417	10.31
1963	(6.93 %)	9	5,461	11.26
1965/6	(5.0 %)	9	3,931	10.51
1966/7	(1.1 %)	7	768	7.67
1967/8	(1.7 %)	7	1,042	8.47

== Tunbridge Wells Electricity District ==
Following nationalisation in 1948 Tunbridge Wells power station became part of the Tunbridge Wells electricity supply district, covering 202 square miles (523 km^{2}). The number of consumers and electricity sold in the Tunbridge Wells district was:

Year	1956	1957	1958
Number of consumers	43,532	44,932	46,191
Electricity sold MWh	120,701	132,911	141,164

In 1958 the number of units sold to categories of consumers was:

Type of consumer	No. of consumers	Electricity sold MWh
Domestic	41,300	89,587
Commercial	3,717	25,855
Industrial	533	18,613
Farms	625	6,049
Traction	0	0
Public lighting	16	1,060
Total	46,191	141,164

== Redevelopment ==
The power station in Stanley Road (51°08’24”N 0°16’09”E) was demolished, to the east of the site a 132 kV electricity sub-station is still operational.

In Commercial Road the boiler house, coaling facilities and sidings have been cleared but the engine house remains.

== See also ==
- Timeline of the UK electricity supply industry
- List of power stations in England
