= Southport power station =

Former power station in England

- Country: England
- Location: Southport
- Coordinates: 53°38′41″N 02°57′49″W
- Status: Decommissioned
- Construction began: 1891
- Commission date: 1894
- Decommission date: 1970
- Owners: Southport Corporation (1891–1948); British Electricity Authority (1948–1955); Central Electricity Authority (1955–1957); Central Electricity Generating Board (1958–1970)
- Operator: As owner

Thermal power station
- Primary fuel: Coal
- Secondary fuel: Fuel oil
- Turbine technology: Steam turbines
- Cooling towers: 3
- Cooling source: circulating water

Power generation
- Units operational: 1 x 7.7 MW, 2 x 3.85 MW, 1 x 1.85 MW
- Make and model: Brush-Ljungstrom
- Nameplate capacity: 17.25 MW
- Annual net output: 22,827 MWh (1946)

Southport power station supplied electricity to the town of Southport and the surrounding area from 1894 to the late 1960s. The power station was built by the Southport Corporation which operated it up to the nationalisation of the British electricity supply industry in 1948. Birkdale power station was operated by the Birkdale District Electric Supply Company Limited and originally supplied Birkdale Urban District until the district was incorporated into the Borough of Southport in 1911.

== History ==
Southport Corporation applied in 1891 for a provisional order under the Electric Lighting Acts to generate and supply electricity to the town of Southport. The Southport Electric Lighting Order 1891 was granted by the Board of Trade and was confirmed by Parliament through the Electric Lighting Orders Confirmation (No. 2) Act 1891 (54 & 55 Vict. c. l). A power station was built in Russell Road, Southport (53°38′41″N 2°57′49″W) and was commissioned in 1894. The corporation charged 7d./kWh and had 338 customers in 1897.

Provisional orders, the Birkdale Electric Lighting Order 1883 and the Birkdale Electric Lighting Order 1898, were granted to Birkdale District Electric Supply Company Limited to supply electricity to Birkdale. The company built a power station Grantham Road, Birkdale. Birkdale Urban District was incorporated into the borough of Southport in 1911, after which Birkdale power station was operated by Southport Corporation.

Southport Corporation Tramways operated a tramway service in Southport between 1900 and 1934, this was supplied with electric current by the Southport and Birkdale power stations.

The generating station at Southport was extended with new plant as demand for electricity grew.

There was a legal case in 1925–26 concerning certain clauses in agreements between the Southport Corporation and the Birkdale Electric Company regarding electricity supplies.

The Central Electricity Board built the first stages of the National Grid between 1927 and 1933. Southport power station was connected to an electricity grid ring which included the power stations at Ribble (Lancaster), Lister Drive (Liverpool), Warrington and Westwood (Wigan); this was one of three electricity rings in the North West. The others were Bolton, Padiham, Rawtenstall and Kearsley power stations ring; and the third was Manchester, Oldham, Tame Valley and Stockport ring.

The British electricity supply industry was nationalised in 1948 under the provisions of the Electricity Act 1947 (10 & 11 Geo. 6. c. 54). The Southport electricity undertaking was abolished, ownership of Southport and Birkdale power stations were vested in the British Electricity Authority, and subsequently the Central Electricity Authority and the Central Electricity Generating Board (CEGB). At the same time the electricity distribution and sales responsibilities of the Southport electricity undertaking were transferred to the North Western Electricity Board (NORWEB).

Following nationalisation Southport power station became part of the Southport electricity supply district.

Southport power station was closed in the late 1960s.

== Equipment specification ==
The 1894 lighting station originally contained three Mather & Platt dynamos driven by ropes from Browett-Lindley horizontal engines with an aggregate capacity of 250 HP. In 1895 and 1896 two Musgrave-Ferranti direct-driven sets of 250 HP each were added followed by a 500 HP set in 1897. These generate at 2000 Volts and were used power lighting in the town. In 1900 the first DC generating set of 200 kW for the tramway system was added using the existing boiler capacity.

=== Plant in 1923 ===
By 1923 the plant at Southport comprised boilers delivering 57,000 lb/h (7.2 kg/s) of steam to:

- 2 × 3,000 kW steam turbo-alternator (alternating current, AC).

The following electricity supplies were available to consumers:

- 380 & 190 Volts, 3-phase, 50 Hz AC
- 220 & 110 Volts, 1-phase, 50 Hz AC
- 500 Volts DC

In 1923 the plant at Birkdale comprised boilers delivering 20,600 lb/h (26.0 kg/s) of steam to:

- 1 × 350 kW reciprocating engine driving direct current (DC) generator
- 3 × 110 kW reciprocating engines driving direct current (DC) generators

There was also a 90 kW oil fuelled engine

The following electricity supplies were available to consumers:

- 550 Volts DC traction
- 460 & 230 Volt DC

=== Plant in 1954 ===
By 1954 the plant at Southport comprised:

- Boilers:
  - 2 × Vickers-Spearing 43,000 lb/h (5.4 kg/s) boilers
  - 1 × Vickers-Spearing 48,000 lb/h (6.05 kg/s) boiler
  - 1 × Yarrow 85,000 lb/h (10.71 kg/s) oil-fired boiler (commissioned October 1954)

Total evaporative capacity 219,000 lb/h (2706 kg/s), steam conditions were 260 psi and 720 °F (17.9 bar and 382 °C), steam was supplied to:

- Generators:
  - 1 × 7.7 MW Brush Ljungstrom turbo-alternator
  - 2 × 3.85 MW Brush Ljungstrom turbo-alternators
  - 1 × 1.85 MW Brush Ljungstrom turbo-alternator

The total installed capacity was 17.25 MW, 6.6 kV.

Condenser water was cooled by 2 × 0.15 million gallons per hour (682 m^{3}/h) Peter Brotherhood cooling towers and 1 × 0.3 million gallons per hour (1364 m^{3}/h ) induced draft cooling tower (commissioned December 1954) Water was supplied from land drainage works.

In 1954 the plant at Birkdale comprised a single 500 kW Fullagar diesel-English Electric set, generating 480 V DC.

== Operations ==
In 1897 Southport power station sold 376,490 kWh of electricity, the maximum load was 404 kW.

=== Operating data 1921–23 ===
The electricity supply data for the period 1921–23 was:

Southport power station supply data 1921–23
Electricity Use	Units	Year		
Electricity Use	Units	1921	1922	1923
Lighting and domestic	MWh	1,513	1,672	2,188
Public lighting	MWh	88	82	139
Traction	MWh	828	757	882
Power	MWh	1,439	1,552	1,686
Bulk supply	MWh	0	0	0
Total use	MWh	3,868	4,065	4,875

Electricity Loads on the system were:

Year		1921	1922	1923
Maximum load	kW	2,094	2,550	2,815
Total connections	kW	11,138	12,398	13,985
Load factor	Per cent	25.1	25.7	26.6

Revenue from the sale of current (in 1923) was £73,491; the surplus of revenue over expenses was £46,345.

The electricity supply data for Birkdale in the period 1921–23 was:

Birkdale power station supply data 1921–23
Electricity Use	Units	Year		
Electricity Use	Units	1921	1922	1923
Lighting and domestic	MWh	427	366	404
Public lighting	MWh	23	16	26
Traction	MWh	497	291	0
Power	MWh	40	176	176
Bulk supply	MWh	0	0	0
Total use	MWh	997	850	640

Electricity Loads on the system were:

Year		1921	1922	1923
Maximum load	kW	544	478	522
Total connections	kW	2,349	2,126	2,485
Load factor	Per cent	26.5	26.4	19.8

Revenue from the sale of current (in 1923) was £16,370; the surplus of revenue over expenses was £9,228.

=== Operating data 1946 ===
In 1946 Southport power station supplied 22,877 MWh of electricity; the maximum output load was 11,124 kW. The load factor was 24.7%, and the thermal efficiency was 15.20%.

Birkdale power station was both steam powered and had oil engines, it sent out 242 MWh in 1946 and the maximum load was 1,052 MW.

=== Operating data 1954–67 ===
Operating data for the period 1954–67 was:

Southport power station operating data, 1954–67
Year	Running hours or load factor (per cent)	Max output capacity MW	Electricity supplied MWh	Thermal efficiency per cent
1954	2218	11	13,369	14.57
1955	2019	16	14,122	15.29
1956	1548	16	10,544	15.28
1957	1208	16	6,463	14.19
1958	1914	16	12,139	14.83
1961	0.4 %	16	629	6.51
1962	1.8 %	16	2605	11.94
1963	5.5 %	16	7706	12.98
1967	7.9 %	15	10430	12.54

Total output, in MWh, from Southport and Birkdale power stations

== Southport Electricity District ==
Following nationalisation in 1948 Southport power station became part of the Southport electricity supply district, covering 26 square miles (67.3 km^{2}) with a population of 92,000 in 1958. The number of consumers and electricity sold in the Southport district was:

Year	1957	1958
Number of consumers	31,395	31,877
Electricity sold MWh	93,905	99,823

In 1958 the number of units sold to categories of consumers was:

Type of consumer	No. of consumers	Electricity sold MWh
Domestic	27,703	59,050
Shops and Offices	3,548	24,785
Factories	480	14,248
Farms	144	367
Traction	0	0
Public lighting	2	1,373
Total	31,877	99,823

The maximum demand on the system was 35,900 kW, the load factor was 31.7%.

== See also ==
- Timeline of the UK electricity supply industry
- List of power stations in England
