= Burnley power station =

Power station in Lancashire

- Country: England
- Location: Burnley Lancashire
- Coordinates: 53°47′12″N 02°14′21″W
- Status: Decommissioned and demolished
- Construction began: 1890
- Commission date: 1893
- Decommission date: 1958
- Owners: Burnley Corporation (1890–1948); British Electricity Authority (1948–1955); Central Electricity Authority (1955–1957); Central Electricity Generating Board (1958)
- Operator: As owner

Thermal power station
- Primary fuel: Coal

Power generation
- Nameplate capacity: 8 MW (1923), 5 MW (1958)
- Annual net output: 7,810 MWh (1923), 1,585 MWh (1946)

Burnley power station supplied electricity to the town of Burnley, Lancashire from 1893 to 1958. The electricity station was owned and operated by Burnley Corporation prior to the nationalisation of the British electricity industry in 1948. It was redeveloped as demand for electricity grew and old plant was replaced, and had an ultimate generating capacity of 8 MW in the 1920s. The station closed in 1958.

== History ==
In 1890 Burnley Corporation applied for a provisional order under the Electric Lighting Acts to generate and supply electricity to the town. The Burnley Electric Lighting Order 1890 was granted by the Board of Trade and was confirmed by Parliament through the Electric Lighting Orders Confirmation (No. 2) Act 1890 (53 & 54 Vict. c. clxxxvii). The corporation built a 200 kW power station in Aqueduct Street, Burnley (53°47′12″N 2°14′21″W) across the River Calder from the town's gas works, adjacent to the Burnley Embankment on the Leeds and Liverpool Canal, It first supplied electricity to the town in September 1893.

The power station supplied electricity for the Burnley Corporation Tramways which operated a tramway service from 1901 to 1935.

In 1911 the Burnley electricity committee planned to expand the station with a 1,200 kW steam turbine with tandem generators, the projected cost was £8,129. By 1923 the generating capacity of the station was 8,000 kW. After Blackburn East opened in 1921, construction was authorised of a 33 kVolt transmission line to Burnley via Accrington, however by 1925 only two miles had been completed between Burnley and Rose Grove.

The Central Electricity Board constructed the National Grid (1927–33) to connect power stations and their electricity supply systems within a region. Larger power stations such as the nearby Padiham A (28 MW, commissioned 1927) and Padiham B (240 MW, commissioned from 1962) could generate electricity more efficiently than small local stations such as Burnley.

Burnley Corporation continued as the owner of the power station and electricity supply system until nationalisation of the British electricity industry in 1948. Under nationalisation the Burnley electricity undertaking was abolished, ownership of the power station was vested in the British Electricity Authority, and subsequently the Central Electricity Authority and the Central Electricity Generating Board (CEGB). At the same time the electricity distribution and sales responsibilities of the Burnley electricity undertaking were transferred to the Merseyside and North Wales Electricity Board (MANWEB).

The power station continued to operate for another decade after nationalisation until it was closed in 1958 and was subsequently demolished. The site has been redeveloped with commercial premises.

== Technical specification ==
The original plant at Burnley power station comprised Horizontal compound condensing engines coupled by ropes to Elwell-Parker dynamos. In 1898 the power station supplied 168 customers with 188,928 kWh of electricity; the maximum load was 456 kW. The revenue from the sale of electric current was £4,459 against a cost of generation of £1,526.

By 1923 the generating plant comprised:

- Coal-fired boilers supplying 116,000 lb/h (14.6 kg/s) of steam to:
- Generators
  - 1 × 250 kW reciprocating engine and direct current generator set
  - 1 × 500 kW reciprocating engine and DC generator set
  - 1 × 750 kW reciprocating engine and DC generator set
  - 1 × 1,500 kW steam turbine and DC generator set
  - 1 × 2,000 turbo-alternator AC
  - 1 × 3,000 turbo-alternator AC

These machines had a total generating capacity of 8,000 kW, of which 3,000 kW was DC and 5,000 kW alternating current.

Electricity supplies available to consumers were:

- 3-phase 50 HZ AC at 6.6 kV
- DC at 440 and 220 volts
- DC traction current 530/565 volts

The final use of electricity over the period 1921–23 was:

Burnley electricity use 1921–23
Electricity Use	Units	Year		
Electricity Use	Units	1921	1922	1923
Lighting and domestic	MWh	1,695	1,771	2,064
Public lighting	MWh	12	13	11
Traction	MWh	4,298	3,625	3,850
Power	MWh	1,589	2,014	1,885
Total use	MWh	7,594	7,424	7,810

The electricity system operating parameters were:

Burnley electricity system 1921–23
Operating	Units	Year		
Operating	Units	1921	1922	1923
Maximum load	kW	3,375	3,418	3,788
Total connections	kW	12,370	13,158	14,054
Load factor	Per cent	30.0	29.8	29.3

Revenue from sales of current was £85,297 (1922) and £87,457 (1923). The surplus of revenue over expenses £16,567 (1922) and £45,341 (1923).

In the year 1946 Burnley power station supplied 1,585 MWh of electricity, the maximum load was 6,479 kW.

== See also ==
- Timeline of the UK electricity supply industry
- List of power stations in England
- Coal Clough Wind Farm - Present-day electricity generation in the Borough of Burnley
