= Lister Drive power station =

Former generating stations in Liverpool, England

- Country: England
- Location: Liverpool
- Coordinates: 53°25′10″N 02°55′53″W
- Status: Decommissioned and Demolished
- Commission date: 1900
- Decommission date: 1980
- Owners: Liverpool Corporation (1900–1948); British Electricity Authority (1948–1955); Central Electricity Authority (1955–1957); Central Electricity Generating Board (1958–1981)
- Operator: Sir Marcus Kemp

Thermal power station
- Primary fuel: Coal, fuel oil
- Turbine technology: Steam turbines, gas turbines
- Chimneys: 4
- Cooling towers: 5 hyperbolic concrete, plus wooden towers
- Cooling source: Cooling towers

Power generation
- Units operational: 2 x 25 MW (1926)
- Make and model: Metropolitan-Vickers
- Nameplate capacity: 70 MW (1923), 50 MW (1926), 110 MW (1965)
- Annual net output: 129 GWh (1946)

Lister Drive power station was a series of generating stations that supplied electricity to the City of Liverpool and the wider area from 1900 until 1980. They were owned and collaboratively operated by Liverpool Corporation and Marcus Kemp Coal Limited until the nationalisation of the British electricity supply industry in 1948. The power station was developed in several phases: designated No. 1, No. 2, and No. 3 stations. A gas turbine station was commissioned in March 1965.

== Equipment specification ==
=== Plant in 1914 ===
In 1914 the plant comprised:

- Steam turbine generating sets:
  - 2 × 3,500 kW AC
  - 2 × 2,000 kW DC
  - 1 × 6,000 kW AC

=== Plant in 1923 ===
In 1923 the plant comprised:

- Boilers, producing 1,000,000 lb/h (126 kg/s) of steam supplying:
- Steam turbine generating sets:
  - 6 × 2,000 kW AC
  - 2 × 3,500 kW AC
  - 2 × 6,000 kW AC
  - 1 × 10,000 kW AC
  - 2 × 12,500 kW AC
  - 2 × 2,000 kW DC

The total output was 66.0 MW AC and 4.0 MW DC.

A range of electricity supplies were available (in 1923) to consumers:

- 3-phase, 50 Hz AC at 230 and 400 Volts.
- DC 230 and 460 V
- DC Traction current 500 V

=== No. 3 power station ===
The No. 3 Station was constructed in 1926–28 and comprised:

- Boilers:
  - 2 × 60,000 lb/h (7.6 kg/s) Yarrow, stoker fired
  - 4 × 60,000 lb/h (7.6 kg/s) Babcock and Wilcox, stoker fired
  - 2 × 125,000 lb/h (15.75 kg/s) Babcock and Wilcox, pulverised fuel fired
- The working pressure of the boilers was 325 psi at 700°F (22.4 bar, 371°C).
- Turbo-alternators:
  - 2 × 25 MW Metropolitan-Vickers turbo-alternator generating at 6.3 kV, each with a 375 kW 480 V DC auxiliary generator.
- Cooling towers:
  - 5 × Henshaw cooling towers each with a capacity of 2.615 million gallons per hour (3.302 m^{3}/sec). These were the first ferro-concrete hyperbolic cooling tower in the UK. The Lister Drive towers were 39.6 m high and 30.5 m in diameter at the base.

Coal was delivered to Lister Drive via sidings from the adjacent Edge Hill and Bootle railway line.

== Other Liverpool power stations ==
Lister Drive was the principal power station serving Liverpool. There were other power stations connected to the system supplying electricity to the City.

In 1923 there were five rubbish destructors burning trade and domestic refuse, the steam raised in the destructor furnaces drove steam turbines. There were 7 × 100 kW, 2 × 150 kW, 5 × 200 kW, and 1 × 500 kW machines generating a DC supply. The total generating capacity was 2.5 MW.

Clarence Dock power station was constructed for Liverpool Corporation in 1931 to be an integral part of the local electricity grid system supplying, in conjunction with Lister Drive, electricity throughout Liverpool.

In 1965 two 56 MW fuel oil fired English Electric gas turbines were installed at Lister Drive. Each machine had two power turbines coupled to alternators. The gas turbines were used to meet peak demand.

== Operations ==
=== Operating data 1921–23 ===
The operating data for the period 1921–23 is shown in the table:

Lister Drive power station operating data 1921–23
| Electricity Use | Units | Year | | | |
| Electricity Use | Units | 1921 | 1922 | 1923 | 1928 |
|---|---|---|---|---|---|
| Lighting and domestic use | MWh | 9,796 | 10,255 | 13,774 | |
| Public lighting use | MWh | 323 | 321 | 600 | |
| Traction | MWh | 29,825 | 26,413 | 31,399 | |
| Power use | MWh | 46,033 | 48,541 | 66,606 | |
| Bulk supply | MWh | 356 | 2,658 | 5,775 | |
| Total electricity use | MWh | 86,333 | 88,188 | 118,155 | 268,000 |
| Load and connected load | | | | | |
| Maximum load | kW | 38,317 | 40,325 | 52,155 | 89,600 |
| Total connections | kW | 79,850 | 85,957 | 94,763 | |
| Load factor | Per cent | 30.6 | 30.0 | 29.4 | |
| Financial | | | | | |
| Revenue from sales of current | £ | – | 968,012 | 1,211,537 | |
| Surplus of revenue over expenses | £ | – | 364,569 | 596,050 | |

There was a significant growth of demand and use of electricity in this period.

Under the terms of the Electricity (Supply) Act 1926 (16 & 17 Geo. 5. c. 51) the Central Electricity Board (CEB) was established in 1926. The CEB identified high efficiency ‘selected’ power stations that would supply electricity most effectively; Lister Drive was designated a selected station. The CEB also constructed the national grid (1927–33) to connect power stations within a region. Lister Drive power station was connected to an electricity grid ring which included Southport, Preston (Ribble), Warrington and Wigan (Westwood); this was one of three electricity rings in the North West. The others were Bolton, Padiham, Rawtenstall and Kearsley power stations ring; and the third was Manchester, Oldham, Tame Valley and Stockport ring.

=== Operating data 1946 ===
Lister Drive power station operating data for 1946 is shown in the table.

Lister Drive power station operating data, 1946
| Lister Drive | Load factor per cent | Max output load MW | Electricity supplied GWh | Thermal efficiency per cent |
|---|---|---|---|---|
| No. 1 | – | 22.370 | 9.572 | – |
| No. 2 | 28.7 | 48.170 | 119.764 | 15.65 |

The British electricity supply industry was nationalised in 1948 under the provisions of the Electricity Act 1947 (10 & 11 Geo. 6. c. 54). The Liverpool Corporation electricity undertaking was abolished, ownership of Lister Drive power station was vested in the British Electricity Authority, and subsequently the Central Electricity Authority and the Central Electricity Generating Board (CEGB). At the same time the electricity distribution and sales responsibilities of the Liverpool Corporation electricity undertaking were transferred to the Merseyside and North Wales Electricity Board (MANWEB).

=== Operating data 1954–79 ===
Operating data for the period 1954–79 is shown in the table:

Lister Drive power station operating data, 1954–79
| Year | Running hours or load factor (per cent) | Max output capacity MW | Electricity supplied GWh | Thermal efficiency per cent |
|---|---|---|---|---|
| 1954 | 2906 | 48 | 54.093 | 13.05 |
| 1955 | 2472 | 48 | 54.466 | 14.28 |
| 1956 | 1900 | 48 | 28.552 | 12.76 |
| 1957 | 1738 | 48 | 23.430 | 13.01 |
| 1958 | 2470 | 48 | 32.386 | 12.77 |
| 1961 | 0.8 % | 48 | 3.435 | 7.57 |
| 1962 | 1.7 % | 48 | 7.133 | 8.31 |
| 1963 | 4.82% | 48 | 20.252 | 10.28 |
| 1967 | (4.2 %) | 49 | 18.223 | 12.87 |
Gas turbine station
| 1967 | (6.3 %) | 2 × 56 | 60.998 | 23.13 |
| 1972 | 9.8 % | 2 × 56 | 94.437 | 24.13 |
| 1979 | 1.8 % | 110 | 17.600 | 23.7 |

The plant was used less intensive over the period 1954–62 as its thermal efficiency decreased and Liverpool used electricity from the national grid.

== Closure ==
Lister Drive power station was decommissioned in about 1981. The buildings were subsequently demolished and the area has been redeveloped. The gas turbine station was closed down in 1993. The cooling towers were demolished on 8 May 1994. A 275 kV substation is still operational east of the former power station site.

== See also ==
- Timeline of the UK electricity supply industry
- List of power stations in England
- Bromborough power station
- Percival Lane power station
- Manweb Remembered
