= Ribble Power Station =

Former coal-fired power station in Lancashire, England

- Country: United Kingdom
- Location: Penwortham, Lancashire
- Coordinates: 53°45′26″N 02°43′41″W
- Status: Decommissioned and demolished
- Construction began: 1923
- Commission date: December 1924
- Decommission date: October 1976
- Construction cost: £570,000
- Owners: Preston Corporation (1923–1948); British Electricity Authority (1948–1955); Central Electricity Authority (1955–1957); Central Electricity Generating Board (1958–1976)
- Operator: As owner

Thermal power station
- Primary fuel: Coal
- Turbine technology: Steam turbines
- Chimneys: 'A' originally 8, later 2; 'B' 2
- Cooling towers: None
- Cooling source: Estuary water

Power generation
- Units operational: 'A' 3 × 14 MW + 1 × 12.5 MW, 'B' 4 × 31.5 MW
- Make and model: English Electric
- Units decommissioned: All
- Nameplate capacity: 186 MW
- Annual net output: 426.27 GWh (1945), 121.52 GWh (1971)

Ribble Power Station was a coal-fired electricity generating station on the River Ribble in Penwortham near Preston, Lancashire, England. The station was built by the Corporation of Preston to replace a small privately-run generating station in the town. It supplied electricity to Preston and the surrounding area from 1923 until 1976. The station was expanded with new equipment in 1943–47 (known as the No.2 or 'B' station) which remained in operation until the power station was closed in 1976 and was subsequently demolished.

== History ==
Electric Lighting Orders Confirmation (No. 13) Act 1890
- Act of Parliament
- Parliament of the United Kingdom
- Long title: An Act to confirm certain Provisional Orders made by the Board of Trade under the Electric Lighting Acts, 1882 and 1888, relating to Preston, and Preston and Fulwood.
- Citation: 53 & 54 Vict. c. cxcv

Dates
- Royal assent: 4 August 1890

Text of statute as originally enacted

The National Electric Supply Company Limited obtained legal powers under the Preston Electric Lighting Order and the Preston and Fulwood Electric Lighting Order, both confirmed by the Electric Lighting Orders Confirmation (No. 13) Act 1890 (53 & 54 Vict. c. cxcv), to generate and supply electricity throughout Preston. Electricity was first supplied in 1891 by the National Electric Supply Company Limited. The service began from a small plant in Corporation Street in August 1892. A larger facility was subsequently built in Crown Street. The station supplied the central areas of Preston including Fishergate, Friargate, and Church Street. The system was later expanded to Fulwood, Barton and Lea.

In 1897 the plant had a generating capacity of 602 kW and the maximum load was 155 kW. A total of 332.305 MWh of electricity was sold to 450 customers which powered 23,300 lamps plus 38.996 MWh for public lamps, this provided an income to the company of £8,913-6-9.

=== Crown Street plant ===
By 1921 the plant comprised a 1,000 kW steam turbine-driven alternator providing a 440 Volt, 50 Hz, 3-phase AC electricity supply. There was also two 510 kW and a 200 kW reciprocating engines, together with 750 kW and 1,000 kW steam turbine generators (totalling 2,970 kW) providing a 440/220 Volt DC supply. The turbines and engines were supplied with a total of 94,000 pounds per hour (11.84 kg/s) of steam from coal-fired boilers. In 1921 the maximum load on the system was 2,700 kW and there was a connected load of 9,129 kW. In that year the plant generated a total of 4.490 GWh of electricity and sold 4.184 GWh realising a revenue of £67,222. The surplus of revenue in excess of running expenses was £19,711.

The reversion clauses of the Electric Lighting Act 1882 and the Electric Lighting Act 1888 permitted local authorities to purchase company electricity undertakings. The Corporation of Preston acquired the National Electric Supply Company Limited in 1922. The corporation recognised that the existing electricity plant was inadequate to meet the growing demand for electricity from residential and industrial consumers. Plans were developed to acquire land at Penwortham south-west of Preston for the construction of a new, larger facility which was to become the Ribble Power Station.

== Ribble power station ==
The site at Penwortham, south of the River Ribble, was selected because it was opposite Preston Docks enabling the supply of coal, and was on a tidal river (with a tidal range of 22 ft or 6.7 m) which provided cooling water for condensing steam in the power station. Construction began in 1923 and was largely completed by December 1924. From the outset the station was planned to have an initial generating capacity from two 12.5 MW turbo-alternators, with space available for two further sets; these were installed in 1928 and 1930. The station was intended to supply electricity not just to Preston but to the wider area of mid-Lancashire. This included the Fylde and towns in East Lancashire; Blackburn in the centre of the area; Colne and Nelson in the north-east; and Leyland, Walton-le-Dale and Chorley in the south. An underground transmission line was constructed between Preston and Blackburn operating at 33 kV and had an electrical capacity of 10 MW.

Ribble power station was officially opened on the 22nd of July 1925 by Sir John Snell, Chairman of the Electricity Commissioners. Sir John said that the station was "a model of what a modern generating plant should be." The layout of the station was arranged such that the 6.6 kV and 33 kV switchgear was at the north of the site closest to the river, immediately to the south was the control room, then the turbine house with the four 15 MW English Electric Company turbo-alternators (generating at 6.6 kV, 3-phase, 50 Hz), which were positioned transversely. The boiler house was south of the turbine house and housed eight Babcock & Wilcox water tube boilers. Each boiler initially had its own chimney but the flues were reconfigured in the late 1930s to combine them into two taller chimneys to the south of the site. The taller chimneys increased the dilution and dispersion of smoke and fumes. Further to the south was the 33 kV sub-station. To the west of the power station was an extensive coal store, later the site of the 'B' station. An overhead conveyer across the river transported coal to the station from a coal stack in the docks. This was replenished from local coal mines and delivered via the Preston Docks branch railway. The power station was built at a cost of £19 per kW (£570,000), the third and fourth generators reduced the cost to £15 and £13 per kW respectively.

In 1927 the Central Electricity Board (CEB) assumed responsibility across the country for directing the operation of 'selected' power stations and paying for their operation. Ribble power station became a selected station. Preston Corporation had the right to buy the electricity they required from the Board. The CEB built the first stages of the National Grid between 1927–33. Ribble power station was connected to an electricity grid ring which included the power stations at Southport, Lister Drive (Liverpool), Warrington and Westwood (Wigan); this was one of three electricity rings in the North West. The others were Bolton, Padiham, Rawtenstall and Kearsley power stations ring; and the third was Manchester, Oldham, Tame Valley and Stockport ring.

=== Station capacity and output ===
The growth in the generating capacity at Ribble power station is shown in the table.

Ribble power station generating capacity, MW
Year(s)	1923–4	1925–7	1928	1929	1930–1	1932–42	1943	1944–7	1954	1957	1961–3
Generating capacity, MW	6.17	25.6	38.1	53.1	58.1	60.6	92.1	123.6	120	154	55 & 126

Electricity generating output of Ribble power station, in GWh, from 1923 to 1947

The graph illustrates several points. The plateau in the generation of electricity from 1936 is a period when the Central Electricity Board directed the operation of Ribble power station. Preston Corporation was able to purchase electricity to meet its demand. In 1932 the Corporation purchased 1.32 GWh of electricity, by 1943 it purchased 274.2 GWh. The step change in electricity generation in 1944 and 1945 illustrates the commissioning of the first two 31.5 MW turbo-alternators in the 'B' station. The drop in electricity generation in 1946 and 1947 illustrates the effects of the fuel crisis in 1946–7 when the availability of coal was severely restricted. During the fuel crisis the output from Ribble power station had reduced from its normal daily load of 100 MW to 40 MW realising a saving of 750 tons of coal.

Electricity generating output of Ribble power station, in GWh, from 1954 to 1972

== Ribble No.2 or 'B' power station ==
A major expansion of the Ribble power station was planned from 1939, however, the war delayed final completion. The new, but associated, station was known as Ribble Generating Station No.2 (R.G.S. No.2) or Ribble 'B'. The new station was built immediately to the west of the No.1 station, on the site of the No.1 station coal store. It comprised, from north to south, transformer bays, then a Auxiliary switchgear room. To the south was the turbine house comprising four 31.5 MW turbo-alternators arranged longitudinally. Next was the boiler house with eight boilers. The boilers had a combined output of 1.40 million pounds per hour (176.4 kg/s) of steam. The steam conditions were 600 psi (41.3 bar) and 454 °C. The boiler flues were gathered into two chimneys south of the building. There were eventually four 31.5 MW English Electric turbo-alternators generating at 11 kV. To the west of the station building was a reserve coal store; then further west the Central Electricity Board sub-station which provided the link to the National Grid and to the south a 33 kV sub-station. In addition to water cooling directly from the river there were two underground tunnels for circulating water to and from the dock for use at low tide. The circulation rate was 6 million gallons per hour (5.05 m^{3}/s).

The first two new alternators were commissioned in 1943 and 1944. The increase in station output is evident in the above graph.

== Nationalisation ==
Upon nationalisation of the British electricity supply industry in 1948 the ownership of Ribble power station was vested in the British Electricity Authority, and subsequently the Central Electricity Authority and the Central Electricity Generating Board (CEGB). At the same time the electricity distribution and sales responsibilities of the Preston electricity undertaking were transferred to the North Western Electricity Board (NORWEB).

With the construction of the 400 kV super grid in the 1960s a major high-voltage sub-station was built in Penwortham. This was connected to the high-voltage sub-stations at Carrington, Heysham, Hutton, Kearsley, and Kirkby. An offtake from the Penwortham 400 kV sub-station is connected to the 132 kV sub-station on the site of Ribble power station for onward transmission into Preston.

In 1958 the Preston electricity district supplied an area of 169 square miles and a population of 180,850. The amount of electricity sold and the number and types of consumers was as follows:

Year	Electricity sold, MWh	No. of consumers
1956	252,607	57,698
1957	271,959	58,628
1958	288,354	59,441

In 1958 the above totals were made up of the following:

Type of Consumer	No. of consumers	Electricity sold, MWh
Domestic	50,599	95,823
Commercial	4,297	40,051
Combined premises	2,071	9,907
Farms	1,851	18,259
Industrial	614	120,689
Public lighting	9	3,625
Total	59,441	288,354

The total generating capacity of the Ribble power station in the 1950s was 186 MW. The plant of the 'A' station was decommissioned in the 1960s, although the No.2 or 'B' station continued to supply electricity to the national grid. By 1971 the plant at Ribble power station comprised four 31.5 MW turbo-alternators, the maximum output capacity was 126 MW. In the year ending 31 March 1972 the electricity supplied from the station was 121.521 GWh.

Ribble power station was closed by the CEGB and ceased to generate electricity on 25 October 1976. The station was subsequently demolished, and the area was redeveloped as a park.

== See also ==
- Timeline of the UK electricity supply industry
- List of power stations in England
- List of pre-nationalisation UK electric power companies
- National Grid (UK)
