= Simonstone railway station =

Railway station in Lancashire, England

Simonstone

General information
- Location: Simonstone, Ribble Valley, Lancashire; England
- Coordinates: 53.7984°N 2.3430°W
- Platforms: 2

Other information
- Status: Disused

History
- Original company: Lancashire and Yorkshire Railway
- Pre-grouping: London and North Western Railway
- Post-grouping: London, Midland and Scottish Railway

Key dates
- 15 October 1877: Opened
- 2 December 1957: Closed
Location

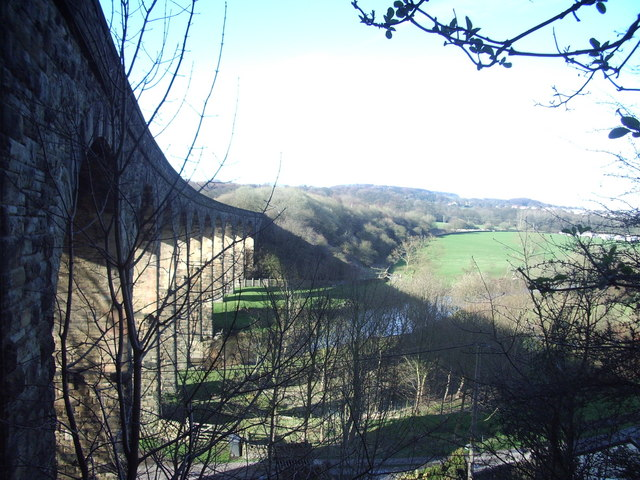
The Martholme Viaduct over the River Calder between Great Harwood and Simonstone looking in the direction of Simonstone

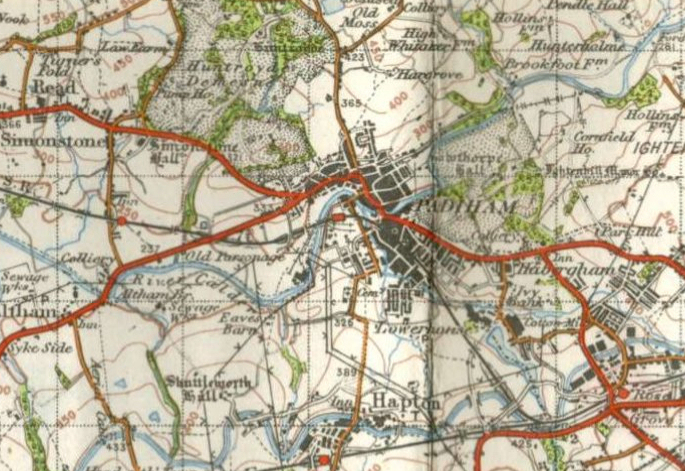
1948 Ordnance Survey map showing location of Simonstone station and local rail connections with Padiham railway station, Rose Grove railway station and Hapton railway station, the latter two on the main line and both still open

Simonstone railway station was located on the east side of Simonstone Lane, 0.75 miles (1 km) south of Simonstone centre and near Padiham, Lancashire, England. It was on a branch line (usually known as the Great Harwood loop) of the East Lancashire Line, from Burnley to Blackburn.

== History ==
The line between Padiham and Rose Grove opened in 1875. West of Padiham it opened two years later as a result of difficulties in constructing the embankments between Great Harwood and Simonstone in the vicinity of Martholme Viaduct over the River Calder.

It was closed on 2 December 1957 and the station later demolished. The railway line from Burnley to Simonstone was partly retained as far as Blackburn Road, just west of Padiham, for continuing deliveries of coal to Padiham Power Station until the power station closed in 1993. The nearest station is now at Hapton, about 2 miles (3 km) south of Padiham.

Part of the old station site has been converted to an industrial estate.

The Martholme Viaduct on the line between Simonstone and Great Harwood remains and is about 2.5 miles (4 km) west.

== Greenway ==
Lancashire County Council began work in 2005 to convert part of the line to a footpath/bridleway/cycle path to be called Padiham Greenway. The route stretches from Mollywood Lane, Rose Grove to Padiham Memorial Park and is about 1.5 miles (2 km) long. The Greenway was officially opened on 24 June 2010. It links to the River Calder Greenway and the towpath of the Leeds and Liverpool Canal to form a circular route and also has a branch to Gawthorpe Hall a National Trust property in Padiham. The route also links to the East Lancashire line at Hapton, Rose Grove and Burnley Barracks.
In 2017 the Martholme Greenway group reopened the section from Simonstone lane to Gooseleach wood as a public footpath. This required the manufacture and installation of two new bridges to replace ones removed when the line closed and the creation of access steps off Simonstone lane.

| Preceding station | Disused railways | Following station |
|---|---|---|
| Great Harwood; Line and station closed | Lancashire and Yorkshire Railway; Great Harwood Loop | Padiham; Line and station closed |
