= Wigan Flashes =

Wetland in Greater Manchester, England

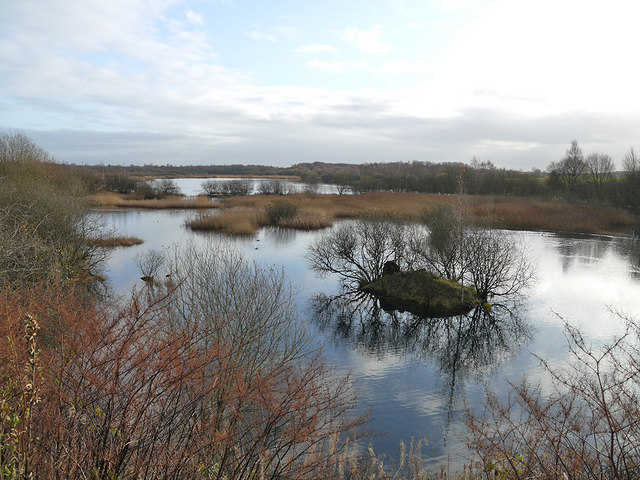
- Interactive map of Wigan Flashes
- Location: Wigan, Greater Manchester, England
- Coordinates: 53°31′33″N 2°37′48″W
- Area: 1,824.2 acres (738.21 ha)
- Designation: National Nature Reserve
- Designated: 2022
- Governing body: Natural England, Lancashire Wildlife Trust

Wigan Flashes are an area of open water, lakes, and wetlands created due to mining subsidence in Wigan and Leigh, Greater Manchester, England. The subsidence occurred around 1902, and the name "flashes" derives from the resulting flash flooding that formed the lakes. The site is a designated National Nature Reserve and covers 1,824 acres (738 ha). The area is managed by the Lancashire Wildlife Trust and Natural England.

The Flashes consist of a series of interconnected lakes and wetlands, forming a valuable wildlife habitat. The site includes eight bodies of water, including Scotsman's Flash, Pearson's Flash, and Westwood Flash. It also features 6 miles (10 km) of footpaths and trails, with a spur of the Leeds and Liverpool Canal running through the area.

The Flashes serve as part of an important natural corridor, linking several local nature reserves and green spaces in the region. The terrain includes marshland, reed beds, woodland, and grassland, creating a diverse ecological landscape.

== Ecology ==
Wigan Flashes provide a habitat for a range of flora and fauna. The Flashes support around 2% of England's population of willow tits, with approximately 50 breeding pairs. Other key species include waterfowl such as the bittern, which has been recorded using the wetlands as a feeding and breeding ground. The diverse habitat supports a variety of dragonflies, amphibians, and invertebrates. The site is also home to several plant species, including rare orchids and evening primrose, particularly in areas that were previously filled with ash from the Westwood Power Station.

== History ==
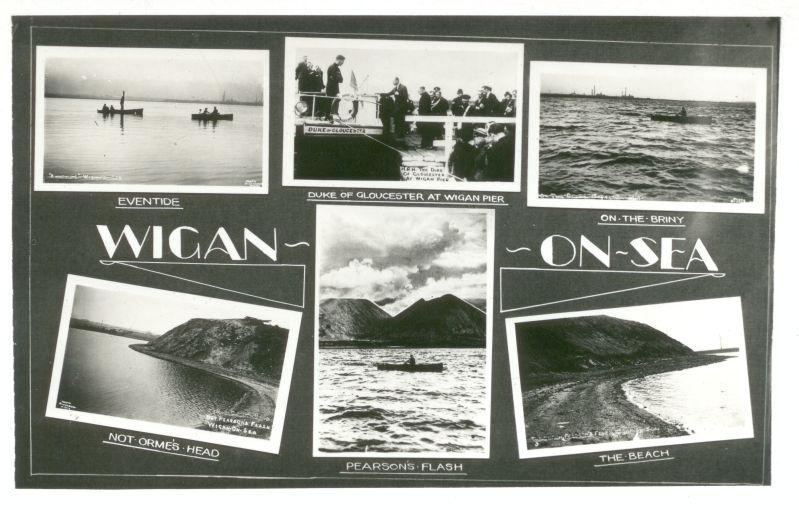
Satirical 1920s postcard for "Wigan-On-Sea" featuring the Flashes and Wigan Pier

Before the impact of coal mining in the late 19th and early 20th centuries, the land around the Wigan Flashes was primarily agricultural, with patches of mossland. Subsidence caused by mining operations led to the formation of large depressions in the land, which subsequently filled with water. Over time, these water bodies evolved into significant wetland habitats. During the mid-20th century, parts of the site were used as industrial waste disposal areas, including the deposition of ash from the now-demolished Westwood Power Station. Despite this, natural regeneration has allowed the site to develop into an ecologically valuable area, recognised for its biodiversity and conservation importance.

In 2022, Wigan Flashes were officially designated as part of one of the largest National Nature Reserves in England. This designation aims to protect and enhance the site's ecological value while allowing public access for recreation and education.

== See also ==
- Pennington Flash Country Park
