= Great Harwood railway station =

Railway station in Lancashire, England

Great Harwood

General information
- Location: Great Harwood, Hyndburn; England
- Coordinates: 53.7852°N 2.3968°W
- Platforms: 2

Other information
- Status: Disused

History
- Original company: Lancashire and Yorkshire Railway
- Pre-grouping: Lancashire and Yorkshire Railway
- Post-grouping: London, Midland and Scottish Railway

Key dates
- 5 October 1877: Opened
- 2 December 1957: Closed for regular passenger trains
- 2 November 1964: closed completely
Location

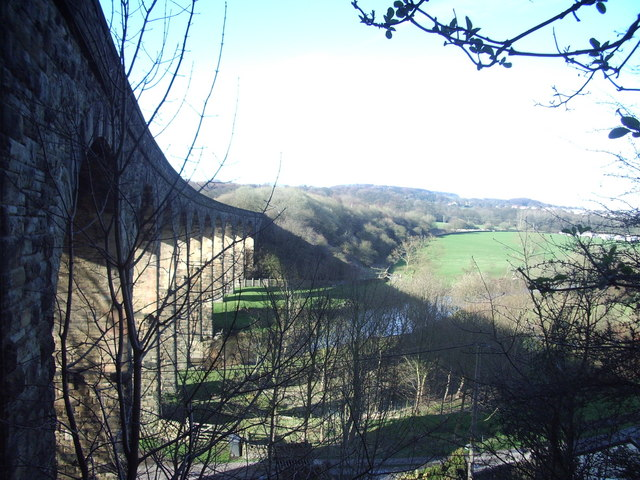
The Martholme Viaduct over the River Calder between Great Harwood and Simonstone looking in the direction of Simonstone

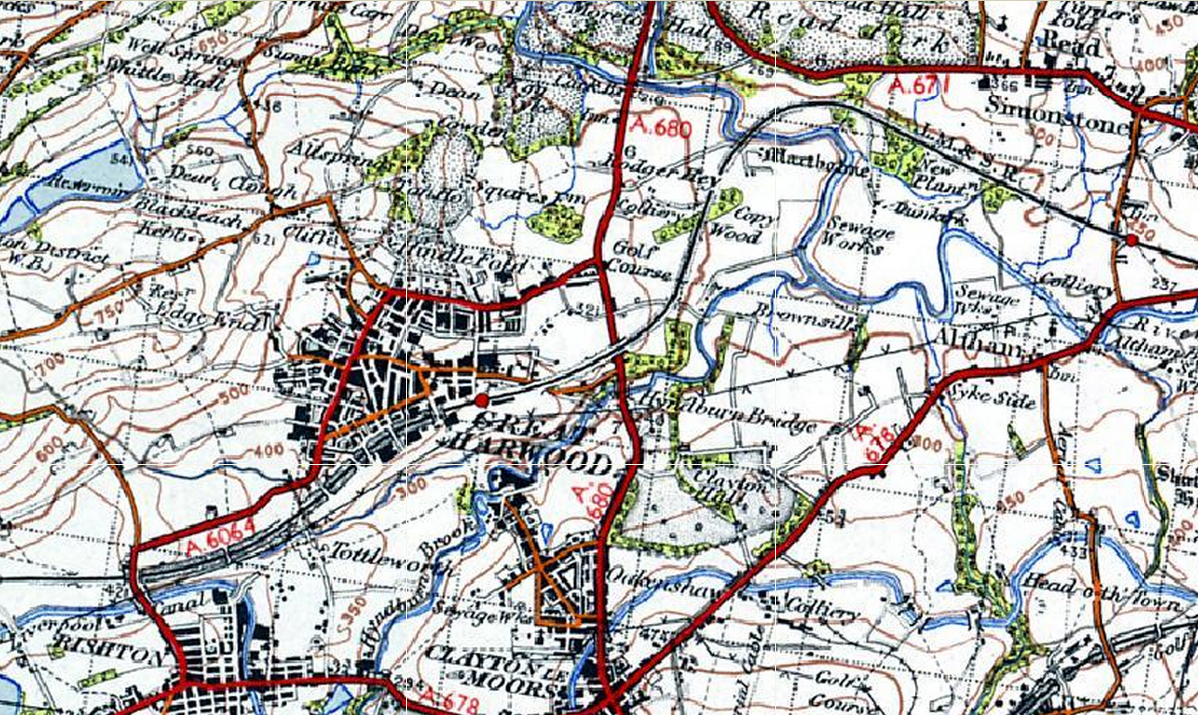
1948 Ordnance Survey map showing the route of the line between Great Harwood and Simonstone stations with the Martholme Viaduct and embankments roughly equidistant

Great Harwood railway station was located in the south east side of Great Harwood, Lancashire, England on Station Road, which still remains. The station was on a branch line, usually known as the Great Harwood loop, of the East Lancashire Line from Burnley to Blackburn via Rose Grove, Padiham, Simonstone and Great Harwood.

== History ==
The line between Padiham and Rose Grove opened in 1875. West of Padiham, it opened two years later, as a result of difficulties in constructing the embankments between Great Harwood and Simonstone in the vicinity of Martholme Viaduct.

It was closed to regular passenger trains on 2 December 1957 but special trains operated until complete closure in 1964. Subsequently the station was later demolished and the site converted to an industrial estate. The line through the town and further west has been converted to a cycle way and footpath linking with the Leeds and Liverpool Canal west of the town.

The Martholme Viaduct over the River Calder, on the east section of the line between Simonstone and Great Harwood, remains, and is outside the town about 1 mile (2 km) north east.

Preceding station	Disused railways	Following station
Blackburn; Station open	Lancashire and Yorkshire Railway; Great Harwood Loop	Simonstone; Line and station closed
