= Horace Field Parshall =

American-born British electrical engineer

Dr. Horace Field Parshall
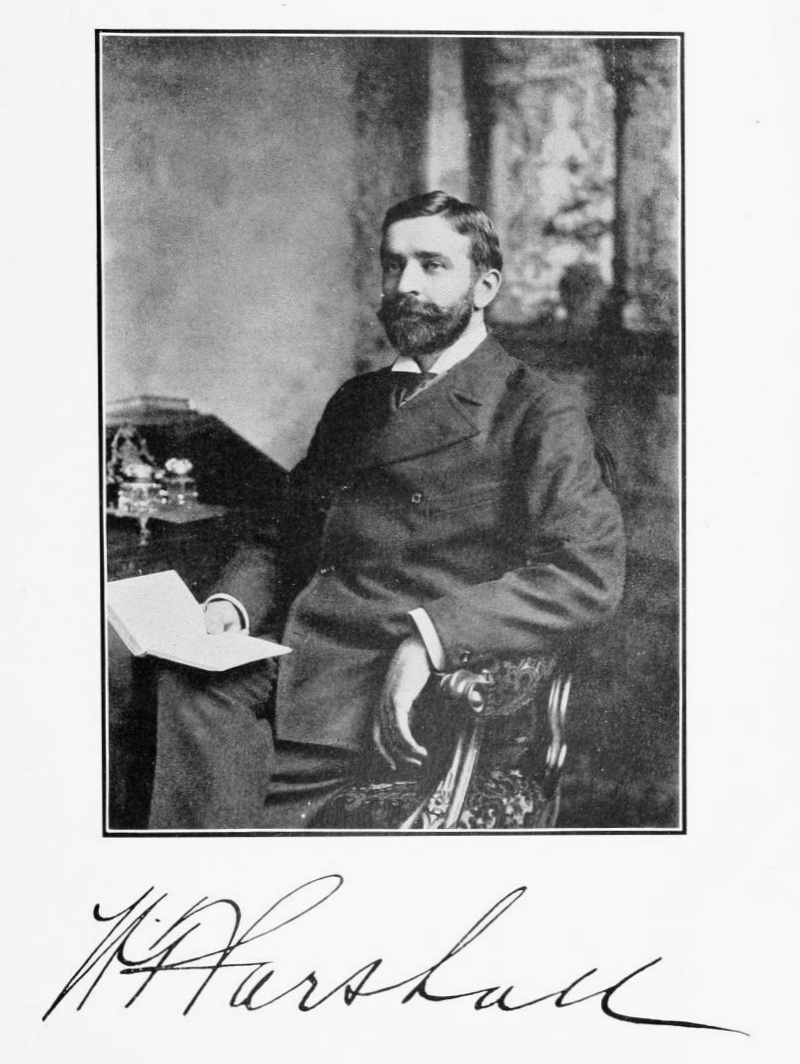
- Parshall in a 1903 publication
- Born: 9 September 1865; Milford, New York, United States
- Died: 12 December 1932 (aged 67)
- Occupation: Electrical Engineer

Horace Field Parshall (9 September 1865 – 12 December 1932) was an electrical engineer specialising in rotating electrical machines, railway traction, and electrical distribution. Born in America, he worked for General Electric, later moving to the United Kingdom, where he was involved in the installation of a number of electrical schemes, including the Central London Railway and the Lancashire Electric Power Company, becoming a director of both.

In Britain, he was financially successful and used his wealth to construct a mansion, Penbury Grove, near Beaconsfield, Buckinghamshire. After the death of his first wife, he became involved in a bigamy case due to an attempt by a married couple to obtain his wealth through a fraudulent marriage.

He authored a number of works on electrical engineering, and a book on the genealogy of his branch of the Parshall family including a short autobiography.

== Biography ==
Horace Field Parshall was born on 9 September 1865, at Milford, New York, the son of James Everett Parshall (1839–99), a lawyer, and Phoebe Anne née Field (d. 1899). He was educated at Hartwick Seminary, then studied electrical engineering at Cornell University, leaving after two years to study at Lehigh University. He joined the Sprague Electric Railway & Motor Company, and by 25 was a chief design engineer of the Edison General Electric Company, remaining with the company after it amalgamated into the General Electric company.

In 1893, he married Annie Matilda (Blanch) Rogers. (Note: Referred to as Annie Matilda Rogers in the 'Who's Who' biography of Horace Field (jnr. 1903-86); in the Otsego Farmer notice of 1893 his wife is referred to as Blanche Rogers. In the newspaper articles "Sounds More Like Fiction, This Real Life Story" his wife is referred to have been a 'Miss Rutty'. In the 'Who's Who' biography of Horace Field (snr. 1865-1919) he is noted as marrying Mary Blackwell of New York in 1919, the earlier marriage is not noted.)

Lectures given at Massachusetts Institute of Technology formed the basis of the books Armature windings of electric machines, and Electric generators (later expanded as Electric machine design) published between 1895 and 1906.

He was involved in installing electrical equipment on the Dublin tramways, Glasgow tramways, Bristol tramways and elsewhere, and installed the electrical system of the Central London Railway; a pioneering example of a three phase transmission system using rotary converters. He was also chairman of the Central London Railway, and also involved in the design of the system used by the Lancashire Electric Power Company, of which he was also chairman.

In 1912, he became involved in a widely publicised bigamy case - having been tricked into marrying a Mrs. Deborah Jeffreys in 1911, who had been forced under threat of death by her husband to pose as a widow and seduce and marry the widowed Parshall in an attempt to gain access to his wealth. His marriage to Mrs. Jeffreys was annulled, and after a trial Mrs. Jeffreys was given a nominal single day in prison due to having been led into the situation by her estranged husband, and having confessed her situation to Mr. Parshall. (Note: The story "Sounds More Like Fiction, This Real Life Story" was widely syndicated, appearing in the 'Fort Covington Sun', 'Port Ville Review', Turtle Mountain Star and other US newspapers.)

In 1902, he constructed a mansion, Penbury Grove, near Beaconsfield, Buckinghamshire; a replica of Pennsbury Manor, the residence of William Penn of Pennsylvania. (Note: The house included a fine rock garden, and was one of the first in the area to have electricity. It was acquired by the Inner London Education Authority and used as a school (c.1960) until 1986.)

In 1915, he published a genealogy of his branch of the Parshall family, having earlier sponsored the production of a broader genealogical history by J.C. Parshall.

He died on 12 December 1932. He had two children: Horace Field (1903-1986) and Kathleen; both born in England.

== Works ==
=== Books ===
- Parshall, H.F.; Hobart, H.M. (1895), Armature windings of electric machines
- Parshall, H.F.; Hobart, H.M. (1900), Electric generators
- Parshall, H.F.; Hobart, H.M. (1906), Electric machine design
- Parshall, H.F.; Hobart, H.M. (1907), "Electric railway engineering", Nature, 75 (1953): 531, Bibcode:1907Natur..75..531., doi:10.1038/075531a0, S2CID 10629498
- Parshall, H.F. (1915), The Parshall family, A.D. 870-1913 : a collection of historical records and notes to accompany the Parshall pedigree

=== Journals ===
- Parshall, H. F. (1890). "Magnetic Data of the Sprague Street Car Motor". Transactions of the American Institute of Electrical Engineers. 7 (1): 218–225. doi:10.1109/T-AIEE.1890.5570262. S2CID 51647295.
- Parshall, H. F. (1892). "Methods of Electrically Controlling Street Car Motors". Transactions of the American Institute of Electrical Engineers. 9 (1): 135–166. doi:10.1109/T-AIEE.1892.5570441. S2CID 51675724.
- Parshall, H. F. (1896). "Magnetic Data of Iron and Steel". Minutes of the Proceedings. 126. Institution of Civil Engineers: 220. doi:10.1680/imotp.1896.19489.
- Parshall, H. F. (1897). "Alternating-Current Dynamo Tests. (Including Appendix and Plate at Back of Volume)". Minutes of the Proceedings. 130 (1897). Institution of Civil Engineers: 247–262. doi:10.1680/imotp.1897.19269.
- Parshall, H.F. (June 1898), "Earth returns for electric tramways", Journal of the Institution of Electrical Engineers, 27 (135): 440–456, doi:10.1049/jiee-1.1898.0015
- Parshall, M. F. (1898). "Dublin Electric Tramway. (Including Plate at Back of Volume)". Minutes of the Proceedings. 133 (1898). Institution of Civil Engineers: 174–192. doi:10.1680/imotp.1898.19135.
- Parshall, H. F. (1899). "Economical Transmission and Distribution of Electricity from a Distance. (Abstract). Second Metropolitan Engineering Conference, 8 June 1899. Notes Introducing Subjects for Discussion. Section Vii - Applications of Electricity". Minutes of the Proceedings. 138 (1899). Institution of Civil Engineers: 486–487. doi:10.1680/imotp.1899.18958.
- Parshall, H. F. (1915). "Economics of Electric Railway Distribution (Including Appendixes and Plates at Back of Volume)". Minutes of the Proceedings. 199 (1915). Institution of Civil Engineers: 47–97. doi:10.1680/imotp.1915.16176.
- Parshall, H. F. (1922). "Hydro-Electric Installations of the Barcelona Traction, Light and Power Company". Minutes of the Proceedings. 213 (1922). Institution of Civil Engineers: 295–318. doi:10.1680/imotp.1922.14552.

== Notes and references ==
=== Sources ===
- "Parshall, Horace Field", Who Was Who (online edition), A & C Black/Oxford University Press (subscription required)
