= Huncoat Power Station =

Former electricity generating station

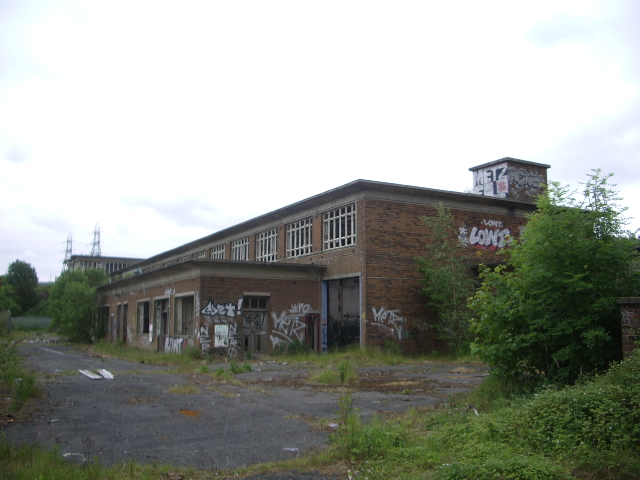
- The derelict administration block in 2008
- Country: United Kingdom
- Location: Huncoat Lancashire
- Coordinates: 53°46′34″N 02°20′15″W
- Status: Decommissioned and demolished
- Construction began: 1948
- Commission date: 1952–57
- Decommission date: 1984
- Construction cost: £5 million (1946)
- Owners: British Electricity Authority (1948–1955); Central Electricity Authority (1955–1957); Central Electricity Generating Board (1958–1988)
- Operators: British Electricity Authority (1948–1955); Central Electricity Authority (1955–1957); Central Electricity Generating Board (1958–1988)

Thermal power station
- Primary fuel: Coal
- Turbine technology: Steam turbines
- Chimneys: 2
- Cooling towers: 2
- Cooling source: Circulating water, cooling towers

Power generation
- Units operational: 5 × 32 MW
- Make and model: Fraser & Chalmers–G.E.C.
- Units decommissioned: All units
- Nameplate capacity: 150 MW
- Annual net output: 667 MW (1957), see graph

External links
- Commons: Related media on Commons

Huncoat Power Station was located in Huncoat near Accrington, Lancashire. It was a 150 MW, coal-fired, electricity generating station in operation from 1952 to 1984. It has since been demolished. Huncoat power station replaced the earlier Accrington power station that had supplied electricity to the town since 1900.

== History ==
Huncoat Power Station was planned by Accrington Corporation in 1946. The Accrington Corporation Electricity Committee appointed Mr H. Clarke to advise the corporation on the design, construction and commissioning of the £5 million new station for a fee of £125,000. He was to pay the Borough Electrical Engineer £15,000, and £11,000 to other officers and members of staff and £9,000 to special staff appointed by the corporation. These arrangements were approved by the Central Electricity Board.

Plans were drawn up and the development was authorised by the Minister of Fuel and Power, Hugh Gaitskell, in late 1947 following a public inquiry held in August 1947. The station was located to utilise coal from the neighbouring Huncoat Colliery and the wider Burnley Coalfield. The station was 2.5 miles north-east of Accrington. The power station was designed by the architect Robert Norman MacKellar (1890–1973). The first sod for the power station was dug by the Mayor of Accrington on 31 January 1948. Following nationalisation of the electricity industry from 1 April 1948 ownership of the power station was vested in the British Electricity Authority (BEA) which continued construction of the power station, and which first became operational in 1952. Following reorganisations in the British electricity industry ownership of the power station devolved on 1 April 1955 to the Central Electricity Authority (CEA), then to the Central Electricity Generating Board (GEGB) from 1 January 1958.

=== Station layout ===
The main buildings of the power station were constructed on a south-west to north-east axis. The boiler house and the two chimneys were to the north-west and successively to the south-east were the turbine house, the control room, switch house, and grid switchgear. An administrative block was to the south-west of the main buildings. The two cooling towers were east of the main building and the coal store, including a screening and crushing house, was to the north-east of the site. There was also a water treatment plant, a water settling tank and an ash sump.

The power station initially received coal from the nearby Huncoat Colliery via a half-mile railway line and sidings. These were on the north side of the railway line and transported coal to the station by an overhead conveyor enclosed in a concrete duct. The colliery was closed in 1968 as uneconomic, after which the power station received coal by railway from the wider area.

=== Specification ===
The principal plant at the power station comprised:

- Five Simon-Carves 305,000 lb/hr (38.4 kg/s) of steam, pulverised fuel boilers, operating at 625 psi at 860 °F (43.1 bar at 460 °C). The total evaporative capacity of the boilers was 1,525,000 lb/hr (192 kg/s) of steam.
- Five Fraser & Chalmers-G.E.C. 32 MW, 11 kV, 3,000 rpm, air-cooled, 2 cylinder impulse, turbo-alternators. Each alternator set had a 40.5 MVA step up transformer to 33 kV.
- The steam condensers worked under a vacuum of 28.3 inches of mercury (719 mm Hg). There were two reinforced concrete, hyperbolic cooling towers, designed by Film Cooling Towers (1925) Limited. Each tower was rated at 3 million gallons per hour (3.79 m^{3}/s). Make up water was abstracted from the Leeds–Liverpool Canal, north of the power station.

== Operations ==
The first generating set was commissioned in June 1952, the second in December 1952, followed by the other sets in September 1955, 1956 and fifth and final set in September 1957.

Operating data for the station over its operating life was as follows:

Year	Net capability, MW	Electricity supplied, GWh	Running hours ( or load factor %)	Thermal efficiency, %
1954	56	435.935	8691	27.93
1955	56	442.294	8727	27.75
1956	84	499.624	8727	27.62
1957	112	666.709	8751	27.72
1958	140	652.179	8568	27.63
1967	150	741.749	(56.4 %)	22.76
1972	150	412.725	(31.3 %)	24.76
1979	150	208.080	(15.8 %)	23.50
1982	150	104.016	(7.9 %)	22.59

Electricity supplied by Huncoat power station, in GWh

== Closure ==
The station was closed by the Central Electricity Generating Board in 1984. The cooling towers were demolished on 16 October 1988, and the two chimneys and the main buildings were demolished in September 1990. The 132 kV grid sub-station to the south of the power station site is still operational. Following the demolition of the main buildings, the administration block remained and was visited and visually recorded by several commentators as an example of derelict industrial archaeology.

== See also ==
- Timeline of the UK electricity supply industry
- List of power stations in England
- List of pre-nationalisation UK electric power companies
- National Grid (UK)
- Padiham and Whitebirk, other stations on the Burnley Coalfield
