= Greater Manchester Waste Disposal Authority =

Former waste disposal authority for Greater Manchester

- Greater Manchester within England
- Abbreviation: GMWDA
- Merged into: Greater Manchester Combined Authority
- Established: 1986; 40 years ago
- Dissolved: 1 April 2018; 8 years ago
- Type: Waste disposal authority
- Purpose: Management and disposal of the municipal waste of Greater Manchester
- Headquarters: Medtia Chambers, 5 Barn Street
- Location: Oldham, United Kingdom
- Region served: Greater Manchester (except Wigan)
- Website: www.gmwda.gov.uk

The Greater Manchester Waste Disposal Authority (GMWDA) was England's largest waste disposal authority, responsible for the management and disposal of municipal waste from Greater Manchester. It dealt with 1.1 million tonnes of waste produced each year, from approximately 1 million households and a population of over 2.27 million in the metropolitan districts of Bolton, Bury, Manchester, Oldham, Rochdale, Salford, Stockport, Tameside and Trafford — though part of Greater Manchester, the Metropolitan Borough of Wigan administers its own waste disposal operations, however they were represented on the authority for administration purposes. The waste came primarily from household waste collections and 20 household waste recycling centres (HWRCs) provided and serviced by the GMWDA. It handled around 4% of the nation's municipal waste.

== History ==
The GMWDA was created under the Local Government Act 1985 to carry out the waste management functions and duties of the Greater Manchester County Council after its abolition in 1986. The authority membership was composed of councillors from across Greater Manchester. Its headquarters were in Oldham. The GMWDA also operated the Recycle for Greater Manchester organisation, its initiatives and website. Following the creation of the Greater Manchester Combined Authority in 2011, GMWDA was an integral part of a pilot local government strategy to demonstrate competence in tackling climate change, energy, water, green infrastructure, transport, waste and other issues affecting the Greater Manchester Statutory City Region.

On 1 April 2018, the GMWDA was abolished and its functions and all property, rights and liabilities were transferred to the Greater Manchester Combined Authority.

== Strategy ==
The GMWDA aimed to deliver at least 50% recycling and 75% diversion from landfill through its contractual guarantee with Viridor Laing (Greater Manchester) Limited.

== Greater Manchester Waste PFI contract ==
In April 2009, the GMWDA signed a 25-year private finance initiative (PFI) waste and recycling contract with Viridor Laing (Greater Manchester) Limited, a partnership between Viridor and John Laing. Since then, a network of 42 recycling and waste management facilities across 24 sites have been constructed. The construction cost was £640 million over five years.

The facilities include:

- 20 HWRCs
- Materials recovery facility which sorts the kerbside recyclable materials (commingled) into different material types, from where they are sent for recycling
- Existing transfer loading station
- Two existing green waste shredding facilities
- Five mechanical biological treatment (MBT) facilities, four with anaerobic digestion which process organic material to produce gases which generate renewable power, and compost-like material
- Four in-vessel composting facilities which treat garden and food waste to produce compost
- Existing thermal recovery facility in Bolton which treats residual waste which cannot be recycled
- Four public education centres (two existing and two new) provide educational resources for school, community and other interested groups.

Residual waste that cannot be recycled, instead of being sent to landfill, was processed into solid recovered fuel (SRF), through the MBT process, for use by chemical producer Ineos Chlor for energy production at its plant at Runcorn. The 275,000 tonnes of fuel fed to the combined heat and power (CHP) plant produced electricity and steam, replacing energy generated from non-renewable sources.

== See also ==
- Bolton Incinerator, a waste treatment processing plant in Bolton
- Keep Britain Tidy, an environmental charity based in Wigan
