= Southport Corporation Tramways =

Tramway operator in England

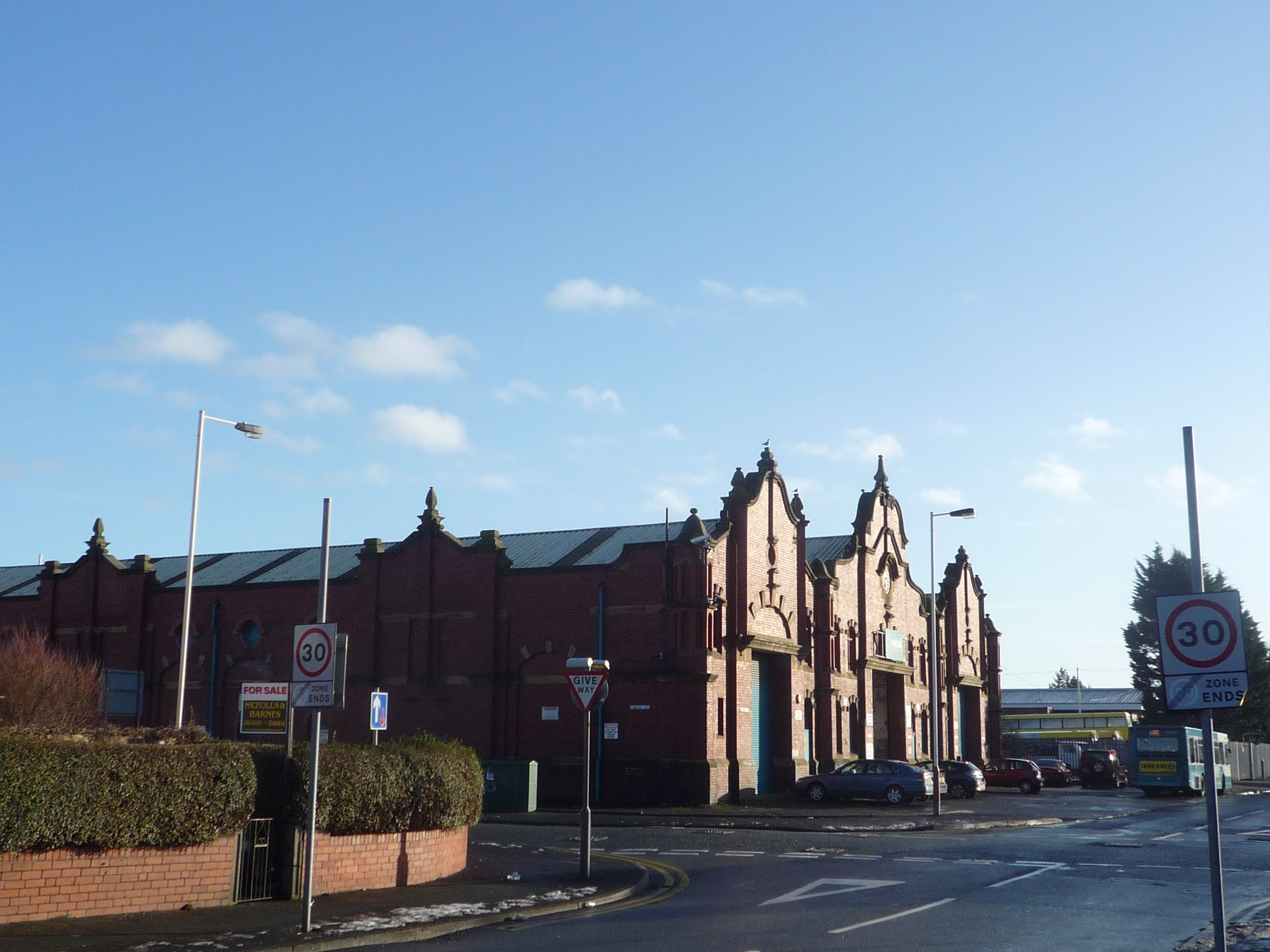
- Depot on Canning Road, Blowick

Operation
- Locale: Southport
- Open: 1 January 1900
- Close: 31 December 1934
- Status: Closed

Infrastructure
- Track gauge: 1,435 mm (4 ft 8 1/2 in)
- Propulsion system: Electric
- Depots: Canning Road, Blowick

Statistics
- Route length: 17.4 miles (28.0 km)

Southport Corporation Tramways operated a tramway service in Southport between 1900 and 1934.

== History ==
In 1896, Southport Corporation purchased the Birkdale and Southport Tramways Company which had operated horse-drawn tramways since 1873. The tracks within its boundary was also purchased, with that in Birkdale being purchased by that council.

In 1899 Southport Corporation obtained permission in the Southport Corporation Tramways Order 1899 to electrify and extend the tramways within its boundaries. Work moved quickly and on 18 July 1900, three routes opened in Southport and electric cars ran. By the end of the year the number of routes had increased to seven, a compact maze of routes serving Smedley, Birkdale, Bedford Park, Kew Gardens, Blowick, Crowlands, High Park and Churchtown.

The depot was in Canning Road, Blowick.

In 1912 Southport absorbed Birkdale and on 1 January 1918, the two tramway systems were finally joined at a cost of £35,000 (equivalent to £3,500,000 in 2025).

== Fleet ==
Southport Corporation fleet eventually reached 45 vehicles.

- 1-12, 14, 16, 18, Electric Railway and Tramway Carriage Works 1900
- 13, 15, 17, 20, 22, 24, 26, 28, 30, 32, 34, Electric Railway and Tramway Carriage Works 1901
- 21 United Electric Car Company 1914
- 23, 25, 27 United Electric Car Company 1915

From Southport Tramways Company the Corporation acquired the following

- 1, 3, 5, 7, 9, 11, 13, 15, 17, 19, 35-44 Brush Electrical Machines 1918
- 29, 31, 33 English Electric 1919

== Closure ==
The system closed on 31 December 1934.

== See also ==
- Southport Pier Tramway
- Southport power station
