= Accrington power station =

Former power station in England

- Country: United Kingdom
- Location: Accrington Lancashire
- Coordinates: 53°45′24″N 02°22′12″W
- Status: Decommissioned and demolished
- Construction began: 1898
- Commission date: 9 November 1900
- Decommission date: 1958
- Owners: Accrington Corporation (1900–1948); British Electricity Authority (1948–1955); Central Electricity Authority (1955–1957); Central Electricity Generating Board (1958)
- Operator: As owner

Thermal power station
- Primary fuel: Coal
- Secondary fuel: Refuse
- Turbine technology: Steam powered engines and turbines
- Chimneys: One (brick built 240 feet)

Power generation
- Units operational: See text
- Nameplate capacity: 15,800 kW (1923)
- Annual net output: 12.681 GWh (1923), 16.854 GWh (1954)

Accrington power station was a coal and refuse fired electricity generating station located in the centre of Accrington, Lancashire. The station supplied electricity to Accrington and to Haslingden and the Altham and Clayton-le-Moors areas between 1900 and 1958.

== History ==
Accrington Corporation sought, and obtained, from the Board of Trade a provisional order to generate and supply electricity to the town in 1890. The Accrington Electric Lighting Order 1890 was confirmed by Parliament in the Electric Lighting Orders Confirmation (No. 4) Act 1890 (53 & 54 Vict. c. clxxxix). Initially little progress was made on the construction of the station, although by 1898 it was reported that tenders for the plant had been received and that construction was about to start. The electricity generating works were built on Argyle Street (53°45′24.1″N 2°22′11.9″W) immediately west of the existing gas works. Accrington power station opened on 9 November 1900. The station was partly operated by burning domestic and commercial refuse.

The original generating plant comprised five engines with a total capacity of 970 brake horse power (723 kW) and five dynamos with a capacity of 580 kW. The engines were powered by steam at 185 psi (12.76 bar). To maintain electricity supply at times of high demand chloride batteries with a total capacity of 750 amp hours are installed. The brick chimney was 240 feet tall (73.2 metres). In 1903 a total of 280 MWh of electricity was supplied to 300 customers.

=== Refuse destructor ===
The refuse destructor was built at the same time as, and was an integral part of, the power station. The destructor was capable of handling 60 tonnes per day of refuse. Refuse was burned in six top-feed Horsfall cells with a total grate area of 180 square feet (16.7 square metres). Lancashire boilers – 7½ by 30 ft (2.3 by 9.1 m) – were located at the back of each cell with a heating surface area of 1,000 square feet (93 m^{2}) each. After combustion clinker and ash made up about 35.5 percent by weight of the refuse burned. In 1904 the clinker was used in the filter beds at the municipal sewage works and some had been sold to another municipal sewage works. The steam from the refuse boilers made up about one fifth of the steam required to drive the generating engines. The cost of the destructor plant and chimney was £8,000.

=== Trams ===
Accrington tramways had operated a tram system since 1886. In 1907, Accrington Corporation had formed Accrington Corporation Tramways and it purchased the tram system. It was converted to electric traction supplied from Accrington power station. The tramway system operated until 1932 when it was closed.

=== Supply growth ===
The corporation made an agreement with the Haslingden Corporation to supply it with electricity in bulk. By 1912 the corporation planned to supply current to the Altham and Clayton-le-Moors areas. It proposed that the latter supply would require a high tension feeder cable (£1,900); a high tension switchboard (£600); and low tension distributors (£3,250); and an allowance for future extensions of £1,000; a total cost of £6,750. The Altham Colliery Company applied to the corporation for a supply of electricity but suitable terms could not be found.

To meet the greater requirements for electricity the corporation proposed to install gas engines to generate electricity rather than using conventional steam turbines. The corporation assumed an installed capacity of 2,000 brake horse power (1,491 kW) and a load factor of 60 percent, it was estimated that such a scheme would realise a saving of £1,000 per year compared to conventional steam generation. Furthermore, that sale of gas generating by-products would realise £1,250 per year. The capital cost of the new plant was estimated to be £27,000. In 1912 the Power Gas Corporation of Stockton-on-Tees installed a 2,000 horse power (1,491 kW) Mond Ammonia recovery gas plant to drive two 1,000 horse power (746 kW) gas engines.

== Specification ==
In 1923 the plant installed at Accrington power station comprised boilers producing 148,000 lb/hr (18.65 kg/s) of steam, and the following generating plant:

- 1 × 2,000 kW steam turbine driving an AC alternator
- 1 × 5,000 kW steam turbine driving an AC alternator
- 1 × 6,000 kW steam turbine driving an AC alternator
- 3 × 750 kW gas engine driving AC alternators
- 1 × 700 kW gas engine driving a DC generator

Electricity was supplied as 230 & 400 Volt 3-phase AC; 230 & 460 Volt DC; and 550 Volt DC for traction current for the tram system.

== Operation ==
The station generated 12.681 GWh in 1923, after use on works and losses, this was distributed to the following users:

Electricity supplies from Accrington power station 1923
User	Current supplied (MWh)
Lighting and domestic	868.070
Public lighting	47.878
Traction	908.958
Power	7,230.394
Bulk supply to other undertakings	718.291
Total	9,773.591

The maximum load on the system inn 1923 was 5,300 kW and there was a connected load of 1,384 kW. The revenue from the sale of current amounted to £81,445. The surplus of revenue over expenses for the Corporation was £45,790.

The nearby Padiham power station was commissioned in January 1927. An 11,000 Volt main was installed between Padiham and Accrington power stations. This allowed the town to obtain an electricity supply from Padiham.

In 1946 Accrington power station sent out 27.566 GWh, had a load factor of 21.6 per cent, and a thermal efficiency of 12.33 per cent.

=== Nationalisation ===
Upon nationalisation of the British electricity supply industry in 1948 the ownership of Accrington power station was vested in the British Electricity Authority, and subsequently the Central Electricity Authority and the Central Electricity Generating Board (CEGB). At the same time the electricity distribution and sales responsibilities of the Accrington electricity undertaking were transferred to the North Western Electricity Board (NORWEB).

=== Final years ===
The commissioning of the modern and efficient Huncoat power station from 1952 made the old and low thermal efficiency Accrington power station less economic to run. In its final years the operation of Accrington power station was as follows.

Operation of Accrington power station, 1954-8
Year	Running hours	Output capacity MW	Electricity supplied GWh	Thermal efficiency %
1954	2791	11	16.854	10.25
1955	2769	11	14.610	10.41
1956	8702	6	12.987	10.69
1957	2733	6	11.651	10.83
1958	2637	6	11.111	12.32

== Closure ==
Accrington power station was closed in 1958.

== See also ==
- Timeline of the UK electricity supply industry
- List of power stations in England
- List of pre-nationalisation UK electric power companies
