= Bolton power stations =

- Country: United Kingdom
- Location: Bolton, Greater Manchester (formerly Lancashire)
- Coordinates: 53°35′35″N 02°25′28″W
- Status: Decommissioned and Demolished
- Construction began: 1894 (Spa Road); 1914 (Back o' th' Bank)
- Commission date: 31 October 1894 (Spa Road); 3 September 1914 (Back o' th' Bank)
- Decommission date: 19 March 1979 (Back o' th' Bank)
- Owners: Bolton Corporation (1894–1948); British Electricity Authority (1948–1955); Central Electricity Authority (1955–1957); Central Electricity Generating Board (1958–1979)
- Operator: As owner

Thermal power station
- Primary fuel: Coal
- Turbine technology: Steam turbines
- Site elevation: 300 ft above ordnance datum
- Chimneys: Spa Road 2, Back o' th' Bank 3
- Cooling towers: Back o' th' Bank 1
- Cooling source: River water and cooling reservoir and cooling tower

Power generation
- Units decommissioned: All decommissioned
- Nameplate capacity: 34 MW (1923), 89 MW (1955–59), 75 MW (1972)
- Annual net output: 38.28 GWh (1923), 189.83 (1955), 46.314 GWh (1971/2)

The two Bolton power stations supplied electric power to the town of Bolton and the wider area between 1894 and 1979. The first power station was located in Bolton town centre but by 1910 was too small to meet the growing demand for electricity. A large coal-fired power station was commissioned in 1914 situated at Back o' th' Bank about 1 mile north of the town centre. The electricity generating station was redeveloped several times until it was closed in 1979 and was subsequently demolished and the site redeveloped.

== History ==
The Corporation of Bolton obtained legal powers under the Bolton Electric Lighting Order 1891, confirmed by the Electric Lighting Orders Confirmation (No. 1) Act 1891 (54 & 55 Vict. c. xlix), to generate and supply electricity throughout the town. Bolton was first supplied with electricity on 31 October 1894 from an electricity works commissioned by the Bolton Corporation. The power station was located on Spa Road (53°34′40″N 2°26′20″W) immediately east of the Spa Fields gas works and extended south to Gas Street. Initially it contained 2 × 100 kW driven by Wood engines.During the next four years the generating plant was added to by four 200 kW Ferranti flywheel alternators, driven by Hick Hargreaves engines. In 1897 the plant had a generating capacity of 1,050 kW and the maximum load was 380 kW. A total of 341.888 MWh of electricity was sold which provided an income to the corporation of £6,693-17-5d. The station supplied current for lighting and power to industrial, commercial and domestic premises in the town, including the electric tram system which opened in 1900. The station was extended again in 1900 to deal with expansion and the tramway load. These were Musgrave engines power Mather & Platt dynamos two rated at 600 kW two at 300 kW.

The municipal ownership of gas, water, electricity, markets and tramways in Bolton generated a relief of 11d. in £1 (£1=240d.) on the rates or local taxes. However, in 1901 it was suggested that Bolton Corporation were making large profits by charging high prices. In 1901 it cost 0.96d. to produce 1 kWh of electricity in Bolton but consumers were charged 3.41 d./kWh, making a profit of 2.45d./kWh. This was compared, unfavourably, to Norwich where the electric company (not a municipal authority) produced electricity for 2.4d./kWh and sold for 3.9d./kWh a profit of 1.5d./kWh. Despite these claims the use of electricity increased.

Electrical power was supplied to the town's textile mills, which had previously used individually generated steam power to drive their machinery. Falcon Mill in Bolton was built between 1904–8 and was the first cotton mill in Lancashire to be powered by electricity.

In 1899 the Bolton Corporation Electric Fittings Department sacked two workers for refusing to work overtime at the basic rate. The Electrical Trades Union escalated the dispute and within a week the department had reinstated the workers. More widely this resulted in new employment conditions: normal weekly hours were reduced from 52 to 50 at 9d. per hour with defined rates for overtime.

== Back o' th' Bank power station ==
By the late-1900s the power station at Spa Road was increasingly unable to meet the growing demand for electricity. In 1912 the Electricity Committee of Bolton Corporation proposed the construction of a new larger power station at Back o' th' Bank (53°35′35″N 2°25′28″W), about 1 mile (1.5 km) north of the town centre. The selected site was west of the River Tonge and east of the Astley Bridge branch of the Lancashire and Yorkshire Railway, and directly across the river from the Denvale cotton mills. The advantages of the site were that the river provided water for condensing steam at the plant and the railway enabled coal fuel to be delivered directly to the station.

The Local Government Board sanctioned the development in 1913. Building work on the new station started in February 1914 and the first 4,000 kW turbo-alternator was commissioned on 3 September 1914. Further plant, including a second 4,000 kW machine, was installed in 1917–18. After the First World War the plant at original generating station at Spa Road was decommissioned, but the site was retained as a transformer substation, for converting AC to DC, and for the distribution of electricity. As of 2020 the frontage of the former generating station in Spa Road is extant.

== Operations ==
To cater for increased demand, new buildings were constructed at Back o' th' Bank for additional plant. Between 1921 and 1923 further steam raising plant was installed consisting of eighteen boilers each capable of supplying 34,000 lb/hr (4.3 kg/s) of steam at a pressure of 225 psi (15.5 bar). The total capacity of steam raising plant was 408,000 lb/hr (51.4 kg/s).

In 1923 the generating machinery comprised 2 × 4,000 kW, 1 × 6,000 kW, 1 × 8,000 kW and 1 × 12,000 kW turbo-alternators. This gave a total generating capacity of 34,000 kW. The No. 6 machine was an English Electric Company 12.5 MW set which was commissioned in October 1923; it was supplied with steam at 200 psi and 528 °F (13.79 bar and 276 °C). This machine remained in operation until 1979, and was moved to the Science and Industry Museum in Manchester as a museum display piece.

The Back o' th' Bank power station generated electricity at 6,400 Volts, 3-phase, 50 Hz; this was transferred to the town through 28 underground cables. Electricity supplies to users were:

- 3-phase, AC, at 400 & 230 V
- 1-phase, AC, at 200 & 100 V
- DC, at 460 & 230 V

The rapid growth in the supply and demand of electricity over the period 1921–23 is illustrated in the table.

Electricity supply, load and revenue, 1921–3
Year	1921	1922	1923
Maximum Load, kW	14,180	15,530	17,870
Total connections	33,198	38,717	42,502
Electricity generated, GWh	36.662	38.464	45.531
Electricity sold, GWh	30.299	31.876	38.280
Revenue from sales	̅	£216,265	£229,750
Surplus of revenue over expenses	̶	£103,070	£141,244

Of the 38.280 GWh sold in 1923, this was supplied to the following users.

Electricity use and cost, 1923
	Lighting and domestic supplies	Public lighting	Traction	Power	Bulk supply to other undertakings	Total
Electricity sold, GWh	2.985	none	6.456	28.824	0.015	38.280
Percent	7.80%	0%	16.87%	75.30%	0.04%	100%
Cost d./kWh	4.46	—	1.32	1.15	—	1.44

The condensing of steam in the station was by river water, abstracted from, and returned to the River Tonge. Initially the water was cooled in 4 spray ponds north of the station, each had a capacity of 0.75 million gallons per hour (0.95 m^{3}/s). In about 1950 a hyperbolic reinforced concrete cooling tower was built with a capacity of 2.5 million gallons per hour (3.15 m^{3}/s). This was located on the east side of the River Tonge north of the Denvale Mills. However, there were complaints that operation of the cooling tower let to problems with ice in cold weather. The Back o' th' Bank power station had two chimneys on the north side and later an additional single chimney to the south of the station.

By the mid-1920s the Lancashire Power Company and the Corporations of Manchester, Salford, Bolton and Rochdale had interconnected their electricity systems to share the production and supply of electricity. The combined output capacity of the system was 650 GWh.

In 1927 the Central Electricity Board (CEB) assumed responsibility across the country for directing the operation of 'selected' power stations and paying for their operation. Back o' th' Bank became a selected station. Bolton Corporation had the right to buy the electricity they required from the Board.

The CEB built the first stages of the National Grid between 1927–33. Back o' th' Bank power station was connected to an electricity grid ring which included Padiham, Rawtenstall and Kearsley power stations, this was one of three electricity rings in the North West.The others were: Preston, Southport, Liverpool, Warrington and Wigan; and Manchester, Oldham, Tame Valley and Stockport.

Further turbo-alternators were installed at Back o' th' Bank during the late 1940s, whilst some of the older equipment was decommissioned because of its age and deteriorating condition. The steam plant in the low pressure station was decommissioned in 1952.

== Nationalisation ==
Upon nationalisation of the British electricity supply industry in 1948 the ownership of Back o' th' Bank power station was vested in the British Electricity Authority, and subsequently the Central Electricity Authority and the Central Electricity Generating Board (CEGB). At the same time the electricity distribution and sales responsibilities of the Bolton electricity undertaking were transferred to the North Western Electricity Board (NORWEB).

The operational electricity generating capacity by the late 1950s was 89 MW. The amount of electricity sent out (in GWh) was as follows.

Electricity sent out from Back o' th' Bank, 1946–72 (GWh)

In 1958 the Bolton electricity district supplied an area of 56 square miles and a population of 190,600. The amount of electricity sold and the number and types of consumers was as follows:

Year	Electricity sold, MWh	No. of consumers
1956	300,438	69,191
1957	315,162	69,842
1958	337,913	70,383

In 1958 the above totals were made up of the following:

Type of Consumer	No. of consumers	Electricity sold, MWh
Residential	62,238	96,179
Shops, offices, etc.	4,000	32,151
Combined premises	2,912	10,509
Factories	881	194,001
Farms	348	2,206
Public traction	1	649
Public lighting	3	2,218
Total	70,383	337,913

By 1971 the plant at Back o' th' Bank comprised three 31.25 MW turbo-alternators, the maximum output capacity was 75 MW and in the year ending 31 March 1972 the electricity supplied from the station was 46.136 GWh.

Back o' th' Bank power station was closed by the CEGB and ceased to generate electricity on 19 March 1979. The station was subsequently demolished, the area was redeveloped with office, warehouse, industrial and leisure facilities.

== See also ==
- Kearsley power station
- Bolton WtE
