= Burnley Corporation Tramways =

Tramway operator in lancashire, England

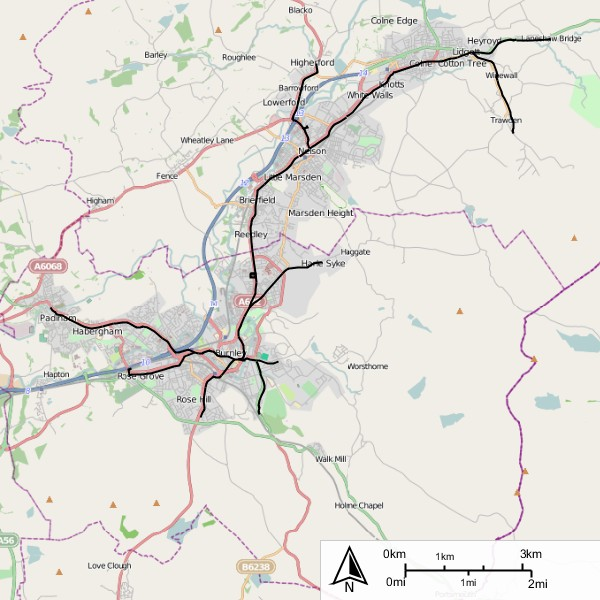
- Map of the tramways of Burnley, Nelson and Colne

Operation
- Locale: Burnley
- Open: 16 December 1901
- Close: 7 May 1935
- Status: Closed

Infrastructure
- Track gauge: 4 ft (1,219 mm)
- Propulsion system: Electric
- Depots: Queensgate, Burnley

Statistics
- Route length: 13.05 miles (21.00 km)

Burnley Corporation Tramways operated a tramway service in Burnley between 1901 and 1935.

== History ==
In 1900, the assets of the Burnley and District Tramways Company were purchased by Burnley Corporation for the sum of £53,000 (equivalent to £5,632,306 in 2025). This had operated standard gauge steam hauled trams since 1881. The corporation rebuilt the tramway to 4' gauge, as this was in use by neighbouring systems, and there were plans to link to these systems. The tramway was powered by direct current electricity at 530/565 volts supplied from Burnley power station.

The first converted route to Padiham opened on 16 December 1901, and the second in 1902 to Nelson, which permitted through running onto Nelson Corporation Tramways tracks.

In July 1903 a route to Rosegrove opened, and in February 1904 to Towneley Park and Summit. In 1910 new routes to Gannow Lane and Lane Head were opened.

Extensions were made in 1910 on the Towneley Park route as far as Rock Lane. The Summit line was extended to Rossendale Road. In 1912, the Lane Head route was extended to Harle Syke.

In 1924 the company name changed from Burnley Corporation Tramways to Burnley Corporation Tramways and Omnibuses.

== Fleet ==
The company amassed a fleet of 72 vehicles:

- 1-24 G.F. Milnes & Co. 1901 (10 was renumbered 68 after rebuilding following the accident in 1923).
- 25-38 G.F. Milnes & Co. 1903
- 39-46 ERTCW 1903
- 47 United Electric Car Company 1907
- 48-52 Hurst Nelson 1909
- 53-54 United Electric Car Company 1910
- 55-57 United Electric Car Company 1911
- 58-67 United Electric Car Company 1913
- 68-72 English Electric 1921 (68 was later renumbered 73

== Accident of 1923 ==
On 21 December 1923 a coal lorry collided with a tram No 10 on Briercliffe Road. This sent the tramcar backwards down the road. The tramcar derailed and crashed into a house and shop on the corner of Sedbergh St. The conductor, William Simpson, and a 14-year-old schoolgirl, Ethel Pomfret were killed. Seven other passengers were injured.

== Closure ==
Burnley, Nelson and Colne became a combined transport undertaking on 1 April 1933. The new organisation closed down the remaining tramway services in Burnley on 7 May 1935.
