= Huncoat =

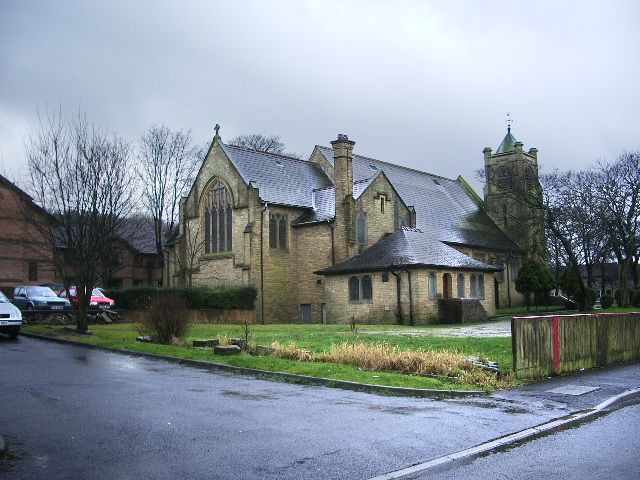
- St Augustine's Church

- Location in Hyndburn Location within Lancashire
- Population: 4,418 (2011 Census)
- OS grid reference: SD775305
- District: Hyndburn
- Shire county: Lancashire
- Region: North West
- Country: England
- Sovereign state: United Kingdom
- Post town: ACCRINGTON
- Postcode district: BB5
- Dialling code: 01254
- Police: Lancashire
- Fire: Lancashire
- Ambulance: North West
- UK Parliament: Hyndburn

Huncoat /ˈhʌnkoʊt/ is a village in Lancashire, England; situated in the North West. It is located to the east of Accrington. It is a ward of Hyndburn where the population taken at the 2011 census was 4,418.

Huncoat railway station is on the East Lancashire Line.

== History ==
The name is of Anglo-Saxon origin where Hun, or Hunna was a family name and Cotte is an Old English name for a shelter for animals. The brief details of the Blackburnshire hundred in the Domesday survey, mention Huncoat with King Edward holding two carucates of land here.

Huncoat Colliery 53°46′23″N 2°20′49″W on the Burnley Coalfield was sunk by George Hargreaves and Company between 1890 and 1893. Before 1930, the company had linked its Calder and Scaitcliffe Collieries to Huncoat underground and it wound the coal from all three pits. The colliery was nationalised in 1947 and closed after its coal was exhausted in 1968. The coal-fired Huncoat Power Station was located at the eastern end of the village, off Altham Lane and operated from 1952 to 1984.

A manufacturer of Accrington brick, the Huncoat Plastic Brick and Terracotta Co was established in Yorkshire Street in 1894. The bricks carried the REDAC trademark and they also made other Fireclay-based building products, and closed in 1992. By 1909 railway sidings here connected to a mineral railway network servicing the two plants of the Accrington Brick and Tile Co on Whinney Hill in Altham.

== Governance ==
Huncoat was once a township in the ancient parish of Whalley, this became a civil parish in 1866, forming part of the Burnley Rural District from 1894. However, on 1 April 1929 the parish was abolished and merged with Accrington, the area became part of Accrington Municipal Borough (until 1974). In 1921 the parish had a population of 1380. It has is now in the unparished area of Accrington.

== Sport ==
A grassroots junior football club called Huncoat United was formed in 1984 and became an FA Charter Standard Club in 2005. FA Charter Standard clubs must meet and keep standards of child protection, coaching and administration. Huncoat United has many teams playing in the Accrington and District JFL (ADJFL), East Lancashire Football Alliance (ELFA), North Bury JFL (NBJFL), Bolton & Bury DFL (BBDFL), West Lancs Girls FL (WLGFL) and North Valley & Burnley Unity Youth League (NVBUYL). The club has teams from U7's through all age groups up to U18's. All coaches are FA qualified to minimum Level One and all members CRC cleared. The club also runs a turn up and play Mini-League every Saturday morning for boys and girls aged 5–9.

== Notable people ==
- Harold Davenport, mathematician
- Hollie Steel, child soprano
- Diana Vickers, an actress, singer-songwriter and fashion designer
- Jon Anderson, founding member of the rock group Yes

== See also ==
- Listed buildings in Accrington
