= Bolton WtE =

Incinerator in Greater Manchester, England

- Country: England
- Location: Greater Manchester, North West England
- Coordinates: 53.5661°N 2.4091°W
- Status: Operational
- Commission date: 1971
- Operator: Greater Manchester Waste

Thermal power station
- Primary fuel: Waste

Power generation
- Nameplate capacity: 11 MW

The Bolton WtE is a waste power station constructed in 1971 in Bolton, and is a major landmark of its skyline. The incinerator burns up to 20 tonnes (22 tons) of household waste per hour or 85,000 t (94,000 tons) per year, and can generate up to 11 MW of electricity. The plant is operated by Suez Recycling and Recovery UK. The Bolton incinerator is the only household waste incinerator in Greater Manchester.

== See also ==
- Greater Manchester Waste Disposal Authority
- List of incinerators in the UK
- Bolton power stations
