= Padiham railway station =

Railway station in Lancashire, England

Padiham

General information
- Location: Padiham, Burnley, Lancashire; England
- Coordinates: 53.7987°N 2.3166°W
- Platforms: 2

Other information
- Status: Disused

History
- Original company: Lancashire and Yorkshire Railway
- Pre-grouping: London and North Western Railway
- Post-grouping: London, Midland and Scottish Railway

Key dates
- 15 October 1877: Opened
- 2 December 1957: Closed to regular passenger services
- 17 June 1968: closed completely
Location

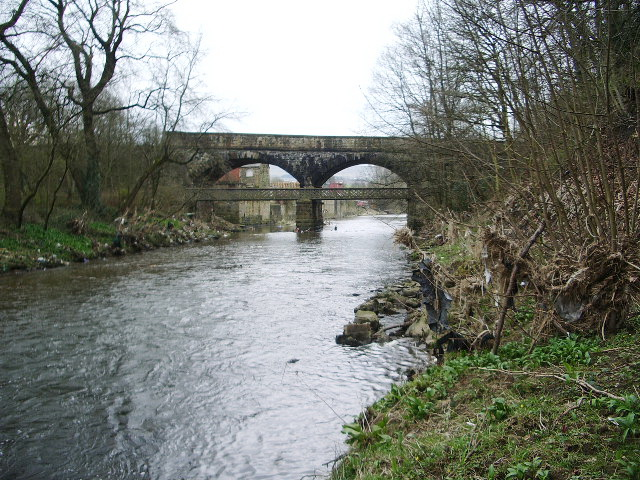
Looking south towards the railway bridge over the River Calder between Padiham railway station and the line to Padiham power station and Simonstone. The iron footbridge links Memorial park with the lower section in Park Road. On the east bank are the remains of Padiham Gas works (date:2008)

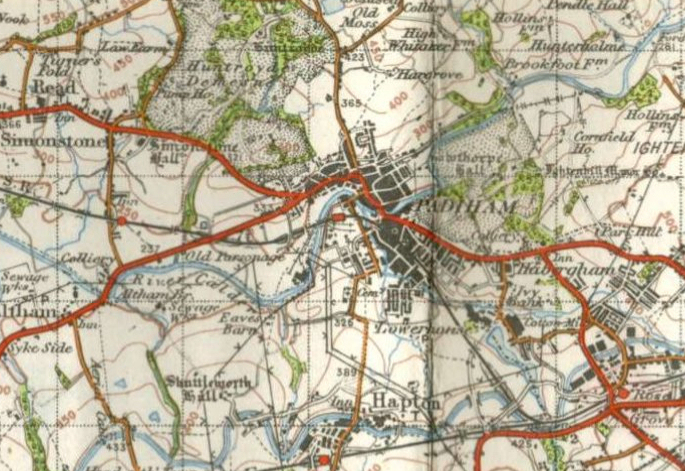
1948 Ordnance Survey map showing location of Padiham station and local rail connections with Rose Grove railway station and Hapton railway station on the main line (both still open) and Simonstone railway station (closed) to the west

Padiham railway station in Station Road, Padiham, Lancashire, England was on a branch line (usually known as the Great Harwood loop) of the East Lancashire Line from Burnley to Blackburn.

== History ==
The line between Padiham and Rose Grove opened in 1875. West of Padiham it opened two years later as a result of difficulties in constructing the embankments between Great Harwood and Simonstone.

It was closed to regular passenger services on 2 December 1957 but occasional special trains operated until completely closed in 1968. Subsequently the station was later demolished. The railway line from Burnley to Simonstone was retained for continuing deliveries of coal to Padiham power station until the power station closed in 1993.

The nearest station for Padiham is now at Hapton, about 2 miles (3 km) south of the town.

== Greenway ==
Lancashire County Council began work in 2005 to convert part of the line to a footpath/bridleway/cycle path to be called Padiham Greenway. The route stretches from Mollywood Lane, Rose Grove to Padiham Memorial Park and is about 1.5 miles (2 km) long. The Greenway was officially opened on 24 June 2010. It is known by locals as the old railway.

It links to the River Calder Greenway and the towpath of the Leeds and Liverpool Canal to form a circular route and also has a branch to Gawthorpe Hall a National Trust property in Padiham. The route also links to the East Lancashire line at Hapton, Rose Grove and Burnley Barracks.

Preceding station	Disused railways	Following station
Simonstone; Line and station closed	Lancashire and Yorkshire Railway; Great Harwood Loop	Rose Grove; Station open
