= Lancashire Electric Power Company =

- Company type: Public limited company
- Industry: Energy: Electricity generation and supply
- Founded: 1900
- Defunct: 31 March 1948
- Fate: Abolished by nationalisation
- Successor: British Electricity Authority and North Western Electricity Board
- Headquarters: 196 Deansgate, Manchester, United Kingdom
- Number of locations: 3 power stations
- Area served: Lancashire south of the Ribble (1,200 square miles)
- Key people: George Balfour (Conservative politician) Chairman 1938
- Products: Electric power
- Services: Electricity supply
- Net income: £169,138 (1923)
- Divisions: Supply districts, 11 in 1923, 8 in 1948

The Lancashire Electric Power Company was one of the largest private electricity companies in the UK. It was established in 1900 and generated and supplied electricity to 1,200 squares miles of Lancashire from 1905 until its abolition under nationalisation in 1948.

== Electric power companies ==
=== Legal background ===
Lancashire Electric Power Act 1900
- Act of Parliament
- Parliament of the United Kingdom
- Long title: An Act for incorporating and conferring powers on the Lancashire Electric Power Company.
- Citation: 63 & 64 Vict. c. ccxxxv

Dates
- Royal assent: 6 August 1900

The Lancashire Electric Power Company was established under the provisions of the Lancashire Electric Power Act 1900 (63 & 64 Vict. c. ccxxxv). This was one of several acts passed in 1900 and 1901 that defined the legal powers of electricity supply companies. They were enabled to generate and supply, in perpetuity, electricity to authorised undertakings and for industrial and manufacturing purposes over a wide area. A standard clause safeguarded the privileges of existing company and local authority electricity undertakings. Despite this safeguarding the Lancashire Electric Power Bill had met with considerable opposition in Parliament during 1900. The Lord Mayor of Manchester and many local authorities had taken steps to oppose the Second Reading of the bill. They saw a powerful electricity company as a threat to their municipal privileges. Nevertheless, the act was passed and the power company was established.

Others companies and their empowering acts in 1900 and 1901 included Newcastle-upon-Tyne Electric Supply Company Act 1900 (63 & 64 Vict. c. ccxl); North Metropolitan Electric Power Supply Act 1900 (63 & 64 Vict. c. cclxxvi); South Wales Electrical Power Distribution Company Act 1900 (63 & 64 Vict. c. cclxxxii); Cleveland and Durham County Electric Power Act 1901 (1 Edw. 7. c. civ); Yorkshire Electric Power Act 1901 (1 Edw. 7. c. cxvi); and the Derbyshire and Nottinghamshire Electric Power Act 1901 (1 Edw. 7. c. cxxi).

Lancashire Electric Power Act 1906
- Act of Parliament
- Parliament of the United Kingdom
- Long title: An Act to enlarge the powers of the Lancashire Electric Power Company and for other purposes.
- Citation: 6 Edw. 7. c. cxcix

Dates
- Royal assent: 4 August 1906

The Lancashire Company sought further supply powers in 1906, these were granted under the terms of the Lancashire Electric Power Act 1906 (6 Edw. 7. c. cxcix). The company now supplied electricity to all of Lancashire south of the Ribble, except for the Boroughs of Manchester, Salford, Liverpool, Bootle, Southport and central Bolton, an area of about 1,200 square miles.

== Electricity supply ==
The company's original generating station was the Radcliffe Power Station which was opened by the Earl of Derby on 9 October 1905. This had two 1,500 kW turbo-alternator sets manufactured by British Thomson-Houston, generated at 10 kV (the first power station in the UK to transmit by bare electric conductors at 10kV).

The first customer was the Acme Spinning Company in Pendlebury which with 75,000 spindles was the first cotton spinning mill in Lancashire to be designed for powering by electricity.

The plant at Radcliffe was soon duplicated with six boilers feeding four 1,500 kW sets. The equipment was so simple that the whole power station could be operated by a shift of six or seven men. It reached full capacity in December 1922 with ten sets giving an electricity generating capacity of 42,375 kW.

=== Interconnections ===
During the First World War discussions were held on cooperation between undertakings. The Lancashire Electric Power Company, Manchester Corporation and Salford Corporation linked up their five power stations and their distribution networks forming an interconnected system from Manchester to Wigan.

In 1923 the maximum electrical load on the system was 34,000 MW and there were 47,000 connections on the system. Radcliffe power station generated 90,378 GWh. The power sold was used as follows:

Lancashire Electric Power Company
Electricity Use	Electricity sold, GWh	Percent
Lighting and domestic	1,431.0	1.88
Public lighting	56.7	0.07
Traction	137.5	0.18
Power	51,768.0	67.98
Bulk supply to other undertakings	22,760.0	29.89
Total	76,155.0	100.00

The area of supply Lancashire Electric Power Company was divided into 11 districts: Barton-upon-Irwell, Bury Road, Kearsley, Little Hulton, Little Lever, Ramsbottom, Tottington, Tyldesley, Westhoughton, Whitefield and Worsley.

In 1923 the revenue from the sales of current was £300,620 giving surplus of revenue over expenses for the company of £169,138.

In the mid-1920s Bolton and Rochdale also joined the network which then had a combined output of 650 GWh. Schematic diagrams of the Lancashire electricity system are held by the Science Museum Group and some are available online.

=== New stations and the grid ===
A second power station was commissioned at Padiham in 1926 with a generating capacity of 30,625 kW and a third at Kearsley in November 1929 with eventually two 32,000 kW and two 51,600 kW generating sets. Kearsley was able to burn waste material from local factories.

All three power stations became 'selected' stations of the Central Electricity Board (CEB) which was able to select which power stations were to generate and supply electricity.

When the national grid was being constructed between 1928 and 1933 an interconnected ‘Lancashire ring’ was formed encompassing Bolton, Padiham, Rawtenstall, and Kearsley. By the late 1930s the company were supplying electricity to spinners and weavers, iron. steel and coal industries, bleachers and dyers, engineering works, railways and electro-chemical processes. During 1937 a total of 791 GWh of electricity were sold to 143,000 consumers and 342 GWh were taken by the CEB. The company's profit that year was £182,000.

By 1948 the Lancashire Electric Power Company had been divided into eight supply districts: Chorley, Golborne, Mid-Lancs., Ormskirk, Ramsbottom, Westhoughton, Whitefield, and Worsley. The districts were interconnected by 33 kV mains and transformer stations.

== Nationalisation ==
The British electricity supply industry was nationalised in 1948. The Lancashire Electric Power Company was dissolved on 31 March 1948. Its power stations at Radcliffe, Padiham and Kearsley and the high voltage transmission lines were vested in the British Electricity Authority. The low voltage distribution network and the electricity sales functions were vested in the North Western Electricity Board when the total capacity was 284,750 kW.

Radcliffe Power Station closed in 1959, Padiham "A" in 1969 and Kearsley in 1981. Padiham "A" was replaced by a new power station on an adjacent site in the late 1950s (Padiham "B") but finally closed in 1993.

The company pioneered accurate metering with its own Meter and Testing Department in Walkden.

== See also ==
- List of pre-nationalisation UK electric power companies
