= Norwich power stations =

Former electricity generating stations

Norwich Power Stations
- Country: United Kingdom
- Location: Norwich, Norfolk
- Coordinates: 52°37′15″N 01°19′06″E
- Status: Decommissioned and Demolished
- Commission date: Duke Street: 1893; LP station: 1926; HP station: 1937; Gas turbine: 1964
- Decommission date: LP: 1967; HP: 1975; Gas turbine: 1986
- Construction cost: Duke Street 1890 capital of £50,000
- Owners: Norwich Electricity Company Limited (1890–1902); Norwich Corporation Electricity Works (1902–1948); British Electricity Authority (1948–1955); Central Electricity Authority (1955–1957); Central Electricity Generating Board (1958–1986)
- Operator: As owner

Thermal power station
- Primary fuel: Coal, Fuel oil (gas turbines)
- Turbine technology: Steam engines and steam turbines. Open cycle gas turbines
- Chimneys: Duke Street: 1. LP/HP: 1. Gas turbine: 2
- Cooling towers: None
- Cooling source: River water
- Combined cycle?: No
- Cogeneration?: No

Power generation
- Units operational: LP: 42.5 MW. HP: 31 MW. Gas turbine: 2 x 55 MW
- Units decommissioned: All
- Nameplate capacity: Duke Street 180 kW. LP: 40 MW. HP: 30 MW. Gas turbine: 110 MW
- Annual net output: See graphs in text

The Norwich power stations were a sequence of electricity generating stations that provided electric power to the City of Norwich and the wider area between 1893 and 1986. The first station in Duke Street began operating in 1893, a new power station at Thorpe was in service from 1926 to 1967, this was supplemented with a 'high pressure' station, 1937–1975, and finally a gas turbine station operated from 1964–1986.

== History ==
Norwich was first lit by electric lighting in 1881. R.E. Crompton and Company lit the Market Place with two arc lights. Later that year the Norwich Fisheries Exhibition was lit with 9 arc lights and 60 incandescent lamps. The lighting system, at a cost of £400, was expanded across the city supplied from a generating station behind St. Andrew’s Hall on Elm Hill. This facility comprised a 20 horsepower (14.9 kW) twin cylinder steam engine driving six Crompton-Burgin dynamos. Four dynamos supplied a total of 20 arc lights in Haymarket, Market Place, Bank Plain, Post Office Plain, St. Andrew’s Hall, London Street and Prince of Wales Road as far as the railway station. Another of the dynamos supplied 50 incandescent lamps in the Free Library, the sixth dynamo was a spare. The system operated for about a year, but like many early electric lighting schemes in Britain, was uneconomic compared to gas lighting to which the city reverted in March 1883.

== Duke Street Station ==
The local businessman Jeremiah Colman lit his Carrow Road mustard factory by electricity from about 1890, and began a public lighting supply in the local area. The Norwich Electricity Company Limited (sometimes referred to as the Norwich Electrical Supply Company or the Norwich Electric Light Company) was founded in 1890 and purchased land at Duke’s Wharf off Duke Street immediately south of, and adjoining, the River Wensum (52°37′54″N 1°17′34″E). The company's founding directors were G. F. Buxton, A. R Chamberlain, I. B. Coaks, R. J. Colman, Sir C. R. Gilman, and F. W. Harmer (chairman). The company raised a capital of £50,000 through the sale of £10 shares.

A power station was built to the designs of Edward Boardman and the electricity supply started on 3 August 1893. The station faced Duke Street with the boiler house adjacent to the river, there was a coal yard adjoining the river to the west of the site for the delivery of coal by barge. The power station initially comprised three 100 horsepower (74.6 kW) steam engines and dynamos generating 180 kW of direct current. Electricity was distributed through bare copper wires in sealed sanitary drain pipes. Industry was supplied with 220 V DC and domestic consumers 110 V DC. Among the industrial users were Norwich Electric Tramways that served the city from July 1900 until December 1935.

In 1897 the plant had a generating capacity of 850 kW and the maximum load was 750 kW. A total of 602.2 MWh of electricity was sold which powered 38,000 lamps, this provided an income to the company of £11,005-127.

As demand for electricity grew so further expansion took place: a new engine room and a boiler house were built in 1900 to house the new generators. By 1903 there were 13 machines ranging from 100 to 700 horsepower (74.7 to 522 kW); they were supplied with steam from Babcock and Wilcox coal-fired boilers.

The Norwich Corporation (Electricity, &c.) Act 1902 (2 Edw. 7. c. cliii). authorised the transfer of the electricity undertaking to the Norwich Corporation and an Electricity Committee was established to manage electricity supplies. The electricity undertaking was then known as the Norwich Corporation Electricity Works.

In 1912 mechanised boiler stokers were introduced and the steam engines began to be replaced with steam turbines of up to 1,000 horsepower (746 kW) driving 500 kW dynamos. In 1913 there were 1,750 electric street lights in use across the city, and a growing demand for electricity from industry. The growth of electricity supplies increased from 186,500 kWh in 1894, to 1,481,179 kWh (1902) and to 6,472,386 (1912).

In 1923 the AC generating plant comprised 1 × 3 MW and 1 × 5 MW turbo generators (moved to Thorpe site when Duke Street closed) providing a 400 V and 230 V AC supply. The DC plant comprised 1 × 0.5 MW, 1 × 1 MW and 1 × 2 MW turbo generators plus 1 × 0.75 reciprocating generator providing a 220 V and 440 V DC supply. In 1923 a total of 14.513 MWh of electricity was sold raising a total revenue of £171,327 for Norwich Corporation.

By the mid 1920s the Duke Street site had reached the size limit for further expansion, the Corporation resolved to build a new power station at Thorpe on the southern outskirts of the city. The Duke Street site was redeveloped as stores and workshops for the company.

== Norwich power station 1926–75 ==
The new power station at Thorpe (52°37′15″N 1°19′06″E) to the south of Crown Point railway depot opened on 28 October 1926. Initially it consisted of a low-pressure (LP) coal-fired station with chain-grate boilers. At opening the station contained 2 x 5,000 kW turbo alternators with a third similar set to be transferred from Duke Street. The station was extended in 1928 by a 12,500-kW set and two 50,000-Ib. boilers. In October 1932 a BTH 15,000-kW turbo alternator unit powered from a 75,0000 Ib/hr Stirling boiler.

Cooling water was taken from, and returned to, the River Wensum. A rail siding was built to deliver coal and remove ash from the station. Coal was also delivered by collier and barge. The station had a single chimney. In 1926 the station generated 24 GWh over the year, by 1936 this had increased to 134 GWh.

In 1927 the Central Electricity Board (CEB) assumed responsibility across the country for directing the operation of ‘selected’ power stations and paying for their operation. Norwich Council had the right to buy the electricity they required from the Board. The CEB also built the first stages of the National Grid (1927–33).

In the late 1920s concerns were raised about the lack of electricity in rural areas. The government set up two rural demonstration schemes one at Bedford and one at Norwich. The Norwich demonstration scheme was ready by 1931. It was centred on Reepham and covered 125 square miles providing electricity for 14,000 people in 4,000 dwellings. The cost of the scheme was £60,000 for 60 miles of 3-phase and 40 miles of single phase transmission lines. The schemes were expected to achieve payback in 7 years. Some evidence showed that where rural areas were developed in conjunction with urban schemes the added cost was comparatively low. However, it was acknowledged that electricity for dispersed rural communities was difficult to provide without financial aid.

In the late 1930s a high-pressure (HP) power station was constructed adjacent to the LP station. It had rated output capacity of 30 MW; its first equipment was installed in 1937. There were four boilers which delivered a total of 480,000 lb/hr (60.5 kg/s) of steam at a pressure of 650 psi (44.8 bar) and at 454 °C. There was a single 31 MW turbo-alternator.

Upon nationalisation of the British electricity supply industry in 1948 the ownership of Norwich power stations were vested in the British Electricity Authority, and subsequently the Central Electricity Authority and the Central Electricity Generating Board (CEGB). At the same time the electricity distribution and sales responsibilities of the Norwich undertaking were transferred to the Eastern Electricity Board.

By the late 1950s there were three 5 MW, one 12.5 MW, and one 15 MW British Thomson-Houston turbo-alternators; and one 31 MW Parsons set. By 1961 the LP station was rated at 42.5 MW and the HP station at 31 MW.

Combined annual electricity output, in GWh, of the HP/LP stations from 1954

In 1958 the Norwich electricity district supplied an area of 667 square miles and a population of 263,700. The amount of electricity sold and the number and types of consumers was as follows:

Year	Electricity sold, MWh	No. of consumers
1956	238259	86,344
1957	256,592	88,667
1958	276,079	91,113

In 1958 the above totals were made up of the following:

Type of Consumer	No. of consumers	Electricity sold, MWh
Domestic	78,858	132,130
Commercial	6,223	48,990
Combined premises	2,173	8,025
Farms	2,401	15,873
Industrial	1,436	67,049
Public lighting	22	4,012
Total	91,113	276,079

The LP station was decommissioned in 1967 and the HP station continued in operation until 1975, and the whole of the site was demolished in 1981-82.

== Gas turbine station ==
In 1964 a quick response oil-fired gas turbine plant was erected to the west of the HP/LP steam station. This was intended to provide power at times of peak demand, and similar plants was installed at the other power stations within the CEGB’s South Eastern Region. These included at Rye House, Hertfordshire; Tilbury B, Essex; Croydon, London; and Hastings, Sussex. At Norwich four gas turbines powered two 55 MW generators. The station had two reinforced concrete chimneys.

Annual output of the gas turbines, in GWh, over the lifetime of the power station

The increased output in 1984–5 was associated with the 1984–5 miners strike when the availability of coal was reduced. The gas turbine plant was decommissioned in 1996 and subsequently demolished.

A 132 kV substation to the east of the HP/LP station provided a connection to the national grid, this is extant (in 2020). Two tall pylons once provided a national grid crossing clear of navigation on the river, these were dismantled in 2017.
