= Kearsley Power Station =

Former coal-fired power station

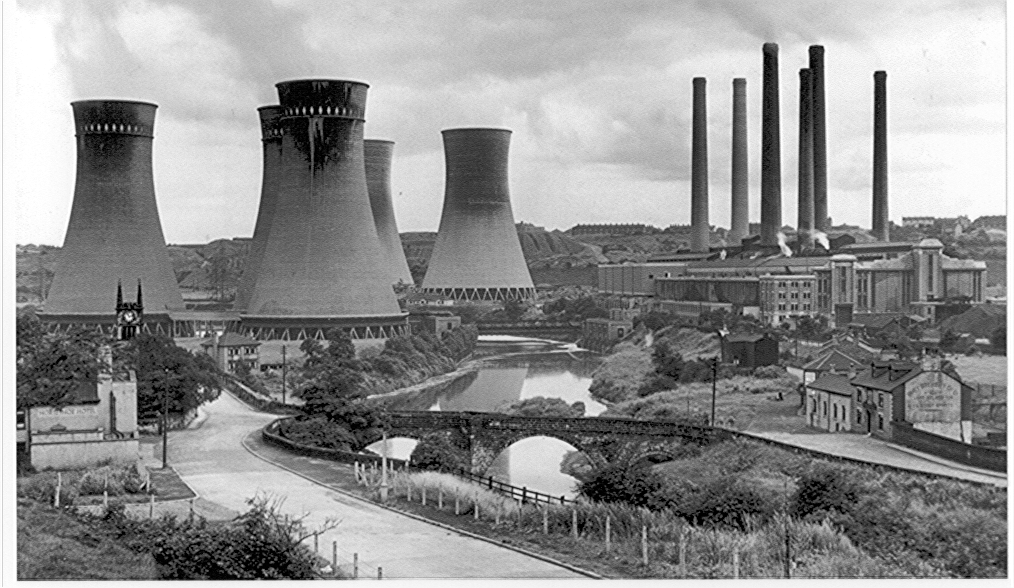
- Kearsley Power Station
- Country: England
- Location: Greater Manchester
- Coordinates: 53°32′22″N 2°21′33″W
- Status: Decommissioned and demolished
- Commission date: 1929
- Decommission date: 1980
- Operators: Lancashire Electric Power Company (1929–1948); British Electricity Authority (1948–1955); Central Electricity Authority (1955–1957); Central Electricity Generating Board (1948–1980)

Thermal power station
- Primary fuel: Coal
- Cooling towers: 5
- Cooling source: Circulating water cooling towers

Power generation
- Units operational: 2 × 52 MW, 2 × 51.66 MW (1971)
- Units decommissioned: All decommissioned
- Annual net output: 294.949 GWh (1971)

External links
- Commons: Related media on Commons

Kearsley Power Station was a coal-fired power station in Stoneclough, near Kearsley, Bolton, England. It was designed in 1927 by Dr H. F. Parshall for the Lancashire Electric Power Company. The original installation was known as Kearsley 'A', comprising two British Thomson-Houston (B.T.H.) turbo-alternators rated at 32.25 megawatts each powered by steam supplied from eight Babcock & Wilcox boilers of 75,000 lb/hr. Further extensions became Kearsley 'B' (1936-38), with two more B.T.H. turbo-alternators each capable of producing 51.6 megawatts. Finally Kearsley 'C' (1949) was completed with two more B.T.H. machines rated at 52 megawatts each powered by eight Babcock & Wilcox boilers of 160,000 lb/hr. The station closed in 1980, and the 5 cooling towers were demolished during the week of 14 May 1985.

== History ==
The power station opened in 1929 by the Earl of Derby, was to become highly regarded within the industry due to its excellent record of thermal efficiency. The power station went on to set new records for low coal consumption in relation to power output. Due to increased power demands there were a further two extensions made to the site in 1936 when a 51,600 kW set was installed and 1949, one of which was a new cooling tower reported at the time to be the tallest in the world. The 1936 extension was attended by the Earl of Derby, son of the original Earl of Derby who had opened the company's Radcliffe Power Station 31 years previously.

Originally 'A' Station had four cast iron chimneys but these were replaced by two brick built stacks, each 275 feet high. The later 'B' and 'C' stations each had two brick chimneys of 325 feet high. When completed the adjoining boiler houses totalled 255 yards and the entire buildings and chimneys used several million bricks. It is estimated that the six chimneys alone used at least 8 million bricks.

By 1937 the station supplied a maximum load of 101,800 kW of electricity.

When completed in 1949 there were 24 coal burning boilers at Kearsley Power Station, each separate station had eight boilers with six or seven boilers needed to operate each station on full load. There was always spare boiler capacity; the original operators the Lancashire Electric Power Company learning from its experiences at Padiham Power Station which was under boilered. Kearsley 'A' Station boilers burned 5 tons of coal each on full load, and the larger 'B' and 'C' Station boilers consumed 8 tons of coal an hour on full load. Until 1970 there were continuous improvements to the boilers and plant at Kearsley to improve efficiency and reduce running costs.

The electricity output from Kearsley LP and HP power stations was:

Electricity sent out, GWh
Year	LP station output GWh	HP station output GWh
1946	933.52	
1953/4	102.21	1106.26
1954/5	92.98	873.26
1955/6	63.46	5.42
1956/7	66.80	824.56
1957/8	74.32	590.24
1960/1	700.366	
1961/2	707.587	
1962/3	746.484	
1966/7	793.59	
1971/2		294.95
1978/9		36.97

By 1965 the power station (as stated in a CEGB advertisement) employed around 500 people and could produce enough electricity to supply the area of Farnworth and much of Bolton recorded at 272,000 kilowatts of electricity. During 1965 the original 'A' station boilers were converted from coal burning to heavy oil firing. Each of the six boilers needed to run the turbines at full load consumed 5,500 gallons of oil per hour. In 1971 the boilers had a combined steam generating capacity of 3.2 million pounds per hour (403.2 kg/s). The steam conditions were 300/600 psi (20.7/41.4 bar) and 375/427 °C. The 'A' Station was mothballed after the Arab-Israeli conflict of the early 1970s that resulted in a huge increase in oil prices. In 1979 experiments were carried out at the station in burning the town of Bolton's refuse to produce electricity. This was not the first occasion that the station had burned such refuse, in 1962 tobacco offal, battery cases, bathroom fittings and oil saturated clay were burnt as fuel additives in an experiment to establish their calorific value.

The station closed on 27 October 1980. By this time its generating capacity had been lowered to only 96 MW.
