= Warrington power station =

Former coal-fired power station

- Country: England
- Location: Warrington
- Coordinates: 53°23′08″N 02°35′10″W
- Status: Decommissioned and demolished
- Commission date: 1900
- Decommission date: 1979
- Owners: Warrington and District Electric Light and Power Company Limited (1900–1948); British Electricity Authority (1948–1955); Central Electricity Authority (1955–1957); Central Electricity Generating Board (1958–1979)
- Operator: As owner

Thermal power station
- Primary fuel: Coal
- Turbine technology: Steam turbines
- Cooling source: River water

Power generation
- Units operational: 3 x 20 MW, 1 x 30 MW
- Make and model: English Electric, Brush Ljungstrom
- Annual net output: 161,474 MWh (1946)

Warrington power station supplied electricity to the town of Warrington, Lancashire (now Cheshire) and the surrounding area from about 1900 to 1979. The power station was initially developed by the Warrington and District Electric Light and Power Company Limited, this was taken over by Warrington Corporation, which operated the power station prior to the nationalisation of the British electricity supply industry in 1948. It was redeveloped several times to meet the increased demand for electricity.

== History ==
Warrington and District Electric Light and Power Company Limited was registered in January 1898 to generate and supply electricity to Warrington. A provisional order under the Electric Lighting Acts, the Warrington Electric Lighting Order 1898, was granted by the Board of Trade and was confirmed by Parliament through the Electric Lighting Orders Confirmation (No. 11) Act 1898 (61 & 62 Vict. c. xciv). The power station was built in Howley, Warrington (53°23′08″N 2°35′10″W). Equipment was added to meet the rising demand for electricity; by 1922 it had a generating capacity of 7,750 kW.

From the establishment of the Warrington Corporation Tramways in 1902 the power station supplied electric current to tram system. The trams were decommissioned in 1935.

Warrington power station became a selected station in the North West England and North Wales Electricity Scheme. It was part of one of three national grid rings in the northwest. Other stations on the Warrington ring were Ribble (Preston), Southport, Lister Drive (Liverpool) and Westwood (Wigan).

New plant was installed and the output of the power station was uprated in 1940, 1944, 1946 and 1952.

The British electricity supply industry was nationalised in 1948 under the provisions of the Electricity Act 1947 (10 & 11 Geo. 6. c. 54). The Warrington electricity undertaking was abolished, ownership of Warrington power station was vested in the British Electricity Authority, and subsequently the Central Electricity Authority and the Central Electricity Generating Board (CEGB). At the same time the electricity distribution and sales responsibilities of the Warrington electricity undertaking were transferred to the North Western Electricity Board (NORWEB).

Warrington power station was closed on 29 October 1979.

== Equipment specification ==
By 1923 the plant comprised boilers delivering 193,000 lb/h (24.3 kg/s) of steam to:

- 1 × 1,000 kW steam turbo-alternator AC
- 1 × 2,000 kW steam turbo-alternator AC
- 1 × 3,000 kW steam turbo-alternator AC
- 2 × 250 kW reciprocating engines with DC generator
- 1 × 500 kW reciprocating engine with DC generator
- 1 × 750 kW reciprocating engine with DC generator

These machines gave a total generating capacity of 7,750 kW comprising 6,000 kW of alternating current (AC) plus 1,750 kW of direct current (DC).

The following electricity supplies were available to consumers:

- 440 & 380 Volts, 3-phase, 50 Hz AC
- 250 & 220 Volts, 3-phase, 50 Hz AC
- 460 & 230 Volts DC

=== Plant in 1940–52 ===
In 1940 the old plant had a capacity of 12 MW; new plant with a generating capacity of 20 MW was installed. This was followed by extensions of 20 MW (1944), 20 MW (1946) and 30 MW (1952). The old plant was decommissioned in March 1949.

By 1954 the plant comprised:

- Boilers:
  - 5 × Simon Carves 200,000 lb/h (25.2 kg/s) boilers, steam conditions were 425 psi and 825 °F (29.3 bar and 441 °C), steam was supplied to:
- Generators:
  - 3 × 20 MW English Electric turbo-alternator (commissioned 1940, 1944 and 1946)
  - 1 × 30 MW Brush Ljungstrom (commissioned December 1952)

The total generating capacity was 90 MW at 6.6 kV.

Condenser cooling water was drawn from the adjacent River Mersey.

== Operations ==
=== Operating data 1921–23 ===
The electricity supply data for the period 1921–23 was:

Warrington power station supply data 1921–23

Electricity Use	Units	Year		
Electricity Use	Units	1921	1922	1923
Lighting and domestic	MWh	730	858	1,055
Public lighting	MWh	73	86	86
Traction	MWh	656	632	624
Power	MWh	8,877	7,075	10,232
Bulk supply	MWh	0	0	0
Total use	MWh	10,337	8,652	12,048

Electricity Loads on the system were:

Year		1921	1922	1923
Maximum load	kW	5,365	5,413	5,870
Total connections	kW	11,538	12,247	13,227
Load factor	Per cent	27.0	22.6	28.4

Revenue from the sale of current (in 1923) was £92,474; the surplus of revenue over expenses was £51,584.

=== Operating data 1946 ===
In 1946 Warrington power station supplied 161,474 MWh of electricity; the maximum output load was 60,258 kW. The load factor was 31.4%, and the thermal efficiency was 20.88%.

=== Operating data 1954–78 ===
Operating data for the period 1954–78 was:

Warrington power station operating data, 1954–78
Year	Running hours or load factor (per cent)	Max output capacity MW	Electricity supplied MWh	Thermal efficiency per cent
1954	6882	85	300,848	22.27
1955	5952	85	264,621	21.53
1956	6181	85	226,672	21.52
1957	7654	85	259,375	21.81
1958	7633	85	244,544	22.04
1961	26.0 %	86	196,103	21.04
1962	24.3 %	86	183,239	21.26
1963	25.24 %	86	190,170	21.00
1967	31.0 %	86	233,265	21.18
1972	14.4 %	86	108,658	19.27
1978	0.7 %	51	3.06	10.42

== Warrington Electricity District ==
Following nationalisation in 1948 Warrington power station became part of the Warrington electricity supply district, covering 51 square miles (132 km^{2}) with a population of 127,000 in 1958. The number of consumers and electricity sold in the Warrington district was:

Year	1957	1958
Number of consumers	40,586	41,689
Electricity sold MWh	373,176	377,404

In 1958 the number of units sold to categories of consumers was:

Type of consumer	No. of consumers	Electricity sold MWh
Domestic	37,864	58,551
Shops and Offices	2,773	49,088
Factories	663	266,133
Farms	385	2,155
Public lighting	4	1477
Total	41,689	377,404

The maximum demand was 86,680 kW, the load factor was 49.7%.

== See also ==
- Timeline of the UK electricity supply industry
- List of power stations in England
