= Westwood Power Station =

Coal-fired power station in Greater Manchester

- Country: England
- Location: Greater Manchester, North West England
- Coordinates: 53°32′18″N 2°37′40″W
- Status: Decommissioned and demolished
- Construction began: 1948
- Commission date: 1950
- Decommission date: 1989
- Operators: British Electricity Authority (1948–1955); Central Electricity Authority (1955–1957); Central Electricity Generating Board (1958–1989)

Thermal power station
- Primary fuel: Coal
- Turbine technology: Steam turbine
- Chimneys: 2
- Cooling towers: 2
- Cooling source: River water

Power generation
- Units decommissioned: All

Westwood Power Station was a coal-fired power station situated adjacent to the Leeds and Liverpool Canal in Ince-in-Makerfield in Greater Manchester, North West England.

== History ==
The station was constructed in 1948–50 by the British Electricity Authority. It used two 314 feet (96 m) tall cooling towers to cool its water.

The boiler plant comprised five Babcock & Wilcox pulverised fuel fired boilers capable of delivering 1,425,000 lb/h (180.0 kg/s) of steam at 660 psi (45.5 bar) and 393 °C.

Following the construction of the national grid in 1928-33 Westwood power station was connected to an electricity grid ring which included the power stations at Southport, Lister Drive (Liverpool), Warrington and Ribble (Preston); this was one of three electricity rings in the North West.

The generating capacity of the station was 128 MW comprising four uprated British Thomson-Houston 32 MW turbo-alternators. The first generating set was commissioned in September 1951 followed by the other sets in December 1951, September 1952, and December 1953.

Steam condensing and cooling was by two Mitchell reinforced concrete hyperbolic cooling towers, each tower had a capacity of 3 million gallons per hour (3.79 m^{3}/s).

The generating capacity and output from Westwood power station is given in the following graph and table.

Westwood power station electricity output, GWh

Westwood electricity capacity and output
Year	1954	1955	1956	1957	1958	1961	1962	1963	1972	1979	1982
Installed capacity, MW	112	112	112	112	112	128	128	128	128	128	128
Electricity output, GWh	58.08	631.32	605.82	457.36	544.62	543.495	583.181	609.853	217.35	280.33	185.97

In the year ending 31 March 1972 the station's load factor (the average load as a per cent of maximum output capacity) was 20.6 per cent.

The station was demolished in 1989, the cooling towers were demolished on 15 January 1989.

== Today ==
The former power station site has been developed into Westwood business park with over 610,000 square feet (57,000 m^{2}) of office space. Another part of the site had been redeveloped into a Girobank office from the early 1990s until it was demolished in 2015 to make way for a 400,000 sqft Nice-Pak wet-wipe factory.
