= Radcliffe Power Station =

Former coal-fired power station

- Country: England, United Kingdom
- Location: Radcliffe, Greater Manchester, North West England
- Coordinates: 53.553529°N 2.339519°W
- Status: Demolished
- Commission date: 1905
- Decommission date: 1959
- Operator: Lancashire Electric Power Company

Thermal power station
- Primary fuel: Coal

Power generation
- Nameplate capacity: 42,375kW

Radcliffe Power Station was a coal-fired power station in Radcliffe, Greater Manchester, England.

== History ==
The station was opened on 9 October 1905 by the Earl of Derby. It contained six 20,000 lb/hr Babcock & Wilcox boilers supplying steam to four Curtis 2,000 kW 10,000 Volt turbo generating sets made by British Thomson-Houston. Radcliffe Power Station was the first power station in the UK to transmit power by bare electrical conductors at 10kV. The station was fed coal by the nearby East Lancashire Railway line.

The station was progressively expanded, reaching a combined capacity of 42,375 kW following the installation of two extra 10,000 kW British Thomson-Houston generating sets in 1922.

In May 1926, The Times reported that the cost of generation per unit of electricity was .25d (approximately £0.001 today), the cost per unit sold being 0.483d (approximately £0.002). The station had delivered 125,727,060 units of electricity.

The station was originally operated by the Lancashire Electric Power Company but was operated by the British Electricity Authority, Central Electricity Authority and Central Electricity Generating Board after nationalisation in 1947. It was closed a few years later in 1959.
