= Padiham Power Station =

Coal-fired power station in Lancashire, England

- Padiham B in the 1980s
- Country: England
- Location: Lancashire, North West England
- Coordinates: 53.795488°N 2.327372°W
- Construction began: 1924 (Padiham A); 1957 (Padiham B)
- Commission date: 1926 (Padiham A); 1962 (Padiham B)
- Decommission date: 1969 (Padiham A); 1993 (Padiham B)
- Operator: Lancashire Electric Power Company

Thermal power station
- Primary fuel: Coal

Padiham Power Station was a coal-fired power station in Padiham, east Lancashire, England, which began operation in 1926 and generated power from 1927 until it was closed in 1993.

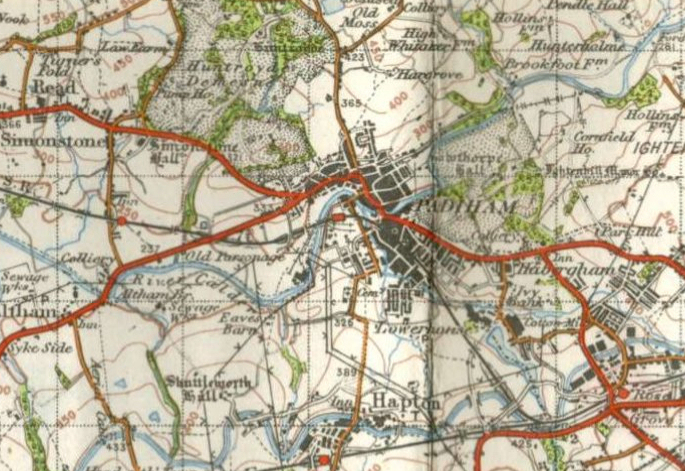
1948 Ordnance Survey map showing power lines heading south-east and then due south from the power station located on the north-west bank of the river Calder.

== Location ==
The plant was located on the north bank of the River Calder just west of the town. It was also known as Hapton or Simonstone Power Station being close to all of the villages. Since the station closed, the site has been used for a modern business park, Shuttleworth Mead.

== History ==
=== Padiham A ===
The Lancashire Electric Power Company's proposal to build a coal-fired plant at Padiham (known as Padiham 'A') was approved in 1924 for a 12,000 kW station. By March 1925 two 6,000 kW alternator sets had been ordered, the sidings for delivery of coal by rail completed and work commenced on foundations. It was the second of three stations built by the company.

The Electricity (Supply) Act 1926 (16 & 17 Geo. 5. c. 51) established the Central Electricity Board to control the best and most efficient stations and set up a grid, standardise frequencies, supply local authorities and supply rural districts. The Padiham buildings had been roofed, alternators tested, installation begun, boilers erected, a weir across the River Calder completed, two cooling towers and the coal and ash plant nearly complete. Test were underway by July and on 24 January 1927 the plant was brought into regular use.

An 11,000 volt line had been installed to the power stations at Accrington and Radcliffe. A further 12,500 kW alternator was ordered and eventually installed by 1929. The two British Thomson-Houston sets were later rated at 7,500 and 15,625 kW. The turbines were supplied with steam from six 35,000 lb/hr and two 56,000 lb/hr boilers operating at 250 psi and 650 °F. By 1940 Padiham was supplying loads at Padiham (7,600 kW), Nelson and Colne (20,500 kW) and Burnley (20,500 kW). Two more 12,500 kW alternators were ordered. 70 million units per year at 20% load factor were being generated and in 1942/3 two more boilers were being installed.

The Electricity Act 1947 nationalised the electricity industry and set up the British Electricity Authority (BEA), which became the Central Electricity Authority (CEA) in 1955, controlled by the Minister of Fuel and Power. The Authority took over electricity generating function of the Lancashire Electric Power (LEP) Company and promoted efficient generation, transmission and distribution and cheaper prices in rural areas. It also standardised the system and electrical fittings and had 11 divisions and 12 area boards. Padiham power station was vested in the BEA and the LEP's electricity distribution and sales functions were taken over by the North Western Electricity Board (NWEB). The CEA was in turn dissolved by the Electricity Act 1957 and replaced by the Central Electricity Generating Board (CEGB) and the Electricity Council.

The generating capacity and output from Padiham A is given in the following table.

Padiham A electricity capacity and output
Year	1946	1954	1955	1956	1957	1958	1962	1963	1967
Installed capacity, MW		28	28	28	28	28	31.375	31.375	31.375
Electricity output, GWh	89.33	36.877	34.084	20.063	21.887	14.774	5.568	17.150	17.609

Padiham A power station closed in 1969.

=== Padiham B ===
In 1957 a 240 MW station, Padiham "B", was authorised with the first British Thomson-Houston unit of 120 MW commissioned in 1962. There were two Babcock & Wilcox boilers rated at 108 kg/s, steam conditions were 103.42 bar at 538 °C, with reheat to 538 °C. Padiham B was one of the CEGB’s twenty steam power stations with the highest thermal efficiency; in 1963–4 the thermal efficiency was 32.36 per cent, 32.91 per cent in 1964–5, and 33.27 per cent in 1965–6. The annual electricity output of Padiham B was:

Electricity output of Padiham B
Year	1960–61	1961–2	1962–3	1963–4	1964–5	1965–6	1966-7	1971–2	1978–9	1981–2
Electricity supplied, GWh	7.546	15.400	336.589	379	637	1,147	915.685	622	790.48	542
Thermal efficiency, %	16.28	29.64	30.74	32.36	32.91	33.27	32.44	31.09	31.45	32.43

In 1964 a Padiham "C" was proposed but not built. Padiham "A" closed in 1969. In 1971 some oil firing and orimulsion was proposed at one stage but it seems only coal and petrocoke were ever used. By 1984 the station was generating 15 million MW hours.

In 1993 the last load of coal was delivered and Padiham "B" ceased generation on 31 March.

The power station is also notable for being used in a minor capacity during the filming of science fiction comedy series Red Dwarf in the 1990s

== Redevelopment ==
Although the rail line had closed for passengers connecting Padiham railway station to Burnley and Blackburn in 1957, the section to the power station was retained for coal deliveries. Part of it was under consideration by Lancashire County Council as a rural walk in 2008. The weir constructed to provide cooling water for the plant was also under consideration for partial removal to provide a canoe slalom and aid fish, salmon and trout, trying to reach the upper part of the river. The Environment Agency believes that the quality of the Calder is now of a standard that can support these fish. The project is a joint fish pass and canoe run. Fish movement upstream will open up opportunities for course and game fishing in the rural areas up stream. The works to remove the derelict weir will see the final stage of the reclamation of the former power station and the work is complementary to the county’s developing land reclamation programme.

== See also ==
- Timeline of the UK electricity supply industry
- List of power stations in England
- List of pre-nationalisation UK electric power companies
- National Grid (UK)
- Huncoat and Whitebirk, other stations on the Burnley Coalfield
