= London and Home Counties Joint Electricity Authority =

- Company type: Statutory body
- Industry: Electricity supply
- Founded: 1925
- Defunct: 31 March 1948
- Fate: Nationalisation
- Successor: Various electricity boards and the British Electricity Authority
- Headquarters: London, United Kingdom
- Area served: London and home counties
- Key people: see text
- Services: Generation and supply of electricity

The London and Home Counties Joint Electricity Authority was a United Kingdom statutory body established in 1925 with the responsibility to "provide or secure the provision of a cheap and abundant supply of electricity” within the County of London and parts of the surrounding home counties. The Authority acquired electricity in bulk from electricity undertakings for distribution, and operated some power stations in Surrey. The Authority was abolished upon nationalisation of the British electricity industry in 1948.

== Establishment ==
The Electricity (Supply) Act 1919 (9 & 10 Geo. 5. c. 100) had established the Electricity Commissioners with the aim to consider schemes for the centralisation of electricity supplies in a small number of large generating stations owned by joint electricity authorities (JEA). The London and Home Counties JEA was established in 1925 under the provisions of the 1919 act and the Electricity (Supply) Act 1922 (12 & 13 Geo. 5. c. 46). Its role was to ensure the provision of a cheap and abundant supply of electricity in London and the home counties.

== Constitution ==
The London and Home Counties JEA formally comprised 36 members as follows:

- Local authority electricity undertakings (in County of London): 8
- Local authority electricity undertakings (outside county): 5
- West Ham Corporation: 1
- The ten electricity companies, see below: 1
- The four electricity companies, see below: 1
- Other electricity companies (Kent, North Metropolitan, etc): 1
- Other electricity companies: 2
- London County Council: 6
- Middlesex County Council: 1
- Other County Councils: 2
- Corporation of London: 1
- Workers in the industry: 2
- Railway companies: 2
- Former electricity supply authorities: 3

London Electricity (No. 1) Act 1925
- Act of Parliament
- Parliament of the United Kingdom
- Long title: An Act to make further and better provision with respect to the supply of electricity in the administrative county of London to confer further powers upon certain of the companies supplying electricity within the said county and for other purposes.
- Citation: 14 & 15 Geo. 5. c. lxii

Dates
- Royal assent: 31 July 1925

Other legislation
- Amended by: Electricity (Supply) Act 1926; County of London Electric Supply Company's Act 1927

Status: Amended

Text of statute as originally enacted

London Electricity (No. 2) Act 1925
- Act of Parliament
- Parliament of the United Kingdom
- Long title: An Act to make further provision with respect to the supply of electricity in London and for other purposes.
- Citation: 14 & 15 Geo. 5. c. lxiii

Dates
- Royal assent: 31 July 1925

Other legislation
- Amended by: Electricity (Supply) Act 1926

Status: Amended

Text of statute as originally enacted

Ten electricity companies, mainly in West London, had amalgamated in 1925 in the London Power Company, under the provisions of the London Electricity (No. 2) Act 1925 (14 & 15 Geo. 5. c. lxiii) Similarly in East London four companies had amalgamated under the London Electricity (No. 1) Act 1925 (14 & 15 Geo. 5. c. lxii).

The London JEA appointed a chairman and vice-chairman from its members. The first chairman of the JEA was Sir George Hume (1925 to 1926), and the first vice-chairman was Clement Attlee. Later chairmen were Sir Duncan Watson (from 1926), William Francis Marchant (in 1931 and 1933), Alderman B. J. Samels (1933), James Chuter Ede (1934 to 1940), Alderman Dudley Stuart (from 1940), and H. E. Goodrich (1947). In October 1934 Molly Bolton was the first woman to be one of the London County Council's six representatives on the LHCJEA. The joint electricity authority’s headquarters was originally at 5 Millbank, London, SW1, from 1936 it was at 5-6 Lancaster Place, Strand, London WC2.

== District ==
The London JEA supply district covered 1,841 square miles including the whole of the counties of London and Middlesex, and parts of Hertfordshire, Essex, Kent, Surrey, Buckinghamshire, and Berkshire. The district extended from Eton in the west to Billericay in the east and from Dorking in the south to Welwyn in the north. The population served by the authority in 1931 was 9,088,764.

== Operations ==
The JEA's powers to purchase land and construct generating stations were extended by the London and Home Counties Joint Electricity Authority Act 1927 (17 & 18 Geo. 5. c. cix).

The amount of electricity sold by undertakings agreed to be purchased by the JEA was:

Electricity sales
Year	Electricity MWh
1925	8,948
1926	10,222
1927	11,351
1928	12,869
1929	14,385

In 1932 there were 83 authorised undertakers in the district comprising the JEA itself, 44 local authority and 38 companies.

Companies in the London area were required to notify the JEA of any proposal to spend any capital exceeding £5,000 on assets

The London JEA intended to build a large power station at Chiswick, however the Central Electricity Board rejected the scheme and instead proposed the expansion of Fulham power station which was nearer to the centre of load.

By 1932 the London JEA had acquired the following undertakings: Callender's (Surbiton), Edmundson's (Dorking), Leatherhead and District, South Metropolitan Tramways, Twickenham and Teddington, and Urban (Weybridge).

In 1937 the London JEA sold 395,195 MWh of electricity, revenue from these sales was £1,357,974. Costs were £1,149,252 making a surplus of £208,720.

The London JEA was empowered to purchase the assets of any electricity company in its area in 1971.

In the year ending 31 December 1947, the last full year of its operation, the London Joint Electricity Authority generated 0 MWh, purchased 989,914 MWh and sold 955,285 MWh with a value of £4,107,983 to 144,531 consumers. The gross operating surplus was £320,524.

== Abolition ==
The London JEA was abolished in 1948 under the provisions of the Electricity Act 1947 which nationalised British electricity industry. The JEA’s assets were split between the South Eastern Electricity Board, the Eastern Electricity Board and the London Electricity Board.

== See also ==
- West Midlands Joint Electricity Authority
- North West Midlands Joint Electricity Authority
- North Wales and South Cheshire Joint Electricity Authority
- List of pre-nationalisation UK electric power companies
- Joint electricity authority
