= British Power and Light Corporation =

- Company type: Public Company
- Industry: Electricity supply
- Founded: 7 May 1929
- Defunct: 31 March 1948
- Fate: Nationalisation
- Successor: British Electricity Authority
- Headquarters: London, United Kingdom
- Area served: North Wales; East Suffolk; South Somerset; Trent Valley and High Peak; West Hampshire; and Ringwood
- Key people: See text
- Services: Electricity supply
- Revenue: See tables

The British Power and Light Corporation Limited, also known as the British Power & Light Corporation (1929) Limited was registered in 1929 to acquire a controlling interest in electricity undertakings in North Wales; East Suffolk; South Somerset; Trent Valley and High Peak; West Hampshire; and Ringwood, Hampshire. The corporation operated for 19 years and was abolished upon the nationalisation of the British electricity supply industry in 1948.

== Background ==
The British Power and Light Corporation Limited was registered on 7 May 1929 as a holding company by a group of British merchant bankers to assume control of, and develop, a number of electricity undertakings in England and Wales.

The inaugural board of directors were:

- Henry Augustus Vernet
- Edward de Stein
- Constatine Evelyn Benson
- Gerald William Partridge
- George Victor Twiss (managing director)

The company's registered office was 27 Old Broad Street, London EC2.

After establishment the British Power and Light Corporation acquired a controlling interest in two companies:

- The North Wales Power Company Limited
- Electricity Distribution of North Wales and District Limited

In addition, it acquired the whole of the share capital of five electricity undertakings:

- East Suffolk Electricity Distribution Co. Ltd. (Orford undertaking)
- South Somerset and District Electricity Co. Ltd.
- Trent Valley and High Peak Electricity Co. Ltd. (Chapel-en-le-Frith and Rugeley undertakings)
- West Hampshire Electricity Co. Ltd.
- Ringwood Electric Supply Co. Ltd.

The British Power and Light Corporation was one of a number of electricity holding companies that had a wide and disparate geographical range of interests. Other such companies included: Christy Bros. and Company Limited; Edmundsons Electricity Corporation; Electrical Finance and Securities Company Limited; Midland Counties Electric Supply Company Limited.

== North Wales companies ==
The North Wales Power Company had increased its sales and revenue during the 1920s:

Year	Electricity sold, Gwh	Revenue£,
1921	7	29,263
1922	8	34,726
1923	12	59,247
1924	14	71,771
1925	19	87,787
1926	30	145,801
1927	38	168,770
1928	42	180,416

However, the company's profits had not been commensurate with its capital because of a shortage of generating plant (only 5.5 MW). This meant that electricity had to be purchased.

The North Wales Power Company owned three hydro-electric power stations:

- Cwm Dyli, commissioned in 1906, output 5 MW,
- Dolgarrog, No.1 station commissioned in 1909 and No.2 station in 1925, total output 17.6 MW,
- Maentwrog, commissioned in 1928, output 24 MW.

To raise capital from its inception the British Power and Light Corporation offered 1,600,000 shares of £1 each on the Stock Exchange in May 1929.

The gross revenue of the North Wales company from the sale of electricity rose steadily during the 1930s, as shown:

North Wales company electricity sales and revenue 1932-37
Year	Sales to consumers		Sales to CEB (note)		Sales to Distribution Co	
Year	Electricity, MWh	Revenue	Electricity, MWh	Revenue	Electricity, MWh	Revenue
1932	65,486	£247,717	Nil	Nil	10,219	£154,186
1933	73,563	£274,171	Nil	Nil	14,017	£190,284
1934	85,462	£304,372	29,501	£92,083	17,155	£227,371
1935	97,765	£336,072	47,765	£119,126	21,782	£276,199
1936	107,550	£365,302	41,852	£118,648	26,523	£336,946
1937	118,467	£397,245	39,770	£121,137	33,475	£393,521

Note: The Central Electricity Board (CEB) was established in 1926 to construct the National Grid and to control and purchase electricity from selected power stations.

== Operations 1937 ==
A summary and breakdown of the operating and financial data in 1937 for the constituent companies is shown on the table.

British Power and Light Corporation constituent company operations 1937
	North Wales	North Wales Distribution	East Suffolk	South Somerset	Trent Valley & High Peak	West Hampshire	Ringwood
Generating capacity, MW	52.2	Nil	Nil	Nil	Nil	Nil	0.145
Electricity generated, MWh	36,789	0	0	0	0	0	356.1
Electricity purchased, MWh	108,376	19,248	2,422	5,085	5,699	5,134	1,042
Electricity sold, MWh	127,844	16,796	2,153	4,504	5,243	4,415	1,277
Electricity sold, £	408,853	195,441	24,693	40,930	40,056	49,026	11,703
No. of consumers	3,435	39,741	3,601	4,911	5,957	7,071	1,552
Connections on system, kW	73,724	50,104	4,871	8,114	10,923	7,633	1,923
Gross surplus, £	261,388	70,869	14,890	18,987	21,818	25,866	5,507

To raise further capital, in December 1938 the British Power and Light Corporation offered £4 million of shares on the stock exchange.

The board of directors in 1938 were:

- Edward de Stein
- Constatine Evelyn Benson (chairman)
- Gerald William Partridge
- Reginald Francis Legge
- Robert Stuart Hilton
- George Wansbrough

The registered office was Artillery House, Artillery Row, Westminster, London SW1.

== Operations 1947 ==
In its last full year of operation (1947) a summary and breakdown of the operating and financial data for the constituent companies is shown on the table.

British Power and Light Corporation constituent company operations 1947
	North Wales	North Wales Distribution	East Suffolk	South Somerset	Trent Valley & High Peak	West Hampshire	Ringwood
Electricity generated, MWh	51,875	Nil	Nil	Nil	Nil	Nil	166
Electricity purchased, MWh	309,048	57,240	11,880	18,378	19,758	219,240	7,633
Electricity sold, MWh	336,601	49,871	9,596	16058	17,992	201,800	7,599
Electricity sold, £	1,201,026	458,519	68,602	123,824	119,058	915,044	41,227
Gross surplus, £	368,209	181,863	19,061	38,941	43,972	168,134	8,435

== Abolition ==
The British Power and Light Corporation and all its constituent companies were abolished on 31 March 1948 when the British electricity industry was nationalised. The generating plant and transmission systems devolved to the British Electricity Authority and the distribution systems to the appropriate geographical electricity board, for example the Merseyside and North Wales Electricity Board, the Southern Electricity Board, the Eastern Electricity Board.

The company was one of five electricity undertakings that operated over large geographical areas. Its assets were divided between two or more area electricity boards. The five companies were:

- British Power and Light Corporation
- Christy Brothers and Company Limited
- Edmundsons Electricity Corporation
- Electrical Finance and Securities Company
- Midland Counties Electric Supply Company, see Midland Electric Light and Power Company

== See also ==
- North Wales and South Cheshire Joint Electricity Authority
- List of pre-nationalisation UK electric power companies
