= Joint electricity authority =

Statutory bodies established in the United Kingdom

Joint electricity authorities (JEAs) were statutory bodies established in the United Kingdom in the 1920s which aimed to provide a low-cost and abundant supply of electricity to consumers. This was to be achieved by constructing and operating power stations, and electricity transmission and distribution systems on a coordinated basis in regional Electricity Districts overseen by the joint electricity authorities.

== Background ==
The Electricity (Supply) Act 1919 (9 & 10 Geo. 5. c. 100) established the statutory body of the Electricity Commissioners 'to promote, regulate and supervise the supply of electricity' under the direction of the Board of Trade. The act provided for the commissioners to constitute Electricity Districts and, where appropriate, to establish joint electricity authorities (JEAs), 'to provide or secure the provision of a cheap and abundant supply of electricity', with the agreement of the electricity undertakings concerned. The aim of the joint authorities was to produce electricity more economically by inter-connecting power stations and transmission systems on a regional basis. The Joint Authority would acquire all the power stations in the area and build large, efficient and economic super-stations.

The Electricity Commissioners had started work in January 1920 and had identified electricity districts across the country.

== Electricity districts ==
Fifteen electricity districts were identified.

- East of Scotland Electricity District
- Edinburgh and Lothians Electricity District
- London and Home Counties Electricity District
- Lower Severn Electricity District
- Mersey and West Lancashire Electricity District
- Mid Lancashire Electricity District
- North East Midlands Electricity District
- North Lancashire and South Cumberland Electricity District
- North Wales and Chester Electricity District
- North West Midlands Electricity District
- South East Lancashire Electricity District
- South Wales Electricity District
- South West Midlands Electricity District
- West of Scotland Electricity District
- West Riding (Aire & Calder) Electricity District

== Joint electricity authorities issues ==
The establishment of JEAs was slow and problematic. JEAs were set up on a voluntary basis, and they were largely supported by local authority electricity undertakings. But power companies thought that the JEAs would take over their functions and therefore opposed their establishment.

The Electricity (Supply) Act 1922 (12 & 13 Geo. 5. c. 46) amended the law on the supply of electricity. It established the powers of JEAs to borrow money for the construction and operation of electricity generating and transmission systems and protected the interests of the power companies.

The Electricity (Supply) Act 1926 (16 & 17 Geo. 5. c. 51) established the Central Electricity Board to coordinate the supply of electricity across the country and to construct the national grid.

== The authorities ==
In the event only four joint authorities were established:

=== North Wales and South Cheshire Joint Electricity Authority ===
The North Wales and South Cheshire Joint Electricity Authority was the first JEA to be formed in August 1923. The JEA transferred some powers, rights and obligations to the North Wales Power Company, this included all rights of distribution of electricity in the area. From this time the JEA was effectively the North Wales Power Company. The power company developed several hydro-power stations and extended transmission lines to towns and industrial areas. The power company, under the supervision of the Joint Electricity Authority, controlled generation and transmission and supplied electricity to local undertakings in the area with the exception of Chester. Upon abolition in 1948 the joint electricity authority’s generating plant and transmission systems were devolved to the British Electricity Authority and the distribution systems to the Merseyside and North Wales Electricity Board (MANWEB).

=== London and Home Counties Joint Electricity Authority ===
The London and Home Counties Joint Electricity Authority was established in 1925 to "provide or secure the provision of a cheap and abundant supply of electricity within the district". The district covered 1,841 square miles including the whole of the counties of London and Middlesex, and parts of Hertfordshire, Essex, Kent, Surrey, Buckinghamshire, and Berkshire. Upon abolition in 1948 the JEA’s generating assets devolved to the British Electricity Authority and the distribution and sales functions split between the South Eastern Electricity Board, the Eastern Electricity Board and the London Electricity Board.

=== West Midlands Joint Electricity Authority ===
The West Midlands Joint Electricity Authority was established in 1925 by the West Midlands Electricity District Order 1925 made under the Electricity (Supply) Act 1919. It covered an area of about 1,000 square miles, including much of Shropshire, Staffordshire and Worcestershire. The JEA included representatives of Midland Electricity Corporation; Wolverhampton, Walsall, West Bromwich, Cannock and Shrewsbury councils; colliery owners; railway companies; and electricity industry workers. In 1928 it acquired four power stations: Ocker Hill formerly operated by the Midland Electric Corporation for Power Distribution; the 30 MW Wolverhampton power station; the 28 MW Walsall Birchills power station; and the 6.65 MW West Bromwich station. The joint electricity authority built the 200 MW Ironbridge A power station (1932). The JEA's stations were linked through a system operating at 33 kV. On 1 October 1938 the JEA took over Shrewsbury power station. The JEA's principal office was at Phoenix Buildings, Dudley Road, Wolverhampton. Upon abolition in 1948 the JEA's assets were transferred to the Midlands Electricity Board and the British Electricity Authority.

=== North West Midlands Joint Electricity Authority ===
The North West Midlands Joint Electricity Authority]was established by the North West Midlands Electricity District Order 1928. It covered an area of 800 square miles of Staffordshire, Shropshire and Cheshire including Stoke-on-Trent. It acquired the Stoke-on-Trent and Stafford power stations on 1 April 1930. Thereafter Stoke Corporation and Stafford Corporation purchased electricity in bulk from the JEA. It was based in York Chambers, Kingsway, Stoke-on-Trent. The joint electricity authority built the 120 MW Meaford A power station first commissioned in 1947. Upon abolition in 1948 the JEA’s supply assets were transferred to the Midlands Electricity Board, with generating assets going to the British Electricity Authority.

== Abolition ==
As described above, joint electricity authorities were abolished on 31 March 1948 under the provisions of the Electricity Act 1947 (10 & 11 Geo. 6. c. 54). With nationalisation effective from 1 April 1948 the generating and transmission assets of the JEAs were transferred to the British Electricity Authority. The electricity distribution and sales functions devolved to one or more of the new regional electricity boards.

== See also ==
- List of pre-nationalisation UK electric power companies
