= Christy Brothers and Company Limited =

UK electrical engineering company

- Company type: Public company
- Industry: Electricity supply
- Founded: 1883
- Founder: Frank Christy
- Defunct: 31 March 1948
- Fate: Nationalisation
- Headquarters: Chelmsford Essex, England
- Area served: North Somerset, West Devon, Culm Valley, Bude, Burnham, Aldeburgh, Holsworthy, Mid Somerset
- Key people: Christy family
- Services: Electricity supply
- Operating income: £239,069 (1932)
- Net income: £29,755 (1932)
- Number of employees: 500 (1932)
- Subsidiaries: See text

Christy Brothers and Company Limited was a UK electricity engineering company which provided equipment, staffing and management to a number of electricity undertakings, worked as subsidiary companies, in Cornwall, Devon, Somerset and Suffolk.

== Background ==
Christy Brothers was founded in 1883 as an electrical engineering and contracting firm. The company started to provide electric lighting of towns and villages from about 1900. It acquired a controlling interest in eight electric power companies.

The constituent companies:

- North Somerset Electric Supply Company Limited, originally founded as the Clevedon and District Electric Supply Company Limited on 29 September 1911, changed its name to the Clevedon Portishead and District Electric Supply Company Limited.
- West Devon Electric Supply Company Limited was registered on 23 December 1931, and formed to acquire and take over the various small undertakings in West Devon. Shares were offered to the value of £250,000 in November 1933.
- Culm Valley Electric Supply Company Limited (Devon).
- Bude Electric Supply Company Limited, registered 7 October 1907, formed to adopt an agreement with Christy Brothers to carry on the business of electricity supplier in Bude, Cornwall.
- Burnham and District Electric Supply Company Limited, registered 17 July 1913, formed to carry on the business of electricity supplier around Burnham, Somerset.
- Aldeburgh Electric Supply Company Limited, registered 18 July 1911, formed to carry on the business of electricity supplier, Electric Lighting Order 1911 transferred supply responsibilities to Christy Brothers in Aldeburgh, Suffolk.
- Holsworthy Gas and Electric Supply Company Limited, registered 11 February 1910 to assume responsibility from the Holsworthy Gas company and for electricity from W.H. Harkell of Holsworthy, Devon.
- Mid Somerset Electric Supply Company Limited

== Operations ==
The generating capacity of the plant at each company was as follows.

Generating capacity 1937
Company	Generating plant kW
North Somerset	None
West Devon	3 × 225 water, 2 × 500 oil, 3 × 650 water 2 × 350 water, 1 × 75 oil, 1 × 100 oil
Culm Valley	1 × 12 water, 1 × 18 water
Bude	1 × 170 oil, 2 × 150 oil
Burnham	None
Aldeburgh	2 × 100 oil
Holsworthy	None
Mid Somerset	None

Note: oil is oil-fired plant, water is water powered (hydro-electric)

The principal operating parameters of the constituent companies in 1937 is shown in the table.

Electricity supply 1937
Company	Electricity MWh			Connections kW	No. of Consumers
Company	Generated	Purchased	Sold	Connections kW	No. of Consumers
North Somerset	0	34,207	29,586	-	20,835
West Devon	5,305	132	4,625	10,778	4,801
Culm Valley	175	1,481	1,403	3,108	1,967
Bude	132	919	858	2,863	1,358
Burnham	0	1,197	1,043	-	1,236
Aldeburgh	200	308	348	1,486	615
Holsworthy	0	237	227	900	308
Mid Somerset	0	797	713	-	1,125

The principal operating parameters of the constituent companies in 1947 is shown in the table.

Electricity supply 1947
Company	Electricity MWh			Connections kW	No. of Consumers
Company	Generated	Purchased	Sold	Connections kW	No. of Consumers
North Somerset	0	109,554	96,563	31,459	30,962
West Devon	9,720	7,025	13,991	5,190	7,782
Culm Valley	172	8,437	7,906	2,616	3,015
Bude	91	2,008	1,915	800	1,745
Burnham	0	1,918	1,797	-	1,445
Aldeburgh	62	878	809	367	704
Holsworthy	0	809	777	350	479
Mid Somerset	0	3,155	2,952	-	1,336

== Finances ==
The annual turnover and profit of Christy Brothers 1926-32 was as shown.

Year	Turnover £	Profit £
1926	126,720	9,668
1927	169,823	12,826
1928	138,581	17,187
1929	148,731	15,233
1930	163,332	14,233
1931	196,575	17,130
1932	239,069	29,755

In March 1933 Christy company offered £225,000 worth of shares on the Stock Exchange.

== Directors ==
The company directors in 1933 were:

- Frank Christy (chairman, joint managing director)
- Leonard Fell Christy (joint managing director)
- Charles Ernest Smith (director since 1913)
- Henry Joseph Aylott (director since 1924)
- Geoffrey Christy (from 1933)

The company's registered address was 171 Broomfield Road, Chelmsford, Essex.

== Abolition ==
The Christy Brothers and Company Limited and all its constituent companies were abolished on 31 March 1948 when the British Electricity Industry was nationalised. The generating plant and transmission systems devolved to the British Electricity Authority and the distribution systems to the appropriate geographical electricity board, for example the Eastern Electricity Board, the Southern Electricity Board, etc.

The company was one of five electricity undertakings that operated over large geographical areas. Its assets were divided between two or more area electricity boards. The five companies were:

- British Power and Light Corporation
- Christy Brothers and Company Limited
- Edmundsons Electricity Corporation
- Electrical Finance and Securities Company Limited
- Midland Counties Electric Supply Company Limited, see Midland Electric Light and Power Company Limited

== See also ==
- List of pre-nationalisation UK electric power companies
