= Electrical Finance and Securities Company =

- Company type: Public company
- Industry: Electricity supply
- Founded: 8 June 1914
- Defunct: 31 March 1948
- Fate: Nationalisation
- Successor: British Electricity Authority, area electricity boards
- Headquarters: London, United Kingdom
- Area served: Parts of Middlesex, Kent, Lothians, Boston Lincolnshire
- Key people: see text
- Services: Electricity supply
- Net income: £47,107 (1930)
- Owner: Shareholder

The Electrical Finance and Securities Company Limited was a UK electricity holding company which provided financing to electricity undertakings to enable them to start supplies of electricity. Its subsidiary companies were in south east England, Lincolnshire and south Scotland. It was registered on 8 June 1914 and was abolished upon nationalisation of the electricity industry in 1948.

The Finance and Securities Company had the ‘purpose of financing electric supply undertakings and the securing of provisional orders for the supply of electricity’. It was established on 8 June 1914.

== Subsidiary companies ==
Lothians Electric Power Act 1904
- Act of Parliament
- Parliament of the United Kingdom
- Long title: An Act for incorporating and conferring Powers on the Lothians Electric Power Company.
- Citation: 4 Edw. 7. c. ccvii

Dates
- Royal assent: 15 August 1904

Other legislation
- Repealed by: South of Scotland Electricity Order Confirmation Act 1956

Status: Repealed

Text of statute as originally enacted

By the early 1930s the securities company owned and controlled five subsidiary companies, namely:

- Colne Valley Electric Supply Company Limited, registered 28 June 1912, Pinner Electric Lighting Order 1913 for Pinner, by 1922 there is also a sub-station at Rickmansworth and Chorley Wood.
- Northwood Electric Light & Power Company Limited, registered 23 June 1900, to supply Northwood, Ruislip and Eastcote Middlesex.
- Foots Cray Electricity Supply Company Limited, registered 15 December 1905, to supply Foots Cray Kent, power in bulk taken from Bexley.
- Lothians Electric Power Company, incorporated by Lothians Electric Power Act 1904 (4 Edw. 7. c. ccvii) to supply parts of Midlothian, East Lothian, Peebles and Lanark, power stations at Kingsknowe, West Linton and Auchengray planned.
- Boston & District Electric Supply Company Limited

The growth of the companies is illustrated in the table.

Consumers and connected load 1921-47
Year	No. of Consumers	Connected or maximum load kW
Colne Valley
1921	629	589
1922	882	893
1923	1178	1810
1924	1641	1840
1925	2326	2668
1926	3034	3728
1927	3777	5000
1928	4557	6231
1929	5485	8458
1930	6270	11,031
1931	7778	14,022
1937	12,055+2027	19,385
1947	30,055	23,884
Northwood
1921	544	1154
1922	687	1480
1923	863	1980
1924	1057	2290
1925	1284	2805
1926	1472	3210
1927	1711	3871
1928	2023	4801
1929	2280	5625
1930	2771	7082
1931	3320	8460
1937	33,042	13,012
1947	14,800	19,186
Foots Cray
1921	587	588
1922	577	623
1923	627	697
1924	558	725
1925	758	877
1926	812	960
1927	892	1130
1928	975	1350
1929	1076	1607
1930	1170	2033
1931	1299	2455
1937	7149	2823
1947	1916	3403
Lothians
1924	411	1040
1925	889	3957
1926	121,0	4668
1927	1488	5400
1928	1939	7605
1929	2868	10,217
1930	3541	12,101
1931	4139	14,210
1937	26,297	12,214
1947	15,172	17,684
Boston & District
1924	160	285
1925	274	606
1926	372	1082
1927	519	1468
1928	638	1780
1929	1378	2918
1930	1697	3602
1931	2079	4532
1937	12,373	6340
1947	4730	9713

== Financial ==
The company offered £320,000 of shares on the stock market in May 1927. A further issue of shares was made in January 1932.

The company's net profits were £5,253 (1921); £5,641 (1922); £6,253 (1923); £8,009 (1924); £16,586 (1925); £20,660 (1926); £32,928 (1928); £39,320 (1929); £47,107 (1930).

== Directors ==
The directors of the company were:

- James Taylor (1927)
- G. H. Nesbett (1927, chairman 1931 to 1940)
- W. B. Cownie (1927, 1932)
- H. T. Barnett (1932)
- H. C. Drayton (1932, chairman 1941 & 1942)
- Sir James Devonshire (1942)

The registered office was 62-63 Queen Street, Cannon Street, London, EC4 (1927), and Salisbury Square House, Salisbury Square, London, EC4 (1932).

== Abolition ==
The Electrical Finance and Securities Company Limited and all its constituent companies were abolished on 31 March 1948 when the British Electricity Industry was nationalised. The generating plant and transmission systems devolved to the British Electricity Authority and the distribution systems to the appropriate geographical electricity board, for example the Eastern Electricity Board, the Southern Electricity Board, etc.

The company was one of five electricity undertakings that operated over large geographical areas. Its assets were divided between two or more area electricity boards. The five companies were:

- British Power and Light Corporation
- Christy Brothers and Company Limited
- Edmundsons Electricity Corporation
- Electrical Finance and Securities Company Limited
- Midland Counties Electric Supply Company Limited, see Midland Electric Light and Power Company Limited

== See also ==
- List of pre-nationalisation UK electric power companies
