= Edmundsons Electricity Corporation =

British electric company

Edmundsons Electricity Corporation Limited
- Company type: Public limited company
- Industry: Energy, Electricity supply
- Founded: 1897
- Defunct: 31 March 1948
- Fate: Abolished by nationalisation
- Headquarters: London, England
- Area served: England and Wales
- Key people: see text
- Products: Electricity generation and supply
- Revenue: See table of net profit

The Edmundsons Electricity Corporation Limited was an electricity holding company that controlled and owned over 60 electricity undertakings throughout England and Wales. It was established in 1897 and was dissolved, despite its objections, as a consequence of the nationalisation of the British electricity supply industry in 1948.

== History ==
The Edmundsons Electricity Corporation Limited was founded in 1897. Its initial aim was to acquire and extend the business of Messrs. J. Edmundsons Company Limited of 19 Great George Street, Westminster. The latter was an electricity engineering company which, since 1888, had installed electricity systems in large buildings. The corporation raised capital of £200,000 in 1897 by the sale of shares. The capital was used to build generating stations and electricity supply systems (electricity undertakings) in Folkestone, Winchester, Salisbury, Ventnor and Shrewsbury. The corporation went on to acquire further electricity company franchises. For example:

- By 1908 Edmundsons had interests in nearly 50 local electricity supply undertakings.
- In 1923 the corporation had a controlling interest in the Cromer, Dorking, and the Frome undertakings.

In 1925 the Greater London and Counties Trust (GLCT) was established using American capital. The aim of the trust was to acquire financially weak electricity undertakings and to offer an economic supply using an electricity grid scheme. In 1928 the GLCT acquired 95 per cent of Edmundsons Corporation shares, which at that time directly or indirectly controlled 29 supply companies.

In the 1930s the Edmondson Corporation consolidated and modernised its undertakings reducing them from 64 in 1932 to 23 in 1939.

=== Principal subsidiaries ===
The corporation was based around the following geographical groups.

- The Shropshire, Worcestershire and Staffordshire Electric Power Company, which had undertakings at Dudley, Kidderminster, Smethwick and Stourport. The Shropshire company itself controlled:
  - The South Wales Electric Power Distribution Company, which had undertakings at Llynfi and Upper Boat.
- The Urban Electric Supply Company, which had undertakings at Berwick-upon-Tweed, Caterham, Dartmouth and Kingswear, Glossop, Godalming, Grantham, Hawick, Illogan, Newbury, Newton Abbot, Redruth, Stamford, and Walton and Weybridge. The Urban Electric Supply Company itself controlled:
  - The East Anglian Electric Supply Company, which had undertakings at Cromer and Southwold.
  - The Cornwall Electric Power Company, which had undertakings at Hayle and Carn Brea.
- The Western Electricity Supply Company Limited, which included the Stroud undertaking.
- The Wessex Electricity Company, which had undertakings at Amesbury, Andover, Chipping Norton, Downton, Frome, Lymington, Newbury and Yeovil.
- The Bedfordshire, Cambridgeshire and Huntingdonshire Electricity Company. For financial convenience Little Barford power station was constructed and financed by the B. C. and H. Power Station Company Limited. The power station was leased to the Bedfordshire, Cambridgeshire and Huntingdonshire Electricity Company for 99 years to operate.

=== Growth ===
At the general meeting of the corporation in July 1947 it was noted that the corporation had six main subsidiaries and owned 12 other companies and supplied an area of 15,000 square miles (38,850 km^{2}) which was nearly a quarter of England and Wales. The development of the organisation since 1932 was also analysed.

Parameter	1932	1946/7
Capital expenditure	£17 million	£41.5 million
Mains constructed	5,200 miles	15,500 miles
Receipts from electricity sales	£2 million	£12 million
Electricity price	2.7d./kWh	1.7d./kWh
Return on capital expenditure	4.5 %	2.8 %
Coal price	13s 8d. per ton	44s per ton

== Nationalisation ==
The Edmundson Electricity Corporation opposed nationalisation of the electricity industry. It claimed that state ownership would increase costs, become a burden on tax payer, and prevent consumer choice. It spent £70,000 on an advertising campaign to this effect.

The Edmundson Electricity Corporation was abolished on 31 March 1948 under the terms of the Electricity Act 1947 which nationalised the British electricity supply industry. The company's power stations and electricity transmission systems were vested in the British Electricity Authority. The local distribution systems and the electricity supply functions were vested in the various geographical electricity boards.

The company was one of five electricity undertakings that operated over large geographical areas. Its assets were divided between two or more area electricity boards. The five companies were:

- British Power and Light Corporation
- Christy Brothers and Company Limited
- Edmundsons Electricity Corporation
- Electrical Finance and Securities Company Limited
- Midland Counties Electric Supply Company Limited, see Midland Electric Light and Power Company Limited

== Corporation profits ==
A summary of the financial profits of the corporation from 1905 to 1946 were as follows:

Edmundsons Corporation net profit
Year	Net profit £	Year	Net profit £
1905	58,823	1920	86,685
1906	59,993	1921	95,562
1907	35,588	1922	122,006
1911	47,649	1926	125,417
1912	54,264	1927	141,696
1913	61,684	1928	164,180
1914	65,666	1929	163,046
1915	65,311	1930	222,570
1916	61,772	1933	470,521
1917	64,521	1934	537,099
1918	59,920	1935	597,016
1919	55,604	1946	647,362

== Key people ==
=== Company directors ===
The inaugural directors of the corporation in 1897 were:

- John R. Wigham (chairman)
- Francis E. Gripper (managing director)
- W. R. Davies
- Joshua W. Edmundson
- Walter B. Hopkins
- Henry Wigham

The registered office in 1897 was at 19 Great George Street, Westminster, London

The directors in 1935 were:

- Wade H. Hayes (deputy chairman)
- Lord Eltisley
- Lord Meston
- Sir Holberry Mensforth
- R. P. Sloan
- A. Winterbottom

By 1938 Sir Thomas Royden, later Lord Royden had been appointed as chairman, he remained chairman until nationalisation.

In 1935 the registered office was at Thames House, Millbank, Westminster.

== See also ==
- List of pre-nationalisation UK electric power companies
- Timeline of the UK electricity supply industry
- List of power stations in England
- List of power stations in Wales
