= North Wales and South Cheshire Joint Electricity Authority =

- Formerly: North Wales Power Company
- Company type: Public company
- Industry: Electricity supply
- Founded: 1 August 1923
- Defunct: 31 March 1948
- Fate: Nationalisation
- Successor: British Electricity Authority, Merseyside and North Wales Electricity Board
- Area served: North Wales, Cheshire and Staffordshire
- Services: Electricity supply

The North Wales and South Cheshire Joint Electricity Authority supplied electricity to an extensive area of North Wales and parts of Cheshire and Shropshire. As constituted in 1923 the joint electricity authority transferred all its rights to distribution of electricity in the area to the North Wales Power Company. The authority was effectively the power company. Both the joint authority and the power company were abolished in 1948 upon the nationalisation of the British electricity supply industry.

== Background ==
The North Wales and South Cheshire Joint Electricity Authority was the first joint electricity authority (JEA) to be constituted, on 1 August 1923, under the provisions of the Electricity (Supply) Act 1919 (9 & 10 Geo. 5. c. 100), and the Electricity (Supply) Act 1922 (12 & 13 Geo. 5. c. 46). The JEA transferred some powers, rights and obligations to the North Wales Power Company, this included all rights of distribution of electricity in the area. From this time the JEA was effectively the North Wales Power Company. The power company developed several hydro-power stations and extended transmission lines to towns and industrial areas.

== North Wales Power Company ==
The North Wales Power Company Limited was registered on 30 July 1903 as the North Wales Power and Traction Company Limited. Its business was as engineers, suppliers of electricity, and owners of tramways and railways. It ran 13 1/4 miles (21.3 km) of 1 ft 11 1/2 in (597 mm) gauge tramways in Llandudno and Colwyn Bay, and Wrexham and district. The company’s electricity was generated by hydro-electricity. At Cwm Dwli water was drawn from Lake Llydaw and flowed through tunnels and steel pipes to the power station in the Gwynant valley. In 1915 electricity was generated by four Pelton wheels coupled to four 1.5 MW 3-phase alternators. Electricity was supplied to quarries and in bulk to long distance consumers.

The North Wales and South Cheshire Electricity District Order 1923 was confirmed on 1 August 1923. The district included Anglesey, Caernarvonshire, Denbighshire, Flintshire, Merionethshire, Montgomeryshire, and parts of Cheshire, Shropshire, and Cardegoneshire. The area served was about 1,000 square miles. At its first meeting on 12 October 1923 the joint electricity authority transferred to the company certain powers, rights and obligations regarding the generation and supply of electricity.

In 1924 the North Wales Power Company issued stock to the value of £2.2 million. This was used to construct several major projects: to build the Maentwrog power station with an initial capacity of 16,000 horsepower (12 MW); to increase the catchment area of the Cwm Dyli power station; to extend the transmission system to Crewe, to industrial districts, and to coastal towns.

In 1929 the British Power and Light Corporation acquired a controlling interest in the North Wales Power Company.

== Technical specifications ==
The engineering and financial information on the North Wales Power Company in 1923 and 1937 is shown in the table.

North Wales Co. technical and financial data
Year	1923	1937
Turbo-generators, MW	4 × 1.0 1 × 1.5	(see table below)
Maximum load, kW	6,000	35,700
Total connections, kW	11,000	73,724
Electricity generated, MWh	6,691	36,789
Electricity purchased, MWh	3,248	108,378
Electricity sold, MWh	8,459	127,844
Gross surplus, £	31,365	261,386
Number of consumers		3,435

The technical and operational data for the constituent generating stations is shown in the tables.

		Electricity sent out MWh			
Station name	Water turbines in 1937, MW	1937	1946	1947	1948
Cwm Dyli	2 × 1.0, 1 × 1.5, 1 × 3.0	9,582	8,904	12,176	8,924
Dolgarrog No. 1	4 × 1.0 (DC)	1,421	52,443	42,037	59,468
Dolgarrog No. 2	1 × 1.2, 2 × 5.0, 1 × 6.5	35,351	52,443	42,037	59,468
Maentwrog	4 × 6.0	30,188	34,181	29,899	45,645

North Wales Power Company generating plant in 1948
Name	Year commissioned	Head of water	Water wheels	Alternators MW	Output MW
Cwm Dyli	1906	1,150 feet	4 (total 9,000 HP, 6.7 MW),	2 × 1.0 1 × 1.5 1 × 3.0	5.0
Dolgarrog No. 1	1909	800 feet 1,075 feet	1	1.2	
Dolgarrog No. 2	1925	800 feet 1,075 feet	3	1 × 6.5 2 × 5.0	18.0
Maentwrog	1928	620 feet		4 × 6.0	24.0

== Abolition ==
The North Wales and South Cheshire Joint Electricity Authority and the North Wales Power Company Limited were both abolished on 31 March 1948 when the British Electricity Industry was nationalised. The generating plant and transmission systems devolved to the British Electricity Authority and the distribution systems to the Merseyside and North Wales Electricity Board.

== See also ==
- List of pre-nationalisation UK electric power companies
- London and Home Counties Joint Electricity Authority
- North West Midlands Joint Electricity Authority
- West Midlands Joint Electricity Authority
- Joint electricity authority
