= West Midlands Joint Electricity Authority =

- Company type: Public Company
- Industry: Electricity generation and supply
- Founded: 21 December 1925
- Defunct: 31 March 1948
- Successor: British Electricity Authority, Midlands Electricity Board
- Headquarters: Wolverhampton
- Area served: Shropshire, Staffordshire and Worcestershire.

The West Midlands Joint Electricity Authority was a United Kingdom statutory body established in 1925 with the responsibility to "provide or secure the provision of a cheap and abundant supply of electricity” in the Midland counties of Shropshire, Staffordshire and Worcestershire. The Authority acquired electricity in bulk from electricity undertakings for distribution, and operated power stations. The Authority was abolished upon nationalisation of the British electricity industry in 1948.

== Background ==
The Electricity (Supply) Act 1919 (9 & 10 Geo. 5. c. 100) established the statutory body of the Electricity Commissioners ‘to promote, regulate and supervise the supply of electricity’ under the direction of the Board of Trade. The act provided for the commissioners to constitute electricity districts and, where necessary, to establish joint electricity authorities (JEAs), ‘to provide or secure the provision of a cheap and abundant supply of electricity’, with the agreement of the electricity undertakings concerned. The aim of the joint authorities was to produce electricity more economically by inter-connecting power stations and transmission systems. The authority would acquire all the power stations in the area and build large, efficient and economic super-stations. In the event only four joint authorities were established: the London and Home Counties JEA; the North Wales and South Cheshire JEA; the North West Midlands JEA; and the West Midlands JEA.

== West Midlands Joint Electricity Authority ==
The West Midlands Joint Electricity Authority was formally established on 21 December 1925 by the West Midlands Electricity District Order 1925 made under section 7 of the Electricity (Supply) Act 1919. The district covered an area of about 1,000 square miles, including most of Shropshire, Staffordshire and Worcestershire. The JEA included representatives of the Midland Electricity Corporation; Wolverhampton, Walsall, West Bromwich, Cannock and Shrewsbury councils; colliery owners; railway companies; and electricity industry workers. In June 1927 the West Midlands JEA offered for sale £2 million of stock on the stock market, which was used to purchase the generating stations and transmission lines in the district. In late 1927 the West Midlands JEA acquired four power stations: Ocker Hill formerly operated by the Midland Electric Corporation for Power Distribution; the 30 MW Wolverhampton power station; the 28 MW Walsall Birchills power station; and the 6.65 MW West Bromwich station. The JEA built the 200 MW Ironbridge A power station (commissioned 1932). However, there was local opposition to the proposal for Ironbrige, landowners in Buildwas opposed the compulsory purchase of land. A local inquiry was held where changes to the area were put forward. Further objections resulted in another local inquiry. Formal consent was only granted in August 1928. The JEA's stations were linked through a transmission system operating at 33 kV. On 1 October 1938 the JEA took over Shrewsbury power station from the local authority. The interconnected power stations enabled the JEA to reduce the wholesale price of electricity by one-third between 1930 and 1936.

== Operating statistics ==
The electricity sold by the generating stations and purchased by the WMJEA was as shown.

Electricity transmission 1922-26
Year	Electricity transferred, MWh
1922	58,981
1923	73,809
1924	91,368
1925	106,479
1927	122,895

In 1937 the key engineering and financial statistics for the WMJEA was as follows.

The capacity and output of the individual stations of the WMJEA in 1937 was as shown.

WMJEA Generating statistics, 1937
	Ironbridge	Ocker Hill	Walsall	Wolverhampton
Boiler plant, lb/hr	1,175,000	540,000	314,000	460,000
Generators, MW	2 × 50	1 × 3.0 2 × 3.2 4 × 5.5 1 × 13.2	1 × 5.0 2 × 6.25	3 × 5.0 2 × 7.5
Total, MW	100.0	44.0	17.5	30.0
Electricity generated, MWh	398,740	2,950	12,718	10,553

The output of the individual WMJEA power stations over time was as shown.

WMJEA electricity generation, 1937-48
	Ironbridge	Ocker Hill	Shrewsbury	Walsall	Wolverhampton
1937	398,740	2,950	Not WMJEA	12,718	10,553
1946	841,859	22,889	331,275	13,212	125,271
1947	719,244	31,314	194,065	30,849	140,008
1948	685,148	184,221	194,091	28,893	99,860

The West Midlands JEA's principal office was at Phoenix Buildings, Dudley Road, Wolverhampton.

The West Midlands JEA was considered to have been successful. It took over the operation of power stations in its area and built a large-scale station at Ironbridge all of which were interconnected with high voltage transmission lines.

In the year ending 31 December 1947, the last full year of its operation, the West Midlands Joint Electricity Authority generated 977,571 MWh, purchased 1,045,019 MWh and sold 1025163 MWh with a value of £2,841,390 to 26,058 consumers. The gross operating surplus was £484,607.

== Abolition ==
The West Midlands JEA was abolished on 31 March 1948 under the provisions of the Electricity Act 1947 which nationalised British electricity supply industry. The WMJEA’s assets were split between the British Electricity Authority (generation and transmission) and the Midlands Electricity Board (distribution).

== See also ==
- List of pre-nationalisation UK electric power companies
- London and Home Counties Joint Electricity Authority
- North West Midlands Joint Electricity Authority
- North Wales and South Cheshire Joint Electricity Authority
- Joint electricity authority
