= 1894 Ogmore and Garw Urban District Council election =

Urban District Council election

The first elections to the Ogmore and Garw Urban District Council were held in December 1894. Six members were elected from both the Ogmore and Garw wards making a total of twelve members on the authority.

The Council replaced the Local Board. All the old Ogmore members were returned but only two of the old Garw members.

== Ogmore Ward ==
Ogmore Ward 1894
Party	Candidate	Votes	%	±%
	John Owen	785		
	J. Blandy Jenkins	758		
	D. Sims Rees	755		
	W. Llewellyn	750		
	David Evans	702		
	Jenkin Williams	628		
	T.W. Job	500		
	T. Thomas	362		

== Garw Ward ==
Garw Ward 1894
Party	Candidate	Votes	%	±%
	E.J. Parry	540		
	D. John	494		
	H. Rees	378		
	D. Matthews	364		
	J. Harrison	328		
	T. Lewis	326		
	W. Davies	307		
	E. Lewis	307		
	D, Morgan	225		
	J. Maddock	201		
	D.L Griffiths	192		
	D. Edwards	192		
	J. Crook	169		
	J. Keen	41		
