= Bedfordshire, Cambridgeshire and Huntingdonshire Electricity Company =

United Kingdom legislation (1925–1948)

- Company type: Public company
- Industry: Electricity supply
- Founded: 1925
- Defunct: 31 March 1948
- Fate: Nationalisation
- Successor: British Electricity Authority, Eastern Electricity Board
- Area served: Bedfordshire, Cambridgeshire, Huntingdonshire and the Isle of Ely
- Products: Electricity supply

The Bedfordshire, Cambridgeshire and Huntingdonshire Electricity Company was a British electricity supply company that provided electricity to consumers in the English counties of Bedfordshire, Cambridgeshire, Huntingdonshire and the Isle of Ely. The company was established in 1925 and was abolished in 1948 upon the nationalization of the British electricity supply industry.

== Foundation ==
Bedfordshire, Cambridgeshire and Huntingdonshire Electricity Act 1925
- Act of Parliament
- Parliament of the United Kingdom
- Long title: An Act for incorporating and conferring powers upon the Bedfordshire Cambridgeshire and Huntingdonshire Electricity Company and for other purposes.
- Citation: 15 & 16 Geo. 5. c. cxxxii

Dates
- Royal assent: 22 December 1925

Text of statute as originally enacted

The Bedfordshire, Cambridgeshire and Huntingdonshire Electricity Company was founded in 1925 under the provisions of the Bedfordshire, Cambridgeshire and Huntingdonshire Electricity Act 1925 (15 & 16 Geo. 5. c. cxxxii). The company aimed to generate, or otherwise acquire, electricity for distribution to consumers in the counties of Bedfordshire, Cambridgeshire, Huntingdonshire and the Isle of Ely. This was an area of about 1,200 square miles. From the beginning until 1935 the company was run by the North Metropolitan Electricity Company.

== Infrastructure ==
In 1927 the company was authorised to acquire land at Little Barford, Bedfordshire for the construction of a transformer station and a future power station. The transformer station was connected to the 132 kV national grid then under construction. Little Barford was connected to the midlands circuit via Bedford, Northampton, Warwick and Hams Hall (Birmingham). It was connected to Peterborough to the north and to the South East England 132 kV scheme via Bedford.

Distribution of electricity was at 11 kV initially from Sandy to Huntingdon, St. Ives, Histon and Ely. Then via a line from Royston to Shepreth to Fulbourn.

Before the power station was available the Central Electricity Board provided grid supplies to Little Barford which allowed the company to supply electricity to its consumers.

In 1935 it was announced that control of the Bedford company was being transferred from the North Metropolitan Electricity Company to Edmundons’ Electricity Corporation.

A summary of the operation of the company in 1937 is given in the table,

Company operations 1937
Maximum load MW	7,522
Number of consumers	11,411
Total connections kW	38,077
Electricity purchased MWh	32,346
Energy purchased	£52,070
Energy sold MWh	28,073
Revenue from sales	£151,102
Surplus	£57,231

== Little Barford power station ==
To build the power station at Little Barford an operating company was established. The B. C. & H. Power Station Company Limited was incorporated on 26 February 1938. It was owned and controlled by the Bedfordshire, Cambridgeshire and Huntingdonshire Electricity Company, then a subsidiary of Edmundsons Electricity Corporation. Construction was authorised in June 1938. To finance the construction the B. C. & H. Power Station Company issued £1,650,000 of stock at the Stock Exchange. The first electricity from the power station was in August 1941 when 30 MW was available, the maximum generating capacity of 120 MW was available from May 1942. For full details see the Little Barford Power Station.

=== Directors ===
In 1938 the directors of the B. C. & H. Power Station Company were: Sir Thomas Royden (chairman); Frank Henry James; Brigadier-General Wade Hampton Hayes; and Robert Patrick Sloan.

=== Operations ===
Little Barford power station operations in the final years of the company are as shown in the table.

Little Barford power station operations 1946-48
Year	1946	1947	1948
Maximum load MW	89.6	116.8	112
Electricity supplied MWh	366.26	400.63	223.53
Running hours			8562

== Abolition ==
The Bedfordshire, Cambridgeshire and Huntingdonshire Electricity Company was abolished on 31 March 1948 under the provisions of the Electricity Act 1947 which nationalized the British electricity supply industry. The generating plant and transmission system was vested in the British Electricity Authority and the distribution infrastructure in the Eastern Electricity Board.

Generation of electricity at Little Barford power station continued until the October 1981.

== See also ==
- Timeline of the UK electricity supply industry
- List of pre-nationalisation UK electric power companies
- Derbyshire and Nottinghamshire Electric Power Company
- Leicestershire and Warwickshire Electric Power Company
