= Midland Electric Corporation for Power Distribution =

- Company type: Public
- Industry: Electricity supply
- Founded: 23 June 1897
- Defunct: 1 April 1948
- Fate: Nationalisation
- Successor: British Electricity Authority
- Headquarters: Birmingham
- Area served: West Midlands UK
- Key people: See text
- Products: Electricity supply
- Revenue: See tables

The Midland Electric Corporation for Power Distribution Limited (also known as the Midland Electric Corporation) was registered in 1897 to carry out the business of an electricity supply company. It supplied electricity to an area of 75 square miles in the West Midlands, and operated a power station at Ocker Hill, Tipton. The corporation was abolished in 1948 when the UK electricity supply industry was nationalised.

== Supply districts ==
The Midland Electric Corporation for Power Distribution Limited was registered on 23 June 1897. It obtained powers under local electric lighting orders to supply electricity to districts in the West Midlands.

These included, in the initial Midland Electric Power Distribution and Lighting Order 1898, confirmed by the Electric Lighting Order Confirmation (No. 15) Act 1898 (61 & 62 Vict. c. ccviii), Wednesbury, Bilston, Coseley, Darlaston, Heath Town, Rowley Regis, Sedgley, Short Heath, Tipton, Wednesfield, Willenhall, and Bentley.

In the Midland Electric Power Distribution and Lighting (Extension) Order 1899 Amblecote, Brierley Hill, and Quary Bank were included.

In the Midland Electric Power Distribution and Lighting (Extension) Order 1900 Bushbury and Penn were added.

In the Midland Electric Power Distribution Electric Lighting Order 1901 Tettenhall and Kingswinford were included.

In the Stourbridge Electric Lighting Order 1909 Stourbridge was added. The area of supply was about 75 square miles with a population of 280,000.

== Electricity supply ==
The Midland Electric Corporation had an electricity generating station at Ocker Hill at Tipton.

The original installation had a capacity of 3.1 MW. By 1923 the plant had a capacity of 25.8 MW and was ultimately 78 MW.

The electricity sold, financial costs and revenues at various times are summarised in the following tables.

Revenue, consumers and electricity sold 1908-12
Year	Gross trading revenue £	Net trading revenue £	Consumers	Electricity sold Gwh
1908	23,292	11,711	1292	6.67
1909	30,862	14,301	1449	7.11
1910	36,941	18,062	1784	8.77
1911	43,159	21,911	2172	10.26
1912	53,450	30,943	2530	12.90

Revenue, profit and electricity sold 1915-19
Year	Gross trading revenue £	Net trading revenue £	Net profit £	Electricity sold GWh
1915	91,272	55,940	48,199	22.248
1916	112,856	63,646	54,372	
1917	145,986	78,109	68,298	
1918	193,730	75,449	60,522	
1919	257,749	106,320	86,361	33.65

Revenue, connections and electricity sold 1921-37
Year	Revenue £	Costs £	Surplus £	Connections	Electricity sold GWh
1921	280,164	207,961	72,203	45,668	29.89
1922	275,964	136,894	139,070	49,856	33.48
1937	608,077	417,879	190,198	168,955	160.50

== Key people ==
In 1915 the directors were Edmund Knowles Muspratt (chairman), J. F. Albright, Sir John Sutherland Harmood-Banner, James Taylor, and G. H. Nisbett. The Company Secretary was G. Saies.

In 1920 the directors were James Taylor (chairman), Edmund Knowles Muspratt, Sir John Sutherland Harmood-Banner, G. H. Nisbett, and D. Sinclair. The Company Secretary was Gordon Saies. The chief engineer was G. R. J. Parkinson.

The corporation's registered office was at 21 Waterloo Street, Birmingham.

== Organisation ==
The Midland Electric Corporation (1900) Limited was registered on 15 May 1900 to promote the Midland Electric Corporation for Power Distribution Limited and to take over the latter company if necessary. It was to adopt an agreement between this company and the British Insulated Wire Company Limited dated 13 June 1900.

In 1918 the corporation purchased the Wednesbury power station for £75,000 but closed it down shortly after.

In 1920 the corporation issued a prospectus to raise £600,000 to expand power supplies.

In 1926 the Midland Electric Corporation was taken over by the West Midlands Joint Electricity Authority which then sold electricity in bulk to the corporation.

The corporation was abolished in 1948 under the provisions of the Electricity Act 1947 which nationalised the electricity supply industry. The power station and main distribution system was vested in the British Electricity Authority.

== See also ==
- List of pre-nationalisation UK electric power companies
