= Wolverhampton Power Station =

Former coal-fired power station in England

Wolverhampton power station
- Country: England
- Location: Wolverhampton
- Coordinates: 52°34′54″N 02°06′54″W
- Status: Decommissioned
- Construction began: 1894
- Commission date: 1895
- Decommission date: 1976
- Construction cost: £32,000
- Owners: Wolverhampton Corporation (1894–1928); West Midlands Joint Electricity Authority (1928–1948); British Electricity Authority (1948–1955); Central Electricity Authority (1955–1957); Central Electricity Generating Board (1958–1976)
- Operator: As owner

Thermal power station
- Primary fuel: Coal
- Turbine technology: Steam turbines
- Chimneys: 1 brick 115 feet (35 m); 1 steel 175 feet (53 m)
- Cooling towers: 1 concrete
- Cooling source: Circulating water

Power generation
- Units operational: 1 × 30 MW (from 1942)
- Make and model: Brush-Ljungstrom
- Nameplate capacity: 30 MW
- Annual net output: 125.271 GWh (1946)

Wolverhampton power station, also known as Commercial Road power station, supplied electricity to the Borough of Wolverhampton, England and the surrounding area from 1895 to 1976. It was redeveloped in several stages to meet growing demand for electricity: including the addition of new plant in 1902 to 1908, 1925 and 1942. The power station was initially owned and operated by Wolverhampton Corporation, but was transferred to the West Midlands Joint Electricity Authority in 1928. The British Electricity Authority assumed ownership at nationalisation in 1948. Wolverhampton power station was decommissioned in 1976.

== History ==
In 1883 Wolverhampton Corporation applied for a provisional order under the Electric Lighting Acts to generate and supply electricity to the town. The Wolverhampton Electric Lighting Order 1883 was granted by the Board of Trade and confirmed by Parliament in the Electric Lighting Orders Confirmation (No. 2) Act 1883 (46 & 47 Vict. c. ccxiv), however, no construction work was undertaken and a further provisional order, the Wolverhampton Electric Lighting Order 1890 was obtained, and confirmed by Parliament in the Electric Lighting Orders Confirmation Act 1890 (53 & 54 Vict. c. clxxxvi). The power station was built in Commercial Road (52°34′54″N 2°06′54″W) and was adjacent to the Wolverhampton Level canal for the delivery of coal. It first supplied electricity on 30 January 1895.

== Equipment specification ==
=== Original plant 1895 ===
The original 1895 plant at Wolverhampton power station comprised Marshall's horizontal compound engines coupled by ropes to Electric Construction Company and Parker dynamos, together with a Belliss engine coupled directly to a Parker dynamo. In 1898 the generating capacity was 632 kW and the maximum load on the system was 318 kW.

=== New plant 1902–04 ===
New plant was installed from 1902, partly to supply the local tramway system. This consisted of three Electric Construction Co 500 kW dynamos two driven by Willans engines and the third a Peache engine. To provide steam there was six Thompson Lancashire and two Davey-Paxman Economic boilers.

In 1908 the capacity was 6 MW there were two Babcock & Wilcox 20,000 lb/h (2.52 kg/s) boilers, two Willans & Robinson 1 MW driving ECC turbo-alternators. By 1913 there was 3 MW of direct current generating plant and 4 MW of alternating current generation.

In 1904 a refuse destructor was built in Crown Street, this generated steam to drive two 125 kW generators. Further plant was added to the destructor plant bringing the generating capacity up to 750 kW (1913) and 1 MW (1921). This comprised one 500 kW AC turbine and one 500 kW DC turbine.

=== Plant in 1923 ===
By 1923 the generating plant comprised:

- Coal-fired boilers generating up to 360,000 lb/h (45.4 kg/s) of steam, which was supplied:
- Generators:
  - 1 × 1,000 kW steam turbo-alternator
  - 1 × 2,000 kW steam turbo-alternator
  - 1 × 4,000 kW steam turbo-alternator
  - 3 × 5,000 kW steam turbo-alternators

These machines gave a total generating capacity of 22 MW of alternating current.

In addition the adjacent refuse destructor plant had a 500 kW turbine generating direct current.

Electricity was supplied to consumers at:

- 3-phase, 50 Hz AC at 400 & 230 Volts
- Direct current at 440 & 220 Volts

In 1925 the DC generators were scrapped and two 7.5 MW turbo-alternators were commissioned. This brought the capacity of the station to 23 MW.

=== Plant in 1942 ===
New plant was commissioned in 1942, comprising:

- Boilers:
  - 4 × Thompson La Mont stoker fired boilers each capable of producing 120,000 lb/h (15.1 kg/s), steam conditions 440 psi and 850 °F (30.3 bar, 454 °C), which supplied steam to:
  - 1 × 30 MW Brush-Ljungstrom turbo-alternator, generating electricity at 6.6 kV.
- Condenser cooling water was cooled in a single Hennibique reinforced concrete cooling tower with a capacity of 1.5 million gallons per hour (1.89 m^{3}/s).

== Operations ==
Operational data for the station was as follows.

In 1898 maximum electricity demand was 318 kW. There were 208 customers supplied with a total of 211,777 kWh of electricity plus 79,438 kWh for public lamps. The revenue from the sales of current was £6,139 offset by generating costs of £2,211.

=== Operating data 1921–23 ===
The operating data for the period 1921–23 was:

Wolverhampton power station operating data 1921–23
Electricity Use	Units	Year		
Electricity Use	Units	1921	1922	1923
Lighting and domestic	MWh	2,478	2,832	3,071
Public lighting	MWh	244	239	275
Traction	MWh	2,366	2,164	2,437
Power	MWh	16,240	10,522	14,088
Bulk supply	MWh	231	452	7,068
Total use	MWh	21,599	16,209	26,940
Load and connected load
Maximum load	kW	10,125	9,361	11,735
Total connections	kW	23,130	24,255	29,365
Load factor	Per cent	31.5	28.0	32.1
Financial
Revenue from sales of current	£	–	156,349	169,852
Surplus of revenue over expenses	£	–	63,573	79,523

Ownership of Wolverhampton power station was transferred to the West Midlands Joint Electricity Authority in 1928.

=== Operating data 1934–6 ===
The station capacity and output in the mid-1930s was:

Wolverhampton station capacity and output 1934–36
	1934–35	1935–36
Plant capacity MW	30.0	30.0
Maximum load MW	22.0	30.2
Maximum demand load factor %	22.3	13.0
Electricity generated MWh	42,999	34,568
Electricity sold MWh	39,578	31,857
Supply to Wolverhampton Corporation MWh	130,501	149,325

=== Operating data 1946 ===
Wolverhampton power station operating data in 1946 was:

Wolverhampton power station operating data, 1946
Year	Load factor per cent	Max output load MW	Electricity supplied MWh	Thermal efficiency per cent
1946	32.2	44,400	125,271	19.26

The British electricity supply industry was nationalised in 1948 under the provisions of the Electricity Act 1947 (10 & 11 Geo. 6 c. 54). The Wolverhampton electricity undertaking and the West Midlands Joint Electricity Authority were abolished. Ownership of Wolverhampton power station was vested in the British Electricity Authority, and subsequently the Central Electricity Authority and the Central Electricity Generating Board (CEGB). At the same time the electricity distribution and sales responsibilities of the Wolverhampton electricity undertaking were transferred to the Midlands Electricity Board (MEB).

=== Operating data 1954–72 ===
Operating data for the period 1954–72 was:

Wolverhampton power station operating data, 1954–72
Year	Running hours or load factor (per cent)	Max output capacity MW	Electricity supplied GWh	Thermal efficiency per cent
1954	3581	28	84.628	21.00
1955	5033	28	122.040	20.25
1956	4473	28	104.673	19.47
1957	4077	28	90.982	19.62
1958	2983	28	71.355	20.17
1961	(25.0 %)	28	61.305	20.20
1962	(10.7 %)	28	26.325	20.14
1963	(1.74 %)	28	4.274	18.34
1967	(22.6%)	28	55.32	18.54
1972	(24.1 %)	28	59.296	20.2

Electricity output in GWh of the station

Wolverhampton was an electricity supply district covering 106 square miles (275 km^{2}) and a population of 191,500. It encompassed the County Borough of Wolverhampton, and parts of the districts of Tettenhall, Cannock, Seisdon, Shifnal and Bridgnorth. The number of consumers and electricity sold was:

Year	1956	1957	1958
Number of consumers	62,943	64,354	65,353
Electricity sold MWh	475,606	492,667	523,067

== Closure and reuse ==
Wolverhampton power station was decommissioned on 25 October 1976. The main buildings have been adapted to commercial use.

== See also ==
- Timeline of the UK electricity supply industry
- List of power stations in England
