= Midland Electric Light and Power Company =

- Type: Public limited
- Industry: Electricity supply
- Founded: 12 December 1881
- Defunct: 1 April 1948
- Fate: Nationalisation
- Successor: Midland Electricity Board
- Headquarters: London (1915)
- Area served: Midlands
- Key people: See text
- Products: Electricity
- Revenue: See text

The Midland Electric Light and Power Company Limited was established in 1881 to build and operate an electric lighting installation in Leamington Spa and Birmingham, England. It was abolished upon nationalization of the electricity supply industry in 1948.

== History ==
The Midland Electric Light and Power Company was registered on 12 December 1881 to take over a concession for an electric lighting installation in Leamington Spa and Birmingham.

The capacity of the generating plant in 1898 was 290 kW, with a maximum load of 127 kW on a low tension continuous current (DC) system.

The total plant capacity was 524 kW in 1915. The generating plant comprised a Belliss engine coupled to an E. C. Company generator and 3 Robey compound condensing engines coupled to Chamberlain-Hookham generators. There was 12½ miles of mains supplying 520 customers.

In the early 1920s the company abandoned the generation of electricity in favour of purchasing it in bulk. In 1923 it purchased 907.627 MWh to supply a maximum load was 607 kW. The revenue was £18,532, the cost was £11,547 giving a surplus of £6,985. There were 2,135 connections on the system.

The total capital of the Midland Electric Light and Power Company was owned by the Midland Counties Electric Supply Company Limited (see section below) by 1926.

In the late 1930s electricity was received and distributed through four sites: Leamington Spa, Kenilworth, South Warwickshire and Warwick. There were 12,354 connections with a maximum load of 3,944 kW. Key operating data are shown in the table.

Midland Electric Light and Power operating data 1937
Sub-station	Expenditure £	Income £	Electricity sold MWh
Kenilworth	36,632	3,722	816
Leamington Spa	187,658	43,553	3,442
South Warwickshire	35,721	5,937	763
Warwick	78,638	16,512	1,585
Total	338,647	74,724	6,586

== Key people ==
The directors were A. H. Beatty, William Shearer, and F. Thursfield; the Chief Engineer was Percy Olver (1898).

Arthur Chamberlain and George Hookham (1915).

== Midland Counties Electric Supply Company Limited ==
Midland Electric Light and Power Company
- Formerly: Tramways Light and Power Company Limited
- Type: Public company
- Industry: Electricity supply
- Predecessor: Tramways Light and Power Company Limited
- Founded: 1921
- Founder: George Balfour
- Defunct: 31 March 1948
- Fate: Nationalisation
- Successor: British Electricity Authority
- Headquarters: London
- Key people: see directors
- Services: Electricity supply

The Tramway Light and Power Company Limited was founded in 1912 by the engineer George Balfour with the aim of acquiring the entire share and loan capital of several tramway companies. These included:

- Cheltenham and District Light Railway Company
- Nottinghamshire and Derbyshire Tramway Company

However, the company also acquired the capital and controlling interest of a number of electricity and power companies, these were:

- Leicestershire and Warwickshire Electric Power Company,
- Derbyshire and Nottinghamshire Electric Power Company,
- Midland Electric Light and Power Company,
- Leamington and Warwick Electrical Company Limited,
- Tamworth District Electric Supply Company Limited (from 1937)

=== Operations ===
The net profits of the tramway company were:

Tramway Light and Power Co. profits 1915-20
Year	1915	1916	1917	1918	1919	1920
Net profit £	28,627	33,420	39,274	42,321	43,947	53,696

In 1921 the company's power stations were at Warwick on the river Avon, Hinckley Leicestershire, and Ilkeston Derbyshire.

In view of the changed scope of its acquisitions the Tramway Light and Power Company was renamed in 1921 as the Midland Counties Electric Supply Company Limited, the company's office was 66 Queen Street London EC4.

In 1921 it offered £750,000 of shares on the stock market. There was a further offer of £5 million in December 1932, and £6,500,000 of shares in March 1937.

The net earnings of the company were:

Year	Net Earnings £
1926	186,169
1927	250,031
1928	306,510
1929	349,209
1930	376,963
1931	402,139
1932	432,940
1933	466,347
1934	550,227
1935	628,100
1936	664,703

=== Directors ===
The directors of the company were:

- Aretas Akers-Douglas, 1st Viscount Chilston (1921)
- Alfred Robert Holland (1921, 1932, 1937)
- George Balfour (1921, 1932 & 1937 chairman)
- Sir Joseph Nall (1932, 1937)
- William Shearer (1932 & 1937 managing director)
- George Verity (1932)
- Morrice Alfred Edwads (1937)

== Abolition ==
The Midland Electric Light and Power Company and the Midland Counties Electric Supply Company were abolished in 1948 under the provisions of the Electricity Act 1947 which nationalised the electricity supply industry. The main distribution system was vested in the Midlands Electricity Board.

The company was one of five electricity undertakings that operated over large geographical areas. Its assets were divided between two or more area electricity boards. The five companies were:

- British Power and Light Corporation
- Christy Brothers and Company Limited
- Edmundsons Electricity Corporation
- Electrical Finance and Securities Company
- Midland Counties Electric Supply Company Limited, see Midland Electric Light and Power Company Limited

== Archives ==
The surviving archives of the company are held at Manuscripts and Special Collections at the University of Nottingham. It comprises two signed directors' minute books covering April 1887-March 1948, and two shareholders' minute books covering February 1920-March 1948. The whereabouts of any other surviving company records is unknown.

== See also ==
- List of pre-nationalisation UK electric power companies
