= Birchills Power Station =

Coal-fired Power station

- Country: England
- Location: West Midlands
- Coordinates: 52.596089°N 1.997785°W
- Status: Decommissioned and demolished
- Commission date: 1916
- Decommission date: 1967
- Owners: Walsall Corporation (1916–1927); West Midlands Joint Electricity Authority (1927–1948); British Electricity Authority (1948–1955); Central Electricity Authority (1955–1957); Central Electricity Generating Board (CEGB) (1958–1982)
- Operator: As owner

Thermal power station
- Primary fuel: Coal
- Turbine technology: Steam turbines
- Cooling source: Canal water

Power generation
- Units operational: 2 x 6.25 MW and 1 x 5 MW
- Make and model: Brush
- Nameplate capacity: 17.5 MW
- Annual net output: 34.42 GWh (1936), 13.4 GWh (1955)

Birchills power station and Walsall power station are a series of three coal-fired power stations in, or near, Walsall in the West Midlands, England.

== Walsall power station (1895–1917) ==
The first electricity supply to Walsall began in the 1890s. In 1890 Walsall Corporation were granted a provisional order, the Walsall Electric Lighting Order 1890, by the Board of Trade to give them legal powers to generate and supply electricity to Walsall. The corporation built a power station in Wolverhampton Street Walsall (52°35′10″N 01°59′33″W) which began supplying electricity in 1895.

=== Plant ===
The plant at the station consisted coal-fired boilers supplying steam to Chandler compound engines coupled directly to Parker two-pole dynamos. The initial capacity of the plant was 240 kW with a maximum load of 155 kW. New equipment was added and the ultimate generating capacity was 2.6 MW.

=== Operation ===
In 1898 74,556 kWh of electricity was sold to 101 customers plus 21,820 kWh for public lighting. The sale of electricity produced an income for the corporation of £3,025 offset against generating costs of £804. The station was closed in 1917 except for emergency use.

== Walsall (Birchills) power station (1916–1967) ==
Variously known as Birchills power station, Walsall (Birchills) power station, and Birchills (Walsall) power station.

The first power station on the Birchills site was built for Walsall Corporation. Work began in 1914, and electricity was being generated by 1916, although the project was not officially completed until 1922.

=== Plant ===
In 1923 the electricity plant comprised 2 × 4 MW and 1 × 5 MW steam turbines driven by 100,000 lb/hr (12.60 kg/s) of steam. Electricity was available to consumers as:

- 3-phase AC, at 400 and 230 Volts
- DC at 210 and 105 Volts

The generating capacity by 1930 was 28 MW.

Cooling water was supplied by a pumping station on the Anson Branch canal, equipped with two Mather and Platt pumps capable of delivering 10.6 million gallons (48 Megalitres) per day. Spent water was discharged into the Wyrley and Essington Canal.

After Walsall power station was commissioned in 1949 it provided steam to this station.

=== Operation ===
In 1923 the station generated 13.17 GWh of electricity, some of this was used in the plant, the total amount sold was 10.22 GWh. The revenue from sales of current was £84,927, this gave a surplus of revenue over expenses of £40,522.

Ownership of the station passed to the West Midlands Joint Electricity Authority in 1927, and then to the British Electricity Authority following nationalisation in 1948 and subsequently the Central Electricity Authority and the Central Electricity Generating Board (CEGB).

The capacity and output of the station in the mid-1930s was:

Birchills power station capacity and output 1934–35
	1934–35	1935–36
Plant capacity MW	22.5	22.5
Maximum load MW	17.85	20.55
Maximum demand load factor %	21.3	19.1
Electricity generated MWh	33,866	34,420
Electricity sold MWh	28,609	29,770
Supply to Walsall Corporation MWh	31,254	38,511

The electricity output from the station is shown in the table.

Station electricity output 1946–67, GWh
Year	1946	1954	1955	1956	1957	1958	1959	1961	1962	1963	1967
Running hours (load factor)		1676	2515	1917	1017	88		2.1%	1.4%	3.04%	0.9%
Station output, GWh	13.212	9.679	13.426	11.414	5.601	0.228	3.423	2.953	2.003	4.256	0.908
Thermal efficiency %		12.67	13.04	13.30	11.22	4.74		13.72	11.48	10.16	7.97

Electricity output in MWh from Walsall (Birchills) power station

The power station closed in 1967.

== Walsall power station (1949–82) ==
Walsall power station was sanctioned by the Electricity Commissioners in November 1944 to be owned and operated by the West Midlands Joint Electricity Authority. Construction began in October 1946 on a 64 acre (25.9 ha) site at Birchills north of Walsall town centre and adjacent to the Walsall (Birchills) power station 1916–1967. During construction the British electricity supply industry was nationalised in 1948. The ownership of the incomplete Walsall power station was vested in the British Electricity Authority, and subsequently the Central Electricity Authority and the Central Electricity Generating Board (CEGB).

=== Plant ===
The plant at Walsall power station included:

12 × Babcock & Wilcox 180,000 lb/h boilers operating at a pressure of 650 psi and 875 °F (22.7 kg/s, 44.8 bar and 468 °C). The boilers supplied steam to:

6 × British Thomson-Houston 34 MW, 2-cylinder, double flow, impulse reaction turbines 3,000 rpm coupled to 3-phase 50 Hz alternators operating at 33/36 kV

Diesel engine house-set comprising 2 × 2 MW engines.

Cooling facilities comprised 6 × concrete hyperbolic cooling towers (Mitchell Construction Company) each with a capacity of 1.6 million gallons per hour (2.02 m^{3}/s), the total cooling capacity was 9.6 million gallons per hour (12.1 m^{3}/s). The cooling system was designed to cool water by 12 °F (6.7 °C). Make up water was drawn from the adjacent canal.

=== Commissioning ===
The first generating set was commissioned in July 1949; the second set in September 1949; the third in December 1949; the fourth in June 1950; the fifth in August 1954; and the final set in December 1954. The final generating capability was 208 MW, and the output capacity was 195 MW. The diesel sets were commissioned in April 1955. The station was officially opened on 30 September 1949 and was one of the largest and high output power plants. The station burned 'slack' coal, which consisted of fragments of coal and coal dust. Coal was delivered by road, rail and canal.

=== Operation ===
Operating data for Walsall power station for the period 1954–79 was:

Walsall power station operating data, 1954–79
Year	Running hours or load factor (per cent)	Max output capacity MW	Electricity supplied GWh	Thermal efficiency per cent
1954	8413	112	645.435	24.72
1955	8246	168	757.300	24.71
1956	8759	172	782.142	24.54
1957	8443	172	788.169	24.67
1958	6817	172	690.324	24.28
1961	(47.3 %)	195	807.089	24.28
1962	(40.1 %)	195	684.688	23.33
1963	(36.51 %)	195	623.690	22.79
1967	(43.5%)	195	750.014	23.43
1972	(32.5 %)	191	545.858	22.94
1979	(16.2 %)	191	270.928	19.43

Electricity output in GWh from Walsall power station

=== Walsall Electricity District ===
Walsall was an electricity supply district covering 37 square miles (96 km^{2}) and a population of 170,000 (1959). It encompassed the County Borough of Walsall, the districts of Aldridge and Brownhill (part) and part of Cannock district. The number of consumers and electricity sold was:

Year	1956	1957	1958
Number of consumers	47,367	48,896	50,705
Electricity sold MWh	214,398	230,715	243,328

=== Decommissioning ===
Walsall power station was decommissioned on 1 March 1982 after 33 years in use, and the stub of railway serving it west of Ryecroft Junction, was closed at the same time. The power station was closed as it was no longer deemed to be efficient, when much newer coal power stations built later in the 1960s, 1970s and 1980s with six or eight cooling towers can generate up to ten times more electricity as technology improves with bigger generators becoming more apparent on less coal consumption i.e. 2000 MW+ than Birchills could.

It was disused for nearly five years, finally being demolished in March 1987.

The substation it fed power to, also in Birchills is still in existence today, but is now fed from Rugeley 'B' station.
