= Salisbury power station =

Watermill in Salisbury, Wiltshire, England, UK

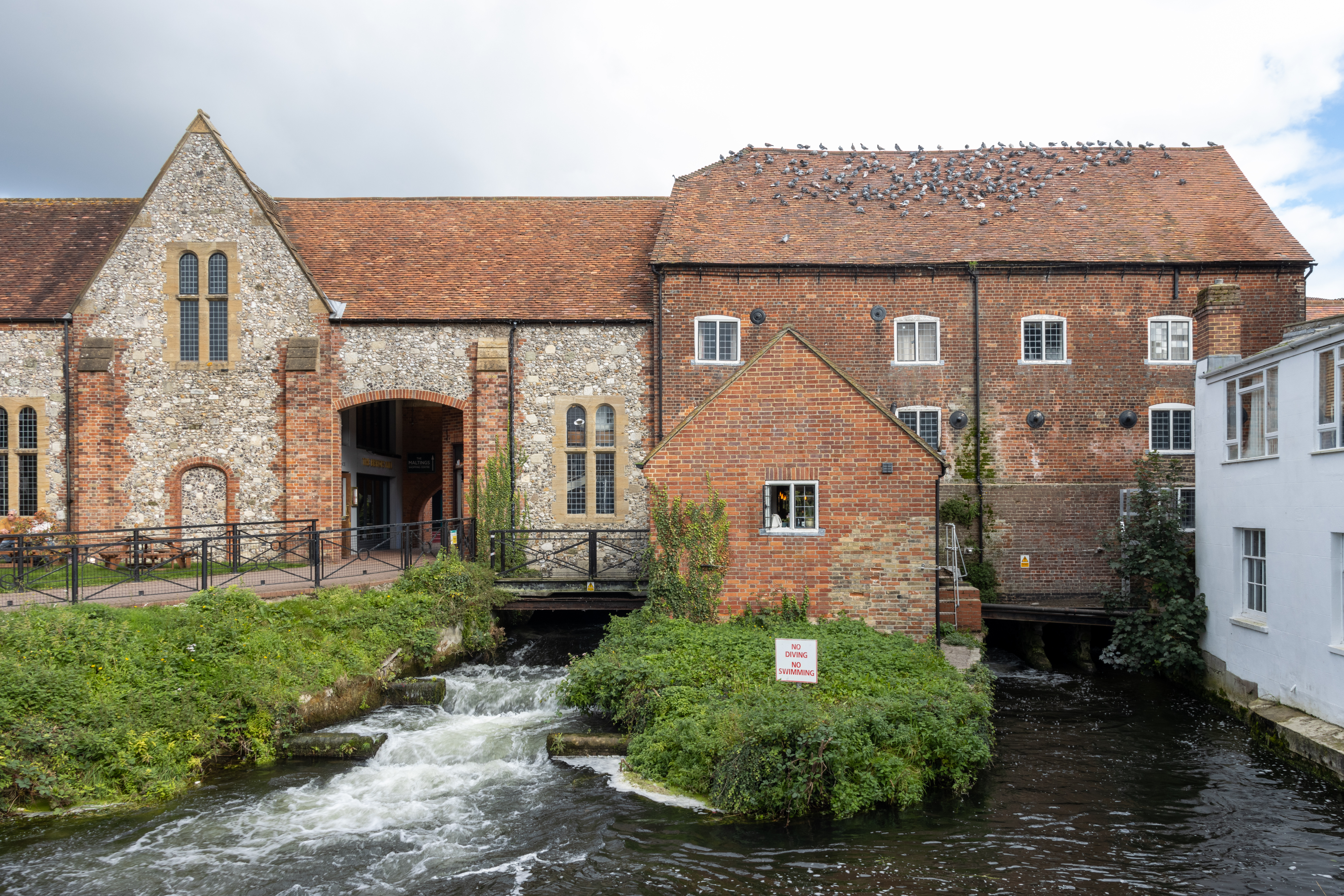
- Country: England
- Location: Salisbury
- Coordinates: 51°04′09″N 01°47′52″W
- Status: Decommissioned
- Construction began: 1896
- Commission date: 1898
- Decommission date: 1970
- Owners: Salisbury Electric Light and Supply Company Limited (1894–1948); British Electricity Authority (1948–1955); Central Electricity Authority (1955–1957); Central Electricity Generating Board (1958–1970)
- Operator: As owner

Thermal power station
- Primary fuel: Coal
- Secondary fuel: Water
- Turbine technology: Steam turbines
- Cooling source: River water

Power generation
- Units operational: 1 x 0.75 MW, 1 x 0.55 MW, 1 x 1.6 MW
- Make and model: English Electric and Brush
- Nameplate capacity: 2.9 MW
- Annual net output: 6,061 MWh (1946)

External links
- Commons: Related media on Commons

Salisbury power station supplied electricity to the English city of Salisbury and the surrounding area from 1898 to c. 1970. It was owned and operated by Salisbury Electric Light and Supply Company Limited prior to the nationalisation of the British electricity supply industry in 1948. The power station was redeveloped several times to incorporate new plant to replace retired equipment. The facilities included a water driven turbine.

== History ==
In 1895 Salisbury Electric Light and Supply Company Limited (registered on 20 June 1894) applied for a provisional order under the Electric Lighting Acts to generate and supply electricity to the city. The Salisbury Electric Lighting Order 1895 was granted by the Board of Trade and was confirmed by Parliament through the Electric Lighting Orders Confirmation (No. 5) Act 1895 (58 & 59 Vict. c. cii).

The power station was built at Town Mill, a former 18th-century water mill on the River Avon, just upstream of Fisherton Bridge in the city centre (51°04′09″N 1°47′52″W). It first supplied electricity on 22 June 1898.

== Equipment specification ==
The original plant at the power station comprised a 60 horse-power (45 kW) Gilkes water turbine running at 28 rpm and powered by the River Avon. The turbine was connected via belts to Parker dynamos. The capacity of the plant was 120 kW and there were 1,000 lamps connected to the system. In 1898 a new coal-fired steam plant was being built, equipped with Belliss engines and Parker dynamos.

=== Plant in 1923 ===
By 1923 the generating plant comprised:

- Coal-fired boilers generating up to 21,000 lb/h (2.64 kg/s) of steam which was fed to:
- Generators:
  - 1 × 90 kW reciprocating engine driving a generator
  - 1 × 100 kW reciprocating engine driving a generator
  - 1 × 180 kW reciprocating engine driving a generator
  - 2 × 200 kW reciprocating engines driving generators

The station also had a 30 kW water turbine. These machines gave a total generating capacity of 800 kW of direct current (DC).

The supply to consumers was at 420 and 210 volts DC.

=== Plant in 1955 ===
The plant in 1955 comprised:

- Boilers:
  - 4 × Babcock & Wilcox water tube boilers with a total evaporative capacity 49,000 lb/h (6.2 kg/s), producing steam at 200 psi and 700 °F (13.8 bar, 371 °C) which was fed to:
- Turbo-alternators:
  - 1 × English Electric 0.75 MW turbo-alternator, generating at 11 kV
  - 1 × English Electric 0.55 MW turbo-alternator, generating at 11 kV
  - 1 × Brush 1.60 MW, turbo-alternators, generating at 6.6 kV.

The total installed generating capacity was 2.9 MW, with an output capacity of 3MW.

Condenser cooling water was drawn from the River Avon.

== Operations ==
There was a trend for electricity consumption to increase during the course of the First World War (1914–1919). It was noted the Salisbury (and Taunton) municipal electricity undertakings suffered a fall in electricity sales in this period, associated with the lack of industry in these areas.

=== Operating data 1921–23 ===
The operating data for the period 1921–23 is shown in the table:

Salisbury power station operating data 1921–23
Electricity Use	Units	Year		
Electricity Use	Units	1921	1922	1923
Lighting and domestic use	MWh	414	437	495
Public lighting use	MWh	0.6	0.6	2.4
Traction	MWh	0	0	0
Power use	MWh	239	247	244
Total use	MWh	653	685	741
Load and connected load
Maximum load	kW	467	520	552
Total connections	kW	2162	2287	2375
Load factor	Per cent	19.6	18.6	18.9
Financial
Revenue from sales of current	£	–	17,036	18,151
Surplus of revenue over expenses	£	–	8,862	10,512

Under the terms of the Electricity (Supply) Act 1926 (16 & 17 Geo. 5. c. 51) the Central Electricity Board (CEB) was established. The CEB identified high efficiency 'selected' power stations that would supply electricity most effectively. The CEB also constructed the national grid (1927–33) to connect power stations within a region.

=== Operating data 1946 ===
Salisbury power station operating data for 1946 was:

Salisbury power station operating data in 1946
Year	Load factor per cent	Max output load MW	Electricity supplied MWh	Thermal efficiency per cent
1946	41.7	3,710	6,061	13.75

The British electricity supply industry was nationalised in 1948 under the provisions of the Electricity Act 1947 (10 & 11 Geo. 6. c. 54). The Salisbury electricity undertaking was abolished, ownership of Salisbury power station was vested in the British Electricity Authority, and subsequently the Central Electricity Authority and the Central Electricity Generating Board (CEGB). At the same time the electricity distribution and sales responsibilities of the Salisbury electricity undertaking were transferred to the Southern Electricity Board (SEB).

=== Operating data 1954–67 ===
Operating data for the period 1954–67 is shown in the table:

Salisbury power station operating data, 1954–67
Year	Running hours or load factor (per cent)	Max output capacity MW	Electricity supplied MWh	Thermal efficiency per cent
1954	1293	3	2708	9.85
1955	770	3	1698	9.57
1956	1053	3	2247	9.91
1957	348	3	772	8.12
1958	142	3	278	7.52
1961	(1.2 %)	3	321	5.71
1962	(0.9 %)	3	224	6.20
1963	(3.62 %)	3	952	8.22
1967	(4.0 %)	3	984	10.7

Salisbury power station was part of the Salisbury electricity supply district, an area of 421 square miles, including at least part of the districts of Salisbury, Wilton, Amesbury, Mere, Tisbury, Blandford, Wimborne, Andover and Stockbridge. Consumer supplies were available as AC, 1-phase, 240–480V and 3-phase, 240–415 V.

== Closure ==
Salisbury power station was decommissioned in about 1970. The building was Grade II listed under the name Salisbury Generating Station in 1952. In 1979 the site was owned by Salisbury City Council who wished to replace the station and surrounding buildings with a hotel, but this did not come to fruition.

== See also ==
- Timeline of the UK electricity supply industry
- List of power stations in England
