= Ogmore and Garw Urban District Council =

Former Welsh urban district council

Ogmore and Garw Urban District Council was an Urban District in Glamorgan, Wales. It was created in 1894 as a result of the Local Government Act 1894 and the 1894 Ogmore and Garw UDC election saw the election of the first members of the authority. The Council existed until 1973 and replaced the Ogmore and Garw Local Board of Health which had functioned for some years. Its boundaries were set in 1894. Initially, the council had twelve members but this was increased some years later, as a result of the increase in population. There were two wards, namely Garw Valley and Ogmore Valley.

The first councillors were elected at the 1894 elections. Most of the first members of the authority had served on the Local Board.

In the years leading up to the First World War, representatives of the Labour Party began to gain ground.

In 1974 the authority was abolished, and together with the former urban districts of Bridgend and Porthcawl and some outlying areas, formed the Ogwr Borough Council which, in turn, was subsumed into the unitary authority of Bridgend County Borough in 1996.

== Bibliography ==
- Parry, Jon (1989). "Labour Leaders and Local Politics 1888-1902: The Example of Aberdare". Welsh History Review. 14 (3): 399–416.

== See also ==
- 1894 Ogmore and Garw Urban District Council election
