= Electricity Commissioners =

UK electricity industry regulator

- Type: Government Regulatory Body
- Industry: Energy: Electricity supply
- Founded: February 1920
- Defunct: 31 March 1948
- Fate: Industry nationalisation
- Successor: British Electricity Authority
- Headquarters: Savoy Court, Strand, London WC2, United Kingdom
- Area served: Great Britain
- Key people: See section in text
- Services: Regulation of electricity industry
- Number of employees: 40 (1920)

The Electricity Commissioners were a department of the United Kingdom government's Ministry of Transport, which regulated the electricity supply industry from 1920 until nationalisation in 1948. It was responsible for securing reorganisation on a regional basis and considered schemes for centralisation in a small number of large generating stations owned by joint electricity authorities.

== History ==
In 1917, the UK government was planning the reconstruction of the nation's industries after the First World War. The Board of Trade set up the Electric Power Supply Committee, chaired by Sir Archibald Williamson, which proposed the effective nationalisation of the industry.

Subsequently, in 1919 under the chairmanship of Sir Henry Birchenough, the Advisory Council to the Ministry of Reconstruction produced the Report of the Committee of Chairmen (Note: Viscount Haldane, Sir Archibald Williamson and Sir Charles Parsons) on Electric Power Supply. The committee were asked to submit general comments or suggestions on the broad administrative and commercial issues which had arisen out of the Williamson Report. The Birchenough Committee generally agreed with the Williamson Report but recommended that generation and transmission should be a single unified system with state regulation and finance and that means should be found for including distribution as well. This recommendation was very far-sighted but considered too ambitious by the government. If acted upon it would have anticipated the Electricity Act 1947 by 28 years.

Parliament rejected what would have been the effective nationalisation of the industry but enacted two of the committee's recommendations in a weaker form, including the setting up Electricity Commissioners and a number of joint electricity authorities formed by the electricity suppliers in each area.

The Electricity (Supply) Act 1919, was based essentially on the Williamson and Birchenough reports and introduced central co-ordination by establishing the Electricity Commissioners, an official body responsible for securing reorganisation on a regional basis.

=== Operations ===
In 1925 the commissioners approved a system for the standardisation of electricity supply. The generation and distribution of electricity was undertaken at a range of voltages and frequencies; 109 suppliers provided AC only, 297 DC only, and 176 both AC and DC. Supply voltages ranged from 100 V to >3,000 V. AC was supplied at 15 different frequencies ranging from 25 Hz to 100 Hz, even at the most common frequency of 50 Hz (supplied by 223 undertakings) some provided single phase, some two-phase and some three-phase. The standard proposed by the commissioners was three-phase AC of 6.6 kV (or 11 kV, 33 kV, 49.5 kV or 66 kV). Lower voltages could be DC or AC. Frequency was to be 50 Hz ± 2.5%.

The Electricity Commissioners published standards and guidance for electricity installations and reports on conferences and strategic policies for the industry (see Publications section).

The Electricity Commissioners recognised that their activities had met with limited success, they were involved in many public inquiries and negotiations between electricity undertakings. Their powers of compulsion had been removed from the 1919 Electricity Bill and the period 1920 to 1926 has been characterised as a diagnosis of failure. Some of these issues were addressed by the Weir Committee in 1925 which led to the Electricity (Supply) Act 1926 and the establishment of the Central Electricity Board. The CEB operated alongside the Electricity Commissioners until both were abolished upon nationalisation of the electricity industry on 1 April 1948.

Section 58 of the Electricity Act 1947 gave the Minister the power to dissolve the Electricity Commissioners. The Electricity Commissioners existed for some years after nationalisation, and finally closed in 1953.

=== Location ===
The Electricity Commission was located at Gwydyr House, Whitehall, London SW1 in 1921, and at Savoy Court, Strand, London WC2 in 1939.

== Joint electricity authorities ==
Four joint electricity authorities were established after the Electricity (Supply) Act 1922 had empowered then to borrow money to finance electricity schemes.

== Key people ==
The first five Electricity Commissioners were:

- Sir John Francis Cleverton Snell, (Chairman) February 1920 – 1938. During his chairmanship the Central Electricity Board and the National Grid were established.
- H. Booth, Principal Clerk to the Board of Trade, February 1920–?.
- William Walker Lackie (1869–1945), Glasgow Corporation Electricity Department, February 1920 – 1934.
- Sir Archibald Page (1875–1949), February 1920–1925.
- Sir Harry Haward (1863–1953), February 1920–March 1930.

The Secretary of the Commission was Reginald Thomas George French (1881–1965), 1920–January 1945.

=== Later appointments ===
- Sir John Macfarlane Kennedy (1879–1954), Deputy Chairman 1938–47, Chairman 1947–8, 1933–48.
- Sir (Standen) Leonard Pearce (1873–1947), May 1925–October 1926 and 1940–1945.
- T.P. Wilmshurst, November 1926–July 1935.
- Sir John Reeve Brooke (1880–1937), Deputy Chairman, March 1929–April 1937.
- Charles George Morley New (d.1957), April 1935 – 1948.
- Sir Cyril William Hurcomb (1883–1975), chairman from late 1937, June 1937 – 1948.
- Henry Nimmo (1885–1954), June 1945 – 1948.

The Secretary of the Commission was Mr A. E. Marson, January 1945 – March 1948.

== Publications ==
The Electricity Commissioners published the following reports, standards and guidance material:

- Annual Report of the Electricity Commissioners (1920–1947)
- Regulations relating to Extra High Voltage, ELC. 13 (1920)
- Return of engineering and financial statistics relating to authorised undertakings in Great Britain (annual, 1923–1947)
- Overhead Line Regulations, ELC. 39 (1924)
- Electricity Supply Regulations, ELC.38 (1925)
- Report of the Advisory Committee on Domestic Supplies of Electricity and Methods of Charge (1927)
- Report of Proceedings of Conference on Electricity Supply in Rural Areas (1928)
- Overhead Line Regulations, ELC. 53 (1928)
- Report on Assisted Wiring and the Hiring and Hire-purchase of Electrical Apparatus (1930)
- Report on Uniformity of Electricity Charges and Tariffs (1930)
- Rural Electrification: Bedford Scheme (1930)
- Rural Electrification: Norwich Scheme (1931)
- Statement by Minister of Transport at Conferences with Electricity Undertakers 1931 (1931)
- Report on the measures which have been taken in this country. and in others, to obviate the emission of soot, ash, grit and gritty particles from the chimneys of electric power stations by a committee appointed by the Commissioners (1932)
- Electricity Supply (Meters) Act 1936 Explanatory Memorandum (1937)
- Electricity Supply (Meters) Act 1936 Approved Apparatus for Testing Stations (1937)
- Electricity Supply Regulations (1937)

== See also ==
- Timeline of the UK electricity supply industry
- List of pre-nationalisation UK electric power companies
- Electricity (Supply) Act 1919
- Electricity Act 1947
- Joint Electricity Authority
