= SP Manweb =

SP Manweb plc
- Company type: Private
- Industry: Electricity generation, transmission, distribution
- Founded: 1947 (as MANWEB); 1996 (as SP Manweb plc)
- Headquarters: United Kingdom
- Products: Electricity
- Parent: Iberdrola
- Website: https://www.spenergynetworks.co.uk/

SP Manweb is the regional electricity distribution network operator (DNO) for Merseyside, north Wales and parts of Cheshire. It is now part of SP Energy Networks, itself a subsidiary of the Spanish energy company Iberdrola.

== Nationalised industry ==
The company was originally created in 1947 as the nationalised Merseyside and North Wales Electricity Board (MANWEB) in the Electricity Act 1947. It was privatised in 1990, when it became become MANWEB plc. MANWEB was responsible for the purchase of electricity from the electricity generator (the Central Electricity Generating Board from 1958) and the distribution and sale of electricity to customers.

The total number of customers supplied by the board was:

MANWEB Customers, 1949–89
Year	1948/9	1960/1	1965/6	1970/1	1975/6	1978/9	1980/1	1985/6	1987/8	1988/9
No. of customers, 1,000s	632	946	1,028	1,099	1,175	1,220	1,246	1,308	1,276	1,285

Electricity, in GWh, sold by MANWEB over its operational life

=== Existing electricity suppliers taken over at nationalisation ===
The Electricity (Allocation of Undertakings to Area Boards) Order 1948 (SI 1948/484) transferred the electricity business of the following local authorities and private companies to the new board effective 31 March 1948.

==== Local authorities ====
- Aberystwyth Corporation
- Bangor Corporation
- Bethesda Urban District Council
- Birkenhead Corporation
- Caernarvon Corporation
- Chester Corporation
- Colwyn Bay Corporation
- Congleton Corporation
- Connah's Quay Urban District Council
- Conway Corporation
- Crewe Corporation
- Dolgelly Urban District Council
- Formby Urban District Council
- Hawarden Rural District Council
- Holyhead Urban District Council
- Hoylake Urban District Council
- Liverpool Corporation
- Llandudno Urban District Council
- Llanfairfechan Urban District Council
- Llangollen Urban District Council
- Menai Bridge Urban District Council
- Mold Urban District Council
- North Wales and South Cheshire Joint Electricity Authority
- Oswestry Corporation
- Penmaenmawr Urban District Council
- Prestatyn Urban District Council
- Rhyl Urban District Council
- Ruthin Corporation
- St. Helen's Corporation
- Southport Corporation
- Wallasey Corporation
- Warrington Corporation
- Wrexham Corporation

==== Private companies ====
- Borth and Ynyslas Electric Supply Company
- Electricity Distribution of North Wales and District Ltd.
- Machynlleth Electric Supply Company
- Mersey Power Company
- Mid-Cheshire Electricity Supply Company
- North Wales Power Company
- Towyn, Aberdovey and District Electricity Company
- Yale Electric Power Company

== Post privatisation ==
The company was purchased by Scottish Power in 1996 and subsequently become SP Manweb plc. The name Manweb continued to be used alongside the Scottish Power logo on home and retail publications until 2007, when it was replaced by ScottishPower. However, the Merseyside, Cheshire and North Wales electricity distributor continues as SP Manweb plc, which is managed, along with the Scottish network operators SP Distribution plc and SP Transmission plc, as SP Energy Networks. A fourth company, SP Power Systems Ltd, maintains the distribution networks for each of these companies.

== See also ==
- Electricity sector in the United Kingdom
