= List of pre-nationalisation UK electric power companies =

The electrical power industry in the United Kingdom was nationalised by the Electricity Act 1947, when over six hundred electric power companies were merged into twelve area boards.

== List of companies ==
=== Companies merged into East Midlands Electricity Board (EMEB) ===
The board's area was defined as: Leicestershire, Northamptonshire, Rutland and parts of Bedfordshire, Buckinghamshire, Derbyshire, Lincolnshire, Nottinghamshire, Staffordshire and Warwickshire.

==== Local authority undertakings ====
- Ashbourne Urban District Council
- Bolsover Urban District Council
- Burton upon Trent Borough Corporation
- Chesterfield Borough Corporation
- Coventry County Borough Corporation
- Derby County Borough Corporation
- East Retford Borough Corporation
- Kettering Borough Corporation
- Leicester County Borough Corporation
- Lincoln County Borough Corporation
- Long Eaton Urban District Council
- Loughborough Borough Corporation
- Mansfield Borough Corporation
- Newark Borough Corporation
- Nottingham County Borough Corporation
- Nuneaton Borough Corporation
- Rugby Borough Corporation
- Sleaford Urban District Council
- Spalding Urban District Council
- Uttoxeter Urban District Council
- Worksop Borough Corporation

==== Private companies ====
- Boston and District Electric Supply Company (records from 1923)
- Derbyshire and Nottinghamshire Electric Power Company (records from 1901)
- Leicestershire and Warwickshire Electric Power Company (records from 1904)
- Melton Mowbray Electric Light Company (records from 1899)
- Midland Electric Light and Power Company Limited (formed c.1881)
- Mid Lincolnshire Electric Supply Company Limited (records from 1936)
- Northampton Electric Light & Power Co Ltd (records from 1936)
- Oakham Gas and Electricity Company Limited (records from 1917)
- Rushden and District Electric Supply Company Limited (records from 1945)
- Tamworth District Electric Supply Company (records from 1930)
- Urban Electric Supply Company
- Wellingborough Electric Supply Company Limited (records from 1900)
- W.J. Furse and Company Limited (records from 1912) (Note: Not listed in the Electricity (Allocation of Undertakings to Area Boards) Order 1948, presumably had ceased before this date.)

=== Companies merged into Eastern Electricity Board (EEB) ===
The board's area was defined as: Cambridgeshire, Hertfordshire, Huntingdonshire, the Isle of Ely, Norfolk, Suffolk and parts of Bedfordshire, Buckinghamshire, Essex, Middlesex, Oxfordshire and the Soke of Peterborough.

==== Local authority undertakings ====
- Aylesbury Borough Corporation
- Bedford Borough Corporation
- Clacton Urban District Council
- Colchester Borough Corporation
- East Dereham Urban District Council
- Felixstowe Urban District Council
- Finchley Borough Corporation
- Great Yarmouth County Borough Corporation
- Harwich Borough Corporation
- Hertford Borough Corporation
- Hitchin Urban District Council
- Hornsey Borough Corporation
- Ipswich County Borough Corporation
- King's Lynn Borough Corporation
- Lowestoft Borough Corporation
- Luton Borough Corporation
- Norwich County Borough Corporation (founded 1893 as Norwich Electricity Company; transferred to Electricity Committee of Norwich Corporation in 1902)
- Peterborough City Corporation
- Southend-on-Sea County Borough Corporation
- Thurrock Urban District Council
- Watford Borough Corporation

==== Private companies ====
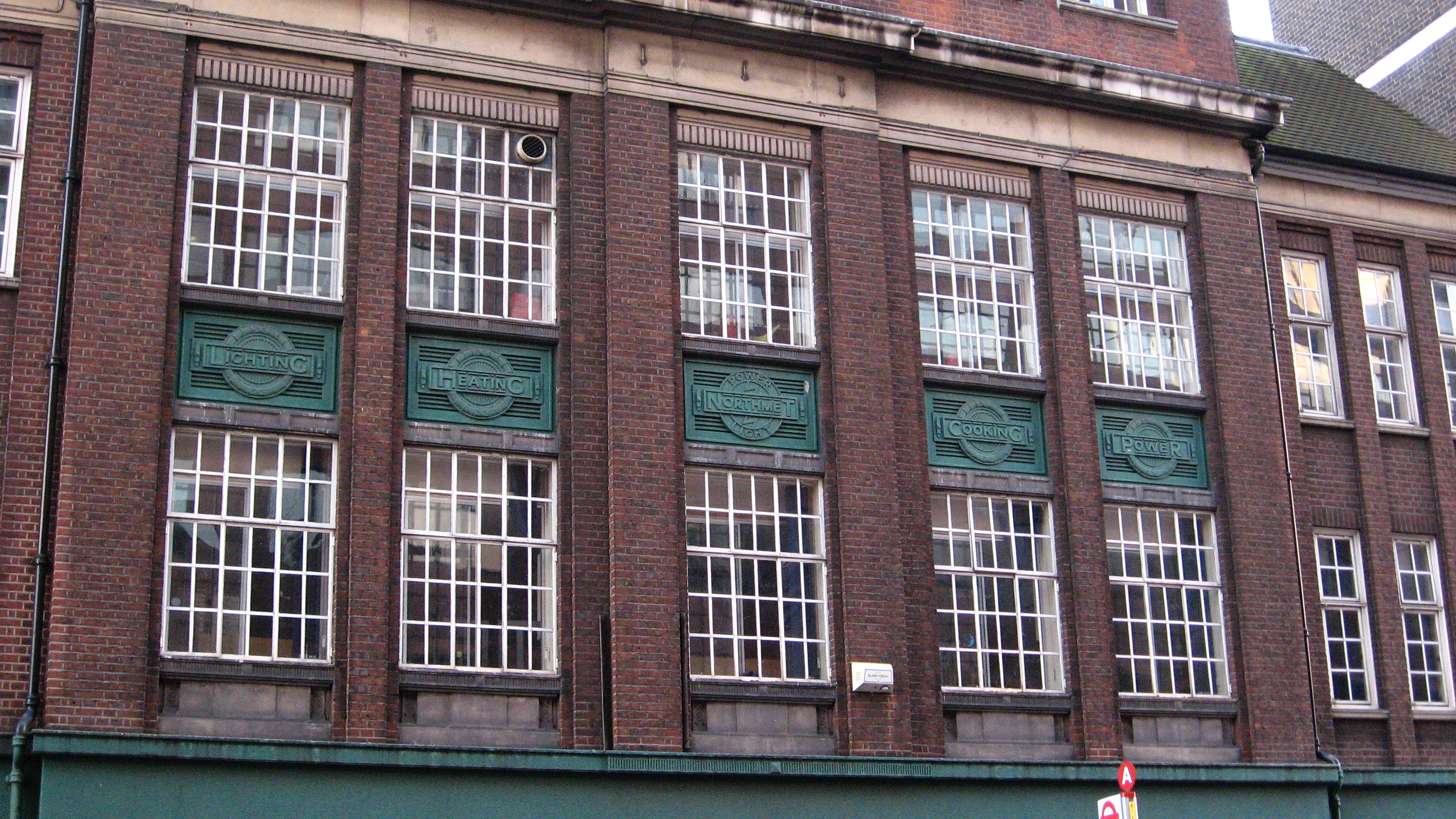
The Northmet Power and Light building in Wood Green, north London

- Aldeburgh Electric Supply Company
- Bedfordshire, Cambridgeshire and Huntingdonshire Electricity Company
- Brentwood District Electric Company
- Bungay Gas and Electricity Co Ltd (formed 1926)
- Cambridge Electric Supply Company
- Chesham Electric Light and Power Company
- Colne Valley Electric Supply Company
- East Anglian Electric Supply Company (incorporating Bury St Edmunds Corporation)
- East Suffolk Electricity Distribution Company
- Frinton-on-Sea & District Electric Light and Power Company
- Letchworth Electricity Limited
- Newmarket Electric Light Company
- North Metropolitan Electric Power Supply Company ("Northmet") – based in Wood Green, N22
- Northwood Electric Light and Power Company
- Welwyn Garden City Electricity Supply Company
- Wickford and District Electricity Supply Company
- Wisbech Electric Light and Power Company

=== Companies merged into London Electricity Board (LEB) ===
The board's area was defined as: The administrative County of London and parts of Essex, Kent, Middlesex and Surrey.

==== Local authority undertakings ====
- Barking Borough Corporation
- Barnes Borough Corporation
- Battersea Borough Council
- Beckenham Borough Corporation
- Bermondsey Borough Council
- Bethnal Green Borough Council
- Bexley Borough Corporation
- Bromley Borough Corporation
- Dartford Borough Corporation
- East Ham County Borough Corporation
- Erith Borough Corporation
- Fulham Borough Council
- Hackney Borough Council
- Hammersmith Borough Council
- Hampstead Borough Council (1894)
- Ilford Borough Corporation
- Islington Borough Council
- Leyton Borough Corporation
- Poplar Borough Council
- St Marylebone Borough Council
- St Pancras Borough Council
- Shoreditch Borough Council
- Southwark Borough Council
- Stepney Borough Council
- Stoke Newington Borough Council
- Walthamstow Borough Corporation
- West Ham County Borough Corporation (West Ham Electricity Board)
- Willesden Borough Corporation
- Wimbledon Borough Corporation
- Woolwich Borough Council

==== Joint electricity authority ====
Created under the provisions of the Electricity (Supply) Act 1919

- London and Home Counties Joint Electricity Authority – established in 1925. Upon nationalisation its assets were split between the South Eastern Electricity Board, the Eastern Electricity Board and the London Electricity Board.

==== Private companies ====
- Brompton and Kensington Electricity Supply Company – formed January 1889 as the House to House Electric Supply Company, changed its name August 1890, generating station at Richmond Road Brompton, part of the London Power Company
- Central Electric Supply Company, part of the London Power Company, wound up on 25 October 1932
- Central London Electricity Limited (formerly Charing Cross Company)
- Charing Cross Electricity Supply Company – originated from a company called the Electric Supply Corporation Limited formed in 1889 with a capital of £100,000, this changed its name to the Charing Cross and Strand Electricity Supply Corporation, generating stations at Maiden Lane, Commercial Road Lambeth, Bow station, part of the London Power Company
- Chelsea Electricity Supply Company – formed 1886; generating station at Draycott Place / Cadogan Gardens and Flood Street; took over the Cadogan Electric Lighting Company (formed in March 1887 with a capital of £30,000, generating station at Manor Street near the Albert Bridge, went into liquidation in February 1891), Cadogan Company taken over by the New Cadogan and Belgravia Electric Supply Company (registered 30 June 1890), the latter company changed its name to St Luke's Chelsea Electric Lighting Company on 6 July 1892, in December 1892 the St Luke's Company purchased the assets of the Cadogan Company for £4,250 in cash and £4,500 in shares, assets transferred to the Chelsea Electric Supply Company for £10,250 on 5 April 1893, part of the London Power Company, taken over by Charing Cross Co 1937
- Chislehurst Electric Supply Company
- City of London Electric Lighting Company – formed July 1891 from the Pioneer company, generating stations at Bankside and Wool Quay Member of the No. 1 group of undertakings.
- County of London Electric Supply Company – formed June 1891 with a capital of £100,000, generating stations at City Road Basin Regent's Canal, and Wandsworth; renamed the County of London and Brush Provincial Electric Lighting Company in 1894 Member of the No. 1 group of undertakings.
- Foots Cray Electricity Supply Company
- Hampstead Electric Supply Company Ltd (records from 1898) (Note: The Hampstead vestry (predecessor to the borough council) established an electricity supply business in 1894, and this company may have been acquired by them, or never have become active.)
- Kensington and Knightsbridge Electric Lighting Company – formed March 1888 with a capital of £250,000, took over the Kensington Court Electric Light Company (itself formed 1886 with capital of £10,000), generating stations at High Street Kensington and Cheval Place, Wood Lane Shepherds Bush (joint enterprise with Notting Hill Electric Lighting Company), part of the London Power Company
- London Associated Electricity Undertakings Limited formed in 1935 to acquire, combine and coordinate the electricity distribution interests of six west London electricity companies.
- London Electric Supply Corporation (LESCo) – formed in 1887 out of Grosvenor Gallery Electric Supply Corporation, London's first commercial electric power supplier, part of the London Power Company
- London Power Company
- Metropolitan Electric Supply Company – formed as South Metropolitan Electric Supply Company in November 1887 with capital of £250,000, 'South' dropped from title in July 1888, generating stations at Whitehall Court, Rathbone Place, Sardinia Street, Manchester Square, Amberley Road, Acton Lane Willesden, part of the London Power Company January 1927
- Notting Hill Electric Lighting Company – formed February 1888 with a capital of £100,000, generating station at Bulmer Place and Wood Lane Shepherds Bush (joint venture with Kensington and Knightsbridge Electric Lighting Company), part of the London Power Company
- St James' and Pall Mall Electric Lighting Company – formed March 1888, began supplies April 1889 from a generating station in Mason's Yard Duke Street, this later converted to a sub-station for bulk supplies from Grove Road, part of the London Power Company
- South London Electric Supply Corporation – formed in December 1896 with a capital of £325,000, to supply the Borough of Lambeth. A generating station was built at Loughborough Junction, decommissioned in 1929 after which the Corporation took bulk supplies from other members of the No.1 group.
- South Metropolitan Electric Light and Power Company – established in 1904 upon the amalgamation of the Crystal Palace District Electric Supply Company and the Blackheath and Greenwich District Electric Light Company. Built Blackwall Point power station. Member of the No. 1 group of undertakings.
- Westminster Electric Supply Corporation – formed June 1888 with a capital of £100,000, generating stations at Dacre Street Victoria, St John's Wharf Millbank, Eccleston Place and Davies Street, took over supply of Westminster Electrical Syndicate, part of the London Power Company

=== Companies merged into Merseyside and North Wales Electricity Board (MANWEB) ===
The board's area was defined as: Anglesey, Caernarvonshire, Denbighshire, Flintshire, Merionethshire, Montgomeryshire and parts of Cardiganshire, Cheshire, Lancashire (including Liverpool) and Shropshire.

==== Local authority undertakings ====
- Aberystwyth Borough Corporation
- Bangor City Corporation
- Bethesda Urban District Council
- Birkenhead County Borough Corporation
- Caernarvon Borough Corporation
- Chester County Borough Corporation
- Colwyn Bay Borough Corporation
- Congleton Borough Corporation
- Connah's Quay Urban District Council
- Conway Borough Corporation
- Crewe Borough Corporation
- Dolgelly Urban District Council
- Formby Urban District Council
- Hawarden Rural District Council
- Holyhead Urban District Council
- Hoylake Urban District Council
- Liverpool County Borough Corporation
- Llandudno Urban District Council
- Llanfairfechan Urban District Council
- Llangollen Urban District Council
- Menai Bridge Urban District Council
- Mold Urban District Council
- Oswestry Borough Corporation
- Penmaenmawr Urban District Council
- Prestatyn Urban District Council
- Rhyl Urban District Council
- Ruthin Borough Corporation
- St Helens County Borough Corporation
- Southport County Borough Corporation
- Wallasey County Borough Corporation
- Warrington County Borough Corporation
- Wrexham Borough Corporation

==== Joint electricity authority ====
Created under the provisions of the Electricity (Supply) Act 1919

- North Wales and South Cheshire Joint Electricity Authority (records from 1923).

==== Private companies ====
- Borth and Ynyslas Electric Supply Company
- Electricity Distribution of North Wales and District Limited
- Machynlleth Electric Supply Company
- Mersey Power Company
- Mid-Cheshire Electricity Supply Company
- North Wales Power Company
- Towyn, Aberdovey and District Electricity Company
- Yale Electric Power Company

=== Companies merged into Midlands Electricity Board (MEB) ===
The board's area was defined as: Herefordshire, Worcestershire and parts of Gloucestershire, Oxfordshire, Shropshire, Staffordshire and Warwickshire (including Birmingham).

==== Local authority undertakings ====
- Birmingham County Borough Corporation
- Cannock Urban District Council
- Cheltenham Borough Corporation
- Gloucester County Borough Corporation
- Leek Urban District Council
- Lichfield City Corporation
- Malvern Urban District Council
- Newcastle-under-Lyme Borough Corporation
- Stafford Borough Corporation
- Stoke-on-Trent County Borough Corporation
- Stone Urban District Council
- Sutton Coldfield Borough Corporation
- Walsall County Borough Corporation
- Warmley Rural District Council
- West Bromwich County Borough Corporation
- Wolverhampton County Borough Corporation
- Worcester County Borough Corporation

==== Joint electricity authorities ====
Created under the provisions of the Electricity (Supply) Act 1919

- North West Midlands Joint Electricity Authority – created 1928.
- West Midlands Joint Electricity Authority – created 1925.

==== Private companies ====
- Chasetown and District Electricity Company
- Market Drayton Electric Light and Power Company Limited
- Midland Electric Corporation for Power Distribution
- Shropshire, Worcestershire and Staffordshire Electric Power Company
- Stroud Electric Supply Company
- Thornbury and District Electricity Company
- West Gloucestershire Power Company

=== Companies merged into North Eastern Electricity Board (NEEB) ===
The board's area was defined as: Durham, Northumberland, the North Riding of Yorkshire and parts of the East and West Ridings of Yorkshire (including York).

==== Local authority undertakings ====
- Amble Urban District Council
- Crook and Willington Urban District Council
- Darlington County Borough Corporation
- Eston Urban District Council
- Guisborough Urban District Council
- Harrogate Borough Corporation
- Middlesbrough County Borough Corporation
- Redcar Borough Corporation
- Richmond (Yorks) Borough Corporation
- Scarborough Borough Corporation
- Seaham Urban District Council
- Skelton and Brotton Urban District Council
- South Shields County Borough Corporation
- Stanley Urban District Council
- Stockton-on-Tees Borough Corporation
- Sunderland County Borough Corporation
- Tynemouth County Borough Corporation
- West Hartlepool Borough Corporation
- Whitby Urban District Council
- York County Borough Corporation

==== Private companies ====
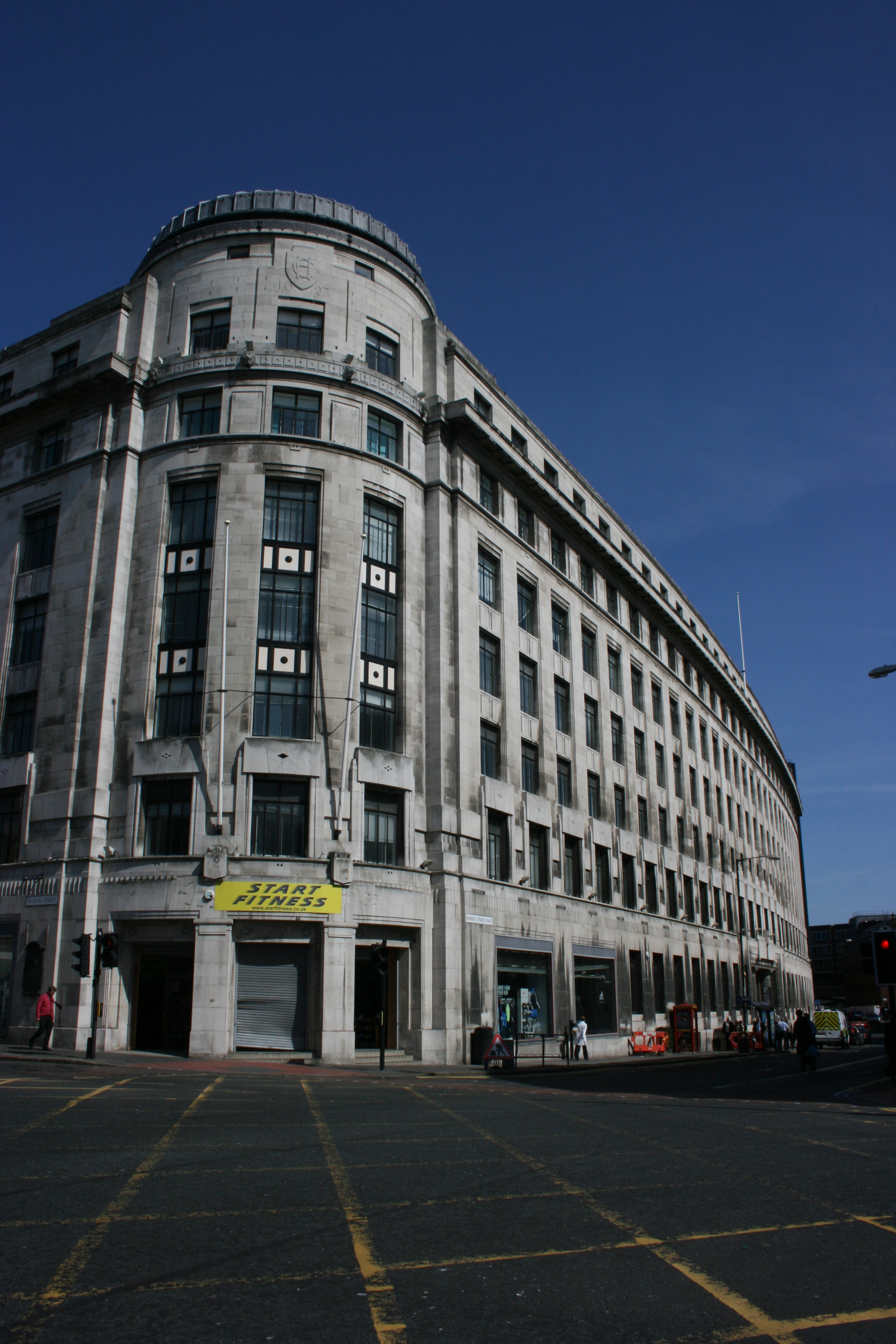
Carliol House, former headquarters of the Newcastle-upon-Tyne Electric Supply Company

- Askrigg and Reeth Electric Supply Company
- Cleveland and Durham County Electric Power Company
- Cleveland and Durham Electric Power Limited
- County of Durham Electrical Power Distribution Company
- County of Durham Power Supply Company
- Durham Collieries Electric Power Company
- Durham County Electric Power Company
- Hawes Electric Lighting Company
- Hexham and District Supply Company
- Houghton le Spring and District Electric Lighting Company
- Northern Counties Electricity Supply Company
- Tees Power Station Company
- Newcastle and District Electric Lighting Company
- North Eastern Electric Supply Company Limited (NESCo; formed in 1889 as Newcastle-upon-Tyne Electric Supply Company Ltd.) – built a large AC network pioneered by engineer Charles Merz

=== Companies merged into North Western Electricity Board (NORWEB) ===
The board's area was defined as: Cumberland, Westmorland and parts of Cheshire, Derbyshire, Lancashire (including Manchester) and of the West Riding of Yorkshire.

==== Local authority undertakings ====
- Accrington Borough Corporation
- Alderley Edge and Wilmslow Electricity Board
- Ashton-in-Makerfield Urban District Council
- Ashton-under-Lyne Borough Corporation
- Atherton Urban District Council
- Bacup Borough Corporation
- Barrow-in-Furness County Borough Corporation (1899)
- Blackburn County Borough Corporation
- Blackpool County Borough Corporation
- Bolton County Borough Corporation
- Bredbury and Romiley Urban District Council
- Brierfield Urban District Council
- Burnley County Borough Corporation
- Bury County Borough Corporation
- Buxton Borough Corporation
- Carlisle County Borough Corporation (1899)
- Cheadle and Gatley Urban District Council
- Clitheroe Borough Corporation
- Colne Borough Corporation
- Darwen Borough Corporation
- Eccles Borough Corporation
- Farnworth Borough Corporation
- Fleetwood Borough Corporation
- Grange Urban District Council (1912)
- Haslingden Borough Corporation
- Hazel Grove and Bramhall Urban District Council
- Heywood Borough Corporation
- Hindley Urban District Council
- Horwich Urban District Council
- Kendal Borough Corporation (1902)
- Lancaster City Corporation
- Leigh Borough Corporation
- Littleborough Urban District Council
- Lytham St Anne's Borough Corporation
- Macclesfield Borough Corporation
- Manchester Corporation Electricity Department
- Marple Urban District Council
- Middleton Borough Corporation
- Millom Rural District Council – Millom Urban District Council (1927) absorbed by RDC in 1934
- Milnrow Urban District Council
- Morecambe and Heysham Borough Corporation
- Nelson Borough Corporation
- New Mills Urban District Council
- Newton-le-Willows Urban District Council
- Oldham County Borough Corporation
- Padiham Urban District Council
- Preston County Borough Corporation
- Radcliffe Borough Corporation
- Rawtenstall Borough Corporation
- Rochdale County Borough Corporation
- Sale Borough Corporation
- Salford County Borough Corporation
- Stalybridge, Hyde, Mossley & Dukinfield Transport & Electricity Board (Note: Only the electricity supply business was transferred, the SHMD board continued to operate public transport services.)
- Stockport County Borough Corporation
- Stretford and District Electricity Board
- Swinton and Pendlebury Borough Corporation
- Thornton Cleveleys Urban District Council
- Turton Urban District Council
- Ulverston Urban District Council (1926)
- Whitehaven Borough Corporation (1893)
- Whitworth Urban District Council
- Wigan County Borough Corporation
- Workington Borough Corporation (1925)

==== Private companies ====
- Altrincham Electric Supply Limited
- Cark and District Electricity Company (1918)
- Keswick Electric Light Company (1890)
- Lancashire Electric Power Company
- Mid-Cumberland Electricity Company (1932)
- Ormskirk Electric Supply Company
- Penrith Electricity Supply Company (1909)
- Sedbergh Electricity Supply Company (originally J.J. Martin & Co.) (1922)
- Settle and District Electricity Company
- South Cumberland Electricity Supply Company (originally Cumberland Waste Heat Owners Co. Ltd) (1924)
- Trent Valley and High Peak Electricity Company
- Westmorland and District Electricity Supply Company (1933)
- Windermere and District Electricity Supply Company (originally R.H. Fell & Son Ltd.) (1893)

=== Companies merged into South East Scotland Electricity Board ===
The board's area was defined as: Berwickshire, Clackmannanshire, Fife, Lothians (East Lothian, Midlothian, West Lothian), Peebles, Selkirkshire, and parts of Dunbartonshire, Roxburghshire and Stirlingshire.

==== Local authority undertakings ====
- Borrowstounness Burgh Corporation
- Denny and Dunipace Burgh Corporation
- Edinburgh Corporation (County of the City of Edinburgh)
- Falkirk Burgh Corporation
- Kirkcaldy Burgh Corporation
- North Berwick Burgh Corporation
- Stirling Burgh Corporation
- West Lothian County Council

==== Private companies ====
- Fife Electric Power Company
- Lothians Electric Power Company
- Musselburgh and District Electric Light and Traction Company (Note: Musselburgh and District's trams were taken over by Edinburgh Corporation in 1928, although the company's name was not changed to reflect this.)
- Scottish Central Electric Power Company
- Scottish Midlands Electricity Supply Limited
- Scottish Power Company Limited
- Scottish Southern Electric Supply Company

=== Companies merged into South Eastern Electricity Board (SEEBOARD) ===
The board's area was defined as: Parts of Kent, Middlesex, Surrey and Sussex.

==== Local authority undertakings ====
- Ashford Urban District Council
- Bexhill Borough Corporation
- Brighton County Borough Corporation
- Canterbury County Borough Corporation
- Croydon County Borough Corporation
- Dover Borough Corporation
- Eastbourne County Borough Corporation
- East Grinstead Urban District Council
- Epsom and Ewell Borough Corporation
- Faversham Borough Corporation
- Gillingham Borough Corporation
- Gravesend Borough Corporation
- Guildford Borough Corporation
- Hastings County Borough Corporation
- Horsham Urban District Council
- Hove Borough Corporation
- Kingston upon Thames Borough Corporation
- Maidstone Borough Corporation
- Margate, Broadstairs and District Electricity Board
- Reigate Borough Corporation
- Tonbridge Urban District Council
- Tunbridge Wells Borough Corporation
- Walton and Weybridge Urban District Council
- Worthing Borough Corporation

==== Joint electricity authority ====
Created under the provisions of the Electricity (Supply) Act 1919

- London and Home Counties Joint Electricity Authority

==== Private companies ====
- Burgess Hill Electricity Limited
- Central Sussex Electricity Limited
- Folkestone Electricity Supply Company
- Guildford Gas Light and Coke Company
- Herne Bay and District Electricity Supply Company
- Horley and District Electricity Supply Company
- Kent Electric Power Company
- Lewes and District Electric Supply Company
- Peacehaven Electric Light and Power Company
- Ramsgate and District Electric Supply Company
- Richmond (Surrey) Electric Light and Power Company
- Ringmer and District Electricity Company
- Seaford and Newhaven Electricity Limited
- Sevenoaks and District Electricity Company
- Sheerness and District Electric Supply Company
- Shoreham and District Electric Lighting and Power Company
- South-East Kent Electric Power Company
- Steyning Electricity Limited
- Sussex Electricity Supply Company
- Uckfield Gas and Electricity Company
- Weald Electricity Supply Company
- West Kent Electric Company
- Whistable Electric Company
- Woking Electric Supply Company

=== Companies merged into South Wales Electricity Board (SWALEB) ===
The board's area was defined as: Brecknockshire, Carmarthenshire, Glamorganshire, Monmouthshire, Pembrokeshire, Radnorshire and part of Cardiganshire.

==== Local authority undertakings ====
- Aberdare Urban District Council
- Abertillery Urban District Council
- Ammanford Urban District Council
- Barry Borough Corporation
- Bedwas and Machen Urban District Council
- Bedwellty Urban District Council
- Bridgend Urban District Council
- Caerphilly Urban District Council
- Cardiff County Borough Corporation
- Cardiff Rural District Council
- Cwmbran Urban District Council
- Ebbw Vale Urban District Council
- Gellygaer Urban District Council
- Llandrindod Wells Urban District Council
- Maesteg Urban District Council
- Milford Haven Urban District Council
- Mountain Ash Urban District Council
- Mynyddislwyn Urban District Council
- Neath Borough Corporation
- Neath Rural District Council
- Newport County Borough Corporation (Mon.)
- Ogmore and Garw Urban District Council
- Penarth Urban District Council
- Penybont Rural District Council
- Pontardawe Rural District Council
- Pontypridd Urban District Council
- Port Talbot Borough Corporation
- Rhondda Urban District Council
- Risca Urban District Council
- Swansea County Borough Corporation
- Tredegar Urban District Council

==== Private companies ====
- Aberayron and District Electricity Supply and Power Company
- Carmarthen Electric Supply Company
- Chepstow Electric Lighting and Power Company
- Gorseinon Electric Light Company
- Llanelly and District Electric Supply Company (Note: Llanelly and District's trolleybus operation was sold to British Electric Traction in 1952.)
- Merthyr Electric Traction and Lighting Company
- Monmouth Electricity Company
- Pontypool Electric Light and Power Company
- Porthcawl Electricity Company
- South Wales Electric Power Company
- South Wales Power Station Company Limited
- West Cambrian Power Company

=== Companies merged into South West Scotland Electricity Board ===
The board's area was defined as: Ayrshire, Dumfries-shire, Glasgow, Kirkcudbrightshire, Lanarkshire, Renfrewshire, Wigtownshire and parts of Dunbartonshire, Roxburghshire and Stirlingshire.

==== Local authority undertakings ====
- Airdrie Burgh Corporation
- Ayrshire Electricity Board
- Coatbridge Burgh Corporation
- Dumbarton Burgh Corporation (assets owned by Electric Supply Corporation Limited)
- Dumfries Burgh Corporation
- Dumfriesshire County Council
- Dunbartonshire County Council
- Glasgow Corporation (County of the City of Glasgow)
- Greenock Burgh Corporation
- Hamilton Burgh Corporation
- Helensburgh Burgh Corporation
- Kirkcudbright County Council
- Lanarkshire County Council
- Motherwell and Wishaw Burgh Corporation
- Paisley Burgh Corporation

==== Private companies ====
- Clyde Valley Electrical Power Company
- Electric Supply Corporation Limited
- Galloway Water Power Company
- Lanarkshire Hydro Electric Power Company
- Skelmorlie Electric Supply Company
- Strathclyde Electricity Supply Company
- Wigtownshire Electricity Company

=== Companies merged into South Western Electricity Board (SWEB) ===
The board's area was defined as: Cornwall (including the Isles of Scilly), Devonshire and parts of Dorsetshire, Gloucestershire (including Bristol) and Somersetshire.

==== Local authority undertakings ====
- Barnstaple Borough Corporation
- Bath County Borough Corporation
- Bridport Borough Corporation
- Bristol County Borough Corporation
- Exeter County Borough Corporation
- Lyme Regis Borough Corporation
- Plymouth County Borough Corporation
- Plympton St Mary Rural District Council
- Taunton Borough Corporation
- Tiverton Borough Corporation
- Torquay Borough Corporation

==== Private companies ====
- Bideford and District Electricity Supply Company
- Bridgwater and District Electric Supply & Traction Company
- Brixham Gas and Electricity Company
- Bude Electric Supply Company
- Burnham and District Electric Supply Company
- Chudleigh Electric Light and Power Company
- Cornwall Electric Power Company
- Culm Valley Electric Supply Company
- Dawlish Electric Light and Power Company
- East Devon Electricity Company
- Exe Valley Electricity Company
- Holsworthy Electric Supply Company
- Ilfracombe Electric Light and Power Company
- Lynton and Lynmouth Electric Light Company
- Mid-Somerset Electric Supply Company
- Minehead Electric Supply Company
- North Somerset Electric Supply Company
- Paignton Electric Light and Power Company
- St Austell and District Electric Lighting and Power Company
- Salcombe Gas and Electricity Company
- Seaton and District Electric Light Company
- South Somerset and District Electricity Company
- Teignmouth Electric Lighting Company
- Wellington District Electricity Company
- West Devon Electric Supply Company
- West of England Electric Investments Limited
- Weston-super-Mare and District Electric Supply Company

=== Companies merged into Southern Electricity Board (SEB) ===
The board's area was defined as: Berkshire, Hampshire, the Isle of Wight, Wiltshire and parts of Buckinghamshire, Dorsetshire, Gloucestershire, Middlesex, Oxfordshire, Somersetshire, Surrey and Sussex.

==== Local authority undertakings ====
- Aldershot Borough Corporation
- Basingstoke Borough Corporation
- Bournemouth County Borough Corporation
- Brentford and Chiswick Borough Corporation
- Calne Borough Corporation
- Chichester City Corporation
- Dorchester Borough Corporation
- Ealing Borough Corporation
- Fareham Urban District Council
- Heston and Isleworth Borough Corporation
- High Wycombe Borough Corporation
- Maidenhead Borough Corporation
- Marlborough Borough Corporation
- Oxford County Borough Corporation
- Portland Urban District Council
- Portsmouth County Borough Corporation
- Reading County Borough Corporation
- Southampton County Borough Corporation
- Swindon Borough Corporation
- Weymouth and Melcombe Regis Borough Corporation
- Winchester City Corporation
- Witney Urban District Council

==== Private companies ====
- Alton District Electricity Company
- Ascot District Gas and Electricity Company (Note: Gas operations passed to North Thames Gas Board)
- Blandford Forum and District Electric Supply Company
- Bognor and District Gas & Electricity Company (Note: Gas operations passed to Southern Gas Board)
- Bournemouth and Poole Electricity Supply Company
- Brentford Electric Supply Company
- Burford Electric Light and Power Company
- Egham and Staines Electricity Company
- Farnham Gas and Electricity Company
- Isle of Wight Electric Light and Power Company
- Metropolitan Electric Supply Company
- Mid Southern Utility Company
- Milford-on-Sea Electric Supply Company
- Milton and Barton-on-Sea (Hants) Electricity Supply Company
- Petersfield Electric Light and Power Company
- Ringwood Electric Supply Company
- Salisbury Electric Light and Supply Company
- Slough & Datchet Electric Supply Company
- Uxbridge & District Electric Supply Company
- Wessex Electricity Company
- West Hampshire Electricity Company
- Whitchurch (Hants) Gas and Electricity Company
- Wilton Electricity Supply Company
- Windsor Electrical Installation Company
- Woodstock and District Electrical Distribution Company
- Yorktown (Camberley) and District Gas and Electricity Company

=== Companies merged into Yorkshire Electricity Board (YEB) ===
The board's area was defined as: Parts of Derbyshire, Lincolnshire, Nottinghamshire and of the East and West Ridings of Yorkshire.

==== Local authority undertakings ====
- Adwick le Street Urban District Council
- Barnoldswick Urban District Council
- Barnsley County Borough Corporation
- Batley Borough Corporation
- Bingley Urban District Council
- Bradford County Borough Corporation
- Bridlington Borough Corporation
- Brighouse Borough Corporation
- Castleford Urban District Council
- Cleethorpes Borough Corporation
- Colne Valley Urban District Council
- Dearne District Electricity Board
- Dewsbury County Borough Corporation
- Doncaster County Borough Corporation
- Earby Urban District Council
- Elland Urban District Council
- Gainsborough Urban District Council
- Grimsby County Borough Corporation
- Halifax County Borough Corporation
- Hebden Royd Urban District Council
- Heckmondwike Urban District Council
- Holmfirth Urban District Council
- Huddersfield County Borough Corporation
- Ilkley Urban District Council
- Keighley Borough Corporation
- Kingston-upon-Hull County Borough Corporation
- Leeds County Borough Corporation
- Louth Borough Corporation
- Mexborough Urban District Council
- Mirfield Urban District Council
- Morley - Borough Corporation
- Normanton Urban District Council
- Ossett Borough Corporation
- Pudsey Borough Corporation
- Rotherham County Borough Corporation
- Scunthorpe Borough Corporation
- Sheffield County Borough Corporation
- Shipley Urban District Council
- Skipton Urban District Council
- Spenborough Urban District Council
- Todmorden Borough Corporation
- Wakefield County Borough Corporation

==== Private companies ====
- Buckrose Light and Power Company
- Craven Hydro-Electric Supply Company
- Electrical Distribution of Yorkshire Limited
- North Lincolnshire and Howdenshire Electricity Company
- Pontefract Electricity Company
- South East Yorkshire Light and Power Company
- Tadcaster Electricity Company
- Yorkshire Electric Power Company

=== Other companies ===
The following companies had interests in multiple and non-contiguous locations.

- British Power and Light Corporation – founded 1929 acquired a controlling interest in undertakings in North Wales; East Suffolk; South Somerset; Trent Valley; West Hampshire; and Ringwood
- Christy Brothers and Company Limited – founded 1883 as electrical contractors, applied for or acquired electricity undertakings: Crediton, Holsworthy, Aldeburgh, Pateley Bridge, Portishead, Mid-Somerset, North Somerset, West Devon, Street.
- Edmundsons Electricity Corporation – founded in 1897 built generating stations and electricity supply systems (electricity undertakings) in Folkestone; Winchester; Salisbury; Ventnor; and Shrewsbury; and acquired further electricity company franchises
- Electrical Finance and Securities Company Limited – incorporated in June 1914 to finance and control undertakings. In 1927 had interests in Colne Valley; Northwood; Foots Cray; Lothians; and Boston
- Midland Counties Electric Supply Company Limited see Midland Electric Light and Power Company Limited. Originally formed in 1912 as Tramways Light and Power Company Limited, owned (in 1921) the Leicestershire and Warwickshire Electric Power Company; Midland Electric Light and Power Company Limited; Cheltenham and District Light Railway Company; Derbyshire and Nottinghamshire Electric Power Company; Leamington and Warwick Electrical Company Limited; Nottinghamshire and Derbyshire Tramways Company.

== See also ==
- Electricity Act 1947 (10 & 11 Geo. 6. c. 54)
