= Eastern Electricity =

Former electricity supply and distribution utility serving Eastern England

Eastern Electricity plc
- Type: Public limited company
- Industry: Energy
- Founded: 1948
- Defunct: 1995
- Fate: Acquired
- Successor: Texas Utilities
- Headquarters: Wherstead Park, England, United Kingdom

Eastern Electricity plc was an electricity supply and distribution utility serving Eastern England, including East Anglia and part of Greater London. It was renamed Eastern Group under which name it was listed on the London Stock Exchange and was a constituent of the FTSE 100 Index until it was acquired by Hanson plc in 1995, before being purchased by Texas Utilities in 1998.

== Eastern Electricity Board ==
The Eastern Electricity Board (EEB) was formed in 1948 as part of the nationalisation of the electricity industry by the Electricity Act 1947. The board was responsible for the purchase of electricity from the electricity generator (the Central Electricity Generating Board from 1958) and its distribution and sale of electricity to customers.

The key people on the board were: Chairman H. D. B. Wood (1964, 1967), Deputy Chairman C. C. Hill (1964, 1967), full-time member P. Sydney (1964) J. S. Mills (1967).

The total number of customers supplied by the Eastern Electricity Board was:

Eastern Electricity Board customers 1949–89
Year	1948/9	1960/1	1965/6	1970/1	1975/6	1978/9	1980/1	1985/6	1987/8	1988/9
No. of customers, 1,000s	1,180	1,835	2,041	2,244	2,430	2,561	2,623	2,782	2,864	2,905

Electricity, in GWh, sold by the Eastern Electricity Board over its operational life

=== Existing electricity suppliers taken over at nationalisation ===
The Electricity (Allocation of Undertakings to Area Boards) Order 1948 (SI 1948/484) transferred the electricity business of the following local authorities and private companies to the new board effective 31 March 1948.

==== Local authorities ====
- Aylesbury Corporation
- Bedford Corporation
- Clacton Urban District Council
- Colchester Corporation
- East Dereham Urban District Council
- Felixstowe Urban District Council
- Finchley Corporation
- Great Yarmouth Corporation
- Harwich Corporation
- Hertford Corporation
- Hitchin Urban District Council
- Hornsey Corporation
- Ipswich Corporation
- King's Lynn Corporation
- Lowestoft Corporation
- Luton Corporation
- Norwich Corporation
- Peterborough Corporation
- Southend-on-Sea Corporation
- Thurrock Urban District Council
- Watford Corporation

==== Private companies ====
- Aldeburgh Electric Supply Company
- Bedfordshire, Cambridgeshire and Huntingdonshire Electricity Company
- Brentwood District Electric Company
- Bungay Gas and Electricity Company
- Cambridge Electric Supply Company
- Chesham Electric Light and Power Company
- Colne Valley Electric Supply Company
- East Anglian Electric Supply Company
- East Suffolk Electricity Distribution Company
- Frinton-on-Sea and District Electric Light and Power Company
- Letchworth Electricity
- Newmarket Electric Light Company
- Northmet Power Company
- Northwood Electric Light and Power Company
- Welwyn Garden City Electricity Supply Company
- Wickford and District Electricity Supply Company
- Wisbech Electric Light and Power Company

== Eastern Electricity ==
In 1990, the assets of the board passed to Eastern Electricity plc, one of the regional electricity companies formed by the Electricity Act 1989. The company was privatised later in the year in a stock market flotation, one of many UK Government public share offers that saw formerly state-owned utilities sold off, including British Telecom, British Gas, and the UK's regional water companies. It subsequently became known as Eastern Group, with offices across the east of England including Norwich, Ipswich, Wherstead Park, Rayleigh, Enfield, Bedford and Bury St Edmunds. Its former electrical stores were merged with those from the former Midlands Electricity and Southern Electric boards and called Powerhouse. Eastern purchased 12.5% of National Power.

== The Energy Group ==
The origins of The Energy Group date back to 1990 when Hanson plc acquired Peabody Energy, a US coal business.

In 1995, Hanson plc bought Eastern Group for £2.5 billion. Hanson purchased the remaining shares Eastern did not own in the jointly owned electrical retailer Powerhouse, but sold the business on as a going concern. In 1996, the Energy Group purchased 6000 megawatts of power stations from National Power and Powergen, with the 4000 megawatts from National Power costing $2.5 billion, as part of its bid by the two generating companies to stave off the regulator. Its subsidiary, Eastern Natural Gas, was reported to be making a loss close to £40 million after a big push to grab market share after deregulation. Hanson ownership lasted until 1997, when The Energy Group was demerged from Hanson plc and floated on the London Stock Exchange. The business expanded into telecoms linking up with Esprit Telecom.

In 1997, PacifiCorp, a US energy firm launched a $9.6 billion bid for The Energy Group, which was referred to the Monopolies & Merger Commission. The bid expired before the Monopolies & Merger Commission completed their investigation, and PacifiCorp were joined by Texas Utilities and Nomura Holdings in a takeover battle. Nomura pulled out of the bidding, and due to the hostile nature of the bids, both PacifiCorp and Texas Utilities were told to put in sealed bids. Before the deadline, PacifiCorp withdrew their bid, so Texas Utilities won with a bid of $10 billion. Texas Utilities sold Peabody to Lehman Merchant Banking Partners for $2.3bn as part of the purchase.

== TXU Europe ==
Following the acquisition, Texas Utilities was renamed TXU Corporation, with the Energy Group renamed TXU Europe. Some of the purchase debt was indebted back onto the UK businesses. The group purchased gas fields in the southern North Sea in 1998. The Telecom business announced that it had developed its own equipment to use the company's powerlines for telecommunications in July 1998, with a further 550 km of lines being purchased that October. The business announced in 1999, that the company's turnover in 1998 had grown by 13% to £3.74 billion and profit had risen to £212.6M, a 59% increase. The Telecom business was sold to NTL in January 1999, and purchased further stakes in North Sea gas fields. The retail business was renamed from Eastern Electricity, and its subsidiary Eastern Natural Gas, to Eastern Energy in 1999, with a restructure which saw its retail operations focused on Ipswich, Bedford and Rayleigh. The company purchased BG Group plc's UK Combined Heat & Power plants, and purchased 5% of Hidroelectrica, a Spanish electricity company in 1999, which it grew to just under 20% in 2000. The company announced it was selling its metering business in October 1999. In 2000 TXU Europe purchased the retail business of NORWEB from United Utilities. The combined retail business was renamed TXU Energi in August 2001. In a separate deal with United Utilities, TXU signed a seven-year deal with its customer service provider Vertex, to manage its domestic retail customers. In July 2000, TXU Europe purchased 51% share of German energy business, Stadtwerke Kiel, for $215 million from State Capital Kiel Parliament. A formal cash bid was made to purchase the remaining shares in Hidroelectrica but this was later withdrawn.

The company's distribution rights were originally merged with EDF Energy, owners of London Electricity and South Eastern Electricity Board, two other former regional electricity companies to become 24seven Utility Services in 2000, before being sold to EDF permanently for £560m plus £740m of debt in 2001. The Eastern and London distribution networks were later sold on to UK Power Networks. In a separate deal in November 2001 TXU Europe sold West Burton power stations to London Electricity Group for £366 million. The company's shares in Hidroelectrica were sold in 2001.

TXU Energi was announced in 2001 as the new sponsor of Ipswich Town F.C. In July 2001, TXU sold Rugeley power stations to International Power for £200 million. This was followed by the sale of Peterborough and King's Lynn Combined Cycle Gas Turbine (CCGT) power stations to Centrica in August. The company's agreed a partnership with Farm Energy, ABB, Powergen, and Royal Dutch Shell to develop the London Array wind farm.

In March 2002, TXU bought the UK retail business of Amerada Hess with plans to integrate into TXU Energi. In April 2002, it was announced that the Russell House office in Ipswich would be demolished and be rebuilt as the company's new headquarters, replacing Wherstead Park, along with other Ipswich sites. In May 2002 TXU Europe won the bidding battle for Braunschweiger Versorgungs AG (BS Energy), a German energy provider from the city of Braunschweig, buying 74.9% for €420 million. TXU Energi was announced as the new sponsor of the Rugby League Challenge Cup in Summer 2002.

In October 2002, TXU announced it was pulling out of Europe to protect the US business, after the European business was affected by a drop in wholesale prices and its credit rating dropping, caused by a large debt created at the purchase by TXU in 1998. Powergen purchased TXU's UK retail businesses for £1.37bn ($2.9bn) later that year, after a takeover battle with SSE plc. Powergen was formally taken over by E.ON in January 2002.

The collapse of the business lead to former shareholders losing £19m, as during the takeover by Texas Utilities they had taken loan notes instead of cash for their shares, which were not secured.

== In Media ==
In 2006, artist Rory Macbeth painted Sir Thomas More’s entire novel Utopia onto an old Eastern Electricity building on Westwick Street in Norwich.

== See also ==
- Companies merged into Eastern Electricity Board (EEB)
