= Southern Electric =

UK business

Southern Electric plc
- Type: Public
- Founded: 1990
- Defunct: 1998
- Fate: Acquired
- Successor: Scottish and Southern Energy
- Headquarters: Reading, England
- Products: Gas and electricity

Southern Electric plc was a public limited energy company in the United Kingdom between 1990 and 1998, when it merged with Scottish Hydro-Electric plc to form Scottish and Southern Energy plc (now SSE plc). The company had its origins in the southern England region of the British nationalised electricity industry. Created in 1948 as the Southern Electricity Board, in 1990 it was privatised by being floated on the London Stock Exchange.

== History ==
The company originated as the Southern Electricity Board, created in 1948 as part of the nationalisation of the electricity industry by the Electricity Act 1947. The board's assets passed in 1990 to Southern Electric plc, one of the fourteen public electricity suppliers, and that company was privatised in the same year. In 1998 the company merged with Scottish Hydro-Electric plc and became part of Scottish and Southern Energy.

Post-merger logo

SSE used the "Southern Electric" name and logo for a time as a brand name for retail distribution of gas and electricity in the south of England, before replacing it with SSE branding. Following the purchase of SSE's retail business by OVO Energy in 2020, the Southern Electric brand is a trading name of OVO Electricity Limited.

=== Southern Electricity Board ===
The key people on the board were: Chairman Henry Nimmo (1948–54), Chairman R.R.B. Brown (1964, 1967), Deputy Chairman W.B. Poulter (1964, 1967), full-time member A. W. Bunch (1967).

The number of customers supplied by the board was:

Customers supplied by the Southern Electricity Board
Year	1948/9	1960/1	1965/6	1970/1	1975/6	1978/9	1980/1	1985/6	1987/8	1988/9
No. of customers, 1000s	876	1429	1616	1829	1993	2095	2150	2312	2386	2424

Electricity, in GWh, sold by the Southern Electricity Board over its operational life

=== Existing electricity suppliers taken over at nationalisation ===
The Electricity (Allocation of Undertakings to Area Boards) Order 1948 (SI 1948/484) transferred the electricity business of the following local authorities and private companies to the new board effective 31 March 1948.

==== Local authorities ====
- Aldershot Corporation
- Basingstoke Corporation
- Bournemouth Corporation
- Brentford and Chiswick Corporation
- Calne Corporation
- Chichester Corporation
- Dorchester Corporation
- Ealing Corporation
- Fareham Urban District Council
- Heston Isleworth Corporation
- High Wycombe Corporation
- Maidenhead Corporation
- Marlborough Corporation
- Oxford Corporation
- Portland Urban District Council
- Portsmouth Corporation
- Reading Corporation
- Southampton Corporation
- Swindon Corporation
- Weymouth Melcombe Regis Corporation
- Winchester Corporation
- Witney Urban District Council

==== Private companies ====
- Alton District Electricity Company
- Ascot District Gas and Electricity Company
- Blandford Forum and District Electric Supply Company
- Bognor and District Gas and Electricity Company
- Bournemouth and Poole Electricity Supply Company
- Brentford Electric Supply Company
- Burford Electric Light Power Company
- Egham and Staines Electricity Company
- Farnham Gas and Electricity Company
- Isle of Wight Electric Light and Power Company
- Metropolitan Electric Supply Company
- Mid Southern Utility Company
- Milford-on-Sea Electric Supply Company
- Milton and Barton-on-Sea (Hants.) Electricity Supply Company
- Petersfield Electric Light and Power Company
- Ringwood Electric Supply Company
- Salisbury Electric Light and Supply Company
- Slough and Datchet Electric Supply Company
- Uxbridge and District Electric Supply Company
- Wessex Electricity Company
- West Hampshire Electricity Company
- Whitchurch (Hants.) Gas and Electricity Company
- Wilton Electricity Supply Company
- Windsor Electrical Installation Company
- Woodstock and District Electrical Distribution Company
- Yorktown (Camberley) and District Gas and Electricity Company

== Operations ==
The Southern Electric name continues to be used by SSE's subsidiary Southern Electric Power Distribution plc, the distribution network operator in the south of England.

In April 2013 the UK electricity market regulator OFGEM fined Southern Electric £10.5 million for breaches of conduct in relation to mis-selling, from the top of the business down.

== See also ==
- Companies merged into Southern Electricity Board (SEB)
