= Electricity Act =

Electricity Act may refer to:

Acts of the Parliament of the United Kingdom:

- Electric Lighting Acts 1882 to 1909
- Electric Lighting (Scotland Act) 1890
- Electric Lighting (Scotland Act) 1902
- Electricity (Supply) Act 1919
- Electricity (Supply) Act 1922
- Electricity (Supply) Act 1926
- Electricity (Supply) Act 1928
- Electricity (Supply) Act (Northern Ireland) 1931
- Electricity (Supply) Act 1933
- Electricity (Supply) Act 1935
- Electricity Supply (Meters) Act 1936
- Electricity Act 1947
- Electricity (Supply) Act (Northern Ireland) 1948
- Electricity Supply (Meters) Act 1952
- Electricity Reorganisation (Scotland Act) 1954
- Electricity Act 1957, repealed 1989
- Electricity (Borrowing Powers) Act 1959
- Electricity (Amendment) Act 1961
- Electricity and Gas Act 1963
- Gas and Electricity Act 1968
- Electricity Act 1972
- Electricity (Scotland) Act 1979
- Electricity (Financial Provisions) (Scotland) Act 1988
- Electricity Act 1989, replacing the 1957 Act

Acts of the Parliament of India:

- The Electricity Act, 2003

Acts of the Parliament of Sri Lanka:

- Ceylon Electricity Board Act, No. 17 of 1969
- Sri Lanka Electricity Act, No. 20 of 2009
- Sri Lanka Electricity Act, No. 36 of 2024

== See also ==
- Energy law
