= Electric or Electricity Act =

Stock title for electricity regulation

An Electric or Electricity Act, with its variations, is a stock short title used internationally for legislation relating to the regulation, generation, transmission, distribution, supply or use of electric power (electricity) as a source of energy.

== List ==
=== Ireland ===
- The Sligo Lighting and Electric Power Act, 1924 - Act No. 1/1924
- Electricity Undertakings (Continuance of Charges) Act, 1924 - Act No. 17/1924
- Shannon Electricity Act, 1925 - Act No. 26/1925
- Electricity Supply (Special Powers) Act, 1926 - Act No. 2/1926
- Electricity (Supply) Act, 1927 - Act No. 27/1927
- Electricity Regulation Act, 1999 - Act No. 23/1999

=== India ===
- Indian Electricity Act, 1910
- The Electricity Act, 2003

=== New Zealand ===
- Electricity Act 1968
- Electricity Act 1992

=== Sri Lanka ===
- Ceylon Electricity Board Act, No. 17 of 1969
- Sri Lanka Electricity Act, No. 20 of 2009
- Sri Lanka Electricity Act, No. 36 of 2024

=== United Kingdom ===
The following list is of UK Public General Acts, which have a national applicability. There are also a large number of Local Acts, not included here. See Timeline of the UK electricity supply industry.

- Electric Lighting Act 1882
- Electric Lighting Act 1886
- Electric Lighting Act 1888
- Electric Lighting Act 1909
- Electric Lighting (Clauses) Act 1899
- Electricity Act 1947
- Electricity Act 1957
- Electricity Act 1972
- Electricity Act 1979
- Electricity Act 1989
- Electricity (Supply) Act 1917
- Electricity (Supply) Act 1919
- Electricity (Supply) Act 1922
- Electricity (Supply) Act 1926
- Electricity (Supply) Act 1933
- Electricity (Supply) Act 1935
- Electricity (Supply) Act (Northern Ireland) 1931
- Electricity (Supply) Act (Northern Ireland) 1948
- Electricity (Supply) Act (Northern Ireland) 1967
- The Electricity (Northern Ireland) Order 1992

== See also ==
- List of short titles
- Energy Law
- Timeline of the UK electricity supply industry
- Gas Act
- Petroleum Act
