= List of acts of the Parliament of the United Kingdom from 1988 =

This is a list of acts of the Parliament of the United Kingdom passed in 1988.

Acts passed since 1963 are cited by calendar year, as opposed to the convention used for earlier acts of citing the regnal year(s) in which the relevant parliamentary session was held. Each act passed in a respective year is given a chapter number (abbreviated "c."), denoted by Arabic numerals in the case of public general acts, lowercase Roman numerals in the case of local acts, or italicised Arabic numerals in the case of personal acts. These run as separate series.

89 acts of Parliament were passed in 1988: 55 public general acts and 34 local acts.

indicates that an act has been transcribed on Wikisource, indicates that an act is available to view at legislation.gov.uk, and indicates the location of the original act in the Parliamentary Archives.

== Public general acts ==
| Short title | Citation | Royal assent |
Long title
| Income and Corporation Taxes Act 1988 | 1988 c. 1 | 9 February 1988 |
An Act to consolidate certain of the enactments relating to income tax and corporation tax, including certain enactments relating also to capital gains tax; and to repeal as obsolete section 339(1) of the Income and Corporation Taxes Act 1970 (Note: Income and Corporation Taxes Act 1970 (c. 10)) and paragraphs 3 and 4 of Schedule 11 to the Finance Act 1980. (Note: Finance Act 1980 (c. 48))
| Arms Control and Disarmament (Privileges and Immunities) Act 1988 | 1988 c. 2 | 9 February 1988 |
An Act to provide for conferring privileges and immunities on observers, inspectors and auxiliary personnel exercising functions under international agreements or arrangements for furthering arms control or disarmament.
| Land Registration Act 1988 (repealed) | 1988 c. 3 | 15 March 1988 |
An Act to amend section 112 of the Land Registration Act 1925, (Note: Land Registration Act 1925 (15 & 16 Geo. 5. c. 21)) and for connected purposes. (Repealed by Land Registration Act 2002 (c. 9))
| Norfolk and Suffolk Broads Act 1988 | 1988 c. 4 | 15 March 1988 |
An Act to establish an authority to be known as the Broads Authority; to make provision with respect to its powers; to make provision with respect to the area commonly known as the Broads and with respect to the Great Yarmouth Port and Haven and its Commissioners; to provide for the making of grants to the Authority by the Secretary of State; and for connected purposes.
| Welsh Development Agency Act 1988 (repealed) | 1988 c. 5 | 15 March 1988 |
An Act to increase the financial limit which applies by virtue of section 18 of the Welsh Development Agency Act 1975 (Note: Welsh Development Agency Act 1975 (c. 70)) to the general external borrowing of the Agency and certain other amounts. (Repealed by Welsh Development Agency Act 1991 (c. 69))
| Consolidated Fund Act 1988 | 1988 c. 6 | 15 March 1988 |
An Act to apply certain sums out of the Consolidated Fund to the service of the years ending on 31st March 1987 and 1988.
| Social Security Act 1988 | 1988 c. 7 | 15 March 1988 |
An Act to amend the law relating to social security and to make fresh provision in relation to welfare foods and for the remission of charges for services provided under the National Health Service Act 1977 (Note: National Health Service Act 1977 (c. 49)) and the National Health Service (Scotland) Act 1978 (Note: National Health Service (Scotland) Act 1978 (c. 29)) and the payment of travelling and overnight expenses for the purpose of persons availing themselves of services provided under those Acts; and for connected purposes.
| Multilateral Investment Guarantee Agency Act 1988 | 1988 c. 8 | 24 March 1988 |
An Act to enable the United Kingdom to give effect to the Convention establishing the Multilateral Investment Guarantee Agency.
| Local Government Act 1988 | 1988 c. 9 | 24 March 1988 |
An Act to secure that local and other public authorities undertake certain activities only if they can do so competitively; to regulate certain functions of local and other public authorities in connection with public supply or works contracts; to authorise and regulate the provision of financial assistance by local authorities for certain housing purposes; to prohibit the promotion of homosexuality by local authorities; to make provision about local authorities' publicity, local government administration, the powers of auditors, land held by public bodies, direct labour organisations, arrangements under the Employment and Training Act 1973, (Note: Employment and Training Act 1973 (c. 50)) the Commission for Local Authority Accounts in Scotland, the auditing of accounts of local authorities in Scotland, and dog registration, dog licences and stray dogs; and for connected purposes.
| Duchy of Lancaster Act 1988 | 1988 c. 10 | 3 May 1988 |
An Act to extend the leasing powers of the Chancellor and Council of the Duchy of Lancaster.
| Regional Development Grants (Termination) Act 1988 (repealed) | 1988 c. 11 | 3 May 1988 |
An Act to preclude the making of grants under Part II of the Industrial Development Act 1982 (Note: Industrial Development Act 1982 (c. 52)) after 31 March 1988 unless previously applied for and to restrict the payment of such grants in certain cases; and for connected purposes. (Repealed by Statute Law (Repeals) Act 2004 (c. 14))
| Merchant Shipping Act 1988 (repealed) | 1988 c. 12 | 3 May 1988 |
An Act to amend the law relating to the registration of ships; to make provision for the giving of financial assistance in connection with the training of seamen and crew relief costs; to make provision for the establishment of a Merchant Navy Reserve; to make further provision with respect to the safety of shipping, with respect to liability and compensation for oil pollution and with respect to the financing and administration of the lighthouse service; to make other amendments of the law relating to shipping, seamen and pollution; and for connected purposes. (Repealed by Deregulation Act 2015 (c. 20))
| Coroners Act 1988 (repealed) | 1988 c. 13 | 10 May 1988 |
An Act to consolidate the Coroners Acts 1887 to 1980 and certain related enactments, with amendments to give effect to recommendations of the Law Commission. (Repealed by Coroners and Justice Act 2009 (c. 25))
| Immigration Act 1988 | 1988 c. 14 | 10 May 1988 |
An Act to make further provision for the regulation of immigration into the United Kingdom; and for connected purposes.
| Public Utility Transfers and Water Charges Act 1988 | 1988 c. 15 | 10 May 1988 |
An Act to confer powers on water authorities, electricity boards and the Electricity Council to act in relation to proposals for the transfer of any of the property or functions of water authorities or electricity boards to other bodies corporate; and to make provision for and in connection with the fixing of charges by water undertakers.
| Farm Land and Rural Development Act 1988 | 1988 c. 16 | 10 May 1988 |
An Act to provide for the payment of grants for certain purposes connected with farm businesses or with the conversion of agricultural land to woodlands; and to increase the limit on the number of members of the Development Commission.
| Licensing Act 1988 (repealed) | 1988 c. 17 | 19 May 1988 |
An Act to amend the Licensing Act 1964. (Note: Licensing Act 1964 (c. 26)) (Repealed by Licensing Act 2003 (c. 17))
| Matrimonial Proceedings (Transfers) Act 1988 | 1988 c. 18 | 19 May 1988 |
An Act to empower the High Court to transfer to county courts certain matrimonial proceedings and to validate certain High Court orders purporting to transfer such proceedings to county courts; and for connected purposes.
| Employment Act 1988 | 1988 c. 19 | 26 May 1988 |
An Act to make provision with respect to trade unions, their members and their property, to things done for the purpose of enforcing membership of a trade union, to trade union ballots and elections and to proceedings involving trade unions; to provide for the Manpower Services Commission to be known as the Training Commission; to amend the law with respect to the constitution and functions of that Commission and with respect to persons to whom facilities for work-experience and training for employment are made available; to enable additional members to be appointed to industrial training boards and to the Agricultural Training Board; and to provide that the terms on which certain persons hold office or employment under the Crown are to be treated for certain purposes as contained in contracts of employment.
| Dartford-Thurrock Crossing Act 1988 | 1988 c. 20 | 28 June 1988 |
An Act to provide for the construction of a bridge over the river Thames between Dartford in Kent and Thurrock in Essex and of associated works; to provide for the Secretary of State to be the highway authority for the highways passing through the tunnels under that river between Dartford and Thurrock and their approaches instead of Kent and Essex County Councils; to provide for the levying of tolls, by a person appointed by the Secretary of State or by the Secretary of State, in respect of traffic using the crossing; to provide for transfers of property and liabilities of those Councils to the person appointed and the Secretary of State and for the transfer to the Secretary of State of property and liabilities of the person appointed on termination of his appointment; to provide for the management of the crossing, including the imposition of prohibitions, restrictions and requirements in relation to traffic, and otherwise in relation to the crossing; and for connected purposes.
| Consumer Arbitration Agreements Act 1988 (repealed) | 1988 c. 21 | 28 June 1988 |
An Act to extend to consumers certain rights as regards agreements to refer future differences to arbitration and for purposes connected therewith. (Repealed by Arbitration Act 1996 (c. 23))
| Scotch Whisky Act 1988 (repealed) | 1988 c. 22 | 28 June 1988 |
An Act to make provision as to the definition of Scotch whisky and as to the production and sale of whisky; and for connected purposes. (Repealed by Scotch Whisky Regulations 2009 (SI 2009/2890))
| Motor Vehicles (Wearing of Rear Seat Belts by Children) Act 1988 | 1988 c. 23 | 28 June 1988 |
An Act to make provision for the wearing of rear seat belts by children; and for connected purposes.
| Community Health Councils (Access to Information) Act 1988 (repealed) | 1988 c. 24 | 29 July 1988 |
An Act to provide for access by the public to meetings of, and to certain documents and information relating to, Community Health Councils and committees of those Councils and for related purposes. (Repealed by Health and Social Care (Quality and Engagement) (Wales) Act 2020 (asc 1))
| Licensing (Retail Sales) Act 1988 (repealed) | 1988 c. 25 | 29 July 1988 |
An Act to amend the definition of "sale by retail" in section 201 of the Licensing Act 1964; and for connected purposes. (Repealed by Licensing Act 2003 (c. 17))
| Landlord and Tenant Act 1988 | 1988 c. 26 | 29 July 1988 |
An Act to make new provision for imposing statutory duties in connection with covenants in tenancies against assigning, underletting, charging or parting with the possession of premises without consent.
| Malicious Communications Act 1988 | 1988 c. 27 | 29 July 1988 |
An Act to make provision for the punishment of persons who send or deliver letters or other articles for the purpose of causing distress or anxiety.
| Access to Medical Reports Act 1988 | 1988 c. 28 | 29 July 1988 |
An Act to establish a right of access by individuals to reports relating to themselves provided by medical practitioners for employment or insurance purposes and to make provision for related matters.
| Protection of Animals (Amendment) Act 1988 | 1988 c. 29 | 29 July 1988 |
An Act to enable a court to disqualify a person for having custody of an animal on a first conviction of cruelty; and to increase the penalties for offences relating to animal fights, and to make further provision with respect to attendance at such fights, in England and Wales and to penalise attendance at such fights in Scotland.
| Environment and Safety Information Act 1988 | 1988 c. 30 | 29 July 1988 |
An Act to establish public registers of certain notices served concerning health, safety and environmental protection; and for related purposes.
| Protection against Cruel Tethering Act 1988 (repealed) | 1988 c. 31 | 29 July 1988 |
An Act to protect horses, asses and mules against cruel tethering; and for purposes connected therewith. (Repealed by Animal Welfare Act 2006 (c. 45))
| Civil Evidence (Scotland) Act 1988 | 1988 c. 32 | 29 July 1988 |
An Act to make fresh provision in relation to civil proceedings in Scotland regarding corroboration of evidence and the admissibility of hearsay and other evidence; and for connected purposes.
| Criminal Justice Act 1988 | 1988 c. 33 | 29 July 1988 |
An Act to make fresh provision for extradition; to amend the rules of evidence in criminal proceedings; to provide for the reference by the Attorney General of certain questions relating to sentencing to the Court of Appeal; to amend the law with regard to the jurisdiction and powers of criminal courts, the collection, enforcement and remission of fines imposed by coroners, juries, supervision orders, the detention of children and young persons, probation and the probation service, criminal appeals, anonymity in cases of rape and similar cases, orders under sections 4 and 11 of the Contempt of Court Act 1981 (Note: Contempt of Court Act 1981 (c. 49)) relating to trials on indictment, orders restricting the access of the public to the whole or any part of a trial on indictment or to any proceedings ancillary to such a trial and orders restricting the publication of any report of the whole or any part of a trial on indictment or any such ancillary proceedings, the alteration of names of petty sessions areas, officers of inner London magistrates' courts and the costs and expenses of prosecution witnesses and certain other persons; to make fresh provision for the payment of compensation by the Criminal Injuries Compensation Board; to make provision for the payment of compensation for a miscarriage of justice which has resulted in a wrongful conviction; to create an offence of torture and an offence of having an article with a blade or point in a public place; to create further offences relating to weapons; to create a summary offence of possession of an indecent photograph of a child; to amend the Police and Criminal Evidence Act 1984 (Note: Police and Criminal Evidence Act 1984 (c. 60)) in relation to searches, computer data about fingerprints and bail for persons in customs detention; to make provision in relation to the taking of body samples by the police in Northern Ireland; to amend the Bail Act 1976; (Note: Bail Act 1976 (c. 63)) to give a justice of the peace power to authorise entry and search of premises for offensive weapons; to provide for the enforcement of the Video Recordings Act 1984 (Note: Video Recordings Act 1984 (c. 39)) by officers of a weights and measures authority and in Northern Ireland by officers of the Department of Economic Development; to extend to the purchase of easements and other rights over land the power to purchase land conferred on the Secretary of State by section 36 of the Prison Act 1952; (Note: Prison Act 1952 (15 & 16 Geo. 6 & 1 Eliz. 2. c. 52)) and for connected purposes.
| Legal Aid Act 1988 | 1988 c. 34 | 29 July 1988 |
An Act to make new provision for the administration of, and to revise the law relating to, legal aid, advice and assistance.
| British Steel Act 1988 | 1988 c. 35 | 29 July 1988 |
An Act to provide for the vesting of the property, rights and liabilities of the British Steel Corporation in a company nominated by the Secretary of State and for the subsequent dissolution of the Corporation; and for connected purposes.
| Court of Session Act 1988 | 1988 c. 36 | 29 July 1988 |
An Act to consolidate, with amendments to give effect to recommendations of the Scottish Law Commission, certain enactments relating to the constitution, administration and procedure of the Court of Session and procedure on appeal therefrom to the House of Lords; and to repeal, in accordance with recommendations of the Scottish Law Commission, certain enactments relating to the aforesaid matters which are no longer of practical utility.
| Electricity (Financial Provisions) (Scotland) Act 1988 (repealed) | 1988 c. 37 | 29 July 1988 |
An Act to raise the financial limit imposed by and by virtue of section 29(1) of the Electricity (Scotland) Act 1979. (Note: Electricity (Scotland) Act 1979 (c. 11)) (Repealed by Electricity Act 1989 (c. 29))
| Appropriation Act 1988 | 1988 c. 38 | 29 July 1988 |
An Act to apply a sum out of the Consolidated Fund to the service of the year ending on 31st March 1989, to appropriate the supplies granted in this Session of Parliament, and to repeal certain Consolidated Fund and Appropriation Acts.
| Finance Act 1988 | 1988 c. 39 | 29 July 1988 |
An Act to grant certain duties, to alter other duties, and to amend the law relating to the National Debt and the Public Revenue, and to make further provision in connection with Finance.
| Education Reform Act 1988 | 1988 c. 40 | 29 July 1988 |
An Act to amend the law relating to education.
| Local Government Finance Act 1988 | 1988 c. 41 | 29 July 1988 |
An Act to create community charges in favour of certain authorities, to create new rating systems, to provide for precepting by certain authorities and levying by certain bodies, to make provision about the payment of grants to certain authorities, to require certain authorities to maintain certain funds, to make provision about the capital expenditure and the administration of the financial affairs of certain authorities, to abolish existing rates, precepts and similar rights, to abolish rate support grants and supplementary grants for transport purposes, to make amendments as to rates and certain grants, to make certain amendments to the law of Scotland as regards community charges, rating and valuation, to provide for the establishment of valuation and community charge tribunals, and for connected purposes.
| Solicitors (Scotland) Act 1988 | 1988 c. 42 | 29 July 1988 |
An Act to amend the Solicitors (Scotland) Act 1980; (Note: Solicitors (Scotland) Act 1980 (c. 46)) and for connected purposes.
| Housing (Scotland) Act 1988 | 1988 c. 43 | 2 November 1988 |
An Act to establish a body having functions relating to housing; and, as respects Scotland, to make further provision with respect to houses let on tenancies; to confer on that body and on persons approved for the purpose the right to acquire from public sector landlords certain houses occupied by secure tenants; to make new provision as to the limit on discount on the price of houses purchased by secure tenants; to provide for the making of local authority grants to assist local authority tenants to obtain accommodation otherwise than as such tenants; to abolish, and make interim provision for the capitalisation of, certain subsidies and contributions relating to housing; to make further provision about rent officers and the administration of housing benefit and rent allowance subsidy; to make provision for the disposal of housing land by development corporations; and for connected purposes.
| Foreign Marriage (Amendment) Act 1988 | 1988 c. 44 | 2 November 1988 |
An Act to amend the Foreign Marriage Act 1892 (Note: Foreign Marriage Act 1892 (55 & 56 Vict. c. 23)) and to repeal certain enactments which are spent relating to the validation of marriages of British subjects solemnised outside the United Kingdom.
| Firearms (Amendment) Act 1988 | 1988 c. 45 | 15 November 1988 |
An Act to amend the Firearms Act 1968 (Note: Firearms Act 1968 (c. 27) and to make further provision for regulating the possession of, and transactions relating to, firearms and ammunition.
| European Communities (Finance) Act 1988 (repealed) | 1988 c. 46 | 15 November 1988 |
An Act to amend the definition of "the Treaties" and "the Community Treaties" in section 1(2) of the European Communities Act 1972 (Note: European Communities Act 1972 (c. 68)) so as to include the decision of 24th June 1988 of the Council of the Communities on the Communities' system of own resources and the undertaking by the Representatives of the Governments of the member States, as confirmed at their meeting within the Council on 24th June 1988 in Luxembourg, to make payments to finance the Communities' general budget for the financial year 1988. (Repealed by European Communities (Finance) Act 1995 (c. 1))
| School Boards (Scotland) Act 1988 (repealed) | 1988 c. 47 | 15 November 1988 |
An Act to make new provision for the government of public schools in Scotland; and for connected purposes. (Repealed by Scottish Schools (Parental Involvement) Act 2006 (asp 8))
| Copyright, Designs and Patents Act 1988 | 1988 c. 48 | 15 November 1988 |
An Act to restate the law of copyright, with amendments; to make fresh provision as to the rights of performers and others in performances; to confer a design right in original designs; to amend the Registered Designs Act 1949; (Note: Registered Designs Act 1949 (12, 13 & 14 Geo. 6. c. 88)) to make provision with respect to patent agents and trade mark agents; to confer patents and designs jurisdiction on certain county courts; to amend the law of patents; to make provision with respect to devices designed to circumvent copy-protection of works in electronic form; to make fresh provision penalising the fraudulent reception of transmissions; to make the fraudulent application or use of a trade mark an offence; to make provision for the benefit of the Hospital for Sick Children, Great Ormond Street, London; to enable financial assistance to be given to certain international bodies; and for connected purposes.
| Health and Medicines Act 1988 | 1988 c. 49 | 15 November 1988 |
An Act to make further provision in relation to the National Health Service, the testing of sight and instruction in matters relating to health and welfare; to amend the Medicines Act 1968 (Note: Medicines Act 1968 (c. 67)) and the Medicines Act 1971 (Note: Medicines Act 1971 (c. 69)) and to empower the Secretary of State to make regulations about HIV testing kits and services.
| Housing Act 1988 | 1988 c. 50 | 15 November 1988 |
An Act to make further provision with respect to dwelling-houses let on tenancies or occupied under licences; to amend the Rent Act 1977 (Note: Rent Act 1977 (c. 42)) and the Rent (Agriculture) Act 1976; (Note: Rent (Agriculture) Act 1976 (c. 80)) to establish a body, Housing for Wales, having functions relating to housing associations; to amend the Housing Associations Act 1985 (Note: Housing Associations Act 1985 (c. 69)) and to repeal and re-enact with amendments certain provisions of Part II of that Act; to make provision for the establishment of housing action trusts for areas designated by the Secretary of State; to confer on persons approved for the purpose the right to acquire from public sector landlords certain dwelling-houses occupied by secure tenants; to make further provision about rent officers, the administration of housing benefit and rent allowance subsidy, the right to buy, repair notices and certain disposals of land and the application of capital money arising thereon; to make provision consequential upon the Housing (Scotland) Act 1988; (Note: Housing (Scotland) Act 1988 (c. 43)) and for connected purposes.
| Rate Support Grants Act 1988 (repealed) | 1988 c. 51 | 15 November 1988 |
An Act to make further provision about rate support grants. (Repealed by Statute Law (Repeals) Act 2004 (c. 14))
| Road Traffic Act 1988 | 1988 c. 52 | 15 November 1988 |
An Act to consolidate certain enactments relating to road traffic with amendments to give effect to recommendations of the Law Commission and the Scottish Law Commission.
| Road Traffic Offenders Act 1988 | 1988 c. 53 | 15 November 1988 |
An Act to consolidate certain enactments relating to the prosecution and punishment (including the punishment without conviction) of road traffic offences with amendments to give effect to recommendations of the Law Commission and the Scottish Law Commission.
| Road Traffic (Consequential Provisions) Act 1988 | 1988 c. 54 | 15 November 1988 |
An Act to make provision for repeals (including a repeal to give effect to a recommendation of the Law Commission and the Scottish Law Commission), consequential amendments, transitional and transitory matters and savings in connection with the consolidation of enactments in the Road Traffic Act 1988 (Note: Road Traffic Act 1988 (c. 52)) and the Road Traffic Offenders Act 1988. (Note: Road Traffic Offenders Act 1988 (c. 53))
| Consolidated Fund (No. 2) Act 1988 | 1988 c. 55 | 20 December 1988 |
An Act to apply certain sums out of the Consolidated Fund to the service of the years ending on 31st March 1989 and 1990.

== Local acts ==
| Short title | Citation | Royal assent |
Long title
| Greater Manchester (Light Rapid Transit System) Act 1988 | 1988 c. i | 9 February 1988 |
An Act to empower the Greater Manchester Passenger Transport Executive to construct works and to acquire lands; to confer further powers on the Executive; and for other purposes.
| Greater Manchester (Light Rapid Transit System) (No. 2) Act 1988 | 1988 c. ii | 9 February 1988 |
An Act to empower the Greater Manchester Passenger Transport Executive to construct further works and to acquire additional lands; to confer further powers on the Executive; and for other purposes.
| University College London Act 1988 | 1988 c. iii | 9 February 1988 |
An Act to unite The Middlesex Hospital Medical School, the Institute of Laryngology and Otology, the Institute of Orthopaedics and the Institute of Urology with University College London; to transfer all rights, properties and liabilities from the said school and institutes to University College London; and for connected and other purposes.
| Keble College Oxford Act 1988 | 1988 c. iv | 15 March 1988 |
An Act to empower Keble College in the University of Oxford to make statutes in accordance with the provisions of the Universities of Oxford and Cambridge Act 1923; (Note: Universities of Oxford and Cambridge Act 1923 (13 & 14 Geo. 5. c. 33)) to provide for the validation of statutes purported to have been made in respect of that college under the said Act; and for other purposes.
| Selwyn College Cambridge Act 1988 | 1988 c. v | 15 March 1988 |
An Act to empower Selwyn College in the University of Cambridge to make statutes in accordance with the provisions of the Universities of Oxford and Cambridge Act 1923; to provide for the validation of statutes purported to have been made in respect of that college under the said Act; and for other purposes.
| Whitchurch Bridge Act 1988 | 1988 c. vi | 15 March 1988 |
An Act to modify the Transport Charges &c. (Miscellaneous Provisions) Act 1954 (Note: Transport Charges &c. (Miscellaneous Provisions) Act 1954 (2 & 3 Eliz. 2. c. 64)) in its application to the bridge undertaking of the Company of Proprietors of Whitchurch Bridge; to confer other powers on the proprietors and to amend or repeal certain of the local statutory provisions applicable to them; and for other purposes.
| Hastings Borough Council Act 1988 | 1988 c. vii | 15 March 1988 |
An Act to re-enact with amendments and to extend certain local enactments in force within the Borough of Hastings in relation to the foreshore and other lands vested in the Hastings Borough Council; to confer powers in respect of retaining walls; and for other purposes.
| City of Westminster Act 1988 (repealed) | 1988 c. viii | 15 March 1988 |
An Act to make further provision for the enforcement of the Litter Act 1983 (Note: Litter Act 1983 (c. 35)) in the City of Westminster. (Repealed by Environmental Protection Act 1990 (c. 43))
| Liverpool Exchange Act 1988 | 1988 c. ix | 15 March 1988 |
An Act to repeal the Liverpool Exchange Acts 1859 to 1965; (Note: Liverpool Exchange Act 1859 (22 & 23 Vict. c. xxviii)) (Note: Liverpool Exchange Act 1864 (27 & 28 Vict. c. cxlv)) (Note: Liverpool Exchange Act 1930 (20 & 21 Geo. 5. c. lxiv)) (Note: Liverpool Exchange Act 1937 (1 Edw. 8 & 1 Geo. 6. c. xiv)) (Note: Liverpool Exchange Act 1965 (c. vi)) and for connected and other purposes.
| Corn Exchange Act 1988 | 1988 c. x | 15 March 1988 |
An Act to relieve The Corn Exchange Company Limited of its statutory obligations to provide a corn exchange; to alter the objects and powers of the Company; and for other purposes.
| British Railways (London) Act 1988 | 1988 c. xi | 24 March 1988 |
An Act to empower the British Railways Board to construct works and to purchase or use land in the city of London and in the London boroughs of Camden and Islington; to extend the time for the compulsory purchase of certain land; to confer further powers on the Board; and for other purposes.
| British Railways Order Confirmation Act 1988 | 1988 c. xii | 3 May 1988 |
An Act to confirm a Provisional Order under the Private Legislation Procedure (Scotland) Act 1936, (Note: Private Legislation Procedure (Scotland) Act 1936 (26 Geo. 5 & 1 Edw. 8. c. 52)) relating to British Railways.
| | British Railways Order 1988 Provisional Order to authorise the provision of a new level crossing at Garve in the district of Ross and Cromarty. | |
| Saint Bennet Fink Burial Ground (City of London) Act 1988 | 1988 c. xiii | 3 May 1988 |
An Act to authorise the removal of restrictions attaching to part of the former burial ground and church of Saint Bennet Fink (otherwise known as Saint Benet Fink) in the city of London; to authorise the use thereof for other purposes; and for purposes connected therewith.
| Felixstowe Dock and Railway Act 1988 | 1988 c. xiv | 19 May 1988 |
An Act to empower the Felixstowe Dock and Railway Company to construct works; to extend and alter the limits of the dock and to provide that the Dock Workers Employment Scheme shall not relate to any part thereof; to extend the area of jurisdiction of the Harwich Harbour Board; to enable the Company to regulate motor vehicle traffic on dock roads and on other places within those limits; to confer further powers on the Company; and for other purposes.
| Scottish Development Agency (Oban South Pier) Order Confirmation Act 1988 | 1988 c. xv | 26 May 1988 |
An Act to confirm a Provisional Order under the Private Legislation Procedure (Scotland) Act 1936, relating to the Scottish Development Agency (Oban South Pier).
| | Scottish Development Agency (Oban South Pier) Order 1988 Provisional Order to empower the Scottish Development Agency to reconstruct and enlarge Oban South Pier; and for related purposes. | |
| Dartmouth–Kingswear Floating Bridge Act 1988 | 1988 c. xvi | 28 June 1988 |
An Act to modify the Transport Charges &c. (Miscellaneous Provisions) Act 1954 in its application to the undertaking of the Dartmouth–Kingswear floating bridge; to confer other powers in relation to the floating bridge on Philip & Son Limited and to amend or repeal certain of the local statutory provisions applicable to the floating bridge; and for other purposes.
| Brighton and Preston Cemetery Act 1988 | 1988 c. xvii | 28 June 1988 |
An Act to confer powers upon Downs Crematorium Limited with respect to the Brighton and Preston Cemetery; and for other purposes.
| Associated British Ports (Barrow) Act 1988 | 1988 c. xviii | 28 June 1988 |
An Act to empower Associated British Ports to construct works and to acquire lands; to confer further powers on A.B. Ports; and for other purposes.
| Bredero (Bon Accord Centre, Aberdeen) Order Confirmation Act 1988 | 1988 c. xix | 29 July 1988 |
An Act to confirm a Provisional Order under the Private Legislation Procedure (Scotland) Act 1936, relating to Bredero (Bon Accord Centre, Aberdeen).
| | Bredero (Bon Accord Centre, Aberdeen) Order 1988 Provisional Order to authorise Bredero Aberdeen Centre Limited to construct a building or structure bridging over Loch Street in the district of the City of Aberdeen; and for other purposes. | |
| Highland Region (Lochinver Harbour) Order Confirmation Act 1988 | 1988 c. xx | 29 July 1988 |
An Act to confirm a Provisional Order under the Private Legislation Procedure (Scotland) Act 1936, relating to Highland Region (Lochinver Harbour).
| | Highland Region (Lochinver Harbour) Order 1988 Provisional Order to confer powers on the Highland Regional Council with respect to their harbour at Lochinver in the district of Sutherland; to provide for new harbour limits within which the Council shall have jurisdiction; and for other purposes. | |
| Eastbourne Harbour Act 1988 | 1988 c. xxi | 29 July 1988 |
An Act to modify the works authorised by the Eastbourne Harbour Act 1980; (Note: Eastbourne Harbour Act 1980 (c. xxxix)) and for related purposes.
| Tor Bay Harbour (Oxen Cove and Coastal Footpath, Brixham) Act 1988 | 1988 c. xxii | 29 July 1988 |
An Act to authorise the Council of the borough of Torbay to reclaim land and to construct works in the harbour at Brixham; to empower the said Council to acquire lands; to extend a public coastal footpath; to confer further powers on the Council; and for connected and other purposes.
| University of Wales College of Cardiff Act 1988 | 1988 c. xxiii | 29 July 1988 |
An Act to dissolve University College, Cardiff and The University of Wales Institute of Science and Technology; to transfer all rights, properties and liabilities of those bodies to University of Wales College of Cardiff; to provide for the pooling of investments and moneys of certain funds of University of Wales College of Cardiff; and for connected and other purposes.
| Imperial College Act 1988 | 1988 c. xxiv | 29 July 1988 |
An Act to unite St. Mary's Hospital Medical School with the Imperial College of Science and Technology; to transfer all rights, properties and liabilities from the Medical School to the College; to make provision with respect to the administration and management of certain funds relating to the College; and for connected and other purposes.
| British Waterways Act 1988 | 1988 c. xxv | 29 July 1988 |
An Act to authorise the British Waterways Board to permit the use for navigation of certain canals which have been closed to navigation by the London Midland and Scottish Railway (Canals) Act 1944; (Note: London Midland and Scottish Railway (Canals) Act 1944 (8 & 9 Geo. 6. c. ii)) and for connected purposes.
| County of South Glamorgan (Taff Crossing) Act 1988 | 1988 c. xxvi | 29 July 1988 |
An Act to authorise the Council of the County of South Glamorgan to construct a highway on a viaduct across the river Taff in the city of Cardiff, highways and other works, and to acquire lands; to confer further powers on the Council; and for other purposes.
| South Yorkshire Light Rail Transit Act 1988 | 1988 c. xxvii | 27 October 1988 |
An Act to empower the South Yorkshire Passenger Transport Executive to develop and operate a system of light rail transit; to authorise the construction of works and the acquisition of land for that purpose; to confer further powers upon the Executive; and for other purposes.
| Harwich Parkeston Quay Act 1988 | 1988 c. xxviii | 27 October 1988 |
An Act to empower Sealink Harbours Limited to construct works and to acquire land at Bath Side Bay, Harwich; to extend the limits of jurisdiction for Parkeston Quay; and for other purposes.
| Northampton Act 1988 | 1988 c. xxix | 15 November 1988 |
An Act to make further provision in relation to rights of burial in the Billing Road Cemetery in the borough of Northampton; to make further provision with regard to the freemen of the borough of Northampton and the Northampton Freemen's Trustees; to alter certain charities; and for other purposes.
| City of Glasgow District Council Order Confirmation Act 1988 | 1988 c. xxx | 20 December 1988 |
An Act to confirm a Provisional Order under the Private Legislation Procedure (Scotland) Act 1936, relating to City of Glasgow District Council.
| | City of Glasgow District Council Order 1988 Provisional Order to re-enact with amendments certain local statutory provisions in force within the City of Glasgow District; to confer further powers on the City of Glasgow District Council; and for other purposes. | |
| Newcastle upon Tyne Town Moor Act 1988 | 1988 c. xxxi | 20 December 1988 |
An Act to repeal the enactments governing the Town Moor in the city of Newcastle upon Tyne and to make new provision for the administration and management of the Town Moor and in respect of the freemen of the said city; and for other purposes.
| Birmingham City Council Act 1988 | 1988 c. xxxii | 20 December 1988 |
An Act to permit the implementation of planning permission in relation to certain land.
| Southern Water Authority Act 1988 | 1988 c. xxxiii | 20 December 1988 |
An Act to provide for the alleviation of flooding in parts of the borough of Ashford within the catchment areas of the Great Stour river and the East Stour river; to authorise the Southern Water Authority to construct works and to acquire lands; to relieve that Authority of certain obligations concerning the Southease bridge over the river Ouse in the county of East Sussex and to modify the powers of the Authority in relation to the Medway navigation; to confer further powers on the Authority; and for other purposes.
| Harwich Harbour Act 1988 | 1988 c. xxxiv | 20 December 1988 |
An Act to confer new powers on the Harwich Harbour Board; to change their name to the Harwich Haven Authority; and for other purposes.

== See also ==
- List of acts of the Parliament of the United Kingdom
