= Energy Act 1983 =

Act of the Parliament of the United Kingdom

Energy Act 1983 (Note: Section 38(1).)
- Act of Parliament
- Parliament of the United Kingdom
- Long title: An Act to amend the law relating to electricity so as to facilitate the generation and supply of electricity by persons other than Electricity Boards, and for certain other purposes; and to amend the law relating to the duties of persons responsible for nuclear installations and to compensation for breach of those duties.
- Citation: 1983 c. 25
- Introduced by: Secretary of State for Energy Nigel Lawson 24 November 1982 (Second Reading) (Commons)
- Territorial extent: England and Wales; Scotland; Northern Ireland (in part); (Note: Section 38(2).)

Dates
- Royal assent: 9 May 1983
- Commencement: 1 June 1983 (Part I and II); 1 September 1983 (Part III); (Note: Section 37.)
Other legislation
Amends	Electric Lighting Act 1882; Electric Lighting (Clauses) Act 1899; Electric Lighting Act 1909; Electricity (Supply) Act 1919; Electricity (Supply) Act 1922; Electricity (Supply) Act 1926; Electricity Supply (Meters) Act 1936; Acquisition of Land (Authorisation Procedure) Act 1946; Electricity Act 1947; Atomic Energy Authority Act 1954; Electricity Reorganisation (Scotland) Act 1954; Clean Air Act 1956; South of Scotland Electricity Order Confirmation Act 1956; Electricity Act 1957; Nuclear Installations Act 1965; Clean Air Act 1968; Nuclear Installations Act 1969; Post Office Act 1969; Chronically Sick and Disabled Persons Act 1970; House of Commons Disqualification Act 1975; Energy Act 1976; Electricity (Scotland) Act 1979; Acquisition of Land Act 1981
Repeals/revokes	Electric Lighting Act 1888
Amended by	Electricity Act 1989
Relates to	Oil and Gas (Enterprise) Act 1982; Nuclear Installations Act 1965

Status: Amended

Text of statute as originally enacted

Revised text of statute as amended

Text of the Energy Act 1983 as in force today (including any amendments) within the United Kingdom, from legislation.gov.uk.

The Energy Act 1983 (c. 25) is an act of the Parliament of the United Kingdom which amended the law to facilitate the generation and supply of electricity other than by Electricity Boards. It also obliged Electricity Boards to adopt combined heat and power schemes. It gave statutory status to the Electricity Consumers' Council. The act defined the duties of persons responsible for nuclear installations and penalties for a breach of those duties.

== Background ==
The Conservative government of the 1980s wished to stimulate the operation of market forces. The Energy Act was an attempt to realise this by encouraging competition in the electricity industry. As the Secretary of State for Energy, Nigel Lawson, stated in Parliament, the Energy Act ‘carries forward the Government's approach to the nationalised industries and the public sector generally. It is our aim, first, to stimulate the operation of market forces and to encourage competition; secondly, to remove artificial constraints on the private sector; thirdly, to open up the possibility for consumers of a choice of supplier; fourthly, to spur the massive State-owned corporations to greater efficiency; and, fifthly, further to diversify the country's sources of energy supply’. But he emphasised that the act ‘is not concerned with the privatisation of the existing nationalised electricity supply industry’; that would come at the end of the decade. The act also encouraged the development of industrial combined heat and power schemes.

== Provisions ==
The Energy Act 1983 (1983 c. 25) received Royal Assent on 9 May 1983. Its long title is ‘An Act to amend the law relating to electricity so as to facilitate the generation and supply of electricity by persons other than Electricity Boards, and for certain other purposes; and to amend the law relating to the duties of persons responsible for nuclear installations and to compensation for breach of those duties’.

The act comprises 38 Sections in 3 Parts and 4 Schedules

PART I Electricity

Private generation and supply

- Section 1 Removal of restrictions on supply etc.
- Section 2 Notice of construction or extension of generating stations
- Section 3 Nuclear-powered generating stations
- Section 4 Hydro-electric generating stations in Scotland
- Section 5 Private generators and Electricity Boards
- Section 6 Charges for supplies by Electricity Boards
- Section 7 Charges for purchases by Electricity Boards
- Section 8 Charges for use of transmission and distribution systems
- Section 9 Disputes as to offers under section 5 etc.
- Section 10 Further provisions as to charges under sections 7 and 8
- Section 11 Arrangements between Electricity Boards
- Section 12 Meters to be of approved pattern
- Section 13 Duty of Boards to supply
- Section 14 Inspection and testing of lines etc.

Miscellaneous and general

- Section 15 Amendments relating to meters
- Section 16 Regulations relating to supply and safety
- Section 17 Charges for availability of supply
- Section 18 Purchases by Electricity Boards from local authorities
- Section 19 Combined heat and power
- Section 20 Abolition of rights of entry
- Section 21 The Electricity Consumers' Council
- Section 22 Functions of other bodies in relation to Electricity Consumers' Council
- Section 23 Offences
- Section 24 Regulations: general
- Section 25 Amendments
- Section 26 Interpretation of Part I

PART II Nuclear Installations

- Section 27 Limitation of operators' liability
- Section 28 General cover for compensation
- Section 29 Carriage of nuclear matter
- Section 30 Provisions supplementary to sections 27 to 29
- Section 31 Reciprocal enforcement of judgments
- Section 32 Meaning of "excepted matter"
- Section 33 Extension to territories outside United Kingdom
- Section 34 United Kingdom Atomic Energy Authority

PART III General

- Section 35 Financial provisions
- Section 36 Repeals
- Section 37 Commencement
- Section 38 Short title and extent

Schedules

- Schedule 1 Electricity : Amendments Relating to Meters
- Schedule 2 The Electricity Consumers' Council
- Schedule 3 Electricity : Minor and Consequential Amendments
- Schedule 4 Enactments Repealed

== Effects and consequences ==
The purpose of the Part I of the act was to promote competition in the domestic electricity market by encouraging private generation and supply. It entitled private generators of electricity to sell their electricity to the local electricity board. It thereby gave them a guaranteed market. It also allowed them to use the public transmission and distribution system.

The Oil and Gas (Enterprise) Act 1982 had opened up the public gas supply system to competition from the private sector. The pipelines of the British Gas Corporation were used to transmit and distribute other suppliers' gas. The Energy Act 1983 extended this approach into the supply of electricity. It was recognised that the Energy Act 1983 did not have a significant effect. It did not lead to an increase in private power generation. However, it did set the scene for more radical reforms at the end of the 1980s including the privatisation of the electricity industry implemented from 1989.

Part II of the act updated the Nuclear Installations (Amendment) Act 1965, which had subsequently been consolidated into the Nuclear Installations Act 1965. Over the years the penalties prescribed by the acts had lost much of their value through inflation. The purpose of the 1983 Act was to restore the real value of the amounts of compensation that the 1965 Act provides for damage caused by nuclear incidents.

Part III of the act repealed the whole of the Electric Lighting Act 1888 (51 & 52 Vict. c. 12) and amended certain sections of the Electric Lighting (Clauses) Act 1899 (62 & 63 Vict. c. 19).

== Subsequent legislation ==
Sections 1 to 26 of the Energy Act 1983 were repealed by the Electricity Act 1989.

Schedules 1 to 3 of the Energy Act 1983 were repealed by the Electricity Act 1989.

== See also ==
- Oil and Gas (Enterprise) Act 1982
- Electricity Act 1989
- Timeline of the UK electricity supply industry
