= Electricity (Supply) Act 1922 =

Act of the Parliament of the United Kingdom

Electricity (Supply) Act 1922 (Note: Section 31(1).)
- Act of Parliament
- Parliament of the United Kingdom
- Long title: An Act to amend the law with respect to the supply of electricity.
- Citation: 12 & 13 Geo. 5. c. 46
- Territorial extent: England and Wales; Scotland; (Note: Section 31(2).)

Dates
- Royal assent: 4 August 1922
- Commencement: 4 August 1922 (Note: The Acts of Parliament (Commencement) Act 1793.)
- Repealed: 31 March 1990 (Note: The Electricity Act 1989 (Commencement No. 2) Order 1990 (SI 1990/117).)
Other legislation
Amends	Electricity (Supply) Act 1919
Amended by	Electricity (Supply) Act 1933; Local Government Act 1933; Local Government (Scotland) Act 1947; Electricity Act 1947; Energy Act 1983
Repealed by	Electricity Act 1989

Status: Repealed

Text of statute as originally enacted

The Electricity (Supply) Act 1922 (12 & 13 Geo. 5. c. 46) was an act of the Parliament of the United Kingdom which amended the law on the supply of electricity. This act was construed as one with the Electricity (Supply) Acts 1882 to 1919, and was cited as the Electricity (Supply) Acts 1882 to 1922. It established the powers of electricity authorities to borrow money for the construction and operation of electricity generating and transmission systems; it amended some sections of the Electricity (Supply) Act 1919 (9 & 10 Geo. 5. c. 100) relating to electricity districts and joint electricity authorities; it empowered electricity authorities to provide a supply to railway companies; and established methods of reclaiming expenses of various statutory bodies.

== Background ==
The Electricity (Supply) Act 1919 (9 & 10 Geo. 5. c. 100) It had provided for the establishment of the Electricity Commissioners (sections 1–3), and their duty to determine electricity districts (section 5). The act also provided for the establishment of joint electricity authorities (section 8).

The Electricity Commissioners had started work in January 1920 and had identified fifteen electricity districts across the country. However, the establishment of joint electricity authorities (JEAs) was problematic. JEAs were set up on a voluntary basis, and they were largely supported by local authority electricity undertakings. But power companies thought that the JEAs would take over their functions and therefore opposed their establishment.

One of the intentions of the 1922 act was therefore to allow the JEAs to have appropriate financial powers and to protect the interests of the power companies.

Following the enactment of the 1919 act there were several wider issues that affected the efficient operation of the British electricity supply industry. During the passage of the Electricity (Supply) Bill through Parliament in 1919, the Conservatives had opposed the bill's proposals for the formation of district electricity boards with their compulsory purchase powers to take over generation and to provide interconnections. Members of the Conservative Party were suspicious of ‘schemes which smacked of nationalisation’, and more widely opposed state intervention in industrial affairs, the powers of compulsion of the Electricity Commissioners were curtailed.

The period from 1919 to 1926 has been characterised as 'the diagnosis of failure' of the British electricity supply industry. The Electricity Commissioners admitted that their activities had met with only limited success, as they had been involved in interminable rounds of public inquiries. Lack of powers of compulsion and municipal pride had militated again cooperation between local authority undertakings. There were also concerns about the dominance of power companies and larger local authorities.

While the 1922 act dealt with some of these issues, the problems of integration and cooperation were addressed later by the Electricity (Supply) Act 1926 (16 & 17 Geo. 5. c. 51).

== Provisions ==
The act comprised 31 sections as follows.

- Section 1 gave joint electricity authorities (JEAs) the power to borrow money for purchasing plant, undertaking works or as working capital.
- Section 2 allowed JEAs or local authorities to establish a sinking fund for new works.
- Section 3 gave the Electricity Commissioners the authority to authorise JEAs to issue stock.
- Section 4 gave JEAs the power to issue stock to discharge the purchase price of generating plant or transmission lines.
- Section 5 empowered undertakings to give financial assistance to a JEA or other body.
- Section 6 empowered undertakings to lease undertakings to JEAs.
- Section 7 allowed the Electricity Commissioners to cover their expenses by charging JEAs or power companies.
- Section 8 allowed methods of payment of purchase price payable to local authorities.
- Section 9 permitted JEAs to use transmission lines.
- Section 10 allowed JEAs to dispose of works not required.
- Section 11 allowed JEAs or undertakers to continue way-leaves.
- Section 12 allowed undertakings to continue to operate generating stations after transfer to a JEA.
- Section 13 set conditions for restrictions to take a supply of electricity.
- Section 14 allowed the Electricity Commissioners to suspend powers of purchase of undertakings.
- Section 15 permitted the wider exercise of powers and duties.
- Section 16 limited the power of JEAs over power companies.
- Section 17 allowed the Electricity Commissioners to limit the supply area of power companies.
- Section 18 set limits on prices charged.
- Section 19 amended section 5 of the Electricity (Supply) Act 1919, concerning the determination of electricity districts.
- Section 20 amended section 6 of the Electricity (Supply) Act 1919, concerning the establishment of joint electricity authorities.
- Section 21 amended section 16 of the Electricity (Supply) Act 1919.
- Section 22 defined methods of charging and revision of prices.
- Section 23 made provision for standby supplies of electricity.
- Section 24 made provision for supplies to be given to railway companies.
- Section 25 allowed persons not being undertakings to supply electricity.
- Section 26 allowed payment of debentures.
- Section 27 provided for the winding up of companies.
- Section 28 detailed the expenses of the London County Council.
- Section 29 provided for payment to Scottish local authorities.
- Section 30 applied the act to Scotland.
- Section 31 Construction and extent.

== Operation of the act ==
The 1922 act resulted in the establishment of JEAs, however only four were constituted, namely:

- North Wales & South Cheshire JEA, formed 1923
- London and Home Counties JEA, formed 1925
- West Midlands JEA, formed 1925
- North West Midlands JEA, formed 1928.

== Subsequent developments ==
The Electricity (Supply) Act 1926 (16 & 17 Geo. 5. c. 51) established the Central Electricity Board.

The Electricity Act 1947 (10 & 11 Geo. 6. c. 54), nationalised the UK electricity supply industry. The Electricity Commissioners, the power companies, and the joint electricity authorities were abolished. The ownership of electricity generation and transmission facilities was vested in the British Electricity Authority.

== See also ==
- Electric Lighting Acts 1882 to 1909
- Electricity (Supply) Act 1919
- Electricity (Supply) Act 1926
- Electricity (Supply) Act 1935
- Electricity Act 1947
- Electricity Act 1957
- Electricity Act 1989
- Timeline of the UK electricity supply industry
