= Electricity (Financial Provisions) (Scotland) Act 1988 =

Act of the Parliament of the United Kingdom

Electricity (Financial Provisions) (Scotland) Act 1988 (Note: Section 2.)
- Act of Parliament
- Parliament of the United Kingdom
- Long title: An Act to raise the financial limit imposed by and by virtue of section 29(1) of the Electricity (Scotland) Act 1979.
- Citation: 1988 c. 37
- Introduced by: Lord Sanderson of Bowden on 27 July 1988 (Second Reading) (Lords)
- Territorial extent: Scotland (Note: Section 2.)

Dates
- Royal assent: 29 July 1988
- Commencement: 29 July 1988 (Note: Section 4(b) of the Interpretation Act 1978.)
- Repealed: 31 March 1990 (Note: The Electricity Act 1989 (Commencement No. 2) Order 1990 (SI 1990/117).)
Other legislation
Amends	Electricity (Scotland) Act 1979
Repeals/revokes	Electricity (Financial Provisions) (Scotland) Act 1982; section 40(5) of the Electricity (Scotland) Act 1979
Repealed by	Electricity Act 1989

Status: Repealed

Text of statute as originally enacted

The Electricity (Financial Provisions) (Scotland) Act 1988 (c. 37) was an act of the Parliament of the United Kingdom which raised the financial limit of Scottish electricity boards imposed by earlier legislation.

== Background ==
Section 29(1) of the Electricity (Scotland) Act 1979 imposed a limit of £2,300 million on stocks, loans and financial advances held by the Scottish electricity boards. This limit was increased to £2,700 million by the Electricity (Borrowing Powers) (Scotland) Order 1985 (SI 1985/1253).

The act increased this limit to £3,000 million.

== Provisions ==
The Electricity (Financial Provisions) (Scotland) Act 1988 received royal assent on 29 July 1988. Its long title is ‘An Act to raise the financial limit imposed by and by virtue of section 29(1) of the Electricity (Scotland) Act 1979.’

The act comprised two sections:

- Section 1 Limit on borrowing etc. of the Scottish Electricity Boards. Increased the financial limit on stocks held and borrowing to £3,000 million, and repealed the Electricity (Financial Provisions) (Scotland) Act 1982 and section 40(5) of the Electricity (Scotland) Act 1979.
- Section 2 Short title and extent. The act extended only to Scotland.

== Effects of the act ==
The effects of the act were:

- Increased the financial limit on borrowing of the Scottish electricity boards to £3,000 million,
- Repealed the Electricity (Financial Provisions) (Scotland) Act 1982,
- Repealed section 40(5) of the Electricity (Scotland) Act 1979.

== Subsequent developments ==
The whole act was repealed by section 112(4) of, and schedule 18 to, the Electricity Act 1989, which came into force on 31 March 1990.

== See also ==
- Timeline of the UK electricity supply industry
