= Statutory Gas Companies (Electricity Supply Powers) Act 1925 =

Act of the Parliament of the United Kingdom

Statutory Gas Companies (Electricity Supply Powers) Act 1925 (Note: Section 4.)
- Act of Parliament
- Parliament of the United Kingdom
- Long title: An Act to facilitate the supply of electricity by statutory gas companies.
- Citation: 15 & 16 Geo. 5. c. 44
- Introduced by: Lord Raglan on 25 June 1925 (Second Reading) (Lords)
- Territorial extent: United Kingdom

Dates
- Royal assent: 31 July 1925
- Commencement: 31 July 1925 (Note: The Acts of Parliament (Commencement) Act 1793.)
- Repealed: 1 August 1948
Other legislation
Repealed by	Electricity Act 1947

Status: Repealed

Text of statute as originally enacted

The Statutory Gas Companies (Electricity Supply Powers) Act 1925 (15 & 16 Geo. 5. c. 44) was an act of the Parliament of the United Kingdom which facilitated the supply of electricity by gas companies.

== Background ==
The spread of electricity supplies in rural areas in the UK had been limited because of the cost distribution infrastructure. Yet, the advantages of using electricity for lighting rather than gas were recognised. Gas companies were able to use surplus power from the gas making process to generate and supply electricity. Twenty-four gas companies had, by 1925, obtained legal powers to supply electricity. However, this required the company to promote a Bill in Parliament which was a prohibitive cost for smaller gas companies.

The aim of the act was to enable statutory gas companies to apply for special orders under the Electricity Acts. It enabled companies to raise capital or borrow money to provide an electricity supply. The Electricity Commissioners were empowered to grant money control powers to gas companies, including those already authorised to supply electricity.

== Provisions ==
The act comprised four sections:

- Section 1 Granting Electricity Orders to statutory gas companies
- Section 2 Providing capital powers to statutory gas companies
- Section 3 Definition of statutory gas companies
- Section 4 Short title

== Subsequent developments ==
To deal with the applications for financial powers the Electricity Commissioners made Rules of Procedure. These were enacted by the Electricity Commissioners (Statutory Gas Companies Capital Powers) Rules 1926. A schedule of Special Orders is listed in Appendix K of the Electricity Commissioner Sixth Annual Report 1926.

The whole act was repealed by section 57(7) of, and schedule 5 to, the Electricity Act 1947 (10 & 11 Geo. 6. c. 54), which came into force on 1 August 1948.

== See also ==
- Timeline of the UK electricity supply industry
- Electricity Commissioners
