= Electricity Supply (Meters) Act 1936 =

Act of the Parliament of the United Kingdom

Electricity Supply (Meters) Act 1936 (Note: Section 5(1).)
- Act of Parliament
- Parliament of the United Kingdom
- Long title: An Act to make better provision for the measurement of electricity supplied by authorised undertakers.
- Citation: 26 Geo. 5 & 1 Edw. 8. c. 20
- Introduced by: Lord Eltisley 24 March 1936 (Second Reading) (Lords)
- Territorial extent: England and Wales; Scotland; (Note: Section 5(2).)

Dates
- Royal assent: 29 May 1936
- Commencement: 29 May 1936 (Note: The Acts of Parliament (Commencement) Act 1793.)
- Repealed: 31 March 1990 (Note: The Electricity Act 1989 (Commencement No. 2) Order 1990 (SI 1990/117).)
Other legislation
Amends	Electric Lighting (Clauses) Act 1899
Amended by	Electricity Act 1947; Electricity Supply (Meters) Act 1952; Statute Law (Repeals) Act 1971; Energy Act 1983
Repealed by	Electricity Act 1989

Status: Repealed

Text of statute as originally enacted

The Electricity Supply (Meters) Act 1936 (26 Geo. 5 & 1 Edw. 8. c. 20) was an act of the Parliament of the United Kingdom which regulated the provision and examination of electricity meters used by authorised electricity undertakings. It placed duties on the Electricity Commissioners to appoint meter examiners to examine and certify meters; and on electricity undertakings to supply and maintain apparatus to examine, test and regulate meters. The act established that meters already in use on the appointed day (1 July 1938) be deemed as proper meters to measure the supply of electricity.

== Background ==
In July 1935 a judgment in the Court of Appeal was given in the case of Joseph v. East Ham Corporation. The case arose from a dispute between the corporation and a consumer concerning the amount of electricity consumed. The consumer declined to pay the full account and claimed the electricity meter must have registered the wrong amount. The corporation cut off the electricity supply; but the consumer issued a writ claiming an injunction against the corporation. This was heard in the county court which ruled there was a bona fide dispute and the corporation had wrongly cut off the supply.

The corporation appealed to the Court of Appeal which held that an electricity inspector had never been appointed by East Ham Corporation; it followed that the consumer's electricity meter was not certified and it was not possible for the corporation to say that there was a sum due for the electricity consumed. The Court of Appeal held that the corporation had no right to cut off the supply and dismissed the appeal.

To regularise this position, which applied nationally, the Electricity Commissioners considered the steps that would need to be taken to appoint electricity inspectors to certify meters. The commissioners' deliberations were pre-empted by the electricity associations which introduced a private members bill into the House of Commons in February 1936 to regulate the appointment of inspectors to examine and certify meters.

== Provisions ==
The Electricity Supply (Meters) Act 1936 received royal assent on 29 May 1936.

- Section 1 of the act provides for the appointment by the Electricity Commissioners of competent and impartial meter examiners to examine and certify meters used by undertakings; and that examiners shall comply with any directions given by the commissioners.
- Section 2 places on electricity undertakers the duty to supply and maintain apparatus to examine, test and regulate meters; and to provide facilities for the use of such apparatus.
- Section 3 established that meters already in use on the appointed day shall be deemed as proper meters to measure supply until such meters are first disconnected and removed, or after 10 years, whichever first occurs.
- The Electricity Commissioners had a duty to appoint Meter Examiners and make arrangements for the carrying out of their duties. They also had a duty to approve suitable apparatus to examine, test and regulate meters. The commissioners could prescribe fees to be paid by undertakings or a consumer for a meter examiner to examine or certify any meter.
- The commissioners had to be satisfied that where testing apparatus was not provided by an individual undertaking that two or more undertakings shall make arrangements to put into effect arrangement under Section 2 of the act.

The act allowed a transitional period to enable the appointment of examiners, the establishment of headquarters, and testing stations. An 'appointed day' was established when the full provisions of the act would come into force: the appointed day was 1 July 1938.

== Consequential provisions ==
The Electricity Commissioners published two papers relating to the Electricity Supply (Meters) Act 1936.

- Explanatory Memorandum concerning the testing of electricity meters; the apparatus approved for use in meter testing stations and the procedure proposed by the Electricity Commissioners for the certification of meters.
- Approved Apparatus for Testing Stations

The commissioners would not approve certain types of meters such as commutator ampere-hour meters and multi-phase meters used on single phase circuits.

In 1937 the commissioners prescribed error limits for meters of +2.5% and –3.5 %.

=== Transitional arrangements ===
The transitional arrangements of the actexpired on 30 June 1948. However, no testing was undertaken during the war, there was therefore a back-log of examinations and replacements. It was necessary in 1947 to postpone the date until 30 June 1953.

By 1952 it was realised that examination or replacement of meters would not be achieved by the deadline. A new statute was enacted to extend the deadline by 5 years.

==== Electricity Supply (Meters) Act 1952 ====
Electricity Supply (Meters) Act 1952 (Note: Section 2(1).)
- Act of Parliament
- Parliament of the United Kingdom
- Long title: An Act to extend by five years the period at the expiration of which section three of the Electricity Supply (Meters) Act, 1936, is to cease to apply to any electricity meters.
- Citation: 15 & 16 Geo. 6 & 1 Eliz. 2. c. 32
- Territorial extent: England and Wales; Scotland; (Note: Section 2(2).)

Dates
- Royal assent: 26 June 1952
- Commencement: 26 June 1952
- Expired: 30 June 1958 (Note: Section 1.)
- Repealed: 27 July 1971
Other legislation
Amends	Electricity Supply (Meters) Act 1936
Repealed by	Statute Law (Repeals) Act 1971

Status: Repealed

Text of statute as originally enacted

The Electricity Supply (Meters) Act 1952 (15 & 16 Geo. 6 & 1 Eliz. 2. c. 32) postponed from 30 June 1953, to 30 June 1958, the date when all electricity meters in use have to be certified. The 1952 act was repealed by the Statute Law (Repeals) Act 1971 as expired legislation.

== Repeal ==
The whole act was repealed by section 112(4) of, and schedule 18, of the Electricity Act 1989, which came into force on 31 March 1990 and privatised the electricity industry.

== See also ==
- Electricity (Supply) Act 1935
- Electricity Act 1947
- Electricity Act 1989
- Timeline of the UK electricity supply industry
