= Access to Medical Reports Act 1988 =

Act of the Parliament of the United Kingdom

Access to Medical Reports Act 1988 (Note: Section 10(1).)
- Act of Parliament
- Parliament of the United Kingdom
- Long title: An Act to establish a right of access by individuals to reports relating to themselves provided by medical practitioners for employment or insurance purposes and to make provision for related matters.
- Citation: 1988 c. 28
- Territorial extent: England and Wales; Scotland; (Note: Section 10(4).)

Dates
- Royal assent: 29 July 1988
- Commencement: 1 January 1989 (Note: Section 10(2).)
Other legislation
Amended by	Data Protection Act 1998; Financial Services and Markets Act 2000 (Consequential Amendments and Repeals) Order 2001; Financial Services Act 2012; Crime and Courts Act 2013; Data Protection Act 2018; EEA Passport Rights (Amendment, etc., and Transitional Provisions) (EU Exit) Regulations 2018
Relates to	Access to Personal Files and Medical Reports (Northern Ireland) Order 1991

Status: Amended

Text of statute as originally enacted

Revised text of statute as amended

Text of the Access to Medical Reports Act 1988 as in force today (including any amendments) within the United Kingdom, from legislation.gov.uk.

The Access to Medical Reports Act 1988 (c. 28) is an act of the Parliament of the United Kingdom which applies to people in England, Wales and Scotland. It came into effect on 1 January 1989.

It gives patients the right to see reports written about them by a doctor for employment or insurance purposes with whom they have a normal doctor-patient relationship. Patients can see a report before it is submitted and request changes. Access to a report can be withheld if the doctor thinks it likely to cause serious harm to the physical or mental health of the individual or others or indicate the intentions of the practitioner in respect of the individual, or to reveal the identity of another person who has supplied information.

The Access to Personal Files and Medical Reports (Northern Ireland) Order 1991 has similar effects.

== Provisions ==
Section 1 of the act gives an individual the right to have access, in accordance with the act, to any medical report relating to the individual which is to be, or has been, supplied by a medical practitioner for employment purposes or insurance purposes. Section 2 of the act defines the terms used, including "medical report", which means a report relating to the physical or mental health of the individual prepared by a medical practitioner who is or has been responsible for the clinical care of the individual.

Section 3 of the act prevents a person from applying to a medical practitioner for a medical report on an individual for employment or insurance purposes unless the applicant has notified the individual of the proposed application and the individual has consented to it. The notification must inform the individual of the right to withhold consent and of the other rights under the act. Section 4 of the act allows the individual, when consenting, to state that he or she wishes to have access to the report before it is supplied. The practitioner must then not supply the report until access has been given, or until 21 days have passed without the individual communicating about arrangements for access. Access means making the report or a copy available for inspection, or supplying a copy, for which the practitioner may charge a reasonable fee.

Section 5 of the act provides that a report to which the individual has been given access under section 4 must not be supplied unless the individual consents. Before consenting, the individual may ask in writing for any part of the report that is incorrect or misleading to be amended, and if the practitioner declines, may require a statement of the individual's views to be attached to the report. Section 6 of the act requires a practitioner to retain a copy of a report supplied for employment or insurance purposes for at least six months, and to give the individual access to any such report supplied in the previous six months if asked.

Section 7 of the act relieves the practitioner of the obligation to give access to any part of a report whose disclosure would in the practitioner's opinion be likely to cause serious harm to the physical or mental health of the individual or others, or would indicate the practitioner's intentions in respect of the individual, or would be likely to reveal information about another person or the identity of a person who supplied information about the individual, unless that person has consented or is a health professional involved in the individual's care. Where the exemption applies to the whole report, the practitioner must not supply it unless the individual consents. Section 8 of the act allows a court to order a person to comply with a requirement of the act on the application of an individual, with jurisdiction exercisable by the county court or, in Scotland, the sheriff.

Section 9 of the act requires notifications to be in writing, and allows them to be given by post. Section 10 of the act provides the short title, brings the act into force on 1 January 1989, provides that it does not apply to a medical report prepared before then, and provides that it does not extend to Northern Ireland.

== Subsequent developments ==
The definition of "insurance purposes" in section 2(1) of the act was replaced, with effect from 1 December 2001, by article 311 of the Financial Services and Markets Act 2000 (Consequential Amendments and Repeals) Order 2001 (SI 2001/3649), so that it refers to the purposes of an insurer with permission under the Financial Services and Markets Act 2000 to effect or carry out contracts of insurance.
