= Electricity (Supply) Act 1933 =

Act of the Parliament of the United Kingdom

Electricity (Supply) Act 1933 (Note: Section 3.)
- Act of Parliament
- Parliament of the United Kingdom
- Long title: An Act to amend section sixteen of the Electricity (Supply) Act, 1919, and section twenty-one of the Electricity (Supply) Act, 1922
- Citation: 23 & 24 Geo. 5. c. 46

Dates
- Royal assent: 28 July 1933
- Commencement: 28 July 1933 (Note: The Acts of Parliament (Commencement) Act 1793.)
- Repealed: 31 March 1948
Other legislation
Amends	Electricity (Supply) Act 1919; Electricity (Supply) Act 1922
Repealed by	Electricity Act 1947

Status: Repealed

Text of statute as originally enacted

The Electricity (Supply) Act 1933 (23 & 24 Geo. 5. c. 46) was an act of the Parliament of the United Kingdom which amended certain sections of the Electricity (Supply) Act 1919 (9 & 10 Geo. 5. c. 100) and the Electricity (Supply) Act 1922 (12 & 13 Geo. 5. c. 46).

== Background ==
A conference of local authorities in London that owned and operated electricity undertakings had been held. A significant issue was the cost of promoting parliamentary bills. A new measure was proposed to enact and make more applicable provisions which had been included in several local acts.

== Provisions ==
The act comprised three sections.

- Section 1. To amend section sixteen of the Electricity (Supply) Act 1919. Wording included reference to improvement of electricity supply and agreements between electricity undertakers.
- Section 2. To amend section twenty-one of the Electricity (Supply) Act 1922. Wording included change in the method of operation and determination by the Electricity Commissioners.
- Section 3. Short title, construction and citation.

== Subsequent developments ==
The whole act was repealed by section 57() of, and the fifth schedule to, the Electricity Act 1947 (10 & 11 Geo. 6. c. 54), which came into force on 31 March 1948. The 1947 act nationalised the British electricity supply industry.
