= Electricity and Gas Act 1963 =

Act of the Parliament of the United Kingdom

Electricity and Gas Act 1963 (Note: Section 4(1).)
- Act of Parliament
- Parliament of the United Kingdom
- Long title: An Act to increase the statutory limits imposed on the amounts outstanding in respect of borrowings by the Electricity Council and Electricity Boards and the Gas Council and Area Gas Boards; to make further provision for Exchequer advances to certain of those bodies; to provide in certain cases for compensating members of those bodies for loss of office; and for purposes connected with the matters aforesaid.
- Citation: 1963 c. 59
- Introduced by: Minister of Power, Frederick J. Erroll, 29 November 1963 (Second Reading) (Commons)
- Territorial extent: United Kingdom

Dates
- Royal assent: 18 December 1963
- Commencement: 18 December 1963 (Note: The Acts of Parliament (Commencement) Act 1793.)
- Repealed: 31 March 1990 (Note: The Electricity Act 1989 (Commencement No. 2) Order 1990 (SI 1990/117).)
Other legislation
Amends	Electricity Act 1947; Gas Act 1948; Finance Act 1956; Electricity Act 1957; Gas Act 1960; Finance Act 1963
Repeals/revokes	Electricity (Borrowing Powers) Act 1959; Electricity (Borrowing Powers) Act 1962
Amended by	Gas (Borrowing Powers) Act 1965; National Loans Act 1968; Gas and Electricity Act 1968; Electricity Act 1972; Statute Law (Repeals) Act 1974; Electricity (Scotland) Act 1979
Repealed by	Electricity Act 1989

Status: Repealed

Text of statute as originally enacted

The Electricity and Gas Act 1963 (c. 59) was an act of the Parliament of the United Kingdom which increased the amounts that could be borrowed by the Electricity Council, the electricity boards, the Gas Council, and the area gas boards. It enabled monetary advances to be made to these bodies, and provided for members of the bodies to be recompensed.

== Background ==
Reports on the gas industry in 1960 and the electricity industry in 1963 had been published by the Parliamentary Select Committee on Nationalised Industries. Both reports provided insights into the progress and problems of the industries. They identified that future expenditure was likely to be greater than budgeted by earlier legislation. The act aimed to address this by increasing the borrowing powers of the Electricity Council and boards in England and Wales, for the Scottish electricity boards, and for the Gas Council and its boards. It raised the amounts to a limit likely to be reached in about three years which would provide an opportunity for Parliament to review the progress of each industry at approximately three-year intervals.

The act permitted the Minister of Power to make Treasury advances to the Gas and Electricity Councils and to the Scottish boards. It also enabled compensation to be provided to a council or board member who leaves before their term of office had expired.

== Electricity and Gas Act 1963 ==
The Electricity and Gas Act 1963 (c. 59) received royal assent on 18 December 1963. Its long title is ‘An Act to increase the statutory limits imposed on the amounts outstanding in respect of borrowings by the Electricity Council and Electricity Boards and the Gas Council and Area Gas Boards; to make further provision for Exchequer advances to certain of those bodies; to provide in certain cases for compensating members of those bodies for loss of office; and for purposes connected with the matters aforesaid’.

=== Provisions ===
The act comprises four sections and three schedules

- Section 1 Extension of borrowing powers
- Section 2 Exchequer advances to Electricity and Gas Councils and to Scottish Electricity Boards
- Section 3 Payments to members of Councils and Boards of compensation for loss of office.
- Section 4 Short title, repeal and consequential provision.
- Schedule 1 Amendments relating to Exchequer advances
- Schedule 2 Enactments Repealed
- Schedule 3 Section 47(7) of the Electricity Act 1947 as amended.

== Effects of the act ==
The borrowing powers of the Electricity Council, the Central Electricity Generating Board and area electricity boards were increased from £1,400 million (specified in Section 15(5) of the Electricity Act 1957) to £3,300 million or a greater amount not exceeding £4,400 million. The borrowing powers of the Gas Council and area gas boards were increased from £250 million (specified in Section 42(3) of the Gas Act 1948) to £600 million or a greater amount not exceeding £50 million.

The act repealed the Electricity (Borrowing Powers) Act 1959 (7 & 8 Eliz. 2. c. 20); and the Electricity (Borrowing Powers) Act 1962 (11 & 12 Eliz. 2. c. 7); and Section 1 of the Gas Act 1960 (8 & 9 Eliz. 2. c. 27).

== Subsequent developments ==
The act was amended by the Gas (Borrowing Powers) Act 1965 which set a new budget of £900 million which could be increased to £1,200 million. The act was also amended by the Gas and Electricity Act 1968; and by the Electricity Act 1972.

Schedule 2 to the act was repealed by section 1 of, and part XI of the schedule to, the Statute Law (Repeals) Act 1974, which came into force on 27 June 1974.

The whole act was repealed by the Electricity Act 1989, which came into force on 31 March 1990.

== See also ==
- Gas Boards
- Gas Council
- Central Electricity Generating Board
- Electricity Council
