= Electricity (Supply) Act 1926 =

Act of the Parliament of the United Kingdom

Electricity (Supply) Act 1926 (Note: Section 52(1).)
- Act of Parliament
- Parliament of the United Kingdom
- Long title: An Act to amend the law with respect to the supply of electricity.
- Citation: 16 & 17 Geo. 5. c. 51
- Introduced by: Wilfrid Ashley, Minister of Transport, 10 March 1926 (Commons)
- Territorial extent: England and Wales; Scotland; (Note: Section 52(2).)

Dates
- Royal assent: 15 December 1926
- Commencement: 15 December 1926 (Note: The Acts of Parliament (Commencement) Act 1793.)
- Repealed: 31 March 1990 (Note: The Electricity Act 1989 (Commencement No. 2) Order 1990 (SI 1990/117).)
Other legislation
Amends	Electric Lighting Acts 1882 to 1909; Electric Lighting (Clauses) Act 1899
Amended by	Electricity (Supply) Act 1935; Electricity Act 1947; Water Resources Act 1963; Statute Law (Repeals) Act 1978; Ancient Monuments and Archaeological Areas Act 1979; Statute Law (Repeals) Act 1981; Energy Act 1983
Repealed by	Electricity Act 1989

Status: Repealed

Text of statute as originally enacted

The Electricity (Supply) Act 1926 (16 & 17 Geo. 5. c. 51) was an act of the Parliament of the United Kingdom which amended the law on the supply of electricity. Its long title is: ‘An Act to amend the law with respect to the supply of electricity’. The act was construed as one with the Electricity (Supply) Acts 1882 to 1922, and was cited as the Electricity (Supply) Acts 1882 to 1926. It established a statutory body, the Central Electricity Board (CEB), ‘with the duty of supplying electricity to authorised undertakers’ and to ‘appoint consultative technical committees’. It provided for the Electricity Commissioners to prepare and transmit to the CEB ‘electricity schemes’ for relevant areas, and which identified the most efficient ‘selected’ generating stations which were to be used to generate electricity for the Board. The act provided for ‘main transmission line’ interconnections between selected stations and undertakings; and to standardise the frequency of generation; and other purposes. The provisions of the act enabled the construction of the National Grid.

== Background ==
In the early 1920s there were several issues that affected the efficient operation of the British electricity supply industry. These included the limited powers of the statutory bodies, the 'diagnosis of failure' and the plethora of operating frequencies.

=== Limited powers ===
During the passage of the Electricity (Supply) Bill through Parliament in 1919, the Conservatives had opposed the bill’s proposals for the formation of district electricity boards with their compulsory purchase powers to take over generation and to provide interconnections. Members of the Conservative Party were suspicious of ‘schemes which smacked of nationalisation’, and more widely opposed state intervention in industrial affairs. The proposals for district electricity boards were replaced with joint electricity authorities which were voluntary and lacked purchasing powers. Similarly the powers of compulsion of the Electricity Commissioners were curtailed.

=== 'Diagnosis of failure' ===
The period from 1919 to 1926 has been characterised as ‘the diagnosis of failure’ of the British electricity supply industry. The Electricity Commissioners admitted that their activities had met with only limited success, as they had been involved in interminable rounds of public inquiries. Lack of powers of compulsion and municipal pride had militated again cooperation between local authority undertakings. There was also concerns about the dominance of power companies and larger local authorities. Only four joint electricity authorities had been created, and then only after the passage of the Electricity (Supply) Act 1922 which enabled joint electricity authorities to borrow money to finance electricity schemes.

=== Standardisation of frequency ===
The issue of different operating currents and frequencies had inhibited the integration of systems. In 1923 there were 109 undertakings which only supplied AC, 176 supplied AC and DC, and 207 supplied DC only. Of those supplying AC there were 223 undertakings which distributed current at 50 Hz, but a further 82 undertakings which distributed current at a range of frequencies, as shown in the table.

Variety of operating frequencies
Frequency, Hz	25	33 1/3	40	50	60	67.5	70	75	77	80	83	83.5	85	87.5	90	93	100
No. of undertakings	27	1	19	223	7	1	1	1	1	3	2	1	2	1	1	1	13

The standardisation of frequency was a specific requirement of sections 4 (1)(c) and section 9 of the 1926 act.

=== Weir report ===
To address the above issues, in January 1925 a committee was established under the chairmanship of Lord Weir ‘to review the national problem of the supply of electrical energy’. The committee reported in May 1925 and their recommendations formed the basis of the 1926 act which was introduced into Parliament on 10 March 1926. The passage of the bill was not without problems. The general strike disrupted the political process in May 1926. Conservative back benchers tabled amendments to limit the powers of the proposed CEB, extending the committee stage from April to July. The government presented the proposals to the public as inaugurating a period of cheap electricity. The final stages of the bill through the House of Lords was championed by Lord Weir.

== Provisions ==
The act comprised 52 sections and seven schedules as follows.

=== Constitution and general powers of Central Electricity Board ===
A Central Electricity Board shall be established, consisting of a chairman and seven other persons (section 1). The Board shall supply electricity to authorised undertakers (section 2). The Board may appoint one or more consultative technical committees (section 3).

=== Provisions as to Scheme ===
Electricity Commissioners are to prepare and transmit to the board ‘schemes’ for relevant areas identifying which ‘selected’ generating stations were to be used to generate electricity for the Board (section 4 (1)(a); providing for ‘main transmission line’ interconnections between selected stations and undertakings (section 4 (1)(b); and to standardise the frequency of generation (section 4 (1)(c). Existing and new selected stations (section 5 and 6). Obligations and rights for selected stations (section 7). Main transmission lines (section 8). Frequency standardisation (section 9). Obligations of the Board (section 10). Tariffs and prices (section 11 to 13). Power to close generating stations (section 14). Compensation (section 15). Authorised undertakers (section 16). Provisions (section 17). Consents (section 18). Provisions for London (section 19).

=== Subsidiary provisions as to the Board ===
Application of Electricity Acts (section 20). Acquisition of land (section 21). Use of transmission lines (section 22). Purchase of surplus electricity (section 23). Annual report (section 25).

=== Financial Provisions ===
Expenses, borrowing, issue of stock, Treasury guarantees, accounts and audit (sections 26 to 30).

=== Miscellaneous Provisions ===
Charges, superannuation, clearing lines, bridge protection (sections 31 to 35).

=== Amendments of the Electricity Supply Acts ===
Sections 36 to 50.

=== General ===
Interpretation and construction (Sections 51 and 52).

Schedules 1 to 7.

== Subsequent developments ==
The act resulted in the first effective national coordination of electricity supplies. The Central Electricity Board (CEB) purchased the output of selected stations and sold it to local undertakings which required electricity for distribution. Connections between undertakings enabled spare standby plant to be reduced, by 1938 the proportion of spare plant had fallen from 80 per cent to just 15 per cent. Generating cost fell by 24 per cent. The National Grid, operating at 132 kV, was constructed over the period 1927–1933. From 1938 the grid operated as a single integrated unit.

The Electricity Act 1947 (10 & 11 Geo. 6. c. 54) nationalised the UK electricity supply industry. The Central Electricity Board, the Electricity Commissioners, and the joint electricity authorities were abolished. The Ownership of electricity generation and transmission facilities were vested in the British Electricity Authority, and electricity distribution and sales in local electricity boards.

Section 33 of the act was repealed by section 1(1) of, and part IX of schedule 1 to, the Statute Law (Repeals) Act 1981, which came into force on 21 May 1981.

The 1926 act and most other electricity-related British legislation were repealed and replaced by the Electricity Act 1989.

== See also ==
- Electric Lighting Acts 1882 to 1909
- Electricity (Supply) Act 1919
- Electricity (Supply) Act 1922
- Electricity (Supply) Act 1935
- Electricity Act 1947
- Electricity Act 1957
- Electricity Act 1989
- Timeline of the UK electricity supply industry
