= Electricity (Supply) Act 1919 =

Act of the Parliament of the United Kingdom

Electricity (Supply) Act 1919 (Note: Section 40(1).)
- Act of Parliament
- Parliament of the United Kingdom
- Long title: An Act to amend the Law with respect to the supply of electricity.
- Citation: 9 & 10 Geo. 5. c. 100
- Territorial extent: United Kingdom

Dates
- Royal assent: 23 December 1919
- Commencement: 23 December 1919 (Note: The Acts of Parliament (Commencement) Act 1793.)
- Repealed: 31 March 1990 (Note: The Electricity Act 1989 (Commencement No. 2) Order 1990 (SI 1990/117).)
Other legislation
Amends	Electric Lighting Acts 1882 to 1909
Amended by	Electricity (Supply) Act 1922; Electricity (Supply) Act 1933; Electricity Act 1947; Railway and Canal Commission (Abolition) Act 1949; Water Resources Act 1963; Energy Act 1983
Repealed by	Electricity Act 1989

Status: Repealed

Text of statute as originally enacted

The Electricity (Supply) Act 1919 (9 & 10 Geo. 5. c. 100) was an act of the Parliament of the United Kingdom which amended the law with respect to the supply of electricity. It established the statutory body of the Electricity Commissioners ‘to promote, regulate and supervise the supply of electricity’ under the direction of the Board of Trade. It provided for the formation of electricity districts and, where necessary, the establishment of joint electricity authorities, ‘to provide or secure the provision of a cheap and abundant supply of electricity’.

== Background ==
In 1917, the UK government was planning the reconstruction of the nation's industries after the First World War. The Board of Trade set up the Electric Power Supply Committee, chaired by Sir Archibald Williamson, which proposed the effective nationalisation of the industry.

Subsequently, in 1919 under the chairmanship of Sir Henry Birchenough, the Advisory Council to the Ministry of Reconstruction produced the Report of the Committee of Chairmen on Electric Power Supply. The committee were asked to submit general comments or suggestions on the broad administrative and commercial issues which had arisen out of the Williamson Report. The Birchenough Committee generally agreed with the Williamson Report but recommended that generation and transmission should be a single unified system with state regulation and finance and that means should be found for including distribution as well. This recommendation was very far-sighted but considered too ambitious by the government. If acted upon it would have anticipated the Electricity Act 1947 by 28 years.

Parliament rejected what would have been the effective nationalisation of the industry but enacted two of the committee's recommendations in a weaker form, including the setting up of the Electricity Commissioners and a number of joint electricity authorities formed by the electricity suppliers in each area.

The Electricity (Supply) Act 1919, was based essentially on the Williamson and Birchenough reports and introduced central co-ordination by establishing the Electricity Commissioners, an official body responsible for securing reorganisation on a regional basis.

== The Electricity (Supply) Act 1919 ==
The Electricity (Supply) Act 1919 received royal assent on 23 December 1919. Its long title is: ’An Act to amend the Law with respect to the supply of electricity’.

=== Provisions ===
The provisions of the act were as follows.

Electricity Commissioners

To established a body called the Electricity Commissioners to promote, regulate and supervise the supply of electricity (section 1 (1)). The number of commissioners and their duties (section 1 (2–8). The Board of Trade to exercise its duties through the Commissioners (section 3). Commissioners to conduct experiments on electricity supply (section 3). Appointment of advisory committee (section 4).

Reorganisation of supply of electricity

Determination of electricity districts (section 5). Establishment of joint electricity authorities (section 6). Making orders to confirm schemes (section 7). Powers and duties of joint electricity authorities (section 8).

Generating stations

A joint electricity authority may own a generating station or main transmission line (section 9) and acquire land (section 10). Extensions and new stations require consent of the commissioners (section 11).

Powers of joint electricity authorities

Powers of joint electricity authorities (section 12). Transfer of undertakings to joint electricity authorities (section 13), power companies and joint electricity authorities (section 14), subsidiary powers such as abstraction of water, waste heat, by-product plant (section 15). Deprivation of employment (section 16), plans for capital expenditure (section 17).

Transitory provisions

Construction of interim works (section 18), mutual assistance between undertakings permitted (section 19).

Amendments of Electric Lighting Acts

Transfer of powers of the Ministry of Health, the Scottish Office and London County Council (section 20). Wayleaves (section 22), supply of apparatus (section 23), alteration of type of current (section 24). Amendment of 1882 Act (section 25), substitution of special for provisional orders (section 26), requirement for accounts (section 27).

Financial provisions

Revenue and expenditure of joint electricity authorities (section 28), expenses and appropriation of Electricity Commissioners (section 29), other expenses (section 30).

General

Agreements and arrangements (section 32). Holding inquiries (section 33), power to make rules (section 34). Special orders (section 35). Definitions (section 36). Application to Scotland and Ireland (sections 37 and 38). Transfer of powers of Board of Trade to Minister of Transport (section 39). Short title and construction (section 40).

Schedule relating to section 35.

== Joint electricity authorities ==
Four joint electricity authorities (JEA) were established after the Electricity (Supply) Act 1922 (12 & 13 Geo. 5. c. 46) had enabled then to borrow money to finance electricity schemes: North Wales & South Cheshire JEA, London and Home Counties JEA, West Midlands JEA and North West Midlands JEA.

== Subsequent developments ==
The Electricity (Supply) Act 1922 (12 & 13 Geo. 5. c. 46). Enabled joint electricity authorities to borrow money to finance electricity schemes.

The London Electricity (No. 1) Act 1925 (15 & 16 Geo. 5. c. lxii) and the London Electricity (No. 2) Act 1925 (15 & 16 Geo. 5. c. lxiii) permitted the London and Home Counties Joint Electricity Authority to purchase company electricity undertakings in the London area.

The Electricity (Supply) Act 1926 (16 & 17 Geo. 5. c. 51), established the Central Electricity Board.

The Electricity Act 1947 (10 & 11 Geo. 6. c. 54), nationalised the UK electricity supply industry. The Electricity Commissioners and the joint electricity authorities were abolished. The ownership of electricity generation and transmission facilities were vested in the British Electricity Authority, and electricity distribution and sales in local electricity boards.

The act and most other electricity-related British legislation were repealed and replaced by the Electricity Act 1989.

== See also ==
- Electric Lighting Acts 1882 to 1909
- Electricity (Supply) Act 1922
- Electricity (Supply) Act 1935
- Electricity Act 1947
- Electricity Act 1957
- Electricity Act 1989
- Timeline of the UK electricity supply industry
