= Electricity Act 1947 =

Act of the Parliament of the United Kingdom

Electricity Act 1947 (Note: Section 69(1).)
- Act of Parliament
- Parliament of the United Kingdom
- Long title: An Act to provide for the establishment of a British Electricity Authority and Area Electricity Boards and for the exercise and performance by that Authority and those Boards and the North of Scotland Hydro-Electric Board of functions relating to the supply of electricity and certain other matters; for the transfer to the said Authority or any such Board as aforesaid of property, rights, obligations and liabilities of electricity undertakers and other bodies; to amend the law relating to the supply of electricity; to make certain consequential provision as to income tax; and for purposes connected with the matters aforesaid.
- Citation: 10 & 11 Geo. 6. c. 54
- Territorial extent: England and Wales; Scotland; (Note: Section 69(2).)

Dates
- Royal assent: 13 August 1947
- Commencement: 13 August 1947 (Note: The Acts of Parliament (Commencement) Act 1793.)
Other legislation
Amends	Electric Lighting Act 1882; Electric Lighting Act 1888; Electric Lighting (Scotland) Act 1890; Electric Lighting (Clauses) Act 1899; Electric Lighting Act 1909; Electricity (Supply) Act 1919; Electricity (Supply) Act 1922; Electricity (Supply) Act 1926; Local Government Act 1933; Electricity Supply (Meters) Act 1936; Civil Defence Act 1939; Hydro-Electric Development (Scotland) Act 1943; Hydro-Electric Undertakings (Valuation for Rating) (Scotland) Act 1945
Repeals/revokes	Electric Lighting (Scotland) Act 1902; Statutory Gas Companies (Electricity Supply Powers) Act 1925; Electricity (Supply) Act 1928; Electricity (Supply) Act 1933; Electricity (Supply) Act 1935
Amended by	Law Reform (Limitation of Actions, etc.) Act 1954; Electricity Act 1957Charities Act 1960; Water Resources Act 1963; Electricity and Gas Act 1963; Statute Law Revision (Consequential Repeals) Act 1965; Statute Law (Repeals) Act 1971; Statute Law (Repeals) Act 1977; Statute Law (Repeals) Act 1978; Electricity (Scotland) Act 1979; Acquisition of Land Act 1981; Energy Act 1983; Statute Law (Repeals) Act 1986; Electricity Act 1989

Status: Partially repealed

Text of statute as originally enacted

Revised text of statute as amended

Text of the Electricity Act 1947 as in force today (including any amendments) within the United Kingdom, from legislation.gov.uk.

The Electricity Act 1947 (10 & 11 Geo. 6. c. 54) is an act of the Parliament of the United Kingdom which nationalised, or bought into state control, the electricity supply industry in Great Britain. It established a central authority called the British Electricity Authority (BEA) to own and operate all public electricity generation and transmission facilities and created 14 area electricity boards with a duty to acquire bulk supplies of electricity from the central authority and to distribute and sell electricity economically and efficiently to industrial, commercial and domestic consumers. It vested 505 separate local authority and company owned electricity undertakings in the BEA with effect from 1 April 1948. The Electricity Act 1947 is one of a number of acts promulgated by the post-war Labour government to nationalise elements of the UK's industrial infrastructure; other acts include the Coal Industry Nationalisation Act 1946 (9 & 10 Geo. 6. c. 59; Transport Act 1947 (10 & 11 Geo. 6. c. 49) (railways and long-distance road haulage); Gas Act 1948 (10 & 11 Geo. 6. c. 54); and Iron and Steel Act 1949 (12, 13 & 14 Geo. 6. c. 72).

== Background ==
The issues of fragmentation, inefficiency and complexity of the British electricity supply industry had long been recognised. The Electricity (Supply) Acts 1919 and 1926 had attempted to provide central coordination and control of operations, through the creation of the Electricity Commissioners and the Central Electricity Board respectively, but with only partial effectiveness. In 1935 the government appointed a committee to examine electricity distribution under the chairmanship of Sir Harry McGowan. The subsequent report recommended that new legislation should aim to give compulsory powers for larger and more efficient electricity undertakings to absorb smaller and less efficient ones. New schemes should be prepared with a view to public ownership of all undertakings. A start was made in 1937 by the Electricity Commissioners to prepare schemes for districts to be consolidated into groups. These plans were not implemented before the war.

The Labour leader of the London County Council, Herbert Morrison, made a speech in the House of Commons in 1936 proposing that the 600-odd electricity undertakings together with the Central Electricity Board and the Electricity Commissioners should be abolished and ownership of the industry should be vested in a National Electricity Corporation.

During the Second World War the Ministry of Fuel and Power was formed in June 1942 to coordinate and assume control (from the Board of Trade) of the production and supply of electricity, coal, gas and other fuels under war-time conditions. One of its first roles was to establish a Joint Committee of Electricity Supply Organisations to make recommendations on the future constitution, control and management of electricity supply. Several proposals were put forward:

- The London and Home Counties Joint Electricity Authority proposed that the 75 electricity undertakings within its area should be absorbed into a London Electricity Board.
- The Electrical Power Engineers Association proposed a public service National Electricity Supply Board to take over the roles of the Central Electricity Board, generating stations and distribution networks.
- The Incorporated Municipal Electrical Association recommended that power stations should be owned by the Central Electricity Board and that local authorities should be responsible for distribution of electricity.

A reconstruction sub-committee of the Coalition Government, chaired by the Minister of Fuel and Power reported in 1943 on the future of the supply industry. The committee noted that the split between ownership and control of generation had 'inevitably involved many complications, some financial and some practical'. The Central Electricity Board had limited control over the design of power station plant, and there were tensions between commercial expediency and the national interest. The committee recommended 'centralising in the hands of a single generating authority the ownership, and not merely the control, of the stations generating for public supply'. The recommendations formed the basis of the structure of the industry taken forward in the Electricity Act 1947.

Area electricity boards
1. North of Scotland Hydro-Electric Board (created 1943); 2. South West Scotland Electricity Board; 3. South East Scotland Electricity Board; 4. North Western Electricity Board; 5. North Eastern Electricity Board; 6. Yorkshire Electricity Board; 7. Merseyside and North Wales Electricity Board; 8. East Midlands Electricity Board; 9. South Wales Electricity Board; 10. Midlands Electricity Board; 11. Eastern Electricity Board; 12. South Western Electricity Board; 13. Southern Electricity Board; 14. London Electricity Board; 15. South Eastern Electricity Board

=== Electricity (Allocation of Undertakings to Area Boards) Order 1948 ===
Electricity (Allocation of Undertakings to Area Boards) Order 1948 (Note: Section 2.)
- Statutory Instrument
- Parliament of the United Kingdom
- Citation: SI 1948/484
- Territorial extent: United Kingdom

Dates
- Made: 10 March 1948
- Laid before Parliament: 11 March 1948
- Commencement: 31 March 1948
Other legislation
Made under	Electricity Act 1947

Status: Current legislation

Text of statute as originally enacted

The specific assignment and transfer of the existing electricity undertakings to the new area electricity boards was specified by the Electricity (Allocation of Undertakings to Area Boards) Order 1948 (SI 1948/484), coming into effect from 31 March 1948.

== Provisions ==
The provisions of the act comprise 69 sections in four parts, plus five schedules.

- Part I British Electricity Authority and area electricity boards
  - Sections 1 to 12 – including the constitution of the central authority and the electricity boards; functions of the electricity boards; powers of the minister, the central authority and electricity boards; consultative councils.
- Part II Acquisition of electricity undertakings
  - Vesting of Assets – Sections 13 to 19 – including bodies to whom Part II applies; undertakings of local authorities; composite companies; transfer of property
  - Compensation to Holders of Securities – Sections 20 and 21
  - Compensation to local authorities – Sections 22 to 24
  - Compensation to Composite Companies – Section 25
  - Control of Dividends and Interest and Safeguarding of Assets pending transfer – Sections 26 to 30 – including control of dividends and interest; income tax
  - Supplementary Provisions – Sections 31 to 35 – including Arbitration tribunal; enforcement
- Part III Financial provisions
  - Sections 36 to 47 – including duties ad powers of central authority and Area Boards; tariffs; borrowing powers; British Electricity Stock; Treasury guarantees; accounts and audits.
- Part IV Miscellaneous and general
  - Non-statutory undertakings – Section 48 – acquisition
  - Further provisions as to electricity supply – Sections 49 to 52 – railways; use of heat; certification of meters
  - Conditions of Employment and Pension Rights – Sections 53 to 56
  - Consequential amendment of Statutory Provisions – Sections 57 to 59 – amendment and repeal of enactments; power to dissolve Electricity Commissioners
  - General – Sections 60 to 69 – making regulations; penalties; notices; inquiries; application to Scotland
- Five schedules – including lists of undertakings; enactments amended and repealed.

== Subsequent developments ==
Subsequently, the South of Scotland Electricity Board (SSEB), was formed by the merger of the South West Scotland Electricity Board and South East Scotland Electricity Board under the provisions of the Electricity Reorganisation (Scotland) Act 1954. The functions of the Minister of Power in respect of electricity supply in Scotland were transferred to the Secretary of State for Scotland. The act also made provision for the title of the British Electricity Authority to be changed to the Central Electricity Authority. All these provisions of the 1954 act came into effect on 1 April 1955.

The Electricity Act 1957 (5 & 6 Eliz. 2. c. 48) dissolved the Central Electricity Authority and replaced it with two new statutory bodies, the Electricity Council and the Central Electricity Generating Board (CEGB).

The 1947 act and most other related British legislation were repealed and replaced by the Electricity Act 1989.

== See also ==
- List of pre-nationalisation UK electric power companies
- Electricity (Supply) Act 1919
- Electricity (Supply) Act 1922
- Electricity (Supply) Act 1926
- Electricity (Supply) Act 1935
- Electricity Act 1957
- Electricity Act 1989
- British Electricity Authority
- Utilities Act 2000
- Distribution network operator
- Northern Ireland Electricity
