= Electric Lighting Acts 1882 to 1909 =

United Kingdom legislation

The Electric Lighting Acts 1882 to 1909 are acts of the Parliament of the United Kingdom.

They comprise four public general acts:

- the Electric Lighting Act 1882 (45 & 46 Vict. c. 56);
- the Electric Lighting Act 1888 (51 & 52 Vict. c. 12);
- the Electric Lighting (Clauses) Act 1899 (62 & 63 Vict. c. 19); and
- the Electric Lighting Act 1909 (9 Edw. 7. c. 34).

The 1882 act was the first public measure to facilitate and regulate the early electricity industry in the UK. It enabled the Board of Trade to authorise the supply of electricity in any area by a local authority, company or person. Its provisions allowed suppliers to avoid the effort and expense of promoting private parliamentary bills to regularise their legal powers to supply electricity.

The 1888 act amended the 1882 act and extended the local authority reversion period from 21 to 42 years.

The Electric Lighting (Clauses) Act 1899 incorporated in one act the clauses and provisions contained in provisional orders made under the 1882 and 1888 acts. It laid down common principles to be incorporated in all provisional orders.

The Electric Lighting Act 1909 amended the earlier legislation to reflect the need to reorganise electricity supply to take into account technical developments in the generation and transmission of electricity. The Electric Lighting Acts were amended by subsequent legislation, such as the Electricity Act 1947 which nationalised the electricity supply industry. The Electric Lighting Acts 1882 to 1909 were repealed in their entirety by the Electricity Act 1989, which privatised the UK electricity supply industry.

== Background ==
Liverpool (Corporation) Electric Lighting Act 1879 (Note: Section 1.)
- Act of Parliament
- Parliament of the United Kingdom
- Long title: An Act to make further provision for the Lighting of the Borough of Liverpool, and to extend the powers of the Mayor, Aldermen, and Burgesses of the Borough in relation to the supply of Light by Electricity; and for other purposes.
- Citation: 42 & 43 Vict. c. ccxiii
- Territorial extent: United Kingdom

Dates
- Royal assent: 11 August 1879
- Commencement: 11 August 1879 (Note: The Acts of Parliament (Commencement) Act 1793.)
- Repealed
Other legislation
Repealed by	Liverpool Corporation Act 1921

Status: Repealed

Text of statute as originally enacted

From the 1870s electric lighting was increasingly used to illuminate public and private spaces. In 1878 there were 20 lighting installations in service in Britain. Installations included, for example, the Tay Bridge railway yard (1876–7); London’s West India Docks (1877); the Gaiety Theatre, London (1878); Bramall Lane football ground, Sheffield (1878); Victoria Embankment, London (1878); St. Enoch’s station, Glasgow (1878); and Blackpool Promenade (1879). In 1878 there were 34 private bills before Parliament seeking legal powers for local authorities and companies to supply electricity in various towns and to break-up streets to lay electricity cables. Liverpool Corporation promoted a local act to provide it with legal powers to light streets by electricity. This was enacted as the Liverpool (Corporation) Electric Lighting Act 1879 (42 & 43 Vict. c. ccxiii), this was the first electric lighting act in the UK.

Given the number of private electricity bills before Parliament, on 28 March 1878 Parliament appointed a committee under the chairmanship of Dr. Lyon Playfair, MP to examine the issues of legislation for electric lighting. The terms of reference were ‘to consider whether it is desirable to authorize Municipal Corporations or other local authorities to adopt schemes for Lighting by Electricity: and to consider how far, and under what conditions, if at all, Gas or other Public Companies should be authorised to supply Light by Electricity’.

The Playfair committee reported on 13 June 1878 and concluded that local authorities should be allowed to break-up streets to lay cables or to consent to private companies to do this. The committee also considered allowing local authorities to purchase the companies providing a supply in their area after a number of years. The recommendations formed the basis of the subsequent Electric Lighting Bill.

The legislation permitted the Board of Trade, by license or provisional order, to grant any local authority, company or person to supply electricity and to install a system of supply, including a provision for the breaking up of roads. The President of the Board of Trade, Joseph Chamberlain, was the minister responsible for the 1882 act. Chamberlain had been Mayor of Birmingham and had experienced difficulties with the monopoly control of the gas industry in the city. He believed that the electricity industry required public control in order to protect consumers. To further protect the public against the power of private monopoly the bill also provided for maximum prices. As originally drafted the bill provided for a reversion period to local authority ownership of 15 years, this was amended to 21 years by the House of Lords during the passage of the bill.

== Electric Lighting Act 1882 ==
Electric Lighting Act 1882
- Act of Parliament
- Parliament of the United Kingdom
- Long title: An Act to facilitate and regulate the supply of Electricity for Lighting and other purposes in Great Britain and Ireland.
- Citation: 45 & 46 Vict. c. 56
- Introduced by: Joseph Chamberlain, President of the Board of Trade (Commons)
- Territorial extent: United Kingdom

Dates
- Royal assent: 18 August 1882
- Commencement: 18 August 1882
- Repealed: 31 March 1990 (Note: The Electricity Act 1989 (Commencement No. 2) Order 1990 (SI 1990/117).)
Other legislation
Amended by	Electric Lighting Act 1888; Electric Lighting Act 1909; Larceny Act 1916; Electricity (Supply) Act 1919; Local Government Act 1933; Local Government (Scotland) Act 1947; Electricity Act 1947; Electricity Act 1957; Energy Act 1983
Repealed by	Electricity Act 1989

Status: Repealed

Text of statute as originally enacted

The Electric Lighting Act 1882 (45 & 46 Vict. c. 56) received royal assent on 18 August 1882. The long title of the act is ‘An Act to facilitate and regulate the supply of Electricity for Lighting and other purposes in Great Britain and Ireland'.

=== Provisions ===
As the first public general electricity act its provisions were wide-ranging, specifying the powers of the Board of Trade, local authorities and companies; the acquisition of land; construction of works; the running of cables; theft and damage; the protection of canals and mines; and financial matters.

The act comprised 37 sections, the provisions are summarised as follows.

- Section 2 of the act noted that the provisions of the act applied to any local authority, company or person; or any license or provisional order holder; or any special act; authorised to supply electricity within a specified area.
- Section 3 empowered the Board of Trade to issue licenses, valid for a renewable period of seven years, to supply electricity. The issue of licenses required the consent of local authorities. Licenses were allowed to include regulations and conditions.
- Section 4 empowered the Board of Trade to issue provisional orders to any local authority, company or person to supply electricity. These were made without the consents required for licenses and were for a limited or unlimited period. Local authorities had to be notified that orders were being made. The Board of Trade were permitted to submit to Parliament for the confirmation any provisional order. An order was not valid unless confirmed by an act of Parliament, if authorised these were entitled Electric Lighting Order(s) Confirmation Act. The terms of any provisional order could be amended by the enactment of a subsequent provisional order.
- Section 5 empowered the Board of Trade to amend the rules concerning the application for licenses and provisional orders.
- Section 6 required electricity undertakings to be subject to any regulations or conditions in their license, order, or special Act.
- Sections 7 and 8 permitted local authorities to defray any expenses out of local rates and to borrow money.
- Section 9 required electricity undertakings to keep and publish financial accounts.
- Section 10 permitted undertakings to acquire land, construct works, and obtain any machinery, apparatus, etc. necessary for the supply of electricity.
- Section 11 allowed local authority undertakings to contract to with any company or person for the construction and maintenance of any works needed for electricity supply.
- Section 12 incorporated the provisions of certain other acts into this act, these were the Land Clauses Acts, the Gasworks Clauses Act 1847, and the Gasworks Clauses Act 1871.
- Section 13 restricted undertakings from breaking up private streets, etc.
- Section 14 prohibited undertakings from running overhead cables, etc. without the consent of the local authority.
- Section 15 permitted undertakings to move pipes, cables, etc.
- Section 16 placed a duty on undertakings to ensure works near a canal did not restrict navigation.
- Section 17 required undertakings to minimise damage and provide compensation for any damage.
- Section 18 allowed consumers free choice in the selection of any type of lamp or burner.
- Section 19 obliged undertakings to supply electricity for private purposes.
- Section 20 required undertakings to charge for electricity at agreed prices.
- Section 21 permitted cutting-off of supply upon non-payment of charges.
- Section 22 made damage with intent to cut-off electricity supply a felony.
- Section 23 made stealing of electricity an offence of larceny.
- Section 24 gave undertakings the power to enter premises.
- Section 25 identified that electric lines, etc. shall not be the subject of distress to a property.
- Section 26 required undertakings not to alter telegraphy lines.
- Section 27 provided for a reversion period of an undertaking to local authority ownership of 21 years.
- Section 28 provided for disputed matters to be sent to arbitration.
- Section 29 gave the Board of Trade power to relieve gas undertakings of the obligation to supply gas if adequate electric lighting was provided.
- Section 30 required the Board of Trade to report to Parliament annually on the activities under this Act.
- Section 31 defines 'local authority' (also see Schedule).
- Section 32 defines and interprets some general expressions.
- Section 33 protected the operation of mines from the activities of undertakings.
- Section 34 specified that undertakings shall not be exempt from the provisions of this or any future general act.
- Section 35 required that this act shall not infringe the privileges of the Postmaster-General.
- Section 36 specified that this act shall apply to Scotland.
- Section 37 specified that this act shall apply to Ireland.

The schedule to the act defined local authorities and their borrowing conditions (see section 31 of the act).

=== Reversion period ===
It was seen at the time, and has been argued since, that the Section 27 buy-out provision after 21 years stifled private enterprise by deterring potential investors from committing their capital. However, the business historian Leslie Hannah has argued that 21 years would have been ‘an eternity to most investors’ and therefore was no disincentive to investment. For early undertakings it was rather a question of making electricity schemes financially viable by having sufficient customers and deploying the appropriate technology. The economists William Kennedy and Robert Delargy have argued that it was the inflated expectations of 1882 stock market boom in electricity stocks and the subsequent downturn that resulted in a lack of investment in the electricity industry throughout the 1880s. Nevertheless, the reversion period was extended to 42 years under the Electric Lighting Act 1888, which also valued a company’s assets as a going concern rather than the scrap value of the plant.

== Electric Lighting Act 1888 ==
Electric Lighting Act 1888 (Note: Section 5.)
- Act of Parliament
- Parliament of the United Kingdom
- Long title: An Act to amend the Electric Lighting Act, 1882.
- Citation: 51 & 52 Vict. c. 12
- Introduced by: Lord Thurlow (Lords)
- Territorial extent: United Kingdom

Dates
- Royal assent: 28 June 1888
- Commencement: 28 June 1888
- Repealed: 31 March 1990
Other legislation
Amends	Electric Lighting Act 1882
Amended by	Electricity Act 1947
Repealed by	Electricity Act 1989

Status: Repealed

Text of statute as originally enacted

The Electric Lighting Act 1888 (51 & 52 Vict. c. 12) received royal assent on 28 June 1888. The long title of the act is: 'An Act to amend the Electric Lighting Act, 1882'.

The act extended the reversion to local authority ownership to 42 years. It also required the consent of the local authority prior to the granting of provisional orders, whereas local authorities had only needed to be informed under the 1882 Act.

=== Provisions ===
The act comprised five sections, the provisions are summarised as follows.

- Section 1 provided that no provisional order shall be granted except with the consent of the local authority.
- Section 2 repealed Section 27 of the 1882 act and made provision for undertakings to sell their interests to the local authority after a period of 42 years, it also ensured the plant was valued as a ready for immediate working.
- Section 3 empowered the Board of Trade to vary the terms of sale in section 2.
- Section 4 placed restrictions on the placement of electric lines.
- Section 5 required that this act and the Electric Lighting Act 1882 shall be read and construed together as one act, to be cited as the Electric Lighting Acts 1882 and 1888.

== Local electricity legislation ==
Under the 1888 act the electricity supply industry began to grow significantly. The number of local electricity acts, orders and Electric Lighting Order Confirmation Acts made under the Electric Lighting Acts is given in the table.

Local electricity legislation
Year	Local acts	Electric Lighting Order Confirmation Acts	Orders granted	Licenses granted
1879	1	–	–	–
1880	1	–	–	–
1881	1	–	–	–
1882	0	–	–	–
1883	0	11	69	–
1884	0	4	4	1
1885	0	0	0	2
1886	0	1	1	1
1887	0	0	0	1
1888	0	0	0	5
1889	0	5	12	4
1890	0	14	74	4
1891	0	12	59	0
1892	0	6	25	2
1893	1	7	15	3
1894	0	5	24	3
1895	0	6	23	0
1896	0	7	31	3
1897	0	11	50	1
1898	1	8	65	0
1899	2	20	85	
1900	7	10	97	
1901	4	12	88	
1902	11	8	59	
1903	11	7	53	
1904	9	8	61	

For details of individual acts and locations see Timeline of the UK electricity supply industry. In addition to local acts and provisional orders, in the 10 years following the 1888 act 25 licenses were granted but only three were exercised.

In London there were competing applications for provisional orders. In 1888 the Board of Trade held an inquiry chaired by Major Sir Francis Arthur Marindin (1838–1900), a Board of Trade inspector. Marindin emphasised the importance of diversity and consumer choice. The inquiry report established the general principals which were adopted as the basis of provisional orders granted to undertakings in the London area. The report addressed several issues. Firstly, whether direct current (DC) or alternating current should be used for distribution; because electric motors at that time used DC this was favoured. Secondly, electricity supplies to a large area could be supplied by a single generating station. Thirdly, that electricity should be available to everyone despite local authority objections.

By 1914 the London County Council noted that the usual method of obtaining statutory powers to supply electricity within a defined area was by the grant of a provisional order made by the Board of Trade and confirmed by Parliament. Licenses were of secondary importance because of the limitation of the grant to a term of seven years and they required local authority consent. Parliamentary policy was to oppose special acts for powers obtainable by provisional order. Special acts were limited to cases where compulsory powers for the purchase of land were required because such provisions could not be included on provisional orders. Under the Electric Lighting Act 1909 the Board of Trade could authorise by provisional order the compulsory purchase of land to build power stations.

== Electric Lighting (Clauses) Act 1899 ==
Electric Lighting (Clauses) Act 1899 (Note: Section 2(1).)
- Act of Parliament
- Parliament of the United Kingdom
- Long title: An Act for incorporating in one Act certain provisions usually contained in Provisional Orders made under the Acts relating to Electric Lighting.
- Citation: 62 & 63 Vict. c. 19
- Territorial extent: United Kingdom (except the County of London) (Note: Section 2(2).)

Dates
- Royal assent: 9 August 1899
- Commencement: 1 October 1899 (Note: Section 2(3).)
- Repealed: 31 March 1990
Other legislation
Amended by	Electricity (Supply) Act 1926; Electricity Supply (Meters) Act 1936; Electricity Act 1947; Electricity Act 1957; Theft Act 1968; Energy Act 1983
Repealed by	Electricity Act 1989

Status: Repealed

Text of statute as originally enacted

The Electric Lighting (Clauses) Act 1899 (62 & 63 Vict. c. 19) received royal assent on 9 August 1899. The long title of this act is: 'An Act for incorporating in one Act certain provisions usually contained in Provisional Orders made under the Acts relating to Electric Lighting'.

The act comprised 84 sections and incorporated the usual clauses of provisional orders and special acts into a single act. It laid down common principles to be incorporated in all provisional orders except for those in London. It also prohibited amalgamation or association of electricity undertakings, or the supply of electricity outside the prescribed area.

== Electric Lighting Act 1909 ==
Electric Lighting Act 1909 (Note: Section 27(1).)
- Act of Parliament
- Parliament of the United Kingdom
- Long title: An Act to amend the Acts relating to Electric Lighting.
- Citation: 9 Edw. 7. c. 34
- Territorial extent: United Kingdom

Dates
- Royal assent: 25 November 1909
- Commencement: 1 April 1910 (Note: Section 27(3).)
- Repealed: 31 March 1990
Other legislation
Amends	Electric Lighting Act 1882
Amended by	Local Government Act 1933; Local Government (Scotland) Act 1947; Electricity Act 1947; Energy Act 1983
Repealed by	Electricity Act 1989

Status: Repealed

Text of statute as originally enacted

In 1903 the Board of Trade introduced into Parliament the Supply of Electricity Bill. This aimed to remove some of the restrictive features of the Electric Lighting Acts. However, the bill was not proceeded with as originally drafted. The 1909 act addressed these and other issues, recognising the need to reorganise the industry to account for technical developments in the generation and supply of electricity.

The Electric Lighting Act 1909 (9 Edw. 7. c. 34) received royal assent on 25 November 1909 and came into operation on 1 April 1910. Its long title is: 'An Act to amend the Acts relating to Electric Lighting'.

=== Provisions ===
The act comprises 27 sections. The key provisions were as follows.

- Section 1 gave the Board of Trade the power to authorise any electricity undertaking to compulsory purchase land to build a power station.
- Section 2 required undertakings to obtain the consent of the Board of Trade to construct a generating station.
- Section 4 allowed undertakings to supply electricity in bulk.
- Section 6 permitted a supply of electricity to premises outside an area of supply.
- Section 8 allowed undertakings to cooperate and to form joint committees.
- Section 23 prohibited unauthorised undertakings from competing with statutory undertakings.
- Section 11 of the 1909 Act amended clauses 49, 50, 51 and 53 in the Schedule to the 1899 Act

=== Nuisance ===
Under section 10 of the 1882 act an undertaking could construct a power station, however, there was little redress if the undertaking created a nuisance through noise, vibration, smoke, dust and flames. Section 2 of the 1909 act required consent from the Board of Trade and such authorisation required notice to be given to the local authority and to owners and occupiers of land within 300 yards (274 metres) of the site which provided the opportunity to object to the construction.

== Legislation titles and later acts ==
The 1909 act was the last act to use the phrase 'Electric Lighting' in the title. In the early days of the industry electricity was primarily used to provide electric lighting whether by arc light or incandescent bulb. By 1909 electricity was used for a wide range of uses other than lighting such as powering electric motors, traction current for trams, for domestic and industrial heating, for cooking and domestic uses such as ironing. Subsequent primary legislation after 1909 was entitled Electricity Supply Act (e.g. London Electric Supply Act 1910) or simply Electricity Act.

After 1909 subsequent Electricity Acts amended the Electric Lighting Acts 1882 to 1909.

The London Electric Supply Acts 1908 and 1910 permitted the London County Council to purchase company electricity undertakings in the London area from 26 August 1931.

The Electricity (Supply) Act 1919 (9 & 10 Geo. 5. c. 100) established the Electricity Commissioners. Section 26 of the act introduced a fourth means of obtaining statutory powers, the Special order. This was made by the Commissioners and confirmed by the Minister, or by an order establishing a joint electricity authority. Special orders required the approval of Parliament. Following enactment this act and the Electric Lighting Acts 1882 to 1909 were construed together as the Electricity (Supply) Acts 1882 to 1919.

The Electricity (Supply) Act 1922 (12 & 13 Geo. 5. c. 46). The schedule to this act amended some of the provisions of Section 32 (2) of the schedule to the Electric Lighting (Clauses) Act 1899.

The London Electricity (No. 1) Act 1925 (15 & 16 Geo. 5. c. lxii) and the London Electricity (No. 2) Act 1925 (15 & 16 Geo. 5. c. lxiii) permitted the London and Home Counties Joint Electricity Authority to purchase company electricity undertakings in London area in 1971.

The Electricity (Supply) Act 1926 (16 & 17 Geo. 5. c. 51), established the Central Electricity Board. The sixth schedule of the 1926 act made minor amendments to the 1882 act.

The Electricity Act 1947 (10 & 11 Geo. 6. c. 54), nationalised the UK electricity supply industry. The fifth schedule to the 1947 act repealed sections 2 to 11, 19, 20, 29, 30 and the schedule to the 1882 act; sections 1 to 3 of the 1888 act; sections 1 to 3, 5 to 9, 31 to 34, 37, 63 to 68, 70, 74, 75, 78 and 82 of the 1899 act. Ownership of electricity generation and transmission facilities were vested in the British Electricity Authority, and electricity distribution and sales in local electricity boards.

The Electricity Act 1989 (c. 29), privatised the UK electricity industry. Schedule 18 of the 1989 act repealed the whole of the following acts: the 1882 act; the 1888 act; the 1899 act; the 1909 act; the 1926 act; and the 1947 act.

== See also ==
- Electricity (Supply) Act 1919
- Electricity (Supply) Act 1922
- Electricity (Supply) Act 1935
- Electricity Act 1947
- Electricity Act 1957
- Electricity Act 1989
- Timeline of the UK electricity supply industry
