= Electricity (Supply) Act 1935 =

Act of the Parliament of the United Kingdom

Electricity (Supply) Act 1935 (Note: Section 5(1).)
- Act of Parliament
- Parliament of the United Kingdom
- Long title: An Act to authorise the Central Electricity Board to make certain arrangements with authorised undertakers who are the owners of, or control, generating stations which are not selected stations; to authorise the Central Electricity Board to supply electricity directly to railway companies for certain purposes; to amend sections eleven and twelve of the Electricity (Supply) Act, 1926; and for purposes connected with the matters aforesaid.
- Citation: 25 & 26 Geo. 5. c. 3
- Territorial extent: England and Wales; Scotland; (Note: Section 5(3).)

Dates
- Royal assent: 12 February 1935
- Commencement: 12 February 1935 (Note: The Acts of Parliament (Commencement) Act 1793.)
- Repealed: 1 April 1948 (Note: The Electricity (Vesting Date) Order 1948 (SI 1948/217).)
Other legislation
| Amends | Electricity (Supply) Act 1926 |
| Repealed by | Electricity Act 1947 |

Status: Repealed

Text of statute as originally enacted

The Electricity (Supply) Act 1935 (25 & 26 Geo. 5. c. 3) was an act of the Parliament of the United Kingdom which amended the law on the supply of electricity. The act was construed as one with the Electricity (Supply) Acts 1882 to 1933, and was cited as the Electricity (Supply) Acts 1882 to 1935. It authorised the Central Electricity Board to make arrangements with owners of generating stations that were not selected stations; it authorised the Central Electricity Board to supply electricity directly to railway companies; and amended sections 11 and 12 of the Electricity (Supply) Act 1926 (16 & 17 Geo. 5. c. 51).

== Background ==
The Central Electricity Board had been established by section 1 of the Electricity (Supply) Act 1926 (16 & 17 Geo. 5. c. 51). Its duties (section 2) included the identification of selected electricity generating stations, generally those that could produce electricity at the lowest cost. There were a number of marginal stations for which the price the Central Electricity Board was able to offer was still not below the working costs. Agreements were reached for these stations to take a supply from the board bringing the station under grid control. These agreements were ultra vires and were retrospectively sanctioned by section 1 of the 1935 Act.

Section 11 of the Electricity (Supply) Act 1919 (9 & 10 Geo. 5. c. 100) had prohibited railway companies from building generating stations unless they could demonstrate that electricity undertakers could not provide a supply at an equivalent or lesser cost. Railway companies had to negotiate with multiple undertakings along the route of their tracks. With the construction of the National Grid (1927–33) these arrangements had become wasteful and impracticable. Section 3 of the 1935 Act address this issue and permitted the Central Electricity Board to supply in bulk to railway companies.

The Central Electricity Board had, in some cases, offered long term concessions to undertakings to undercut private generation. These arrangements were retrospectively permitted by Section 2 of the 1935 Act.

== Provisions ==
The act comprised four sections as follows.

Section 1 (1) gave the Central Electricity Board the power to enter into agreements concerning operation with the owners or operators of generating stations that are not selected stations. Such agreements include regulating the manner in which the station is operated and maintained and including supplying electricity to the board and taking a supply from the board.

Section 1 (2) required the Electricity Commissioners to inquire into the working of past arrangements to which Section 1 (1) applies, to ensure that arrangements did not entail a financial loss to the Board.

Section 2 gave the Central Electricity Board the power to supply electricity to authorised undertakers at a price and a tariff specified by section 11 of the 1926 act.

Section 3 specified the price to be charged by authorised undertakers for electricity supplied to railway companies. It gave the Electricity Commissioners the power to specify the charges and allowances to be included in the price to be charged.

Section 4 gave the Central Electricity Board the power to supply electricity directly to railway companies.

Section 5 defines the short title, citation, interpretation and extent of the Act. The Act did not extend to Northern Ireland.

== Subsequent developments ==
The provisions of the Electricity (Supply) Acts 1882 to 1935 remained un-amended until the nationalisation of the industry under the Electricity Act 1947. (10 & 11 Geo. 6. c. 54).

The whole act was repealed by section 57(7) of, and the fifth schedule to, the Electricity Act 1947 (10 & 11 Geo. 6. c. 54), which came into force on 1 April 1948. The 1947 act nationalised the UK electricity supply industry. The Electricity Commissioners, the power companies, and the joint electricity authorities were abolished. The ownership of electricity generation and transmission facilities was vested in the British Electricity Authority.

== See also ==
- Electric Lighting Acts 1882 to 1909
- Electricity (Supply) Act 1919
- Electricity (Supply) Act 1926
- Electricity Act 1947
- Electricity Act 1957
- Electricity Act 1989
- Timeline of the UK electricity supply industry
