= Electricity (Scotland) Act 1979 =

Act of the Parliament of the United Kingdom

Electricity (Scotland) Act 1979 (Note: Section 47(1).)
- Act of Parliament
- Parliament of the United Kingdom
- Long title: An Act to consolidate certain enactments relating to the North of Scotland Hydro-Electric Board and the South of Scotland Electricity Board and to functions of the Secretary of State in relation to the generation and distribution of electricity in Scotland with amendments to give effect to recommendations of the Scottish Law Commission.
- Citation: 1979 c. 11
- Introduced by: The Lord Advocate (Mr. Ronald King Murray) (Commons)
- Territorial extent: Scotland; England and Wales (paragraph 1(b) of schedule 3); (Note: Section 47(2)–(3).)

Dates
- Royal assent: 22 March 1979
- Commencement: 22 April 1979 (Note: Section 47(4).)
- Repealed: 31 March 1990 (Note: The Electricity Act 1989 (Commencement No. 2) Order 1990 (SI 1990/117).); 9 November 2001 (Note: The Electricity Act 1989 (Commencement No. 3) Order 2001 (SI 2001/3419).)

Other legislation
- Amends: See § Repealed enactments
- Repeals/revokes: See § Repealed enactments
- Amended by: Overseas Development and Co-operation Act 1980; Energy Act 1983
- Repealed by: Electricity Act 1989

Status: Repealed

Text of statute as originally enacted

Revised text of statute as amended

The Electricity (Scotland) Act 1979 (c. 11) was an act of the Parliament of the United Kingdom which consolidated enactments relating to the Scottish electricity boards and removed certain anomalies.

== Background ==
The Scottish Law Commission had reviewed the operation of electricity supply industry in Scotland that had been established by the Electricity Act 1947 (10 & 11 Geo. 6. c. 54). The Commission noted a number of anomalies in the operation of the law with respect to electricity supply. There were five principal issues:

- Constitution and functions of electricity boards.
- Authorisation to supply electricity in another area or district where the agreement of the other board concerned cannot be obtained.
- Powers of entry on land.
- Directions as to the use and disposal of certain assets.
- Offences.

The Scottish Law Commission published a command paper Report on the consolidation of certain enactments relating to electricity in Scotland. Cmnd. 7178 dated May 1978.

The act enacted the recommendations of the Scottish Law Commission which were intended to remove anomalies in the law.

== Electricity (Scotland) Act 1979 ==
The Electricity (Scotland) Act 1979 received royal assent on 22 March 1979. Its long title is ‘An Act to consolidate certain enactments relating to the North of Scotland Hydro-Electric Board and the South of Scotland Electricity Board and to functions of the Secretary of State in relation to the generation and distribution of electricity in Scotland with amendments to give effect to recommendations of the Scottish Law Commission.’

=== Provisions ===
The act comprises 47 sections in three parts, plus 12 schedules:

Part I The Boards

Constitution

- Section 1. Constitution of Boards.
- Section 2. Definition and variation of districts.

Principal functions

- Section 3. Functions of the Boards.
- Section 4. General duties in exercising functions.
- Section 5. Duty in relation to amenity.
- Section б. Duty of North Board in relation to economic development.

Powers and duties

- Section 7. Ancillary powers.
- Section 8. Powers of Boards to enter into agreements with each other, and with other Boards and persons.
- Section 9. Purchase and supply of electricity.
- Section 10. Constructional schemes.
- Section 11. Acquisition of land etc. for purposes of constructional schemes.
- Section 12. Compulsory purchase of land.
- Section 13. Ancillary powers in relation to land.
- Section 14. Power to conduct experiments.
- Section 15. Research into heating from electricity.
- Section 16. Agreements for technical assistance overseas.

Consultation

- Section 17. Consultative Councils.

Finance

- Section 18. General Fund.
- Section 19. General reserve fund of the South Board.
- Section 20. Sums which are to be chargeable by the South Board to revenue account.
- Section 21. Application of surplus revenues of the South Board.
- Section 22. Fixing and variation of tariffs.
- Section 23. Maximum charges for reselling electricity supplied by the Boards.
- Section 24. Exchequer advances to the Boards.
- Section 25. Power to Treasury to guarantee loans to the Boards.
- Section 26. Power to issue stock.
- Section 27. Power of Boards to borrow.
- Section 28. Application of money.
- Section 29. Limit on aggregate of amount outstanding.
- Section 30. Accounts and audit.
- Section 31. Exemption from Taxes.

Part II Powers of the Secretary of State.

- Section 32. Powers of the Secretary of State.
- Section 33. Powers to give directions.
- Section 34. Transfer of orders.
- Section 35. Control of new private hydro-electric generating stations.
- Section 36. Compensation for members and officers of the Board.
- Section 37. Pension rights.
- Section 38. Inquiries.

Part III General and Miscellaneous

- Section 39. Disputes between Boards.
- Section 40. Orders and regulations.
- Section 41. Offences and penalties.
- Section 42. Annual Reports, statistics and returns.
- Section 43. Power of Boards to promote and oppose private legislation.
- Section 44. Service of notices etc.
- Section 45. Interpretation.
- Section 46. Transitional and saving provisions and consequential amendments and repeals.
- Section 47. Short title, extent and commencement.

=== Schedules ===
- Schedule 1. Constitution and proceedings of the Boards.
- Schedule 2. Districts.
- Schedule 3. Supply of electricity to railways.
- Schedule 4. Constitution and function of Amenity Committee and Fisheries Committee.
- Schedule 5. Constructional schemes.
- Schedule 6. Adaptions and modifications of Land Clauses Act and of the Railways Clauses Consolidation (Scotland) Act 1845.
- Schedule 7. Consultative Councils.
- Schedule 8. Provisions as to Inquiries.
- Schedule 9. Service of Notices.
- Schedule 10. Transitional and saving provisions.
- Schedule 11. Consequential amendment.
- Schedule 12. Repeals.

=== Repealed enactments ===
Section 46(2) of the act repealed 10 enactments, listed in schedule 12 to the act.

Enactments repealed by section 46(2)
Citation	Short title	Extent of repeal
6 & 7 Geo. 6. c. 32	Hydro-Electric Development (Scotland) Act 1943	The whole Act, except sections 2(1)(d), 16(1), 17, 27 in so far as it defines "maximum number of kilowatts" and other expressions, 28 and Schedule 4.
10 & 11 Geo. 6. c. 54	Electricity Act 1947	The whole Act except sections 1(3), 2(8A), 4(8), 13, 22, 54(5), 57(1) and (2), 60, 67, 68(1) to (3) and 69, Schedule 2 and Schedule 4 Parts I and III, and in so far as they relate to any matter affecting one of the Boards and the Generating Board or an Area Board, sections 1(4) and (5), 2(7), 4(2) to (7), 11(2) and 19.
2 & 3 Eliz. 2. c. 60	Electricity Reorganisation (Scotland) Act 1954	The whole Act, except sections 1(3), 10(2), 15(1), 16, 17 and, in Schedule 1, Part II.
5 & 6 Eliz. 2. c. 48	Electricity Act 1957	Sections 28 and 35. In section 29— in subsection (1), the words "or either of the Scottish Electricity Boards"; in subsection (3), the words "or District"; in subsection (4), the words "or Scottish Electricity Board". In schedule 4 Part II, the entries relating to section 2 and section 10A of the Act of 1943.
1963 c. 59	Electricity and Gas Act 1963	In section 2— in subsection (1), the words from "and the Secretary of State" to the words "South of Scotland Electricity Board"; and the words "or Board in question"; in subsections (3) and (6), the words "or the Secretary of State"; in subsections (4) and (7), the words "and the Secretary of State"; subsection (3). In section 3— in subsection (2), paragraphs (d) and (e); subsection (3). In section 4, subsection (3). In schedule 1, the entry relating to the Act of 1947; schedule 3.
1968 c. 39	Gas and Electricity Act 1968	The whole act.
1969 c. 1	Electricity (Scotland) Act 1969	The whole act.
1972 c. 17	Electricity Act 1972	The whole Act except sections 2 and 4.
1975 c. 55	Statutory Corporations (Financial Provisions) Act 1975	In schedule 2, the references to the North Board and the South Board. In schedule 3, Part I, except paragraph 5. In schedule 4, paragraphs 1 and 4.
1976 c. 61	Electricity (Financial Provisions) (Scotland) Act 1976	Section 1.

== Subsequent developments ==
The whole act was repealed by section 112(4) of, and schedule 18 to, the Electricity Act 1989, which came into force on 31 March 1990, with the exception of section 1 and parts of schedule 1 which came into force on 9 November 2001.

The 1989 act privatised the electricity supply industry. The provisions in section 1 and schedule 1 on the constitution of the electricity boards remained in force until 2001, when they were repealed by the Electricity Act 1989 (Commencement No. 3) Order 2001.

== See also ==
- Electricity Act 1947
- Electricity Act 1989
- Timeline of the UK electricity supply industry
