= Electricity Act 1989 =

Act of the Parliament of the United Kingdom

Electricity Act 1989 (Note: Section 113(1).)
- Act of Parliament
- Parliament of the United Kingdom
- Long title: Long title: An Act to provide for the appointment and functions of a Director General of Electricity Supply and of consumers' committees for the electricity supply industry; to make new provision with respect to the supply of electricity through electric lines and the generation and transmission of electricity for such supply; to abolish the Electricity Consumers' Council and the Consultative Councils established under the Electricity Act 1947; to provide for the vesting of the property, rights and liabilities of the Electricity Boards and the Electricity Council in companies nominated by the Secretary of State and the subsequent dissolution of those Boards and that Council; to provide for the giving of financial assistance in connection with the storage and reprocessing of nuclear fuel, the treatment, storage and disposal of radioactive waste and the decommissioning of nuclear installations; to amend the Rights of Entry (Gas and Electricity Boards) Act 1954 and the Local Government (Scotland) Act 1973; and for connected purposes.
- Citation: 1989 c. 29
- Territorial extent: England and Wales; Scotland; Northern Ireland (in part); (Note: Section 113(3).)

Dates
- Royal assent: 27 July 1989
- Commencement: 1 September 1989 (Note: Section 113(2).)

Other legislation
- Amends: Landlord and Tenant Act 1927; Electricity Act 1947; Rights of Entry (Gas and Electricity Boards) Act 1954; Science and Technology Act 1965; Nuclear Installations (Amendment) Act 1965; Nuclear Installations Act 1965; Forestry Act 1967; Fair Trading Act 1973; Local Government (Scotland) Act 1973; Restrictive Trade Practices Act 1976; Nuclear Safeguards and Electricity (Finance) Act 1978; Water (Scotland) Act 1980; Energy Act 1983; Airports Act 1986
- Repeals/revokes: Electric Lighting Act 1882; Electric Lighting Act 1888; Electric Lighting (Clauses) Act 1899; Electric Lighting Act 1909; Electricity (Supply) Act 1919; Electricity (Supply) Act 1922; Electricity (Supply) Act 1926; Electricity Supply (Meters) Act 1936; Hydro-Electric Development (Scotland) Act 1943; Electricity Act 1947; Civil Defence (Electricity Undertakings) Act 1954; Electricity Reorganisation (Scotland) Act 1954; Electricity Act 1957; Electricity (Amendment) Act 1961; Electricity and Gas Act 1963; Gas and Electricity Act 1968; Electricity Act 1972; Electricity (Financial Provisions) (Scotland) Act 1976; Electricity (Scotland) Act 1979; Electricity (Financial Provisions) (Scotland) Act 1988
- Amended by: Capital Allowances Act 1990; Planning (Consequential Provisions) Act 1990; Water Consolidation (Consequential Provisions) Act 1991; Coal Industry Act 1994; Gas Act 1995; Employment Tribunals Act 1996; Employment Rights Act 1996; Planning (Consequential Provisions) (Scotland) Act 1997; Postal Services Act 2000; Countryside and Rights of Way Act 2000; Statute Law (Repeals) Act 2004; Wireless Telegraphy Act 2006; Infrastructure Act 2015; Scotland Act 2016; Wales Act 2017; Digital Economy Act 2017; Energy Act 2023; Digital Markets, Competition and Consumers Act 2024; Planning and Infrastructure Act 2025
- Relates to: Water Act 1989

Status: Amended

Text of statute as originally enacted

Revised text of statute as amended

Text of the Electricity Act 1989 as in force today (including any amendments) within the United Kingdom, from legislation.gov.uk.

The Electricity Act 1989 (c. 29) is an act of the Parliament of the United Kingdom that provided for the privatisation of the electricity supply industry in Great Britain, by replacing the Central Electricity Generating Board in England and Wales and by restructuring the South of Scotland Electricity Board and the North of Scotland Hydro-Electric Board. The act also established a licensing regime and a regulator for the industry called the Office of Electricity Regulation (OFFER), which has since become the Office of Gas and Electricity Markets (OFGEM).

== Background ==
The liberalisation and privatisation of the energy markets in the United Kingdom began with the Margaret Thatcher government in the 1980s. This has been called the Thatcher-Lawson agenda, due to the key role of Nigel Lawson the Chancellor of the Exchequer (1983–89) in the Thatcher cabinet. The government recognised that the electricity industries in Europe and the United States operated successfully under private ownership. In contrast the Central Electricity Generating Board was seen as 'inflexible, bureaucratic, secretive and largely outside of political control'. Proposals for the privatisation of the electricity industry were published in 1988. Nuclear plant and 60 percent of conventional generation was to be vested in a large company codenamed 'Big G', the remaining conventional plant in 'Little G'. However, the government were unable to sell the nuclear plant. The CEGB was therefore split into four companies: PowerGen, National Power, Nuclear Electric and National Grid Company. The privatisation of the electricity supply industries was enacted by the Electricity Act 1989.

== Provisions ==
The act received royal assent on 27 July 1989. The long title of the act is ‘An Act to provide for the appointment and functions of a Director General of Electricity Supply and of consumers' committees for the electricity supply industry; to make new provision with respect to the supply of electricity through electric lines and the generation and transmission of electricity for such supply; to abolish the Electricity Consumers' Council and the Consultative Councils established under the Electricity Act 1947; to provide for the vesting of the property, rights and liabilities of the Electricity Boards and the Electricity Council in companies nominated by the Secretary of State and the subsequent dissolution of those Boards and that Council; to provide for the giving of financial assistance in connection with the storage and reprocessing of nuclear fuel, the treatment, storage and disposal of radioactive waste and the decommissioning of nuclear installations; to amend the Rights of Entry (Gas and Electricity Boards) Act 1954 and the Local Government (Scotland) Act 1973; and for connected purposes’.

The provisions of the act comprise 113 sections in three parts, plus 18 schedules.

Part I Electricity Supply

Introductory – Sections 1 to 3 – including the establishment of the Director General of Electricity Supply; Consumer's Committees; and general duties of the Secretary of State and the Director

Licensing of supply etc. – Sections 4 to 10 – including prohibition of unlicensed supply; licences authorising supply; conditions of licences; general duties and powers of licence holders

Modification of licenses – Sections 11 to 15 – modification by agreement; Monopolies Commission; reports; and by order

Supply by public electricity suppliers – Sections 16 to 24 – duty to supply; exceptions; power to recover charges, expenditure and to require security; terms of supply; agreements; disputes; electricity supply code

Enforcement of provisions – Sections 25 to 28 – orders; procedures; validity; power to require information

Provisions with respect to supply – Sections 29 to 31 – regulations; inspectors; meters

Protection of public interest – Sections 32 to 38 – non-fossil fuels; levy; fuel stocks; consent to construct; overhead lines; amenity and fisheries

Consumer protection – Sections 39 to 42 – performance; efficient use; information on performance

Consumer protection – Sections 43 to 44 – competition; maximum charges

Investigation of complaints – Sections 45 and 46 – enforcement and other matters

Other functions of Director – Sections 47 to 50 – general; publication of information; register; annual reports

Provisions with respect to Committees – Sections 51 to 53 – duties; reports; National Committee

Provisions with respect to Consumers’ etc. Councils – Sections 54 to 56 – Abolition; compensation; continuity of employment

Miscellaneous – Sections 57 to 59 – disclosure; restricting information; false statements

Supplemental – Sections 60 to 64 – power to make regulations; public inquiries; Crown land; interpretation

Part II Reorganisation of the industry

Transfers to successor companies – Sections 64 to 70

Ownership of successor companies – Sections 71 to 74

Finances of successor companies – Sections 75 to 81

Provisions with respect to flotation – Sections 82 and 83

Provisions with respect to existing bodies – Sections 84 and 88

Miscellaneous – Sections 89 to 92

Supplemental – Sections 93 to 95

Part III Miscellaneous and Supplemental

Miscellaneous – Sections 96 to 99

Amendment of enactments – Sections 100 to 103

Amendment etc. of pension schemes – Sections 104 and 105

Supplemental – Sections 106 to 113

Schedules

Schedules 1 to 18

== Effects ==
In England and Wales the electricity generating and transmission functions of the Central Electricity Generating Board were divided on 31 March 1990 into three new companies, namely: PowerGen, National Power and National Grid Company. Later, the nuclear facilities within National Power was separated and vested in another state-owned company called Nuclear Electric. The public were offered shares in 60 percent of both National Power and PowerGen in 1991, the remaining shares were offered to the public in 1995. These companies have subsequently been subject to acquisitions, mergers, de-mergers and rebranding.

From 31 March 1990 the regional electricity distribution and sales functions of twelve area electricity boards were vested in independent regional electricity companies (RECs). For example, the London Electricity Board was vested in London Electricity plc, and the North Western Electricity Board in Norweb plc. At first the RECs jointly owned the National Grid; they floated the National Grid Company on the stock market in late 1995. The RECs were floated on the stock market on 11 December 1990. Most of the companies have since been acquired by other utility companies.

The Electricity Council and its coordinating and policy-making functions were abolished by the 1989 Act. Although a residuary body, the Electricity Association, continued to operate for a few years. Section 1 of the 1989 Act established the Director General of Electricity Supply and the Office of Electricity Regulation (OFFER). This was an economic regulator independent of government, but accountable to Parliament. This arrangement separated the regulatory decisions from political control and aimed to provide greater long term regulatory certainty and to encourage market entry and investment.

Coordination of generation, transmission and distribution was achieved through the establishment of a wholesale pool operated by the National Grid Company. The electricity generators are paid the pool purchase price and users pay the pool selling price. The pool operator ranks the generators by their offer price and establishes a merit order according to the time of day and estimates of demand to set a market clearing price.

In Scotland, unlike in England and Wales, the electricity industry was already organised as an integrated generation, distribution, and supply structure. There were two electricity boards: the South of Scotland Electricity Board and the North of Scotland Hydro-electric Board. North of Scotland Electricity plc was formed on 1 April 1989 to acquire the assets the North of Scotland Board ahead of privatisation, the name was later changed to Scottish Hydro-Electric plc. The Board was dissolved in March 1990 and privatised in June 1991. Upon privatisation ScottishPower was created in 1990 largely from the South of Scotland Electricity Board. The nuclear power stations in Scotland (Hunterston A and B and Torness) were vested in Scottish Nuclear.

The 1989 act does not apply to Northern Ireland. Northern Ireland Electricity Networks Limited (NIE Networks) is the electricity asset owner of the transmission and distribution infrastructure in Northern Ireland, it was established in 1993 when the business was privatised.

The 1989 act repealed the Electric Lighting Acts dating from 1882, the Electricity (Supply) Acts 1919 and 1926, and the Electricity Acts 1947, 1957 and 1972.

== Later amending acts ==
Section 1 of the Utilities Act 2000 established the Office of Gas and Electricity Markets (OFGEM) which merged and abolished the Office of Electricity Regulation (OFFER) and Office of Gas Supply (OFGAS). The act also amended sections of Electricity Act 1989: these included those relating to electricity licensing; the duties of electricity distributors; the electricity code and metering; the powers of electricity licence holders; electricity performance standards; enforcement of obligations; remuneration and service standards; electricity from renewable sources; and some miscellaneous provisions.

The Energy Act 2004 established the Nuclear Decommissioning Authority and defined responsibilities for the decommissioning and cleaning up of civil nuclear installations and sites. Sections 3A, 29, 30, 43, 58, 64, and 98 of the 1989 Act were amended by Section 147 of the 2004 Act. Schedule 12 of the 1989 Act was amended by section 34 of the 2004 Act.

The Energy Act 2008 established a renewables obligation for generating electricity from renewable sources; made provisions for the decommissioning and clean-up of nuclear sites; and the provision of smart meters.

The Energy Act 2010 required the Government to prepare reports on the progress made on the decarbonisation of electricity generation in Britain and the development and use of Carbon Capture and Storage; and to create schemes for energy suppliers to give benefits to customers to reduce fuel poverty.

== See also ==
- Electricity Act 1947
- Electricity Act 1957
- Utilities Act 2000
- Privatization of the Central Electricity Generating Board
- Timeline of the UK electricity supply industry
- Energy policy of the United Kingdom
- Energy in the United Kingdom
- Energy law
