= Electricity Act 1957 =

Act of the Parliament of the United Kingdom

Electricity Act 1957 (Note: Section 43(1).)
- Act of Parliament
- Parliament of the United Kingdom
- Long title: An Act to provide for the dissolution of the Central Electricity Authority and the establishment of a Central Electricity Generating Board and an Electricity Council, and for the transfer of functions of the said Authority to that Board or Council or to the Minister of Power; to make further provision as to other matters relating to the supply of electricity; and for purposes connected with the matters aforesaid.
- Citation: 5 & 6 Eliz. 2. c. 48
- Territorial extent: England and Wales; Scotland (in part); (Note: Section 43(4)–(5).)

Dates
- Royal assent: 17 July 1957
- Commencement: various (Note: Section 43(3).)
- Repealed: 31 March 1990 (Note: The Electricity Act 1989 (Commencement No. 2) Order 1990 (SI 1990/117).)

Other legislation
- Amends: Electric Lighting Act 1882; Electric Lighting (Clauses) Act 1899; Electric Lighting Act 1909; Electricity (Supply) Act 1919; Hydro-Electric Development (Scotland) Act 1943; Electricity Act 1947; Local Government Act 1948; Gas and Electricity (Borrowing Powers) Act 1954; Electricity Reorganisation (Scotland) Act 1954; Finance Act 1956; Rating and Valuation Act 1957; House of Commons Disqualification Act 1957
- Amended by: Electricity and Gas Act 1963; General Rate Act 1967; National Loans Act 1968; Statute Law (Repeals) Act 1974; House of Commons Disqualification Act 1975; Statute Law (Repeals) Act 1977; Statute Law (Repeals) Act 1978; Electricity (Scotland) Act 1979; Energy Act 1983
- Repealed by: Electricity Act 1989

Status: Repealed

Text of statute as originally enacted

The Electricity Act 1957 (5 & 6 Eliz. 2. c. 48) was an act of the Parliament of the United Kingdom. The principal impact of the act was the dissolution of the Central Electricity Authority, which it replaced with the Central Electricity Generating Board (CEGB) and the Electricity Council.

The Electricity Act 1947 (10 & 11 Geo. 6. c. 54), which nationalised the industry, set up the British Electricity Authority (BEA) and 14 area boards; it also established a consultative council for each of the area boards. Two of the area boards served the south of Scotland. These were formed, together with the BEA's generation activities in the region, into the South of Scotland Electricity Board (SSEB) by the Electricity Reorganisation (Scotland) Act 1954, under which the BEA was renamed the Central Electricity Authority. The north of Scotland has been served since 1943 by the North of Scotland Hydro-Electric Board (NSHEB).

The principal innovation of the Electricity Act 1957 was the Electricity Council; however, this Act also turned the Central Electricity Authority into the Central Electricity Generating Board (CEGB).

The statutory bodies created by it had the following key responsibilities:

- The CEGB was required to develop and maintain an efficient, co-ordinated and economical system of supply of electricity in bulk to all parts of England and Wales. To this end it generated electricity and transmitted it, through the high voltage power lines and cables of its national grid, to Area Boards and direct to a few large industrial users;
- the 12 area boards in England and Wales (as created by the Electricity Act 1947) bought bulk supplies of electricity from the CEGB and distributed it to consumers in their area;
- the Electricity Council, the co-ordinating body of the electricity supply industry, advised the Secretary of State on matters affecting the industry, and promoted and assisted the development and maintenance by the CEGB and area boards of an efficient, co-ordinated and economical system of electricity supply;
- the 12 electricity consultative councils represented the interests of consumers in their area, and monitored the area boards' standards of service; and
- the Electricity Consumers' Council represented consumer interests at the national level, and could make representations concerning them to the ESI and to the Secretary of State. It had to be informed by the Electricity Council of the general plans and arrangements of both the Electricity Council and the CEGB, and, in particular, of any proposal by the CEGB to vary a tariff.

== Provisions ==
The Electricity Act 1957 comprised 43 Sections in six Parts, and five Schedules

Reorganisation

- 1. Dissolution of Central Electricity Authority
- 2. Establishment, constitution and functions of Central Electricity Generating Board.
- 3. Establishment, constitution and functions of Electricity Council.
- 4. Whole-time members.
- 5. Consultative Councils.

Generation of electricity by Area Boards, and provision for research

- 6. Generation of electricity.
- 7. Research.

Provisions as to administration, and as to conditions of employment

- 8. Powers of Minister.
- 9. Representations by Electricity Boards.
- 10. Annual reports.
- 11. Statements of accounts.
- 12. Terms and conditions of employment.

Finances of Electricity Boards and Electricity Council

- 13. Balance revenue account.
- 14. Tariffs and special agreements.
- 15. Borrowing powers.
- 16. Issue of stock.
- 17. Treasury guarantees.
- 18. Boards' requirements.
- 19. Central guarantee fund.
- 20. Reserve funds.
- 21. Contributions.
- 22. Surplus revenues.
- 23. Compensation to local authorities.
- 24. Income tax and profits tax.

Transfer of undertaking of Central Authority to Electricity Council and Generating Board

- 25. Transfer of assets of Central Authority.
- 26. Transfer of assets and liabilities.
- 27. Compensation.

Miscellaneous and supplementary provisions

- 28. Supply of electricity to railways.
- 29. Maximum charges.
- 30. Certification of meters.
- 31. Placing of service lines above ground.
- 32. Placing of electric lines.
- 33. Construction or extension of generating stations.
- 34. Public inquiries.
- 35. Entry on land.
- 36. Highway procedure in connection with electricity works.
- 37. Preservation of amenity.
- 38. Status of Electricity Council, Generating Board and Area Boards.
- 39. Administrative expenses.
- 40. Interpretation.
- 41. Transitional provisions.
- 42. Amendment and adaptation of enactments, and repeals.
- 43. Short title, citation, commencement and extent.

SCHEDULES:

- First Schedule - Councils.
- Second Schedule - Supplementary Provisions as to Public Inquiries.
- Third Schedule - Transitional Provisions.
- Fourth Schedule - Amendment and Adaptation of Enactments.
  - Part I - Amendments of Electricity Act, 1947.
  - Part II - Amendments and Adaptations of Other Enactments.
- Fifth Schedule - Enactments Repealed.

== Subsequent developments ==
Section 42(3) of, and schedule 5 to, the act, together with part of section 43(4), were repealed by section 1 of, and part XI of the schedule to, the Statute Law (Repeals) Act 1974, which came into force on 27 June 1974.

== See also ==
- Electricity Act 1947
- Electricity Act 1989
- British Electricity Authority
- Timeline of the UK electricity supply industry
- List of pre-nationalisation UK electric power companies
- Public electricity supplier
