= List of acts of the Parliament of the United Kingdom from 1883 =

This is a complete list of acts of the Parliament of the United Kingdom for the year 1883.

Note that the first parliament of the United Kingdom was held in 1801; parliaments between 1707 and 1800 were either parliaments of Great Britain or of Ireland). For acts passed up until 1707, see the list of acts of the Parliament of England and the list of acts of the Parliament of Scotland. For acts passed from 1707 to 1800, see the list of acts of the Parliament of Great Britain. See also the list of acts of the Parliament of Ireland.

For acts of the devolved parliaments and assemblies in the United Kingdom, see the list of acts of the Scottish Parliament, the list of acts of the Northern Ireland Assembly, and the list of acts and measures of Senedd Cymru; see also the list of acts of the Parliament of Northern Ireland.

The number shown after each act's title is its chapter number. Acts passed before 1963 are cited using this number, preceded by the year(s) of the reign during which the relevant parliamentary session was held; thus the Union with Ireland Act 1800 is cited as "39 & 40 Geo. 3 c. 67", meaning the 67th act passed during the session that started in the 39th year of the reign of George III and which finished in the 40th year of that reign. Note that the modern convention is to use Arabic numerals in citations (thus "41 Geo. 3" rather than "41 Geo. III"). Acts of the last session of the Parliament of Great Britain and the first session of the Parliament of the United Kingdom are both cited as "41 Geo. 3". Acts passed from 1963 onwards are simply cited by calendar year and chapter number.

All modern acts have a short title, e.g. the Local Government Act 2003. Some earlier acts also have a short title given to them by later acts, such as by the Short Titles Act 1896.

== 46 & 47 Vict. ==
The fourth session of the 22nd Parliament of the United Kingdom, which met from 15 February 1883 until 25 August 1883.

=== Public general acts ===
Short title	Citation	Royal assent
Long title
Consolidated Fund (Permanent Charges Redemption) Act 1883 (repealed)	46 & 47 Vict. c. 1	20 March 1883
An Act to amend the Consolidated Fund (Permanent Charges Redemption) Act, 1873. (Note: Consolidated Fund (Permanent Charges Redemption) Act 1873 (36 & 37 Vict. c. 57)) (Repealed by Statute Law (Repeals) Act 2004 (c. 14))
Consolidated Fund (No. 1) Act 1883 (repealed)	46 & 47 Vict. c. 2	20 March 1883
An Act to apply certain sums out of the Consolidated Fund to the service of the years ending on the thirty-first day of March one thousand eight hundred and eighty-two, one thousand eight hundred and eighty-three, and one thousand eight hundred and eighty-four. (Repealed by Statute Law Revision Act 1898 (61 & 62 Vict. c. 22))
Explosive Substances Act 1883	46 & 47 Vict. c. 3	10 April 1883
An Act to amend the Law relating to Explosive Substances.
National Gallery (Loan) Act 1883 (repealed)	46 & 47 Vict. c. 4	10 April 1883
An Act for enabling the Trustees and Director of the National Gallery to lend Works of Art to other Public Galleries in the United Kingdom. (Repealed by National Gallery and Tate Gallery Act 1954 (2 & 3 Eliz. 2. c. 65))
Consolidated Fund (No. 2) Act 1883 (repealed)	46 & 47 Vict. c. 5	10 April 1883
An Act to apply a sum out of the Consolidated Fund to the service of the year ending on the thirty-first day of March one thousand eight hundred and eighty-four. (Repealed by Statute Law Revision Act 1898 (61 & 62 Vict. c. 22))
Army (Annual) Act 1883 (repealed)	46 & 47 Vict. c. 6	26 April 1883
An Act to provide, during twelve months, for the Discipline and Regulation of the Army. (Repealed by Statute Law Revision Act 1898 (61 & 62 Vict. c. 22) and Revision of the Army and Air Force Acts (Transitional Provisions) Act 1955 (3 & 4 Eliz. 2. c. 20))
Bills of Sale (Ireland) Act (1879) Amendment Act 1883	46 & 47 Vict. c. 7	26 April 1883
An Act to amend the Bills of Sale (Ireland) Act, 1879. (Note: Bills of Sale (Ireland) Act 1879 (42 & 43 Vict. c. 50))
Glebe Loan (Ireland) Acts Amendment Act 1883 (repealed)	46 & 47 Vict. c. 8	31 May 1883
An Act to amend the Glebe Loans (Ireland) Acts. (Repealed by Glebe Loan (Ireland) Acts Amendment Act 1886 (49 & 50 Vict. c. 6), Statute Law Revision Act 1898 (61 & 62 Vict. c. 22) and Statute Law Revision Act (Northern Ireland) 1954 (c. 35 (N.I.)))
Isle of Man Harbours Act 1883 (repealed)	46 & 47 Vict. c. 9	31 May 1883
An Act to make further provision for taking dues for repairing and improving the Harbours in the Isle of Man. (Repealed by Harbours (Isle of Man) Act 1961 (An Act of Tynwald))
Customs and Inland Revenue Act 1883 (repealed)	46 & 47 Vict. c. 10	31 May 1883
An Act to grant certain Duties of Customs and Inland Revenue, to alter other Duties, and to amend the Laws relating to Customs and Inland Revenue. (Repealed for England and Wales by Regulatory Reform (Game) Order 2007 (SI 2007/2007) and for Scotland by Wildlife and Natural Environment (Scotland) Act 2011 (asp 6))
Poor Law Conferences Act 1883 (repealed)	46 & 47 Vict. c. 11	18 June 1883
An Act to provide for Expenses incurred by Guardians of the Poor in relation to Poor Law Conferences. (Repealed by Poor Law Act 1927 (17 & 18 Geo. 5. c. 14))
Prevention of Crime (Ireland) Act 1882 Amendment (Audience of Solicitors) Act 1883 (repealed)	46 & 47 Vict. c. 12	18 June 1883
An Act to amend the Act for the Prevention of Crime in Ireland, 1882, (Note: Prevention of Crime (Ireland) Act 1882 (45 & 46 Vict. c. 25)) as to the Audience of Solicitors. (Repealed by Statute Law Revision Act 1898 (61 & 62 Vict. c. 22))
Consolidated Fund (No. 3) Act 1883 (repealed)	46 & 47 Vict. c. 13	18 June 1883
An Act to apply the sum of five million nine hundred and seventy-three thousand nine hundred and twelve pounds out of the Consolidated Fund to the service of the year ending on the thirty-first day of March one thousand eight hundred and eighty-four. (Repealed by Statute Law Revision Act 1898 (61 & 62 Vict. c. 22))
Constabulary and Police (Ireland) Act 1883 (repealed)	46 & 47 Vict. c. 14	18 June 1883
An Act to amend the Laws relating to the Pay and Pensions of the Royal Irish Constabulary and the Police Force of Dublin Metropolis; and for other purposes. (Repealed by Police (Northern Ireland) Act 1998 (c. 32))
Lands Clauses (Umpire) Act 1883 (repealed)	46 & 47 Vict. c. 15	18 June 1883
An Act to amend the Lands Clauses Consolidation Act, 1845. (Note: Lands Clauses Consolidation Act 1845 (8 & 9 Vict. c. 18)) (Repealed by Compulsory Purchase Act 1965 (c. 56))
Lord Alcester's Grant Act 1883 (repealed)	46 & 47 Vict. c. 16	29 June 1883
An Act to grant a sum of money to Admiral Baron Alcester, G.C.B., in consideration of his eminent services. (Repealed by Statute Law Revision Act 1898 (61 & 62 Vict. c. 22))
Lord Wolseley's Grant Act 1883 (repealed)	46 & 47 Vict. c. 17	29 June 1883
An Act to grant a sum of money to General Baron Wolseley of Cairo, G.C.B., G.C.M.G., in consideration of his eminent services. (Repealed by Statute Law Revision Act 1898 (61 & 62 Vict. c. 22))
Municipal Corporations Act 1883	46 & 47 Vict. c. 18	29 June 1883
An Act to make provision respecting certain Municipal Corporations and other Local Authorities not subject to the Municipal Corporation Act.
Medical Act (1858) Amendment Act 1883 (repealed)	46 & 47 Vict. c. 19	16 July 1883
An Act to amend the Medical Act (1858). (Note: Medical Act 1858 (21 & 22 Vict. c. 90)) (Repealed by Medical Act 1886 (49 & 50 Vict. c. 48))
Registry of Deeds Office (Ireland) Holidays Act 1883 (repealed)	46 & 47 Vict. c. 20	16 July 1883
An Act to amend the Law relating to the Registry of Deeds Office, Ireland. (Repealed by Administrative and Financial Provisions Act (Northern Ireland) 1958 (c. 20 (N.I.)))
Annual Turnpike Acts Continuance Act 1883 (repealed)	46 & 47 Vict. c. 21	2 August 1883
An Act to continue certain Turnpike Acts, and to repeal certain other Turnpike Acts; and for other purposes connected therewith. (Repealed by Statute Law Revision Act 1898 (61 & 62 Vict. c. 22))
Sea Fisheries Act 1883 (repealed)	46 & 47 Vict. c. 22	2 August 1883
An Act to carry into effect, an International Convention concerning the Fisheries in the North Sea, and to amend the laws relating to British Sea Fisheries. (Repealed by Statute Law (Repeals) Act 1998 (c. 43))
Consolidated Fund (No. 4) Act 1883 (repealed)	46 & 47 Vict. c. 23	2 August 1883
An Act to apply the sum of fifteen million one hundred and eighty-two thousand seven hundred and seven pounds out of the Consolidated Fund to the service of the year ending on the thirty-first day of March one thousand eight hundred and eighty-four. (Repealed by Statute Law Revision Act 1898 (61 & 62 Vict. c. 22))
Relief of Distressed Unions (Ireland) Act 1883 (repealed)	46 & 47 Vict. c. 24	2 August 1883
An Act to make temporary provision for the Relief of the destitute Poor in Ireland. (Repealed by Statute Law Revision Act 1898 (61 & 62 Vict. c. 22) and Statute Law Revision Act (Northern Ireland) 1954 (c. 35 (N.I.)))
Prison Service (Ireland) Act 1883 (repealed)	46 & 47 Vict. c. 25	2 August 1883
An Act to explain and amend the thirty-second section of the General Prisons (Ireland) Act, 1877. (Note: General Prisons (Ireland) Act 1877 (40 & 41 Vict. c. 49)) (Repealed by Statute Law Revision Act (Northern Ireland) 1954 (c. 35 (N.I.)))
Sea Fisheries (Ireland) Act 1883 (repealed)	46 & 47 Vict. c. 26	2 August 1883
An Act to promote the Sea Fisheries of Ireland. (Repealed by Public Works Loans Act 1889 (52 & 53 Vict. c. 71), Statute Law Revision Act 1898 (61 & 62 Vict. c. 22) and Public Works, etc., Loans Act (Northern Ireland) 1953 (c. 13 (N.I.)))
Metropolitan Board of Works (Money) Act 1883 (repealed)	46 & 47 Vict. c. 27	20 August 1883
An Act further to amend the Acts relating to the raising of Money by the Metropolitan Board of Works; and for other purposes. (Repealed by London County Council (Finance Consolidation) Act 1912 (2 & 3 Geo. 5. c. cv))
Companies Act 1883 (repealed)	46 & 47 Vict. c. 28	20 August 1883
An Act to amend the Companies Acts, 1862 (Note: Companies Act 1862 (25 & 26 Vict. c. 89)) and 1867. (Note: Companies Act 1867 (30 & 31 Vict. c. 131)) (Repealed by Preferential Payments in Bankruptcy Act 1888 (51 & 52 Vict. c. 62) and Preferential Payments in Bankruptcy (Ireland) Act 1889 (52 & 53 Vict. c. 60))
Supreme Court of Judicature (Funds, &c.) Act 1883 (repealed)	46 & 47 Vict. c. 29	20 August 1883
An Act to consolidate the Accounting Departments of the Supreme Court of Judicature, and for other purposes. (Repealed by Supreme Court of Judicature (Consolidation) Act 1925 (15 & 16 Geo. 5. c. 49))
Companies (Colonial Registers) Act 1883 (repealed)	46 & 47 Vict. c. 30	20 August 1883
An Act to authorise Companies registered under the Companies Act, 1862, to keep Local Registers of their Members in British Colonies. (Repealed by Companies (Consolidation) Act 1908 (8 Edw. 7. c. 69))
Payment of Wages in Public-houses Prohibition Act 1883 (repealed)	46 & 47 Vict. c. 31	20 August 1883
An Act to prohibit the Payment of Wages to Workmen in Public-houses and certain other places. (Repealed by Wages Act 1986 (c. 48))
Greenwich Hospital Act 1883	46 & 47 Vict. c. 32	20 August 1883
An Act to make further provision respecting the application of the Revenues of Greenwich Hospital, and for other purposes.
Irish Reproductive Loan Fund Amendment Act 1883	46 & 47 Vict. c. 33	20 August 1883
An Act to amend the Irish Reproductive Loan Fund Act, 1874. (Note: Irish Reproductive Loan Fund Act 1874 (37 & 38 Vict. c. 86))
Cheap Trains Act 1883 (repealed)	46 & 47 Vict. c. 34	20 August 1883
An Act to amend the Law relating to Railway Passenger Duty, and to amend and consolidate the Law relating to the conveyance of the Queen's Forces by Railway. (Repealed by Statute Law (Repeals) Act 1978 (c. 45))
Diseases Prevention (Metropolis) Act 1883 (repealed)	46 & 47 Vict. c. 35	20 August 1883
An Act to make better provision as regards the Metropolis for the isolation and treatment of persons suffering from Cholera and other Infectious Diseases; and for other purposes. (Repealed by Public Health (London) Act 1891 (54 & 55 Vict. c. 76))
City of London Parochial Charities Act 1883 (repealed)	46 & 47 Vict. c. 36	20 August 1883
An Act to provide for the better application and management of the Parochial Charities of the City of London. (Repealed by Statute Law Revision Act 1898 (61 & 62 Vict. c. 22))
Public Health Act 1875 (Support of Sewers) Amendment Act 1883 (repealed)	46 & 47 Vict. c. 37	25 August 1883
An Act to amend the Public Health Act, 1875, (Note: Public Health Act 1875 (38 & 39 Vict. c. 55)) and to make provision with respect to the support of public sewers and sewage works in mining districts. (Repealed by Statute Law (Repeals) Act 1998 (c. 43))
Trial of Lunatics Act 1883	46 & 47 Vict. c. 38	25 August 1883
An Act to amend the Law respecting the Trial and Custody of Insane Persons charged with offences. (Repealed for Northern Ireland by Criminal Lunatics Act 1884 (47 & 48 Vict. c. 64), Statute Law Revision Act 1898 (61 & 62 Vict. c. 22) and Mental Health Act (Northern Ireland) 1961 (c. 15 (N.I.)))
Statute Law Revision Act 1883	46 & 47 Vict. c. 39	25 August 1883
An Act for further promoting the Revision of the Statute Law by repealing certain Enactments which have ceased to be in force or have become unnecessary.
Expiring Laws Continuance Act 1883 (repealed)	46 & 47 Vict. c. 40	25 August 1883
An Act to continue various expiring Laws. (Repealed by Statute Law Revision Act 1898 (61 & 62 Vict. c. 22))
Merchant Shipping (Fishing Boats) Act 1883 (repealed)	46 & 47 Vict. c. 41	25 August 1883
An Act to amend the Merchant Shipping Acts, 1854 to 1880, with respect to fishing vessels and apprenticeship to the sea fishing service and otherwise. (Repealed by Merchant Shipping Act 1894 (57 & 58 Vict. c. 60))
Public Works Loans Act 1883 (repealed)	46 & 47 Vict. c. 42	25 August 1883
An Act to grant Money for the purpose of Loans by the Public Works Loan Commissioners and the Commissioners of Public Works in Ireland and the Irish Land Commission; and to amend the Acts relating to the said Commissioners, and for other purposes. (Repealed by Statute Law Revision Act 1898 (61 & 62 Vict. c. 22), Public Works, etc., Loans Act (Northern Ireland) 1953 (c. 13 (N.I.)) and Statute Law Revision Act (Northern Ireland) 1954 (c. 35 (N.I.)))
Tramways and Public Companies (Ireland) Act 1883	46 & 47 Vict. c. 43	25 August 1883
An Act for promoting the extension of Tramway communication in Ireland, and for assisting Emigration, and for extending certain provisions of the Land Law (Ireland) Act, 1881, (Note: Land Law (Ireland) Act 1881 (44 & 45 Vict. c. 49)) to the case of Public Companies.
Borough Constables Act 1883 (repealed)	46 & 47 Vict. c. 44	25 August 1883
An Act to explain the effect of Section One hundred and ninety five of the Municipal Corporations Act, 1882. (Note: Municipal Corporations Act 1882 (45 & 46 Vict. c.50)) (Repealed by Police Act 1964 (c. 48))
Counterfeit Medal Act 1883 (repealed)	46 & 47 Vict. c. 45	25 August 1883
An Act for preventing the Sale of Medals resembling Current Coin. (Repealed by Coinage Offences Act 1936 (26 Geo. 5 & 1 Edw. 8. c. 16))
Corrupt Practices (Suspension of Elections) Act 1883 (repealed)	46 & 47 Vict. c. 46	25 August 1883
An Act to suspend for a limited period, on account of Corrupt Practices, the holding of an Election of a Member or Members to serve in Parliament for certain cities and boroughs. (Repealed by Statute Law Revision Act 1898 (61 & 62 Vict. c. 22))
Provident Nominations and Small Intestacies Act 1883 (repealed)	46 & 47 Vict. c. 47	25 August 1883
An Act to extend the power of Nomination in Friendly and Industrial, &c., Societies, and to make further provision for cases of Intestacy in respect of Personal Property of small amount. (Repealed by Industrial Relations Act 1971 (c. 72))
Cholera Hospitals (Ireland) Act 1883 (repealed)	46 & 47 Vict. c. 48	25 August 1883
An Act to enable sanitary authorities in Ireland to take possession of land for the erection of temporary Cholera Hospitals. (Repealed by Statute Law Revision Act 1898 (61 & 62 Vict. c. 22))
Statute Law Revision and Civil Procedure Act 1883 (repealed)	46 & 47 Vict. c. 49	25 August 1883
An Act for promoting the Revision of the Statute Law by repealing various Enactments relating to Civil Procedure or matters connected therewith, and for amending in some respects the Law relating to Civil Procedure. (Repealed by Supreme Court of Judicature (Consolidation) Act 1925 (15 & 16 Geo. 5. c. 49))
Appropriation Act 1883 (repealed)	46 & 47 Vict. c. 50	25 August 1883
An Act to apply a sum out of the Consolidated Fund to the service of the year ending on the thirty-first day of March one thousand eight hundred and eighty-four, and to appropriate the Supplies granted in this Session of Parliament. (Repealed by Statute Law Revision Act 1898 (61 & 62 Vict. c. 22))
Corrupt and Illegal Practices Prevention Act 1883 or the Corrupt Practices Act 1883 (repealed)	46 & 47 Vict. c. 51	25 August 1883
An Act for the better prevention of Corrupt and Illegal Practices at Parliamentary Elections. (Repealed by Representation of the People Act 1949 (12, 13 & 14 Geo. 6. c. 68) and Election Commissioners Act 1949 (12, 13 & 14 Geo. 6. c. 90), for England and Wales by Senior Courts Act 1981 (c. 54), for Northern Ireland by Electoral Law (Northern Ireland) Act 1962 (c. 14 (N.I.)) and Statute Law Revision (Northern Ireland) Act 1976 (c. 12) and for Scotland by Court of Session Act 1988 (c. 36))
Bankruptcy Act 1883 (repealed)	46 & 47 Vict. c. 52	25 August 1883
An Act to amend and consolidate the Law of Bankruptcy. (Repealed by Statute Law (Repeals) Act 1989 (c. 43))
Factory and Workshop Act 1883 (repealed)	46 & 47 Vict. c. 53	25 August 1883
An Act to amend the Law relating to certain Factories and Workshops. (Repealed by Factory and Workshop Act 1901 (1 Edw. 7. c. 22))
National Debt Act 1883 (repealed)	46 & 47 Vict. c. 54	25 August 1883
An Act to make further provision respecting the National Debt, and the Investment of Moneys in the hands of the National Debt Commissioners on account of Savings Banks, and otherwise. (Repealed by National Debt and Local Loans Act 1887 (50 & 51 Vict. c. 16), Finance Act 1942 (5 & 6 Geo. 6. c. 21) and Statute Law Revision Act 1950 (14 Geo. 6. c. 6))
Revenue Act 1883 (repealed)	46 & 47 Vict. c. 55	25 August 1883
An Act to amend the law relating to the Customs and Inland Revenue, and to make other provisions respecting charges payable out of the public revenue, and for other purposes. (Repealed by Statute Law (Repeals) Act 2004 (c. 14))
Education (Scotland) Act 1883 (repealed)	46 & 47 Vict. c. 56	25 August 1883
An Act to amend the Laws relating to Education in Scotland, and for other purposes connected therewith. (Repealed by Day Industrial Schools (Scotland) Act 1893 (56 & 57 Vict. c. 12), Statute Law Revision Act 1898 (61 & 62 Vict. c. 22), Education (Scotland) Act 1901 (1 Edw. 7. c. 9), Education (Scotland) Act 1908 (8 Edw. 7. c. 63), Education (Scotland) Act 1918 (8 & 9 Geo. 5. c. 48) and Education (Scotland) Act 1945 (8 & 9 Geo. 6. c. 37))
Patents, Designs, and Trade Marks Act 1883 (repealed)	46 & 47 Vict. c. 57	25 August 1883
An Act to amend and consolidate the Law relating to Patents for Inventions, Registration of Designs, and of Trade Marks. (Repealed by Patents and Designs Act 1907 (7 Edw. 7. c. 29))
Post Office (Money Orders) Act 1883 (repealed)	46 & 47 Vict. c. 58	25 August 1883
An Act to amend the Post Office (Money Orders) Acts, 1848 (Note: Post Office (Money Orders) Act 1848 (11 & 12 Vict. c. 88)) and 1880, (Note: Post Office (Money Orders) Act 1880 (43 & 44 Vict. c. 33)) and extend the same to Her Majesty's Dominions out of the United Kingdom. (Repealed by Post Office Act 1908 (8 Edw. 7. c. 48))
Epidemic and other Diseases Prevention Act 1883 (repealed)	46 & 47 Vict. c. 59	25 August 1883
An Act to make better provision for the Prevention of outbreaks of formidable epidemic, endemic, or infectious diseases, and to amend the Public Health Act, England, 1875, and the Public Health Act, Ireland, 1878. (Note: Public Health (Ireland) Act 1878 (41 & 42 Vict. c. 52)) (Repealed for England and Wales by Public Health Act 1936 (26 Geo. 5 & 1 Edw. 8. c. 49) and for Northern Ireland by Local Government (Ireland) Act 1898 (61 & 62 Vict. c. 37) and Statute Law Revision Act (Northern Ireland) 1954 (c. 35 (N.I.)))
Labourers (Ireland) Act 1883 (repealed)	46 & 47 Vict. c. 60	25 August 1883
An Act to better the condition of Labourers in Ireland. (Repealed by Statute Law Revision Act (Northern Ireland) 1954 (c. 35 (N.I.)))
Agricultural Holdings (England) Act 1883 or the Agricultural Holdings Act 1883 (repealed)	46 & 47 Vict. c. 61	25 August 1883
An Act for amending the Law relating to Agricultural Holdings in England. (Repealed by Agricultural Holdings Act 1908 (8 Edw. 7. c. 28))
Agricultural Holdings (Scotland) Act 1883 (repealed)	46 & 47 Vict. c. 62	25 August 1883
An Act for amending the Law relating to Agricultural Holdings in Scotland. (Repealed by Agricultural Holdings (Scotland) Act 1908 (8 Edw. 7. c. 64))

=== Local acts ===
Short title	Citation	Royal assent
Long title
Chetham's Patent Act 1883	46 & 47 Vict. c. i	26 April 1883
An Act for rendering valid certain Letters Patent granted to William Chetham for "Improvements in Self-acting Temples for Looms."
Land Drainage Supplemental Act 1883 (repealed)	46 & 47 Vict. c. ii	26 April 1883
An Act to confirm a Provisional Order under the Land Drainage Act, 1861, (Note: Land Drainage Act 1861 (24 & 25 Vict. c. 133)) relating to Burgh Saint Peter Improvements, situate in the parish of Burgh Saint Peter, in the county of Norfolk. (Repealed by Statute Law (Repeals) Act 1993 (c. 50))
Rhins of Galloway Railway (Abandonment) Act 1883 (repealed)	46 & 47 Vict. c. iii	26 April 1883
An Act for the abandonment of the Rhins of Galloway Railway. (Repealed by Statute Law (Repeals) Act 2013 (c. 2))
British American Land Company's Act 1883	46 & 47 Vict. c. iv	26 April 1883
An Act for granting further Powers to the British American Land Company.
Mulling's Patent Act 1883	46 & 47 Vict. c. v	26 April 1883
An Act for reviving and rendering valid certain Letters Patent granted to Thomas John Mullings for a new and improved process for extracting Oil and Fat and oily and fatty matters from Wool and other substances and the apparatus connected therewith and applicable thereto.
Preston Park Act 1883 (repealed)	46 & 47 Vict. c. vi	31 May 1883
An Act to authorise the carrying into effect of an arrangement for the sale to and purchase by the Mayor Aldermen and Burgesses of Brighton for the purpose of a Public Park of certain Lands part of the Estates in the County of Sussex devised by the Will of William Stanford Esquire and for other purposes. (Repealed by Brighton Corporation Act 1931 (21 & 22 Geo. 5. c. cix))
Swindon and Cheltenham Extension Railway Act 1883	46 & 47 Vict. c. vii	31 May 1883
An Act to confer further Powers on the Swindon and Cheltenham Extension Railway Company; and for other purposes.
Aberdeen County and Burgh Roads Act 1883	46 & 47 Vict. c. viii	31 May 1883
An Act to continue and amend the Aberdeenshire Roads Act, 1865; (Note: Aberdeenshire Roads Act 1865 (28 & 29 Vict. c. ccxl)) and for other purposes.
British Fisheries Society Act 1883	46 & 47 Vict. c. ix	31 May 1883
An Act to provide for the dissolution of the British Fisheries Society; and for other purposes.
Oyster and Mussel Fisheries Orders Confirmation Act 1883	46 & 47 Vict. c. x	31 May 1883
An Act to confirm certain Orders made by the Board of Trade under the Sea Fisheries Act, 1868, (Note: Sea Fisheries Act 1868 (31 & 32 Vict. c. 45)) relating to Hamford Water, Hunstanton (le Strange), and Swansea.
	Hamford Water Fishery Order 1883	
	Le Strange Fishery Order 1883	
	Swansea Fishery Order 1883	
St. Saviour's Southwark (Church Rate Abolition) Act 1883	46 & 47 Vict. c. xi	31 May 1883
An Act for abolishing the Church Rate now leviable in the Parish of Saint Saviour, Southwark; for vesting in the Lord Bishop of the diocese the right of presentation to the Chaplaincy of the Parish Church, and for other purposes.
Price's Patent Candle Company Act 1883	46 & 47 Vict. c. xii	31 May 1883
An Act for reducing the Capital of Price’s Patent Candle Company (Limited), and for other purposes.
South Eastern Railway Act 1883	46 & 47 Vict. c. xiii	31 May 1883
An Act to confer further powers on the South-eastern Railway Company and for other purposes.
Caledonian and Callander and Oban Railways Act 1883	46 & 47 Vict. c. xiv	31 May 1883
An Act for enabling the Caledonian Railway Company to make certain Railways in the Counties of Stirling and Midlothian; and to abandon a certain authorised Railway in the County of Lanark; for extending the time of construction of certain of their authorised Railways in Lanarkshire; for releasing the remainder of a sum deposited by the Callander and Oban Railway Company; and for other purposes.
Telegraph Construction and Maintenance Company Act 1883	46 & 47 Vict. c. xv	31 May 1883
An Act for extending the powers of the Telegraph Construction and Maintenance Company Limited; and for other purposes.
St. Peter's (Clifton Bristol) Church Act 1883	46 & 47 Vict. c. xvi	31 May 1883
An Act for authorising the Sale of the old Church of Saint Peter (Clifton) in the City of Bristol and of premises connected therewith.
Leatherhead and District Waterworks Act 1883 (repealed)	46 & 47 Vict. c. xvii	31 May 1883
An Act for incorporating and conferring Powers on the Leatherhead and District Waterworks Company. (Repealed by East Surrey Water Order 1963 (SI 1963/657))
Local Government Board's Provisional Orders Confirmation Act 1883	46 & 47 Vict. c. xviii	18 June 1883
An Act to confirm certain Provisional Orders of the Local Government Board relating to the Local Government District of Abertillery, the Rural Sanitary Districts of the Horsham and Penzance Unions, the Boroughs of Portsmouth and Scarborough, the Local Government Districts of Shirley-and-Freemantle and Staines, the City of Truro, and the Local Government Districts of Walton-on-the-Hill and Wimbledon.
	Abertillery Order 1883	
	Horsham Union Order 1883	
	Penzance Union Order 1883	
	Portsmouth Union Order 1883	
	Scarborough Order 1883	
	Shirley-and-Freemantle Order 1883	
	Staines Order 1883	
	Truro Order 1883	
	Walton-on-the-Hill Order 1883	
	Wimbledon Order 1883	
Broughty Ferry Paving Act 1883 (repealed)	46 & 47 Vict. c. xix	18 June 1883
An Act to confirm a Provisional Order made under the General Police and Improvement (Scotland) Act, 1862, (Note: General Police and Improvement (Scotland) Act 1862 (25 & 26 Vict. c. 101)) relating to the Burgh of Broughty Ferry. (Repealed by Dundee Boundaries Act 1913 (3 & 4 Geo. 5. c. lxxx))
Swansea Harbour Act 1883	46 & 47 Vict. c. xx	18 June 1883
An Act to extend the time limited by the Swansea Harbour Act 1874 (Note: Swansea Harbour Act 1874 (37 & 38 Vict. c. civ)) for the completion of the Docks Railways and Works by that Act authorised; to enable the Swansea Harbour Trustees to raise a further sum of Money for the purposes of their Undertaking; and to annul a certain Agreement between the Swansea Harbour Trustees and the Corporation of Swansea.
Drainage and Improvement of Lands Supplemental (Ireland) Act 1883	46 & 47 Vict. c. xxi	18 June 1883
An Act to confirm certain Provisional Orders under the Drainage and Improvement of Lands (Ireland) Act, 1863, (Note: Drainage and Improvement of Lands (Ireland) Act 1863 (26 & 27 Vict. c. 88)) and the Acts amending the same.
	Milford Drainage District Order 1883	
	Hogans Pass Drainage District Order 1883	
	Owenroe or Moynalty River Drainage District Order 1883	
	Swilly Burn Drainage District Order 1883	
Scottish Widows' Fund and Life Assurance Society's Act 1883 (repealed)	46 & 47 Vict. c. xxii	18 June 1883
An Act to confer further powers on the Ordinary Courts of Directors of the Scottish Widows' Fund and Life Assurance Society. (Repealed by Scottish Widows' Fund and Life Assurance Society's Act 1926 (16 & 17 Geo. 5. c. lxxviii))
Metropolitan Street Improvements Act 1877 (Amendment) Act 1883	46 & 47 Vict. c. xxiii	18 June 1883
An Act for amending the Metropolitan Street Improvements Act, 1877. (Note: Metropolitan Street Improvements Act 1877 (40 & 41 Vict. c. ccxxxv))
Caledonian and Glasgow and South Western Railways (Joint Lines) Act 1883	46 & 47 Vict. c. xxiv	18 June 1883
An Act for enabling the Caledonian and the Glasgow and South-western Railway Companies to execute certain Works and acquire certain Lands in the Counties of Renfrew, Lanark and Ayr, in connexion with their Glasgow and Paisley and Glasgow and Kilmarnock Joint Lines of Railway; and for other purposes.
North London Railway Act 1883	46 & 47 Vict. c. xxv	18 June 1883
An Act to confer further Powers upon the North London Railway Company for the acquisition of Lands and the raising of Capital; and to empower the London and North-western Railway Company to subscribe towards such Capital; and for other purposes.
Standard Life Assurance Company's Act 1883 (repealed)	46 & 47 Vict. c. xxvi	18 June 1883
An Act for amending and extending the Acts relating to the Standard Life Assurance Company, and for making further provisions with respect thereto. (Repealed by Standard Life Assurance Company's Act 1910 (10 Edw. 7 & 1 Geo. 5. c. x))
Hull Docks Act 1883	46 & 47 Vict. c. xxvii	18 June 1883
An Act to amend the Acts relating to the Dock Company at Kingston-upon-Hull; to confer further Powers on the said Company; and for other Purposes.
Lambeth Waterworks Act 1883	46 & 47 Vict. c. xxviii	18 June 1883
An Act to extend the powers of the Company of Proprietors of Lambeth Waterworks.
Dublin (South) City Market (Amendment) Act 1883	46 & 47 Vict. c. xxix	18 June 1883
An Act to amend the Dublin (South) City Market Acts 1876 (Note: Dublin (South) City Market Act 1876 (39 & 40 Vict. c. ccxxxii)) and 1879; (Note: Dublin (South) City Market Amendment Act 1879 (42 & 43 Vict. c. clxviii)) and for other purposes.
Tramways Order (Dublin and Blessington) Confirmation Act 1883	46 & 47 Vict. c. xxx	18 June 1883
An Act to confirm a Provisional Order made by the Lord Lieutenant of Ireland in Council, under the Tramways (Ireland) Act, 1860, (Note: Tramways (Ireland) Act 1860 (23 & 24 Vict. c. 152)) extending the time for the completion of the Dublin and Blessington Steam Tramways.
	Dublin and Blessington Steam Tramway (Extension of Time) Order 1883	
Cheshire Lines Act 1883	46 & 47 Vict. c. xxxi	18 June 1883
An Act for conferring further powers upon the Cheshire Lines Committee and for other purposes.
Portishead District Water Act 1883	46 & 47 Vict. c. xxxii	18 June 1883
An Act for authorising the Portishead District Water Company to construct additional Works and to purchase additional Lands and for other purposes.
Exeter Canal Act 1883	46 & 47 Vict. c. xxxiii	18 June 1883
An Act for sanctioning a settlement of the claims of the Mortgagees of the Exeter Canal against the Corporation of the City of Exeter; for empowering the Corporation to borrow for the purpose of carrying into effect such settlement and of improving the said Canal and for other purposes.
Corris Railway Act 1883	46 & 47 Vict. c. xxxiv	18 June 1883
An Act to enable the Corris Railway Company to use their Railways for Passenger Traffic and for other purposes.
Wigan District (Mines and Sewers) Act 1883	46 & 47 Vict. c. xxxv	18 June 1883
An Act to make provision with respect to the support of public sewers and sewage works in the mining districts in the borough of Wigan and neighbouring places.
Metropolitan Railway Act 1883	46 & 47 Vict. c. xxxvi	18 June 1883
An Act to authorise the Metropolitan Railway Company to raise addi¬ tional Capital to amend their Acts and for other purposes.
Faculty of Procurators in Paisley Act 1883 (repealed)	46 & 47 Vict. c. xxxvii	18 June 1883
An Act for regulating the Faculty of Procurators in Paisley; for making provision for the present and contingent Liabilities thereof; for the distribution of the Funds and the ultimate dissolution of the Faculty; and for other relative purposes. (Repealed by Statute Law (Repeals) Act 1998 (c. 43))
Halesowen Gas Act 1883	46 & 47 Vict. c. xxxviii	18 June 1883
An Act for incorporating and conferring powers on the Halesowen Gas Company, and for other purposes.
East and West India Dock Company's Act 1883 (repealed)	46 & 47 Vict. c. xxxix	18 June 1883
An Act to confirm an Agreement between the London, Tilbury, and Southend Railway Company and the East and West India Dock Company, with reference to a supply of water and for other purposes. (Repealed by Port of London (Consolidation) Act 1920 (10 & 11 Geo. 5. c. clxxiii))
Local Government Board (Ireland) Provisional Orders Confirmation (Rathmines, &c.) Act 1883	46 & 47 Vict. c. xl	18 June 1883
An Act to confirm certain Provisional Orders of the Local Government Board for Ireland relating to the township of Ratbmines and Rathgar, and to the towns of Tralee and Warrenpoint.
	Rathmines and Rathgar Provisional Order 1883	
	Town of Tralee Provisional Order 1883	
	Warrenpoint Provisional Order 1883	
Watford Gas Act 1883	46 & 47 Vict. c. xli	18 June 1883
An Act to enable the Watford Gas and Coke Company to erect and maintain additional works to acquire more land and to raise further capital and for other purposes.
Education Department Provisional Orders Confirmation (Cummersdale, &c.) Act 1883	46 & 47 Vict. c. xlii	18 June 1883
An Act to confirm certain Provisional Orders made by the Education Department under the Elementary Education Act, 1870, (Note: Elementary Education Act 1870 (33 & 34 Vict. c. 75)) to enable the School Boards for Cummersdale, Cumberland; Hayfield, Derbyshire; Little Eaton, Derbyshire; Stroud, Gloucestershire; and Treuddyn, Flintshire, to put in force the Lands Clauses Consolidation Act, 1845, (Note: Lands Clauses Consolidation Act 1845 (8 & 9 Vict. c. 18)) and the Acts amending the same.
	Cummersdale Order 1883	
	Hayfield Order 1883	
	Little Eaton Order 1883	
	Stroud Order 1883	
	Treuddyn Order 1883	
Pier and Harbour Orders Confirmation (No. 1) Act 1883	46 & 47 Vict. c. xliii	29 June 1883
An Act to confirm certain Provisional Orders made by the Board of Trade under the General Pier and Harbour Act, 1861, (Note: General Pier and Harbour Act 1861 (24 & 25 Vict. c. 45)) relating to Inverness, Lamlash, Leven, Methil, Porthleven, Truro, and Wick and Pulteney.
	Inverness Harbour Order 1883	
	Lamlash Pier Order 1883	
	Leven Harbour Order 1883	
	Methil Harbour Order 1883	
	Porthleven Harbour Order 1883	
	Truro Harbour Order 1883	
	Wick and Pulteney Harbours Order 1883	
Local Government Board (Ireland) Provisional Order Confirmation (Killarney Waterworks) Act 1883	46 & 47 Vict. c. xliv	29 June 1883
An Act to confirm a Provisional Order of the Local Government Board for Ireland relating to Waterworks in the town of Killarney.
	Killarney Waterworks Provisional Order 1883	
Pier and Harbour Orders Confirmation (No. 2) Act 1883	46 & 47 Vict. c. xlv	29 June 1883
An Act to confirm a Provisional Order made by the Board of Trade under the General Pier and Harbour Act, 1861, relating to Whitby.
	Whitby Port and Harbour Order 1883	
Gas and Water Orders Confirmation Act 1883	46 & 47 Vict. c. xlvi	29 June 1883
An Act to confirm certain Provisional Orders made by the Board of Trade under the Gas and Water Works Facilities Act, 1870, (Note: Gas and Water Works Facilities Act 1870 (33 & 34 Vict. c. 70)) relating to Bilston Gas, Broadstairs Gas, Caine Gas, Enfield Gas, Ferndale Gas, Saint Neots Gas, Tadcaster and Wetherby District Gas, Swanage Gas and Water, and Ystrad Gas and Water.
	Bilston Gas Order 1883	
	Broadstairs Gas Order 1883	
	Calne Gas Order 1883	
	Enfield Gas Order 1883	
	Ferndale Gas Order 1883	
	St. Neots Gas Order 1883	
	Tadcaster and Wetherby District Gas Order 1883	
	Swanage Gas and Water Order 1883	
	Ystrad Gas and Water Order 1883	
Tramways Orders Confirmation (No. 2) Act 1883	46 & 47 Vict. c. xlvii	29 June 1883
An Act to confirm certain Provisional Orders made by the Board of Trade under the Tramways Act, 1870, (Note: Tramways Act 1870 (33 & 34 Vict. c. 78)) relating to Birmingham and Western District Tramways, Edgbaston and Harbome Tramways, North Birmingham Tramways, Oldham, Ashton-under-Lyne, Hyde and District Tramways, South Birmingham Tramways, and Southend-on-Sea and District Tramways.
	Birmingham and Western Districts Tramways Order 1883	
	Edgbaston and Harborne Tramways Order 1883	
	North Birmingham Tramways Order 1883	
	Oldham, Ashton-under-Lyne, Hyde and District Tramways Order 1883	
	South Birmingham Tramways Order 1883	
	Southend-on-Sea and District Tramways Order 1883	
Water Orders Confirmation Act 1883	46 & 47 Vict. c. xlviii	29 June 1883
An Act to confirm certain Provisional Orders made by the Board of Trade under the Gas and Water Works Facilities Act, 1870, relating to Blandford District Water, Farnborough District Water, Gosport Water, Herne Bay Water, Newmarket Water, Newport and Pillgwenlly Water, and Pontypridd Water.
	Blandford District Water Order 1883	
	Farnborough District Waterworks Order 1883	
	Gosport Water Order 1883	
	Herne Water Order 1883	
	Newmarket Water Order 1883	
	Newport and Pillgwenlly Water Order 1883	
	Pontypridd Water Order 1883	
Hounslow and Metropolitan Railway Act 1883	46 & 47 Vict. c. xlix	29 June 1883
An Act for conferring further powers on the Hounslow and Metropolitan Railway Company; and for other purposes.
Workington Local Board Water Act 1883	46 & 47 Vict. c. l	29 June 1883
An Act for empowering the Local Board of Health for the District of Workington in the County of Cumberland to take water from the River Derwent to construct Waterworks and to supply water and to enable the Cockermouth and Workington Joint Water Committee and the said Local Board to agree for the transfer to the said Local Board of the undertaking of the said Joint Committee and for other purpose.
East London Railway Act 1883	46 & 47 Vict. c. li	29 June 1883
An Act to vary and extend the powers of the East London Railway Company in respect of the Railway authorised by the East London Railway Act 1882 (Note: East London Railway Act 1882 (45 & 46 Vict. c. clxxxi)) to expedite the opening of a connexion by Railway between the North and South sides of the River Thames and for other purposes.
Great Western and Llynvi and Ogmore Railways Amalgamation Act 1883	46 & 47 Vict. c. lii	29 June 1883
An Act for amalgamating the Llynvi and Ogmore Railway Company with the Great Western Railway Company.
Laws' Patent Act 1883	46 & 47 Vict. c. liii	29 June 1883
An Act for rendering valid certain Letters Patent granted to Joseph Law and Henry Law for "Improvements in appliances for heating hardening and tempering wire used in the manufacture of Cards for Carding Fibres."
Cambrian Railways Act 1883	46 & 47 Vict. c. liv	29 June 1883
An Act to authorise the Cambrian Railways Company to extend their Pier and Works at Aberdovey to purchase land at Abereirch to establish Hotels and Refreshment Rooms in connexion with their Railway to establish Savings Banks and for other purposes.
Downham and Stoke Ferry Railway Act 1883	46 & 47 Vict. c. lv	29 June 1883
An Act for authorising the Downham and Stoke Ferry Railway Company to extend their Railway to Gooderstone to raise further money and for other purposes.
Great Eastern, Tendring Hundred and Clacton-on-Sea Railways Act 1883	46 & 47 Vict. c. lvi	29 June 1883
An Act for the sale and transfer to the Great Eastern Railway Company of the Undertakings of the Tendring Hundred Railway Company and of the Clacton-on-Sea Railway Company; and for other purposes.
Sheffield Corporation Act 1883 (repealed)	46 & 47 Vict. c. lvii	29 June 1883
An Act to provide for the Conversion of Statutable Securities of the Corporation of Sheffield into Corporation Stock; to make better provision and enlarge the powers of the Corporation with respect to sanitary matters and matters of Local Government Police and the Administration of Justice; to authorise the Corporation to raise Money for Tramway purposes and for Loans to certain public bodies within the Borough; and for other purposes. (Repealed by Sheffield Corporation (Consolidation) Act 1918 (8 & 9 Geo. 5. c. lxi))
Staveley Waterworks (Transfer, &c.) Act 1883 (repealed)	46 & 47 Vict. c. lviii	29 June 1883
An Act for transferring to the Rural Sanitary Authority for the rural sanitary district of the Chesterfield Union in the county of Derby the undertaking of the Staveley Waterworks Company and for the dissolution of that Company and for other purposes. (Repealed by North Derbyshire Water Board Order 1962 (SI 1963/660))
Belfast Harbour Act 1883	46 & 47 Vict. c. lix	29 June 1883
An Act for amending the provisions of the Belfast Harbour Acts respecting the constitution and election of the Belfast Harbour Commissioners; and for conferring on the said Commissioners further Powers in relation to Victoria Park; and for other purposes.
Aberdeen Extension and Improvement Act 1883 (repealed)	46 & 47 Vict. c. lx	29 June 1883
An Act to extend the Municipal Boundary of the City of Aberdeen; to authorise the Town Council to make new streets, execute certain street improvements, and construct a connecting railway to the Gasworks; and for other purposes. (Repealed by Aberdeen Corporation (Administration Finance &c.) Order Confirmation Act 1940 (3 & 4 Geo. 6. c. iii))
Glasgow and South Western Railway Act 1883	46 & 47 Vict. c. lxi	29 June 1883
An Act for conferring further powers on the Glasgow and South-western Railway Company for the construction of Works and the acquisition of Lands and for vesting in them the Saint Enoch Station at Glasgow and for empowering them to raise Additional Capital and for other purposes.
Longton Improvement Act 1883 (repealed)	46 & 47 Vict. c. lxii	29 June 1883
An Act to extend the Borough of Longton and to make further provision for the Improvement and good Government of the Borough and for other purposes. (Repealed by Staffordshire Act 1983 (c. xviii))
North Eastern Railway (General) Act 1883	46 & 47 Vict. c. lxiii	29 June 1883
An Act for enabling the North-eastern Railway Company to make new Railways and for conferring additional Powers on the Company in relation to their own undertaking and the undertakings of other Companies; and for other purposes.
Waterford and Limerick Railway Act 1883	46 & 47 Vict. c. lxiv	29 June 1883
An Act to authorise the Waterford and Limerick Railway Company to raise further Capital and for other purposes.
Wrexham, Mold and Connah's Quay Railway Act 1883	46 & 47 Vict. c. lxv	29 June 1883
An Act to enable the Wrexham Mold and Connah's Quay Railway Company to make New Railways to raise further Capital and for other purposes.
Glasgow, Yoker and Clydebank Railway Act 1883	46 & 47 Vict. c. lxvi	29 June 1883
An Act to authorise the Glasgow Yoker and Clydebank Railway Company to make a Railway in the Parish of Govan and for other purposes.
London, Chatham and Dover Railway Act 1883	46 & 47 Vict. c. lxvii	29 June 1883
An Act for conferring further powers on the London Chatham and Dover Railway Company and for other purposes.
North British Railway Act 1883	46 & 47 Vict. c. lxviii	29 June 1883
An Act to authorise a Railway in Alloa Parish from the North British Railway to the Alloa Railway; to confirm an agreement as to running powers, &c.; to extend to ships not freighted the obligation of the North British Railway Company to tow ships freighted under the Tay Viaduct; and for other purposes.
Deaf and Dumb Poor Asylum Act 1883	46 & 47 Vict. c. lxix	29 June 1883
An Act to enable the President Vice-Presidents Treasurer and Governors of the Asylum for the Deaf and Dumb Poor to acquire by Agreement and to hold the fee simple and inheritance of the site of the Institution and premises in the Old Kent Road and for other purposes.
Birmingham Corporation (Consolidation) Act 1883	46 & 47 Vict. c. lxx	29 June 1883
An Act to consolidate with amendments the Local Acts and Orders in force in the Borough of Birmingham and for other purposes.
Heywood Corporation Act 1883	46 & 47 Vict. c. lxxi	29 June 1883
An Act to make better provision in relation to the gas and water supply health local government and improvement of the borough of Heywood the borrowing of money and for other purposes.
Liverpool Improvement Act 1883 (repealed)	46 & 47 Vict. c. lxxii	29 June 1883
An Act for making further Provision respecting the continuation already authorised of Pall Mall and Ray Street in the city of Liverpool; and for other purposes. (Repealed by County of Merseyside Act 1980 (c. x))
Canvey Island (Sea Defences) Act 1883 (repealed)	46 & 47 Vict. c. lxxiii	29 June 1883
An Act for more effectually protecting from Inundation by the Sea and for otherwise improving the Island of Canvey in the County of Essex and for other purposes. (Repealed by Essex River and South Essex Water Act 1969 (c. xlix))
Penzance Corporation Act 1883	46 & 47 Vict. c. lxxiv	29 June 1883
An Act for repealing and re-enacting portions of the Acts and Order relating to the Harbour of Penzance and for other purposes.
Bristol Port and Channel Dock Act 1883	46 & 47 Vict. c. lxxv	29 June 1883
An Act to authorise the Bristol Port and Channel Dock Company to create and issue a New Debenture Stock and for other purposes.
Borrowstounness Harbour Act 1883	46 & 47 Vict. c. lxxvi	29 June 1883
An Act to confer further powers with respect to the Borrowstounness Harbour; and for other purposes.
Burnley Borough Improvement Act 1883	46 & 47 Vict. c. lxxvii	29 June 1883
An Act to amend and extend the Acts relating to the Borough of Burnley and to make further provision for its Local Government and Improvement to authorise the Construction of new Waterworks and for other purposes.
Nottingham Corporation Act 1883	46 & 47 Vict. c. lxxviii	29 June 1883
An Act for conferring further powers on the Corporation of Nottingham with respect to street improvements and to the supply of water and gas and to other matters of local government for making further provisions with respect to certain allotments and roads in the borough and for other purposes.
Thames Act 1883 (repealed)	46 & 47 Vict. c. lxxix	29 June 1883
An Act to make provision for regulating the navigation of the River Thames between Cricklade in the county of Wilts and Yantlet Creek in the county of Kent and to confer further powers on the Conservators of the River Thames and for other purposes relating thereto. (Repealed by Thames Conservancy Act 1894 (57 & 58 Vict. c. clxxxvii))
Local Government Board's Provisional Orders Confirmation (Poor Law) Act 1883	46 & 47 Vict. c. lxxx	16 July 1883
An Act to confirm certain Orders of the Local Government Board under the provisions of the Divided Parishes and Poor Law Amendment Act, 1876, (Note: Divided Parishes and Poor Law Amendment Act 1876 (39 & 40 Vict. c. 61)) as amended and extended by the Poor Law Act, 1879, (Note: Poor Law Act 1879 (42 & 43 Vict. c. 54)) and the Divided Parishes and Poor Law Amendment Act, 1882, (Note: Divided Parishes and Poor Law Amendment Act 1882 (45 & 46 Vict. c. 58)) relating to the Parishes of Brafield-on-the-Green, Brentor, Cairau, Clungunford, Cogenhoe or Cooknoe, Courteenhall, Cwmcarvan, Great-Houghton, Hope Mansell, Hopton-Castle, Horton, Lamerton, Lew-Trenchard, Little-Houghton, Llandough, Llangaffo, Llangeinwen, Lower Slaughter, Michaelstone-super-Ely, Mitchel-Troy, Newington-Bagpath, Newland, Owlpen, Pennarth, Peterstone-super-Ely, Peter-Tavy, Road or Rode, Ruardean, Saint Bride-super-Ely, Saint Fagans, Tavistock, Thrushelton, Upper-Slaughter, Walford, Whitchurch, and Wootton, to the Townships of Brimington, Claylane, Coal-Aston, Morton, North-Wingfield, Pilsley, Tapton, Unstone, and Woodthorpe, and to the Tything of Lea-Bailey.
	Cairau, Llandough, Michaelstone super Ely, Pennarth, Peterstone super Ely, St. Bride super Ely, and St. Fagans (Glam. and Mon.) Order 1883	
	Llangeinwen and Llangaffo (Carnarvon and Anglesey) Order 1883	
	Birmingham Claylane, Coal Aston, Morton, North Wingfield, Pilsey, Tapton, Unstone, and Woodthorpe (Derb.) Order 1883	
	Clungunford and Hopton Castle (Salop. and Montgomery) Order 1883	
	Newington Bagpath and Owlpen (Glos. and Wilts.) Order 1883	
	Brafield on the Green, Cogenhoe or Cooknoe, Courteenhall, Gt. Houghton, Horton, Little Houghton, Road or Rode, and Wootton (Northants.) Order 1883	
	Cwmcarvan and Mitchel Troy (Mon., Glos., and Hereford) Order 1883	
	Newland and Ruardean (Mon., Glos., and Hereford) Order 1883	
	Ross Union (Herefordshire and Glos.) Order (1) 1883	
	Ross Union (Herefordshire and Glos.) Order (2) 1883	
	Lower Slaughter and Upper Slaughter (Glos. and Worcs.) Order 1883	
	Brentnor, Lamerton, Lew Trenchard, Peter Tavy, Tavistock, Thrushelton, and Whitechurch (Devon and Cornwall) Order 1883	
Local Government Board's Provisional Orders Confirmation (Poor Law) (No. 3) Act 1883	46 & 47 Vict. c. lxxxi	16 July 1883
An Act to confirm certain Provisional Orders of the Local Government Board under the provisions of the Poor Law Amendment Act, 1867, (Note: Poor Law Amendment Act 1867 (30 & 31 Vict. c. 106)) as amended by the Poor Law Amendment Act, 1868, (Note: Poor Law Amendment Act 1868 (31 & 32 Vict. c. 122)) and extended by the Poor Law Act, 1879, relating to the Parishes of Birmingham and Lambeth.
	Birmingham Order 1883	
	Lambeth Order 1883	
Local Government Board's Provisional Order Confirmation (Highways) Act 1883	46 & 47 Vict. c. lxxxii	16 July 1883
An Act to confirm a Provisional Order of the Local Government Board under the Highways and Locomotives (Amendment) Act, 1878, (Note: Highways and Locomotives (Amendment) Act 1878 (41 & 42 Vict. c. 77)) relating to the county of Dorset.
	County of Dorset Order 1883	
Local Government Board (Ireland) Provisional Orders Confirmation (Carlow, Listowel and Newtownards) Act 1883	46 & 47 Vict. c. lxxxiii	16 July 1883
An Act to confirm Provisional Orders of the Local Government Board for Ireland relating to the towns of Carlow and Listowel, and to the Newtownards Gas Undertaking.
	Carlow Town Provisional Order 1883	
	Newtownards Gas Order 1883	
Inclosure (Hildersham) Provisional Order Confirmation Act 1883	46 & 47 Vict. c. lxxxiv	16 July 1883
An Act to confirm the Provisional Order for the inclosure of the Common Fields and Pastures, situate in the parish of Hildersham, in the county of Cambridge, in pursuance of a Report of the Land Commissioners for England.
	Hildersham Order 1883	
Land Drainage Supplemental (No. 2) Act 1883 (repealed)	46 & 47 Vict. c. lxxxv	16 July 1883
An Act to confirm a Provisional Order under the Land Drainage Act, 1861, relating to Didcot Improvements, situate in the several parishes of Didcot, East Hagbourne, and Long Wittenham, and in the chapelry of Appleford in the parish of Sutton Courtney, in the county of Berks. (Repealed by Statute Law (Repeals) Act 1993 (c. 50))
New Forest Highways Act 1883 (repealed)	46 & 47 Vict. c. lxxxvi	16 July 1883
An Act to provide for the repair and maintenance of certain Highways in the New Forest in the county of Southampton. (Repealed by Wild Creatures and Forest Laws Act 1971 (c. 47))
East and West Dean (Highways) Act 1883 (repealed)	46 & 47 Vict. c. lxxxvii	16 July 1883
An Act to provide for the repair and maintenance of certain Highways in the Forest of Dean in the county of Gloucester. (Repealed by Wild Creatures and Forest Laws Act 1971 (c. 47))
Drainage and Improvement of Lands Supplemental (Ireland) (No. 2) Act 1883	46 & 47 Vict. c. lxxxviii	16 July 1883
An Act to confirm certain Provisional Orders under the Drainage and Improvement of Lands (Ireland) Act, 1863, and the Acts amending the same.
	Shiven River Drainage District Order 1883	
	Nanny River Drainage District Order 1883	
Local Government Board's Provisional Orders Confirmation (No. 3) Act 1883	46 & 47 Vict. c. lxxxix	16 July 1883
An Act to confirm certain Provisional Orders of the Local Government Board relating to the Improvement Act District of Bethesda, the Borough of Darlington, the Evesham Joint Hospital District, the Faversham Joint Hospital District, the Improvement Act District of Kington, the Lower Thames Valley Main Sewerage District, the Boroughs of Maldon and Sandwich, and the Local Government Districts of Torquay, and Wanstead and Woodford.
	Bethesda Order 1883	
	Darlington Order 1883	
	Evesham Joint Hospital Order 1883	
	Faversham Joint Hospital Order 1883	
	Kington Order 1883	
	Lower Thames Valley Order 1883	
	Maldon Order 1883	
	Sandwich Order 1883	
	Torquay Order 1883	
	Wanstead and Woodford Order 1883	
Local Government Board's Provisional Orders Confirmation (No. 6) Act 1883	46 & 47 Vict. c. xc	16 July 1883
An Act to confirm certain Provisional Orders of the Local Government Board relating to the Rural Sanitary District of the Barnet Union, the Local Government Districts of Brentford, Chilvers Coton, and Nuneaton, the Stourbridge Main Drainage District, the Borough of Stratford-upon-Avon, the Rural Sanitary District of the Stroud Union, and the Local Government District of Wellington (Somerset).
	Barnet Union Order 1883	
	Brentford Order 1883	
	Chilvers Coton Order 1883	
	Nuneaton Order 1883	
	Stourbridge Order 1883	
	Stratford-upon-Avon Order 1883	
	Stroud Union Order 1883	
	Wellington (Somerset) Order 1883	
Local Government Board's Provisional Order Confirmation (No. 10) Act 1883 (repealed)	46 & 47 Vict. c. xci	16 July 1883
An Act to confirm a Provisional Order of the Local Government Board relating to the Borough of Leeds. (Repealed by Leeds Corporation (Consolidation) Act 1905 (5 Edw. 7. c. i))
Local Government Board (Ireland) Provisional Order Confirmation (Limerick Waterworks) Act 1883	46 & 47 Vict. c. xcii	16 July 1883
An Act to confirm a Provisional Order of the Local Government Board for Ireland relating to Waterworks in the city of Limerick.
	Limerick Waterworks Provisional Order 1883	
Tramways Orders Confirmation (No. 4) Act 1883	46 & 47 Vict. c. xciii	16 July 1883
An Act to confirm certain Provisional Orders made by the Board of Trade under the Tramways Act, 1870, relating to South Shields Corporation Tramways, and Wolverton and Stony Stratford Tramways.
	South Shields Corporation Tramways (Amendment) Order 1883	
	Wolverton and Stony Stratford Tramways Order 1883	
Metropolis (Tench Street, St. George-in-the-East) Provisional Order Confirmation Act 1883	46 & 47 Vict. c. xciv	16 July 1883
An Act to confirm a Provisional Order of one of Her Majesty's Principal Secretaries of State for the improvement of an unhealthy area situated at Saint George-in-the-East, within the Metropolis.
	Tench Street, St. George-in-the-East Order 1883	
Metropolis (Brook Street, Limehouse) Provisional Order Confirmation Act 1883	46 & 47 Vict. c. xcv	16 July 1883
An Act to confirm a Provisional Order of one of Her Majesty's Principal Secretaries of State for the improvement of an unhealthy area situated at Limehouse, within the Metropolis.
	Brook Street, Limehouse Order 1883	
Metropolis (Windmill Row, New Cut, Lambeth) Provisional Order Confirmation Act 1883	46 & 47 Vict. c. xcvi	16 July 1883
An Act to confirm a Provisional Order of one of Her Majesty's Principal Secretaries of State for the improvement of an unhealthy area situated in Lambeth, within the Metropolis.
	Windmill Row, New Cut, Lambeth Order 1883	
Metropolis (Trafalgar Road, Greenwich) Provisional Order Confirmation Act 1883	46 & 47 Vict. c. xcvii	16 July 1883
An Act to confirm a Provisional Order of one of Her Majesty's Principal Secretaries of State for the improvement of an unhealthy area situated at Greenwich, within the Metropolis.
	Trafalgar Road, Greenwich Order 1883	
Fraserburgh Waterworks Confirmation Act 1883	46 & 47 Vict. c. xcviii	16 July 1883
An Act to confirm a Provisional Order made under the Public Health (Scotland) Act, 1867, (Note: Public Health (Scotland) Act 1867 (30 & 31 Vict. c. 101)) relating to the burgh of Fraserburgh.
	Fraserburgh Waterworks Order 1883	
Local Government Board's Provisional Orders Confirmation (No. 8) Act 1883	46 & 47 Vict. c. xcix	16 July 1883
An Act to confirm certain Provisional Orders of the Local Government Board relating to the Boroughs of Kingston-upon-Hull and Leeds, and the District of Weston-super-Mare.
	Kingston-upon-Hull Order 1883	
	Weston-super-Mare Order 1883	
Anstruther and St. Andrews Railway Act 1883	46 & 47 Vict. c. c	16 July 1883
An Act to authorise the Anstruther and Saint Andrews Railway Company to construct an extension of their authorised Railway to join the Saint Andrews Branch Railway of the North British Railway; and for other purposes.
Maryport and Carlisle Railway Act 1883	46 & 47 Vict. c. ci	16 July 1883
An Act to enable the Maryport and Carlisle Railway Company to reduce the Maximum Tolls and Rates chargeable upon their Railways and to make such reduced Tolls and Rates permanent and binding on the Company.
Seafield Dock and Railway Act 1883	46 & 47 Vict. c. cii	16 July 1883
An Act for authorising the Construction of a Dock at Seafield in the County of Fife with Railways thereto and for other purposes.
Brighton Corporation Waterworks Act 1883 (repealed)	46 & 47 Vict. c. ciii	16 July 1883
An Act to enable the Corporation of Brighton to raise further Moneys for their Waterworks Undertaking. (Repealed by Brighton Corporation Act 1931 (21 & 22 Geo. 5. c. cix))
Blackrock and Kingstown Tramways Act 1883	46 & 47 Vict. c. civ	16 July 1883
An Act to authorise the construction of Tramways in the Township of Blackrock and in the Township of Kingstown in the County of Dublin and for other purposes.
Castlederg and Victoria Bridge Tramway Act 1883	46 & 47 Vict. c. cv	16 July 1883
An Act for the construction of a Tramway from Castlederg to Victoria Bridge in the County of Tyrone and for other purposes.
Glasgow Corporation Loans Act 1883	46 & 47 Vict. c. cvi	16 July 1883
An Act to make further provision respecting the borrowing of Money by the Corporation of Glasgow and for other purposes.
Great Eastern Railway (General Powers) Act 1883	46 & 47 Vict. c. cvii	16 July 1883
An Act to authorise the Great Eastern Railway Company to construct additional Railways and to improve parts of their existing Railway in the County of Essex; to construct a Graving Dock at Harwich; to execute other works; to purchase additional lands and to exercise further powers; and for other purposes.
Wrexham, Mold and Connah's Quay Railway (Capital Arrangements) Act 1883	46 & 47 Vict. c. cviii	16 July 1883
An Act to enable the Wrexham Mold and Connah’s Quay Railway Company to consolidate their debenture and other stocks and share capital and to raise a further sum of money for their Undertaking and for other purposes.
Alliance and Dublin Gas Act 1883	46 & 47 Vict. c. cix	16 July 1883
An Act to alter and amend the Acts relating to the Alliance and Dublin Consumers' Gas Company; to enable that Company to acquire further lands, to raise additional capital; and for other purposes.
London and North Western Railway (New Railways) Act 1883	46 & 47 Vict. c. cx	16 July 1883
An Act for empowering the London and North-western Railway Company to construct New Railways and for vesting in them the Undertaking of the Lancashire Union Railways Company and for other purposes.
Midland Railway (Additional Powers) Act 1883	46 & 47 Vict. c. cxi	16 July 1883
An Act to confer additional Powers upon the Midland Railway Company for the construction of Railways and other Works and the Acquisition of Lands; for Confirming Agreements with other Companies; for raising further Capital; and for other purposes.
Portsmouth Street Tramways (Amalgamation) Act 1883	46 & 47 Vict. c. cxii	16 July 1883
An Act for authorising the amalgamation of the Undertakings of the Portsmouth Street Tramways Company the Gosport Street Tramways Company and the General Tramways Company of Portsmouth Limited and for other purposes.
Pewsey and Salisbury Railway Act 1883 (repealed)	46 & 47 Vict. c. cxiii	16 July 1883
An Act to authorise the making of a Railway in Wiltshire to be called the Pewsey and Salisbury Railway. (Repealed by Pewsey and Salisbury Railway (Abandonment) Act 1891 (54 & 55 Vict. c. x))
Kirkcaldy and District Tramways Act 1883 (repealed)	46 & 47 Vict. c. cxiv	16 July 1883
An Act to authorise the construction of the Kirkcaldy and District Tramways, in the County of Fife; and for other purposes. (Repealed by Kirkcaldy and District Tramways (Abandonment) Act 1887 (50 & 51 Vict. c. lxi))
Ribble Navigation and Preston Dock Act 1883 (repealed)	46 & 47 Vict. c. cxv	16 July 1883
An Act for the transfer of the Undertakings of the Ribble Navigation Company to the Mayor Aldermen and Burgesses of the Borough of Preston and to enable them to improve the River Ribble and the Navigation thereof and to construct Docks and other works at Preston and for extending the Borough of Preston and for other purposes. (Repealed by Preston Borough Council Act 1981 (c. xxii))
Selby and Mid-Yorkshire Union Railway Act 1883 (repealed)	46 & 47 Vict. c. cxvi	16 July 1883
An Act to confer further powers on the Church Fenton Cawood and Wistow Railway Company; and for other purposes. (Repealed by Selby and Mid-Yorkshire Union Railway (Abandonment) Act 1890 (53 & 54 Vict. c. xii))
Billinghay and Metheringham Light Railway Act 1883 (repealed)	46 & 47 Vict. c. cxvii	16 July 1883
An Act for making a Railway from Bilhnghay to Metheringham in the County of Lincoln; and for other purposes. (Repealed by Billinghay and Metheringham (Light) Railway (Abandonment) Act 1888 (51 & 52 Vict. c. iv))
Cleator and Workington Junction Railway Act 1883	46 & 47 Vict. c. cxviii	16 July 1883
An Act to confer further Powers upon the Cleator and Workington Junction Railway Company for the Extension of their Railways; and for other purposes.
Halesowen Railway Act 1883	46 & 47 Vict. c. cxix	16 July 1883
An Act to amend the Halesowen and Bromsgrove Branch Railways Act, 1865, (Note: Halesowen and Bromsgrove Branch Railways Act 1865 (28 & 29 Vict. c. ccxxxiii)) and for other purposes.
Swindon and Cheltenham Extension Railway (Further Powers) Act 1883	46 & 47 Vict. c. cxx	16 July 1883
An Act to confer further Powers on the Swindon and Cheltenham Extension Railway Company; and for other purposes.
Swindon Marlborough and Andover Railway Act 1883	46 & 47 Vict. c. cxxi	16 July 1883
An Act for granting further Powers to the Swindon Marlborough and Andover Railway Company; and for other purposes.
Drypool Parish Burial Ground Act 1883	46 & 47 Vict. c. cxxii	16 July 1883
An Act to provide for the Sale and appropriation of portions of certain lands in the Township of Southcoates in the Parish of Drypool in the Borough of Kingston-upon-Hull known as the Drypool Parish Burial Ground and for the application of the moneys arising from such Sale and for other purposes.
Argyll Ship Canal Act 1883 (repealed)	46 & 47 Vict. c. cxxiii	16 July 1883
An Act for making a Canal from the Harbour of East Tarbert to West Loch Tarbert, in the County of Argyll, and Works in connection therewith, and for other purposes. (Repealed by Pier and Harbour Order Confirmation (No. 1) Act 1912 (2 & 3 Geo. 5. c. cxlv))
Holy Trinity, Coventry (Vicar's Rate) Act 1883	46 & 47 Vict. c. cxxiv	16 July 1883
An Act to provide for the abolition of the Vicar's Rate leviable in the Parish of the Holy Trinity, Coventry, in the County of Warwick; for securing an Income for the Vicar from other sources; and for other relative purposes.
Cork Corporation (Additional Money) Act 1883	46 & 47 Vict. c. cxxv	16 July 1883
An Act to enable the Mayor Aldermen and Burgesses of the Borough of Cork to raise a further Sum of Money for the purposes of the Bridges and Works authorised by the Cork Improvement Act, 1875. (Note: Cork Improvement Act 1875 (38 & 39 Vict. c. cix))
Saint Helens and District Tramways Act 1883	46 & 47 Vict. c. cxxvi	16 July 1883
An Act to authorise the Saint Helens and District Tramways Company to construct additional Tramways to use Steam or Mechanical Power upon their Tramways to abandon parts of their authorised Tramways and for other purposes.
Belfast and Northern Counties Railway Act 1883	46 & 47 Vict. c. cxxvii	16 July 1883
An Act to make further and other Provisions as to the Subscription by the Belfast and Northern Counties Railway Company to the Undertaking of the Limavady and Dungiven Railway Company; and as to the appointment of Directors of the Ballymena Cushendall and Redbay Railway Company; and for other purposes.
Ballymena, Cushendall, and Redbay Railway Act 1883	46 & 47 Vict. c. cxxviii	16 July 1883
An Act to revive and extend the Time limited by the Ballymena Cushendall and Redbay Railway Act 1878 (Note: Ballymena, Cushendall, and Redbay Railway Act 1878 (41 & 42 Vict. c. cxvii)) for the compulsory taking of Lands and to extend the Time limited by that Act for the completion of the Railway thereby authorised; and for other purposes.
Didcot, Newbury, and Southampton Railway Act 1883	46 & 47 Vict. c. cxxix	16 July 1883
An Act to consolidate the Capital of the Didcot Newbury and Southampton Junction Railway Company; to change the Name of the Company; and for other purposes.
Londonderry and Enniskillen Railway Amalgamation Act 1883	46 & 47 Vict. c. cxxx	16 July 1883
An Act for amalgamating the Londonderry and Enniskillen Railway Company with the Great Northern Railway Company (Ireland).
Tramways Orders Confirmation (No. 1) Act 1883	46 & 47 Vict. c. cxxxi	2 August 1883
An Act to confirm certain Provisional Orders made by the Board of Trade under the Tramways Act, 1870, relating to Aldershot and Famborough Tramways Extensions, Bradford Corporation Tramways, Hartlepool Tramways, Liverpool Corporation Tramways, Macclesfield Tramways, and North Staffordshire Tramways.
	Aldershot and Farnborough Tramways (Extension) Order 1883	
	Bradford Corporation Tramways Order 1883	
	Hartlepool Tramways Order 1883	
	Liverpool Corporation Tramways (Extensions) Order 1883	
	Macclesfield Tramways Order 1883	
	North Staffordshire Tramways Order 1883	
Education Department Provisional Order Confirmation (London) Act 1883	46 & 47 Vict. c. cxxxii	2 August 1883
An Act to confirm a Provisional Order made by the Education Department under the Elementary Education Act, 1870, to enable the School Board for London to put in force the Lands Clauses Consolidation Act, 1845, and the Acts amending the same.
	London Order 1883	
Tramways Orders Confirmation (No. 3) Act 1883	46 & 47 Vict. c. cxxxiii	2 August 1883
An Act to confirm certain Provisional Orders made by the Board of Trade under the Tramways Act, 1870, relating to Colchester Tramways, Halifax and District Tramways, Oxford Tramways Extensions, Rhyl, Voryd, and Plastirion Tramways, Spen Valley and District Tramways, and Yarmouth and Gorleston Tramways Extension.
	Colchester Tramways Order 1883	
	Halifax and Districts Tramways Order 1883	
	Oxford Tramways (Extensions) Order 1883	
	Rhyl, Voryd and Plastirion Tramways Order 1883	
	Spen Valley and District Tramways Order 1883	
	Yarmouth and Gorleston Tramways Extension Order 1883	
Local Government Board's (Gas) Provisional Order Confirmation Act 1883	46 & 47 Vict. c. cxxxiv	2 August 1883
An Act to confirm a Provisional Order of the Local Government Board under the provisions of the Gas and Water Works Facilities Act, 1870, and the Public Health Act, 1875, (Note: Public Health Act 1875 (38 & 39 Vict. c. 55)) relating to the Local Government District of Festiniog.
	Festiniog Gas Order 1883	
Local Government Board's Provisional Orders Confirmation (No. 4) Act 1883	46 & 47 Vict. c. cxxxv	2 August 1883
An Act to confirm certain Provisional Orders of the Local Government Board relating to the Borough of Cheltenham, the Local Government District of Croydon, the Borough of Dorchester, the Rural Sanitary District of the Hendon Union, and the Local Government Districts of Malvern and Willenhall.
	Cheltenham Order 1883	
	Croydon Order 1883	
	Dorchester Order 1883	
	Hendon Union Order 1883	
	Malvern Order 1883	
	Willenhall Order 1883	
Local Government Board's Provisional Orders Confirmation (No. 5) Act 1883	46 & 47 Vict. c. cxxxvi	2 August 1883
An Act to confirm certain Provisional Orders of the Local Government Board relating to the Local Government District of Ashton-in-Makerfield, the Borough of Ashton-under-Lyne and the Local Government Districts of Dukinfield and Hurst, the Boroughs of Burnley and Doncaster, the Town of Hove, the Local Government District of Hucknall-under-Huthwaite, the Improvement Act District of Llandudno, the Borough of Middlesbrough, the Port of Newport (Mon.), the Borough of Rochdale and the Local Government Districts of Sutton-in-Ashfield and West Ham.
	Ashton-in-Makerfield Order 1883	
	Ashton-under-Lyne, Dukinfield and Hurst Order 1883	
	Burnley Order 1883	
	Doncaster Order 1883	
	Hove Order 1883	
	Hucknall-under-Huthwaite Order 1883	
	Llandudno Order 1883	
	Middlesbrough Order 1883	
	Newport (Monmouthshire) Order 1883	
	Rochdale Order 1883	
	Sutton-in-Ashfield Order 1883	
	West Ham Order 1883	
Local Government Board's Provisional Orders Confirmation (No. 7) Act 1883	46 & 47 Vict. c. cxxxvii	2 August 1883
An Act to confirm certain Provisional Orders of the Local Government Board relating to the Local Government District of Bognor, the Borough of Cheltenham, the Improvement Act District of Chiswick, the Borough of Plymouth, the Local Government District of Skipton, the Borough of Stockton and the Local Government District of South Stockton, and the Local Government Districts of Stroud and Wallasey.
	Bognor Order 1883	
	Cheltenham Order 1883	
	Chiswick Order 1883	
	Plymouth Order 1883	
	Skipton Order 1883	
	Stockton Order 1883	
	Stroud Order 1883	
	Wallasey Order 1883	
Local Government Board's Provisional Orders Confirmation (Poor Law) (No. 2) Act 1883	46 & 47 Vict. c. cxxxviii	2 August 1883
An Act to confirm certain Orders of the Local Government Board under the provisions of the Divided Parishes and Poor Law Amendment Act, 1876, as amended and extended by the Poor Law Act, 1879, relating to the Parishes of Black-Torrington, Bradford, Bridgerule-East, Carhampton, Dodington, Fulwood, High-Hampton, Hinders-Lane-and-Dockham, Holford, Monksilver, Old-Cleve, Pancrasweek, Pleasley, Porlock, Pyworthy, Selworthy, Stogumber, Sutcombe, Upper-Langwith, and Withycombe; to the Townships of East-Dean, Hucknall-under-Huthwaite, and Sutton-in-Ashfield; and to the Tything of Lea-Bailey
	Black-Torrington and Bradford (Devon and Cornwall) Order 1883	
	Bridgerule-East and Pyworthy (Devon and Cornwall) Order 1883	
	Black-Torrington and High-Hampton (Devon and Cornwall) Order 1883	
	Pancrasweek and Sutcombe (Devon and Cornwall) Order 1883	
	Fulwood, Pleasley, and Upper-Langwith, and Townships of Hucknall-under-Huthwaite and Sutton-in-Ashfield (Nottinghamshire and Derbyshire) Order 1883	
	Hinders-Lane-and-Dockham, Township of East Dean and Tything of Lea-Bailey (Hereford and Gloucestershire) Order 1883	
	Carhampton and Withycombe (Somerset) Order 1883	
	Holford and Dodington (Somerset) Order 1883	
	Monksilver and Old-Cleve (Somerset) Order 1883	
	Monksilver and Stogumber (Somerset) Order 1883	
	Porlock and Selworthy (Somerset) Order 1883	
Plymouth and Dartmoor Railway Act 1883	46 & 47 Vict. c. cxxxix	2 August 1883
An Act for conferring further powers on the Plymouth and Dartmoor Railway Company for the construction of Works the raising of Money and otherwise in relation to their Undertaking and for providing for the distribution of the proceeds of the sale of a portion of the Undertaking of the Company and for other purposes.
Coventry and District Tramways Act 1883 (repealed)	46 & 47 Vict. c. cxl	2 August 1883
An Act to extend the time for constructing the Coventry and District Tramways and to empower the Coventry and District Tramways Company to raise additional Capital. (Repealed by West Midlands County Council Act 1980 (c. xi))
Gateshead and District Tramways Act 1883	46 & 47 Vict. c. cxli	2 August 1883
An Act to extend the time for constructing the Gateshead and District Tramways and to empower the Gateshead and District Tramways Company to raise additional Capital.
North London Tramways Act 1883	46 & 47 Vict. c. cxlii	2 August 1883
An Act for authorising the North London Tramways Company to abandon the Construction of a portion of their Authorised Undertaking and to use Steam or Mechanical Power for working their Tramways.
Hull, Barnsley and West Riding Junction Railway and Dock (Various Powers) Act 1883	46 & 47 Vict. c. cxliii	2 August 1883
An Act to authorise the Hull Barnsley and West Riding Junction Railway and Dock Company to construct New Railways and other Works to amend the Acts relating to the Company and for other purposes.
Hartlepool Borough Extension Act 1883 (repealed)	46 & 47 Vict. c. cxliv	2 August 1883
An Act for extending the Boundaries of the Borough of Hartlepool and for other purposes. (Repealed by County of Cleveland Act 1987 (c. ix) (Note: Incorrectly cited as "County of Cleveland 1987 (c.cix)" in the Chronological Table of Local Acts.))
London and North Western Railway (Additional Powers) Act 1883	46 & 47 Vict. c. cxlv	2 August 1883
An Act for conferring further Powers upon the London and North-western Railway Company in connexion with their own undertaking and upon that Company and the Lancashire and Yorkshire Railway Company in respect of their North Union Railway and upon the Lancashire Union Railways Company in respect of their Undertaking and for other purposes.
Rhondda and Swansea Bay Railway (Swansea Extension) Act 1883	46 & 47 Vict. c. cxlvi	2 August 1883
An Act for authorising the Rhondda and Swansea Bay Railway Company to extend their Railway to Swansea and for other purposes.
South West Suburban Water Act 1883	46 & 47 Vict. c. cxlvii	2 August 1883
An Act to amalgamate the Undertakings of the Norwood (Middlesex) and Sunningdale District Water Companies; and for other purposes.
Dumbarton Waterworks, Streets and Buildings Act 1883	46 & 47 Vict. c. cxlviii	2 August 1883
An Act for authorising the Dumbarton Water Commissioners to make and maintain additional Waterworks; for regulating the Streets and Buildings within the Burgh of Dumbarton; and for other purposes.
Stoke-upon-Trent and Fenton Gas Act 1883	46 & 47 Vict. c. cxlix	2 August 1883
An Act to dissolve the Stoke-upon-Trent and Fenton Joint Gas Committee and for other purposes.
Ramsey and Somersham Junction Railway Act 1883	46 & 47 Vict. c. cl	2 August 1883
An Act to extend the time limited for the compulsory purchase of lands and houses and completion of the railway and works authorised by the Ramsey and Somersham Junction Railway Act 1875 (Note: Ramsey and Somersham Junction Railway Act 1875 (38 & 39 Vict. c. ccxii)) and for other purposes.
Lydd Railway (Extension) Act 1883	46 & 47 Vict. c. cli	2 August 1883
An Act to authorise the Lydd Railway Company to make a Railway from Loose to Headcom in the County of Kent to raise further money and for other purposes.
Cork and Kenmore Railway Act 1883 (repealed)	46 & 47 Vict. c. clii	2 August 1883
An Act to authorise the Cork and Kenmare Railway Company to construct Railways in substitution for portions of those authorised by the Cork and Kenmare Railway Act 1881 (Note: Cork and Kenmare Railway Act 1881 (44 & 45 Vict. c. cxciv)) to abandon so much of the Railways authorised by that Act as will be rendered unnecessary by reason of the construction of the substituted Railways to alter certain provisions of the said Act as to Borrowing powers and Baronial Guarantee and for other purposes. (Repealed by Kenmare Junction Railway (Abandonment) Act 1890 (53 & 54 Vict. c. xlviii))
Ballina and Killala Railway and Harbour Act 1883 (repealed)	46 & 47 Vict. c. cliii	2 August 1883
An Act for making a Railway from Ballina to Killala and a Harbour at Killala in the County of Mayo and for other purposes. (Repealed by Ballina and Killala Railway and Harbour (Abandonment) Act 1889 (52 & 53 Vict. c. v))
Banbury and Cheltenham Direct Railway Act 1883	46 & 47 Vict. c. cliv	2 August 1883
An Act to confer further powers on the Banbuiy and Cheltenham Direct Railway Company for the construction of Works and the raising of money; and for other purposes.
Central Wales and Carmarthen Junction Railway Act 1883	46 & 47 Vict. c. clv	2 August 1883
An Act to grant traffic facilities to the Central Wales and Carmarthen Junction Railway Company.
Clyde Navigation Act 1883	46 & 47 Vict. c. clvi	2 August 1883
An Act to authorise the Trustees of the Clyde Navigation to construct Docks, Quays, Roads, Tramways, a Railway, and other Works at and connected with the Harbour of Glasgow and the River Clyde, and to borrow Money; and for other purposes.
Manchester, Sheffield and Lincolnshire Railway (Additional Powers) Act 1883	46 & 47 Vict. c. clvii	2 August 1883
An Act to authorise the Manchester Sheffield and Lincolnshire Railway Company to construct new Railways and other works and to confer further powers upon that Company in connexion with their undertaking and for other purposes.
Paddington Market Act 1883 (repealed)	46 & 47 Vict. c. clviii	2 August 1883
An Act for the Establishment and Regulation of a Market to be called Paddington Market in the parish of St. Mary Paddington in the County of Middlesex and for other purposes. (Repealed by Statute Law (Repeals) Act 2013 (c. 2))
Borough of Portsmouth Waterworks Act 1883	46 & 47 Vict. c. clix	2 August 1883
An Act to confer further powers upon the Borough of Portsmouth Waterworks Company for the construction of works and the raising of money to extend their limits for the supply of Water and for other purposes.
Southsea Railway Act 1883	46 & 47 Vict. c. clx	2 August 1883
An Act to confer further powers on the Southsea Railway Company for the construction of new and the completion of their authorised Railways and to confirm an Agreement between that Company and the London and South Western Railway Company; To provide for the abandonment of certain Roads authorised by the London Brighton and South Coast Railway (Various Powers) Act 1882; (Note: London, Brighton and South Coast Railway (Various Powers) Act 1882 (45 & 46 Vict. c. xciii)) and for other purposes.
Taff Vale Railway Act 1883	46 & 47 Vict. c. clxi	2 August 1883
An Act to empower the Taff Vale Railway Company to construct a new Railway at Merthyr and to acquire additional Lands and to raise further Capital and for other purposes.
Limerick Waterworks Act 1883	46 & 47 Vict. c. clxii	2 August 1883
An Act to enable the Limerick Waterworks Company to construct additional Works and to raise additional Capital and for other purposes.
Newborough Drainage Act 1883	46 & 47 Vict. c. clxiii	2 August 1883
An Act for incorporating the Newborough Drainage Commissioners and for conferring on them Powers for the Purchase of Land for Drainage Works and for the Borrowing of Money and for Amending the Newborough Drainage Acts and for other purposes.
Regent's Canal City and Docks Railway (Canal Capital) Act 1883 (repealed)	46 & 47 Vict. c. clxiv	2 August 1883
An Act for constituting a separate Canal Undertaking and Capital of the Regents Canal City and Docks Railway Company; and for other purposes. (Repealed by Grand Union Canal Act 1943 (6 & 7 Geo. 6. c. v))
Landport Wharf Act 1883	46 & 47 Vict. c. clxv	2 August 1883
An Act for empowering the Mayor Aldermen and Burgesses of the Borough of Portsmouth to construct a Wharf and other Works at Landport in the Borough of Portsmouth in the county of Southampton and for other purposes.
East and West Yorkshire Union Railways Act 1883	46 & 47 Vict. c. clxvi	2 August 1883
An Act for incorporating the East and West Yorkshire Union Railways Company and for other purposes.
South London Tramways Act 1883	46 & 47 Vict. c. clxvii	2 August 1883
An Act to confer further powers upon the South London Tramways Company and for other purposes.
Hastings and St. Leonards Gas Act 1883	46 & 47 Vict. c. clxviii	2 August 1883
An Act to authorise the Hastings and Saint Leonards Gas Company to raise further Capital and for other purposes.
Lancashire and Yorkshire Railway Act 1883	46 & 47 Vict. c. clxix	2 August 1883
An Act for conferring further Powers with relation to the Lancashire and Yorkshire Railway and the Preston and Wyre Railway and for other purposes.
Market Deeping Railway (Abandonment) Act 1883 (repealed)	46 & 47 Vict. c. clxx	2 August 1883
An Act for the Abandonment of the Market Deeping Railway. (Repealed by Statute Law (Repeals) Act 2013 (c. 2))
Cork Harbour Act 1883	46 & 47 Vict. c. clxxi	2 August 1883
An Act to amend the Powers of the Cork Harbour Commissioners with respect to Rates and Dues and for other purposes.
Ipswich Gas Act 1883	46 & 47 Vict. c. clxxii	2 August 1883
An Act for the granting of Further Powers to the Ipswich Gaslight Company.
Sock Dennis Rectory Act 1883	46 & 47 Vict. c. clxxiii	2 August 1883
An Act for suppressing the sinecure Rectory of Sock Dennis in the County of Somerset and providing for the application of the Tithe Rent-charge thereof.
Croydon and Norwood Tramways Act 1883	46 & 47 Vict. c. clxxiv	2 August 1883
An Act to amalgamate the Undertakings of the Croydon Tramways Company and the Norwood District Tramways Company, and to authorise the construction of new Tramways in and near Croydon and Norwood, in the county of Surrey; and for other purposes.
Great Northern Railway Act 1883	46 & 47 Vict. c. clxxv	2 August 1883
An Act to confer further Powers upon the Great Northern Railway Company with respect to their own and other Undertakings to enable them to acquire the Undertaking of the Hatfield and St. Albans Railway Company and for other purposes.
Lambourn Valley Railway Act 1883	46 & 47 Vict. c. clxxvi	2 August 1883
An Act for making a Railway to be called "The Lambourn Valley Railway," and for other purposes.
Metropolitan Board of Works (Bridges, &c.) Act 1883	46 & 47 Vict. c. clxxvii	2 August 1883
An Act for enabling the Metropolitan Board of Works to alter and re-construct Hammersmith Bridge; for providing for the free use by the Public of the East and West Ferry Roads in the Parish of Poplar in the County of Middlesex; and for other purposes.
Metropolitan Street Improvements Act 1883	46 & 47 Vict. c. clxxviii	2 August 1883
An Act for enabling the Metropolitan Board of Works to make certain New Streets and Street Improvements in the Metropolis and for other purposes.
Newport Dock (Transfer) Act 1883	46 & 47 Vict. c. clxxix	2 August 1883
An Act for the transfer of the Newport Dock Company's Undertaking to the Alexandra (Newport and South Wales) Docks and Railway Company and to empower that Company to make a New Lock and other works and for other purposes.
Pontypridd, Caerphilly and Newport Railway Act 1883	46 & 47 Vict. c. clxxx	2 August 1883
An Act to authorise the Pontypridd Caerphilly and Newport Railway Company to construct a Railway in the County of Monmouth and for other purposes.
Hawarden and District Waterworks Act 1883	46 & 47 Vict. c. clxxxi	2 August 1883
An Act for incorporating the Hawarden and District Waterworks Company and for conferring Powers on that Company; and for other purposes.
Staines and West Drayton Railway Act 1883	46 & 47 Vict. c. clxxxii	2 August 1883
An Act to authorise the Staines and West Drayton Railway Company to divert a portion of their authorised Railway near Staines, and to extend the same into the Town of Staines; and for other purposes.
Skegness Chapel St. Leonards and Alford Tramways Act 1883	46 & 47 Vict. c. clxxxiii	2 August 1883
An Act for incorporating the Skegness Chapel St. Leonards and Alford Tramways Company and authorising them to construct a Tramway from Skegness to Bilsby in the parts of Lindsey in the County of Lincoln and for other purposes.
Mersey (Gunpowder) Act 1883	46 & 47 Vict. c. clxxxiv	20 August 1883
An Act to transfer to one of Her Majesty's Principal Secretaries of State the powers vested in the Admiralty and the Board of Ordnance in relation to gunpowder magazines and stores in the River Mersey, and amend the Acts relating to those magazines and stores.
Haddan's Patent Act 1883	46 & 47 Vict. c. clxxxv	20 August 1883
An Act for rendering valid certain Letters Patent granted to Herbert John Haddan for Improvements in Electric Lamps.
Bexley Heath Railway Act 1883	46 & 47 Vict. c. clxxxvi	20 August 1883
An Act for authorising the construction of a railway in the County of Kent to be called the Bexley Heath Railway and for other purposes.
Borough of Portsmouth Kingston Fratton and Southsea Tramways Act 1883 or the Borough of Portsmouth, Kingston, Fratton and Southsea Railways Act 1883	46 & 47 Vict. c. clxxxvii	20 August 1883
An Act for incorporating the Borough of Portsmouth Kingston Fratton and Southsea Tramways Company; and for empowering them to construct Tramways; and for other purposes.
South-western (Bournemouth, &c.) Act 1883	46 & 47 Vict. c. clxxxviii	20 August 1883
An Act for authorising the London and South-western Railway Company to construct new Railways in the Counties of Southampton and Dorset and to widen part of their Ringwood Christchurch and Bournemouth Railway and jointly with the Midland Railway Company to construct a new Railway in the County of Dorset; and for other purposes.
South Western Railway (Various Powers) Act 1883	46 & 47 Vict. c. clxxxix	20 August 1883
An Act for authorising the London and South-western Railway Company to make new railways and deviations and widenings of railways and other works and to purchase additional lands and for conferring other powers upon them in relation to their own and other undertakings; for empowering the Company and the London Brighton and South Coast Railway Company to construct a railway and to acquire lands and to exercise other powers; for the sale or amalgamation to or with the undertaking of the Company of the Salisbury and Dorset Junction Railway; to empower the Company to construct certain railways of the North Cornwall Railway Company and to appoint a director of and take and hold part of the capital of that Company; for the sale or lease to the Company and the London Brighton and South Coast Railway Company of the Southsea Railway; for authorising and varying or annulling agreements between the Company and other Corporations bodies Companies and persons; and for other purposes.
Mersey Railway Act 1883	46 & 47 Vict. c. cxc	20 August 1883
An Act to authorise the Mersey Railway Company to raise additional capital and for other purposes.
Metropolitan Board of Works (District Railway Ventilators) Act 1883	46 & 47 Vict. c. cxci	20 August 1883
An Act to amend the Metropolitan District Railway Act 1881; (Note: Metropolitan District Railway Act 1881 (44 & 45 Vict. c. lxxxvi)) and for other purposes in relation thereto.
Windsor and Eton Waterworks Act 1883	46 & 47 Vict. c. cxcii	20 August 1883
An Act for incorporating the Windsor and Eton Waterworks Company and for vesting in them the Windsor and Eton Waterworks and for other purposes.
Great Western Railway Act 1883	46 & 47 Vict. c. cxciii	20 August 1883
An Act to authorise the Great Western Railway Company to make and maintain certain Railways and Works; For vesting in the Great Western Railway Company the Undertakings of the Stratford-upon-Avon Railway Company and the Watlington and Princes Risborough Railway Company; For confirming Agreements between the Great Western Railway Company and other Companies; and for other purposes.
Barrmill and Kilwinning Railway Act 1883	46 & 47 Vict. c. cxciv	20 August 1883
An Act for making a Railway from Barrmill to Kilwinning and for other purposes.
King's Lynn Graving Dock Act 1883	46 & 47 Vict. c. cxcv	20 August 1883
An Act to authorise the Construction and Maintenance of a Graving Dock, and other Works in connexion therewith, at King's Lynn, in the County of Norfolk.
Freshwater, Yarmouth and Newport Railway Act 1883	46 & 47 Vict. c. cxcvi	20 August 1883
An Act to extend the time for the completion of the Freshwater Yarmouth and Newport Railway and for the purchase of land therefor; to authorise the Freshwater Yarmouth and Newport Railway Company to raise additional capital and for other purposes.
Ogmore Dock and Railway Act 1883 (repealed)	46 & 47 Vict. c. cxcvii	20 August 1883
An Act to authorise the construction and maintenance of a Dock at the mouth of the River Ogmore and of a railway aqueduct and other works in connexion therewith in the County of Glamorgan and for other purposes. (Repealed by Ogmore Dock and Railway (Abandonment) Act 1891 (54 & 55 Vict. c. xvii))
South Hayling Bridge Act 1883	46 & 47 Vict. c. cxcviii	20 August 1883
An Act for incorporating the South Hayling Bridge Company and for empowering them to construct a Bridge over the Langstone Charnel between Hayling Island and Southsea with approach roads thereto in the County of Southampton and for other purposes.
Eastern and Midlands Railway Act 1883	46 & 47 Vict. c. cxcix	20 August 1883
An Act to authorise the Eastern and Midlands Railway Company to construct new Works and for other purposes.
Barnet District Gas and Water Act 1883 (repealed)	46 & 47 Vict. c. cc	20 August 1883
An Act to enable the Barnet District Gas and Water Company to extend their limits of Water Supply; to construct new Waterworks; to extend their Gas Works; and to raise additional Capital; and for other purposes. (Repealed by Lee Valley Water Act 1959 (7 & 8 Eliz. 2. c. li))
Brighton Marine Kursaal Act 1883	46 & 47 Vict. c. cci	20 August 1883
An Act to incorporate a Company for making a Pier Head and other works in connexion therewith at the seaward end of the Chain Pier Brighton in the county of Sussex; to enable the Company to hold shares in the Chain Pier Company; to acquire the undertaking of the Chain Pier Company; and for other purposes.
Holsworthy and Bude Railway Act 1883 (repealed)	46 & 47 Vict. c. ccii	20 August 1883
An Act for incorporating the Holsworthy and Bude Railway Company, and authorising them to make and maintain the Holsworthy and Bude Railway, and for other purposes. (Repealed by Holsworthy and Bude Railway Abandonment Act 1892 (55 & 56 Vict. c. xx))
Brentford and Isleworth Tramways and New Roads Act 1883	46 & 47 Vict. c. cciii	20 August 1883
An Act for empowering the Brentford and Isleworth Tramways Company to construct new Tramways and Roads in the County of Middlesex, to extend the time for making and completing the Tramways authorised by the Brentford and Isleworth Tramways Extension Act, 1880, (Note: Brentford and Isleworth Tramways Act 1880 (43 & 44 Vict. c. cxcvi)) and for other purposes.
London Tilbury and Southend Railway Act 1883	46 & 47 Vict. c. cciv	20 August 1883
An Act to enable the London Tilbury and Southend Railway Company to construct new Railways and for other purposes.
Exeter, Teign Valley and Chagford Railway Act 1883	46 & 47 Vict. c. ccv	20 August 1883
An Act for authorising the Construction of Railways to connect the Teign Valley Railway and the town of Chagford with Exeter; and for other purposes.
London, Hendon and Harrow Railway Act 1883 (repealed)	46 & 47 Vict. c. ccvi	20 August 1883
An Act for authorising the construction of a Railway from Hornsey to Hendon and Harrow, to be called the London Hendon and Harrow Railway; and for other purposes. (Repealed by London, Hendon and Harrow Railway (Abandonment) Act 1887 (50 & 51 Vict. c. xxxvii))
Metropolitan District Railway Act 1883	46 & 47 Vict. c. ccvii	20 August 1883
An Act to confer further Powers on the Metropolitan District Railway Company.
Metropolitan Outer Circle Railway Act 1883 (repealed)	46 & 47 Vict. c. ccviii	20 August 1883
An Act for granting further Powers to the Metropolitan Outer Circle Railway Company, and for other purposes. (Repealed by Metropolitan Outer Circle Railway (Abandonment) Act 1885 (48 & 49 Vict. c. clxiii))
Midland and Central Wales Junction Railway Act 1883 (repealed)	46 & 47 Vict. c. ccix	20 August 1883
An Act to authorise the construction of Railways in Shropshire and Staffordshire and for facilitating communication between the Midland Counties of England and Milford Haven and Swansea respectively. (Repealed by Midland and Central Wales Junction Railway (Abandonment) Act 1886 (50 Vict. c. li))
Oxford, Aylesbury and Metropolitan Junction Railway Act 1883	46 & 47 Vict. c. ccx	20 August 1883
An Act to authorise the Construction of a Railway from Oxford to Aylesbury and for other purposes.
Portsmouth Corporation Act 1883	46 & 47 Vict. c. ccxi	20 August 1883
An Act for making further provision respecting the borrowing of Money by the Corporation of Portsmouth; and for other purposes.
Regent's Canal, City and Docks Railway (Various Powers) Act 1883	46 & 47 Vict. c. ccxii	20 August 1883
An Act for constituting a separate Undertaking of the Regents Canal City and Docks Railway Company, for amending their Act (Note: Regent's Canal, City, and Docks Railway Act 1882 (45 & 46 Vict. c. cclxii)) of incorporation; and for other purposes.
Electric Lighting Orders Confirmation (No. 1) Act 1883	46 & 47 Vict. c. ccxiii	25 August 1883
An Act for confirming certain Provisional Orders made by the Board of Trade under the Electric Lighting Act, 1882, (Note: Electric Lighting Act 1882 (45 & 46 Vict. c. 56)) relating to Cambridge, Canterbury, Chelsea, Finchley, Folkestone, Gravesend, Greenock, Greenwich, High Wycombe, Ipswich, Maidstone, and Sunderland.
	Cambridge Electric Lighting Order 1883	
	Canterbury Electric Lighting Order 1883	
	Chelsea Electric Lighting Order 1883	
	Finchley Electric Lighting Order 1883	
	Folkestone Electric Lighting Order 1883	
	Gravesend Electric Lighting Order 1883	
	Greenock Electric Lighting Order 1883	
	Greenwich Electric Lighting Order 1883	
	High Wycombe Electric Lighting Order 1883	
	Ipswich Electric Lighting Order 1883	
	Maidstone Electric Lighting Order 1883	
	Sunderland Electric Lighting Order 1883	
Electric Lighting Orders Confirmation (No. 2) Act 1883	46 & 47 Vict. c. ccxiv	25 August 1883
An Act for confirming certain Provisional Orders made by the Board of Trade under the Electric Lighting Act, 1882, relating to Aston, Birkdale Dudley, Saltley, Ulverston, West Bromwich, and Wolverhampton.
	Aston Manor Electric Lighting Order 1883	
	Birkdale Electric Lighting Order 1883	
	Dudley Electric Lighting Order 1883	
	Saltley Electric Lighting Order 1883	
	Ulverston Electric Lighting Order 1883	
	West Bromwich Electric Lighting Order 1883	
	Wolverhampton Electric Lighting Order 1883	
Electric Lighting Orders Confirmation (No. 3) Act 1883	46 & 47 Vict. c. ccxv	25 August 1883
An Act for confirming certain Provisional Orders made by the Board of Trade under the Electric Lighting Act, 1882, relating to Balsall Heath, Birmingham, Redditch, and Walsall.
	Balsall Heath Electric Lighting Order 1883	
	Birmingham Electric Lighting Order 1883	
	Redditch Electric Lighting Order 1883	
	Walsall Electric Lighting Order 1883	
Electric Lighting Orders Confirmation (No. 4) Act 1883	46 & 47 Vict. c. ccxvi	25 August 1883
An Act for confirming certain Provisional Orders made by the Board of Trade under the Electric Lighting Act, 1882, relating to Barton Eccles Winton and Monton, Carlisle, Croydon, Luton, Margate, Nelson, Rochester Scarborough, and Sudbury.
	Barton, Eccles, Winton and Monton Local Board Electric Lighting Order 1883	
	Carlisle Electric Lighting Order 1883	
	Croydon Electric Lighting Order 1883	
	Luton Electric Lighting Order 1883	
	Margate Electric Lighting Order 1883	
	Nelson Electric Lighting Order 1883	
	Rochester Electric Lighting Order 1883	
	Scarborough Electric Lighting Order 1883	
Electric Lighting Orders Confirmation (No. 5) Act 1883	46 & 47 Vict. c. ccxvii	25 August 1883
An Act for confirming certain Provisional Orders made by the Board of Trade under the Electric Lighting Act, 1882, relating to Bermondsey, Clerkenwell, Hampstead, Holborn, Hornsey, St. George’s-in-the-East, St. Giles (Brush), St. James' and St. Martin's, St. Luke's, and Wandsworth.
	Bermondsey Electric Lighting Order 1883	
	Clerkenwell Electric Lighting Order 1883	
	Hampstead Electric Lighting Order 1883	
	Holborn Electric Lighting Order 1883	
	Hornsey Electric Lighting Order 1883	
	St. George's-in-the-East Electric Lighting Order 1883	
	St. Giles (Brush) Electric Lighting Order 1883	
	St. James' and St. Martin's (London) Electric Lighting Order 1883	
	St. Luke's Electric Lighting Order 1883	
	Wandsworth Electric Lighting Order 1883	
Electric Lighting Orders Confirmation (No. 6) Act 1883	46 & 47 Vict. c. ccxviii	25 August 1883
An Act for confirming certain Provisional Orders made by the Board of Trade under the Electric Lighting Act, 1882, relating to Limehouse, Poplar, Richmond (Surrey), Rotherhithe, St. Giles’s (Pilsen Joel), St. Olave, St. Saviour's (Southwark), Shoreditch, and Wednesbury and Darlaston.
	Limehouse Electric Lighting Order 1883 Provisional Order authorising the Metropolitan (Brush) Electric Light and Power Company, Limited, to erect and maintain Electric Lines and Works, and to supply Electricity within the district of the Limehouse Board of Works, in the County of Middlesex.	
	Poplar Electric Lighting Order 1883 Provisional Order authorising the Metropolitan (Brush) Electric Light and Power Company, Limited, to erect and maintain Electric Lines and Works, and to supply Electricity, within the district of the Poplar Board of Works, in the County of Middlesex.	
	Richmond (Surrey) Electric Lighting Order 1883 Provisional Order authorising the Vestry of the Parish of Richmond, in the County of Surrey, to erect and maintain Electric Lines and Works, and to supply Electricity within the Parish of Richmond, in the County of Surrey.	
	Rotherhithe Electric Lighting Order 1883 Provisional Order authorising the Metropolitan (Brush) Electric Light and Power Company, Limited, to erect and maintain Electric Lines and Works, and to supply Electricity within the Parish of Rotherhithe in the County of Surrey.	
	St. Giles (Pilsen Joel) Electric Lighting Order 1883 Provisional Order authorising the Pilsen, Joel, and General Electric Light Company, Limited, to erect and maintain Electric Lines and Works, and to supply Electricity within the district of the St. Giles Board of Works in the County of Middlesex.	
	St. Olave Electric Lighting Order 1883 Provisional Order authorising the Metropolitan (Brush) Electric Light and Power Company, Limited, to erect and maintain Electric Lines and Works, and to supply Electricity, within the District of the St. Olave Board of Works, in the County of Surrey.	
	St. Saviour's (Southwark) Electric Lighting Order 1883 Provisional Order authorising the Metropolitan (Brush) Electric Light and Power Company, Limited, to erect and maintain Electric Lines and Works, and to supply Electricity within the District of the St. Saviour's Board of Works in the County of Surrey.	
	Shoreditch Electric Lighting Order 1883 Provisional Order authorising the Metropolitan (Brush) Electric Light and Power Company, Limited, to erect and maintain Electric Lines and Works, and to supply Electricity within the Parish of St. Leonard Shoreditch, in the County of Middlesex.	
	Wednesbury and Darlaston Electric Lighting Order 1883 Provisional Order authorising the South Staffordshire Electric Lighting Company, Limited, to erect and maintain Electric Lines and Works, and to supply Electricity, within the Parishes of Wednesbury and Darlaston, in the County of Stafford.	
Electric Lighting Orders Confirmation (No. 7) Act 1883	46 & 47 Vict. c. ccxix	25 August 1883
An Act for confirming certain Provisional Orders made by the Board of Trade under the Electric Lighting Act, 1882, relating to Barnes and Mortlake, Hackney, Islington, St. Pancras (Middlesex), and Whitechapel.
	Barnes and Mortlake Electric Lighting Order 1883 Provisional Order authorising the Metropolitan (Brush) Electric Light and Power Company, Limited, to erect and maintain Electric Lines and Works, and to supply Electricity, within the Parishes of Barnes and Mortlake, in the County of Surrey.	
	Hackney Electric Lighting Order 1883 Provisional Order authorising the Metropolitan (Brush) Electric Light and Power Company, Limited, to erect and maintain Electric Lines and Works, and to supply Electricity, within the district of the Hackney Board of Works, in the County of Middlesex.	
	Islington Electric Lighting Order 1883 Provisional Order authorising the Metropolitan (Brush) Electric Light and Power Company, Limited, to erect and maintain Electric Lines and Works, and to supply Electricity, within the Parish of St. Mary, Islington, in the County of Middlesex.	
	St. Pancras (Middlesex) Electric Lighting Order 1883 Provisional Order authorising the Vestry of the Parish of St. Pancras, in the County of Middlesex, to erect and maintain Electric Lines and Works, and to supply Electricity within the Parish of St. Pancras, in the County of Middlesex.	
	Whitechapel Electric Lighting Order 1883 Provisional Order authorising the Metropolitan (Brush) Electric Light and Power Company, Limited, to erect and maintain Electric Lines and Works, and to supply Electricity, within the District of the Whitechapel Board of Works, in the County of Middlesex.	
Electric Lighting Orders Confirmation (No. 8) Act 1883	46 & 47 Vict. c. ccxx	25 August 1883
An Act for confirming certain Provisional Orders made by the Board of Trade under the Electric Lighting Act, 1882, relating to Bradford, Brighton, Hanover Square District (London), Norwich, South Kensington District (London), Strand District (London), and Victoria District (London).
	Bradford Electric Lighting Order 1883 Provisional Order authorising the Mayor, Aldermen, and Burgesses of the Borough of Bradford to erect and maintain Electric Lines and Works, and to supply Electricity, within the Borough of Bradford, in the County of York.	
	Brighton Electric Lighting Order 1883 Provisional Order authorising the Mayor, Aldermen, and Burgesses of the Borough of Brighton to erect and maintain Electric Lines and Works, and to supply Electricity, within the Borough of Brighton, in the County of Sussex.	
	Hanover Square District (London) Electric Lighting Order 1883 Provisional Order authorising the Swan United Electric Light Company, Limited, to erect and maintain Electric Lines and Works, and to supply Electricity, within the Parish of St. George, Hanover Square, in the County of Middlesex, or in the City of Westminster, or in the liberty of the City of Westminster.	
	Norwich Electric Lighting Order 1883 Provisional Order authorising the Mayor, Aldermen, and Citizens of the City of Norwich to erect and maintain Electric Lines and Works, and to supply Electricity, within the City of Norwich, and the County of the said City.	
	South Kensington Electric Lighting Order 1883 Provisional Order authorising the Swan United Electric Light Company, Limited, to erect and maintain Electric Lines and Works, and to supply Electricity, within the Parishes of St. Mary Abbott, Kensington, in the County of Middlesex.	
	Strand District (London) Electric Lighting Order 1883 Provisional Order authorising the Swan United Electric Light Company, Limited, to erect and maintain Electric Lines and Works, and to supply Electricity within the Parishes of Saint Giles in the Fields, St. Mary le Strand, St. Clements Danes, and Saint Andrew, Holborn, and within the liberty of the Rolls, and the precincts of the Savoy in the County of Middlesex.	
	Victoria District (London) Electric Lighting Order 1883 Provisional Order authorising the Swan United Electric Light Company, Limited, to erect and maintain Electric Lines and Works, and to supply Electricity within the Parish of St. George, Hanover Square, in the County of Middlesex, or in the City of Westminster.	
Electric Lighting Orders Confirmation (No. 9) Act 1883	46 & 47 Vict. c. ccxxi	25 August 1883
An Act for confirming certain Provisional Orders made by the Board of Trade under the Electric Lighting Act, 1882, relating to Bristol, Grantham, and Lowestoft.
	Bristol Electric Lighting Order 1883 Provisional Order authorising the Mayor, Aldermen, and Burgesses of the City of Bristol to erect and maintain Electric Lines and Works, and to supply Electricity, within the City and County of Bristol.	
	Grantham Electric Lighting Order 1883 Provisional Order authorising the Mayor, Aldermen, and Burgesses of the Borough of Grantham to erect and maintain Electric Lines and Works, and to supply Electricity within the Borough of Grantham, in the County of Lincoln.	
	Lowestoft Electric Lighting Order 1883 Provisional Order authorising the Provincial (Brush) Electric Light and Power Company, Limited, to erect and maintain Electric Lines and Works, and to supply Electricity, within the Parish of Lowestoft, in the County of Suffolk.	
Electric Lighting Orders Confirmation (No. 10) Act 1883	46 & 47 Vict. c. ccxxii	25 August 1883
An Act for confirming certain Provisional Orders made by the Board of Trade under the Electric Lighting Act, 1882, relating to Chiswick and St. George-the-Martyr, Southwark.
	Chiswick Electric Lighting Order 1883	
	St. George the Martyr, Southwark, Electric Lighting Order 1883	
Electric Lighting Orders Confirmation (No. 11) Act 1883 (repealed)	46 & 47 Vict. c. ccxxiii	25 August 1883
An Act for confirming a Provisional Order made by the Board of Trade under the Electric Lighting Act, 1882, relating to Dundee. (Repealed by North of Scotland Electricity Order Confirmation Act 1958 (7 & 8 Eliz. 2. c. ii))
	Dundee Electric Lighting Order 1883 Provisional Order authorising the Brush Electric Light and Power Company of Scotland, Limited, to erect and maintain Electric Lines and Works, and to supply Electricity within the Burgh of Dundee.	
Local Government Board's Provisional Order Confirmation (No. 2) Act 1883	46 & 47 Vict. c. ccxxiv	25 August 1883
An Act to confirm a Provisional Order of the Local Government Board relating to the Improvement Act District of West Hartlepool.
	West Hartlepool Order 1883 Provisional Order for partially repealing and altering The West Hartlepool Extension and Improvement Act, 1870, (Note: West Hartlepool Extension and Improvement Act 1870 (33 & 34 Vict. c. cxiii)) and for other purposes.	
Local Government Board's Provisional Orders Confirmation (No. 9) Act 1883	46 & 47 Vict. c. ccxxv	25 August 1883
An Act to confirm a Provisional Order of the Local Government Board relating to the Improvement Act District of West Hartlepool.
	Haslingden Order 1883 Provisional Order for extending the Local Government District of Haslingden, and for other purposes.	
	Ramsbottom Order 1883 Provisional Order for extending the Local Government District of Ramsbottom, and for other purposes.	
	Rawtenstall Order 1883 Provisional Order for extending the Local Government District of Rawtenstall, and for other purposes.	
Isle of Wight Highway Act 1883 (repealed)	46 & 47 Vict. c. ccxxvi	25 August 1883
An Act to amend the Law relating to Highways in the Isle of Wight, and for other purposes. (Repealed by Isle of Wight Highways Act 1925 (15 & 16 Geo. 5. c. xiii))
Peckham and East Dulwich Tramways (Extensions) Act 1883	46 & 47 Vict. c. ccxxvii	25 August 1883
An Act to authorise the Peckham and East Dulwich Tramways Company to construct new Tramways in the County of Surrey and for other purposes.
Stratford-upon-Avon, Towcester and Midland Junction Railway Act 1883	46 & 47 Vict. c. ccxxviii	25 August 1883
An Act to confer further powers on the Stratford-upon-Avon, Towcester and Midland Junction Railway Company in reference to their own Undertaking and the Undertaking of the East and West Junction Railway Company; and for other purposes.
Milford Docks Act 1883 (repealed)	46 & 47 Vict. c. ccxxix	25 August 1883
An Act to enable the Milford Docks Company to create an additional amount of Debenture Stock in Place of other Capital, to effect a settlement of the affairs of the Company, and for other purposes. (Repealed by Milford Docks Act 1953 (1 & 2 Eliz. 2. c. x))
Plymouth, Devonport and South Western Junction Railway Act 1883	46 & 47 Vict. c. ccxxx	25 August 1883
An Act for incorporating the Plymouth Devonport and South-Western Junction Railway Company and authorising them to make and maintain the Plymouth Devonport and South-Western Junction Railway and for authorising arrangements between them and the London and South-Western Railway Company and for other purposes.
Ennis and West Clare Railway (Abandonment) Act 1883	46 & 47 Vict. c. ccxxxi	25 August 1883
An Act for the Abandonment of the Ennis and West Clare Railway.
Dublin Southern District Tramways Act 1883	46 & 47 Vict. c. ccxxxii	25 August 1883
An Act to empower the Dublin Southern District Tramways Company to double certain of their existing Tramways; and for other purposes.

=== Private and personal acts ===
Short title	Citation	Royal assent
Long title
Penicuik Trust Estates Act 1883	46 & 47 Vict. c. 1 Pr.	18 June 1883
An Act to authorise the Trustees under the Settlement of Marriage between Sir George Douglas Clerk, of Penicuik, Bart., and Miss Aymée Elizabeth Georgina Napier, and the said Sir George Douglas Clerk, to sell lands; to pay debts; and for other purposes.
Sir Robert Peel's Estate Act 1883	46 & 47 Vict. c. 2 Pr.	29 June 1883
An Act to enable the Trustees of Sir Robert Peel's Settled Estates to raise money for payment of his debts, and for vesting in such Trustees his life interest in and certain of his powers over the Settled Estates, and for other purposes.
Earl of Aylesford's Estate (Amendment) Act 1883	46 & 47 Vict. c. 3 Pr.	2 August 1883
An Act to amend the Earl of Aylesford's Estate Act, 1882. (Note: Earl of Aylesford's Estate Act 1882 (45 & 46 Vict. c. 3 Pr.))
Guinness' Estate Act 1883	46 & 47 Vict. c. 4 Pr.	2 August 1883
An Act to enable Edward Cecil Guinness to sell and convey to the Commissioners of Public Works in Ireland, the fee simple of certain lands, situate in the Parish of St. Peter, in the City of Dublin, free from all incumbrances.
Harrison Estate Act 1883	46 & 47 Vict. c. 5 Pr.	20 August 1883
An Act to enable the Trustees of Captain John Harrison's Settled Estates to raise Money for Payment of Improvements made and to be made thereon and for Vesting in such Trustees his Life-interest in the Settled Estates and for other purposes in relation thereto.

=== Sources ===
- The Public General Statutes, Volume 19: 46 & 47 Victoria – 1883 – via Internet Archive.
- Journals of the House of Commons (PDF). Vol. 138 – via parliament.uk.

== See also ==
- List of acts of the Parliament of the United Kingdom
