= St. Pancras Power Stations =

Two former electricity generating stations

- Country: England, United Kingdom
- Location: St. Pancras, London
- Coordinates: 51°31′33″N 00°08′31″W
- Status: Decommissioned and demolished
- Construction began: 1890, 1893
- Commission date: November 1891, 1895
- Decommission date: 1925, 1968
- Owners: St. Pancras Vestry (1890–1900); Borough of St. Pancras (1900–1948); British Electricity Authority (1948–1955); Central Electricity Authority (1955–1957); Central Electricity Generating Board (1958–1968)
- Operator: As owners

Thermal power station
- Primary fuel: Coal
- Secondary fuel: Refuse, oil
- Chimneys: 1 (each station)
- Cooling towers: None
- Cooling source: Circulating water & canal water
- Annual revenue: see table in text

Power generation
- Make and model: Willans engines, Belliss engines, Kapp dynamos, Brush-Ljungstrom turbo-generators
- Units decommissioned: All
- Nameplate capacity: 49.1 MW maximum
- Annual net output: see table in text

The St. Pancras Power Stations were two electricity generating stations, also known as the Regent’s Park Power Station and the King’s Road Power Station, which supplied electricity to the district of St. Pancras in north London from 1891 to 1968.

== History ==
The Vestry of St. Pancras was the first London local authority to apply to provide an electricity supply. This was authorised by the St. Pancras (Middlesex) Electric Lighting Order 1883, confirmed by the Electric Lighting Orders Confirmation (No. 7) Act 1883 (46 & 47 Vict. c. ccxix), which allowed the vestry to generate and supply electricity to the district. However, no construction work was undertaken: but the authorisation prevented any competing company undertakings from supplying electricity to the area.

== Regent’s Park Power Station ==
Work started in 1890 to build a power station east of Regent's Park on a site bounded by Stanhope Street, Longford Street and Wybert Street (TQ 290 824). The site, which then comprised residential buildings, was purchased for £10,827. The power station was known both as St. Pancras Power Station and Regent’s Park Power Station. The engine room was 106 ft by 26 ft (32.3 m by 7.9 m), the boiler house was west of the engine room and included a 90 ft (27.4 m) high brick chimney 5 ft (1.5 m) square. The principal equipment comprised:

- five Babcock & Wilcox boilers producing 5,000 lb/hr (0.63 kg/s) of steam at 70 psi (4.83 bar),
- nine triple expansion Willans-Robinson engines coupled to Kapp dynamos delivering 680 Amps at 112–130 Volts,
- two Willans engines driving a pair of dynamos delivering 90 Amps at 540–575 Volts for arc lights,
- jet condensers and a 170,000 gallon (773 m^{3}) underground water tank,
- banks of batteries to equalise the voltage, the battery house was north east of the engine room.

The station started generating electricity in November 1891. It was designed to supply 10,000 incandescent lamps and 90 arc lights for street lighting, with a total capacity of about 1,000 kW. Within six months of opening the load on the station was at capacity. In 1893 the Vestry installed three further boilers and three 90 kW generators which completed the station.

In 1897 the plant generated 1847.18 MWh; 1342.54 MWh was sold to customers and 177.815 MWh for public, this provided an income to the corporation of £33,347-9-11. The growth of electricity supplies is illustrated in the table.

In 1899 two additional engines of 750 HP and associated generators were added and two more of similar size were on order.

Growth of electricity supplies
Year	Customers	Current sold to private consumers £ s. d.	No. of lamps and motors		
Year	Customers	Current sold to private consumers £ s. d.	Incandescent (16 candle power)	Arc	Motors
Regent’s park station
1893	238	£9,545 17 6	12,851	110	19
1894	349	£12,056 9 6	15,532	129	22
1895	447	£14,824 15 6	19,195	139	37
1896	530	£18,104 17 2	21,988	151	44
1897	615	£23,104 16 2	23,988	187	65
King’s Road station
1896	142	£3,824 6 3	4,912	36	3
1897	193	£6,197 5 3	8,262	69	13

In 1923 the DC generating plant was located at the Regent’s Park site and comprised 4 × 0.5 MW reciprocating generators providing a 220 / 440 DC supply. The boilers at Regent’s Park had a total evaporative capacity of 60,000 lb/hr (7.56 kg/s).

The power station at Stanhope Street operated for 34 years and was closed in 1925 and all electricity generation for the Borough was undertaken at King’s Road. The area has been extensively redeveloped and there is no material evidence of the Regent’s Park power station. Some original lamp posts are extant in Tottenham Court Road, fitted with modern lamps.

== King’s Road Power Station ==
The St. Pancras district extended over an area of 2,694 acres (1,090 ha). In 1893 the Vestry started construction of a second power station to provide electricity supplies to the north of the district. It was located on a site bounded by King’s Road, Pratt Street, Georgiana Street and Great College Street (TQ293839), when purchased the site was occupied by industrial buildings. The new station, also known as St. Pancras Power Station or King’s Road Power Station, was designed to burn domestic and commercial refuse as well as coal. It was commissioned in late 1895 and initially had:

- three ‘Lancashire’ type boilers with an evaporative capacity of 5,500 to 7,000 lb/hr (0.7–0.88 kg/s) and working at a pressure of 125 psi (8.6 bar),
- three Belliss engines developing 200 BHP (150 kW) at 350 RPM, each was connected to two 65 kW dynamos,
- provision for a further two engine/dynamo sets to be added.

Condensing of steam was done using water abstracted from the nearby Regent's Canal. There were operational problems with the refuse destructor which provided insufficient heat to raise steam in the quantities required. The destructor only handled a small proportion of the waste produced in the area and after several modifications the refuse facility was abolished in 1920, after which the boilers were coal fired.

In 1914 a Brush-Ljungstrom turbo-generator 1,500-kW set was installed being the first manufactured in this country. During 1919 and 1921 two more Ljungstrom turbines of 3,000 kilowatts were ordered from the Brush Electrical Engineering Co., Ltd. In October 1924 the first of two 7,000-kW sets was commissioned.

In 1923 the AC generating plant comprised 1 × 1.5 MW, 1 × 2 MW, 2 × 3 MW and 1 × 5.6 MW turbo-generators. The boilers at King’s Road had a total evaporative capacity of 185,000 lb/hr (23.31 kg/s). Then in 1927 a 12,500 kW Brush-Ljungstrom turbo-generator set was added giving at total capacity of 31,500 kW of the station.

In the early 1960s the plant at King’s Road comprised a mixture of chain grate stoker, pulverised coal, oil-fired plant and internal combustion engine prime movers. The boilers were capable of delivering 220,000 lb/hr (27.7 kg/s) of steam at 200 psi (13.8 bar) and 482/316/343 °C. The coal-fired plant was taken out of service, and during the final 3 years of operation only the oil-fired plant was used, but with a low load factor (see table).

The King’s Road power station was decommissioned in 1968 after a working life of 73 years. The site is now (2020) the St. Pancras Georgiana Street sub-station.

== Legislative impact ==
The London Government Act 1899 abolished the Vestry of St. Pancras and established St. Pancras Metropolitan Borough Council from November 1900. The Borough's Electricity and Public Lighting Committee assumed responsibility for the power stations and the electricity distribution system.

The Electricity (Supply) Act 1926 established Central Electricity Board (CEB) which was responsible for directing the operation of power stations including St. Pancras Power Stations. The CEB was also responsible for constructing the national grid which provided interconnections between electricity systems like St. Pancras, thereby enabled to import and export electricity in bulk. For example, from 1927 St. Pancras became an authorised distributor providing a supply in bulk to Islington Metropolitan Borough Council; in 1931 it supplied 38.509 MWh. It also supplied electricity to the County of London Electric Supply Company delivering 14 MWh in 1935 and 1936.

Upon nationalisation of the British electricity supply industry in 1948 under the Electricity Act 1947 the ownership of King’s Road Power Station was vested in the British Electricity Authority, and then to the Central Electricity Authority, and finally to the Central Electricity Generating Board. The low voltage distribution network and sales of electricity was the responsibility of the London Electricity Board which bought electricity in bulk from the British Electricity Authority, etc.

== Operational data ==
A summary of the operational data for the St. Pancras power stations and their associated electricity system over the working life is shown in the following table.

St. Pancras power stations, operational data 1891–1967
Year	Generating capacity, MW	Maximum load, MW	Electricity generated, GWh	Electricity sold, GWh	Notes
1891	1.00				10,000 incandescent lamps & 90 arc lights
1902/03		2.74		4.205	453 arc lights, 259 motors. 894.6 MWh used for public lighting, 3.31 GWh to private supply.
1903/04	6.39	3.19	5.613	4.731	461 arc lights, 312 motors. 909.4 MWh used for public lighting, 3.82 GWh to private supply.
1912/3	8.28	5.74	11.67	10.21	1,037 public lamps using 1.90 MW
1918/9	7.9	5.90	16.50	14.53	1,059 public lamps using 1.67 MW
1919/20	7.9	6.44	14.34	13.095	1,059 public lamps using 1.83 MW; 0.504 GWh purchased
1923/4	13.5	11.49	22.731	19.55	1,098 public lamps using 16.27 MW. 25.122 MW was for ‘other purposes’.
1933/4	?			57.96	
1936/7	?			72.24	
1938	49.0 AC + 0.066 DC	30.1	20.556	72.25	82.837 GWh purchased.
1946		19.97	22.33	19.97	
1954	47.6	—	9.196	—	Ran for 908 hours, thermal efficiency 10.88%, burned 11,300 tons of coal
1955	26			8.54	
1956	26			6.16	
1957	26			1.16	
1958	17			0.93	
1960/1	17		1.22		
1961	47.566	Schedule of power stations as at 31 December 1954	1.52	—	Thermal efficiency 7.6%
1961/2	47		2.68		
1962/3	47		7.38		
1963/4	47.566	—	3.28	—	Thermal efficiency 7.97%, load factor 2.2%
1964/5	47.566	—	4.81	—	Thermal efficiency 11.36%, load factor 3.2%
1965/6	47.566	—	10.95	—	Thermal efficiency 13.59%, load factor 7.4%
1966/7	47.566	—	5.31	—	Thermal efficiency 12.00%, load factor 3.6%

- There were two sub-stations on the St. Pancras system: at Tavistock Place and Highgate Road.
- The number of electricity customers in the Borough increased steadily. In 1903 there were 2,280, this increased to 5,034 in 1919, to 9,277 in 1924, and 44,161 in 1938.
- Until after 1920 St. Pancras power stations supplied only Direct Current to customers at 220 V and 440 V.
- In the year ending 31 March 1904 electricity was being sold to private consumers at 3.96 d./kWh and public lighting was charged at 2.44 d./kWh. In 1938 electricity for lighting was being charged at 2.75 d./kWh, at 0.5 d./kWh for heating and cooking, and 0.75 d./kWh for power.
- The Borough took a supply of electricity from the London, Midland and Scottish Railway Company at Kentish Town: 1.376 GWh in the year 1923/4 at a cost of £5,446; this arrangement continued into the 1930s.
- In 1922 a total of 13,558 MWh electricity was sold (16,218 MWh in 1923) this raised a total revenue of £241,623 in 1922 and £220,127 in 1923.
- The financial profits and losses from the supply of electricity in the Borough of St. Pancras were as follows.

St. Pancras electricity undertaking, annual profits
Year	1917/8	1918/9	1919/20	1921/2	1923/4	1927/8	1928/9	1931/2	1933/4	1934/5
Profit (loss) £	14,500	(20,000)	(13,781)	23,129	31,500	46,000	37,586	20,959	25,293	35,350

The income from the electricity undertaking enabled the Borough to reduce the rates (local taxes). For example, in 1921/2 from the profit of £23,129 made, £16,132 was transferred for the relief of local rates.

By the late 1950s the plant comprised one 15 MW, one 12.5 MW, two 7 MW and two 3 MW Brush-Ljungstrom turbo-alternators all generating at 5.2 kV.

== Culture ==
King’s Road power station was used as a set in the 1965 film Operation Crossbow where it represented a WW2 rocket factory.
