= Scarborough power station =

Former coal-fired power station

- Country: England
- Location: Scarborough Yorkshire
- Coordinates: 54°16′19″N 00°25′02″W
- Status: Decommissioned and demolished
- Construction began: 1891
- Commission date: 1893
- Decommission date: 1958
- Owners: Scarborough Electric Supply Company Limited (1893–1925); Scarborough Corporation (1926–1948); British Electricity Authority (1948–1955); Central Electricity Authority (1955–1957); Central Electricity Generating Board (1958)
- Operator: As owner

Thermal power station
- Primary fuel: Coal
- Turbine technology: Steam turbines

Power generation
- Units operational: see text
- Nameplate capacity: 7 MW (1958)
- Annual net output: 8,229 MWh (1946)

Scarborough power station supplied electricity to the town of Scarborough and the surrounding area from 1893 to 1958. It was owned and operated by the Scarborough Electric Supply Company Limited from 1893 to 1925, then by Scarborough Corporation until the nationalisation of the British electricity supply industry in 1948. The coal-fired power station had an ultimate electricity generating capacity of 7 MW prior to its closure in October 1958.

== History ==
Scarborough Corporation applied for a Provisional Order under the Electric Lighting Acts to generate and supply electricity to the town. The Scarborough Electric Lighting Order 1883 was granted by the Board of Trade and was confirmed by Parliament through the Electric Lighting Orders Confirmation (No. 4) Act 1883 (46 & 47 Vict. c. ccxvi). However, no construction was undertaken. The provisional order was transferred to the Scarborough Electric Supply Company Limited by the Scarborough Corporation Electric Lighting Order 1891 under the Electric Lighting Orders Confirmation (No. 5) Act 1891 (54 & 55 Vict. c. lxii). The company built the power station in Salisbury Street (54°16′19″N 0°25′02″W) which first supplied electricity in September 1893.

== Equipment specification ==
The original plant at Scarborough power station comprised Parsons turbines coupled to Parsons dynamos. In 1898 the generating capacity was 525 kW and the maximum load was 286 kW; there were 330 customers.

=== Plant in 1923-30 ===
By 1923 the generating plant comprised:

- Coal-fired boilers generating up to 33,000 lb/h (4.16 kg/s) of steam which supplied:
- Generators:
  - 1 × 75 kW steam turbo-alternator AC
  - 1 × 150 kW steam turbo-alternator AC
  - 2 × 500 kW steam turbo-alternators AC
  - 3 × 300 kW steam turbo-generator DC

These machines gave a total generating capacity of 1,225 kW of alternating current and 900 kW of direct current.

Electricity was supplied to consumers as:

- Single phase, 80 Hz AC at 200 Volts
- DC at 500 Volts

In 1927 a 1,875 kW turbo-generator was commissioned, and in 1929 and 1930 two 3,750 kW turbo-alternators were installed.

This gave a total generating capacity of 11,500 kW.

== Operations ==
In 1898 the maximum electricity demand was 286 kW.

=== Operating data 1921–23 ===
The operating data for the period 1921–23 was:

Scarborough power station operating data 1921–23
Electricity Use	Units	Year		
Electricity Use	Units	1921	1922	1923
Lighting and domestic use	MWh	702	895	1,035
Public lighting use	MWh	0	0	0
Traction	MWh	392	374	349
Power use	MWh	360	458	605
Total use	MWh	1,454	1,727	1,989
Load and connected load
Maximum load	kW	804	868	1,087
Total connections	kW	4,834	5,299	5,518
Load factor	Per cent	23.9	26.6	26.7
Financial
Revenue from sales of current	£	–	32,733	37,020
Surplus of revenue over expenses	£	–	5,143	14,900

In January 1926 the Scarborough Corporation took over the undertaking at a cost of £173,105.

Under the terms of the Electricity (Supply) Act 1926 (16 & 17 Geo. 5. c. 51) the Central Electricity Board (CEB) was established in 1926. The CEB identified high efficiency ‘selected’ power stations that would supply electricity most effectively. The CEB also constructed the National Grid (1927–33) to connect power stations within a region.

=== Operating data 1946–8 ===
Scarborough power station operating data in 1946–8 was:

Scarborough power station operating data, 1946–8
Year	Load factor per cent	Max output load MW	Electricity supplied MWh	Thermal efficiency per cent
1946	13.6	6,890	8,229	11.96
1948	–	10,270	34,000	–

The British electricity supply industry was nationalised in 1948 under the provisions of the Electricity Act 1947 (10 & 11 Geo. 6. c. 54). The Scarborough electricity undertaking was abolished, ownership of Scarborough power station was vested in the British Electricity Authority, and subsequently the Central Electricity Authority and the Central Electricity Generating Board (CEGB). At the same time the electricity distribution and sales responsibilities of the Scarborough electricity undertaking were transferred to the Yorkshire Electricity Board (YEB).

=== Operating data 1954–58 ===
Operating data for the period 1954–58 was:

Scarborough power station operating data, 1954–58
Year	Running hours	Max output capacity MW	Electricity supplied GWh	Thermal efficiency per cent
1954	2410	7	9.934	12.98
1955	2717	7	11.107	12.53
1956	2980	7	13.667	13.36
1957	2856	7	12.685	13.96
1958	1955	7	8.574	12.27

== Closure ==
Scarborough power station was decommissioned on 18 October 1958. The buildings were subsequently demolished and the area was redeveloped as an industrial estate.

== See also ==
- Timeline of the UK electricity supply industry
- List of power stations in England
