= Canterbury power station =

Power station in England

- Country: England United Kingdom
- Location: Canterbury
- Coordinates: 51°17′03″N 01°05′10″E
- Status: Decommissioned and demolished
- Construction began: 1898
- Commission date: 1900
- Decommission date: 1960
- Owners: Canterbury Corporation (1900–1948); British Electricity Authority (1948–1955); Central Electricity Authority (1955–1957); Central Electricity Generating Board (1958–1960)
- Operator: As owner

Thermal power station
- Primary fuel: Coal
- Turbine technology: steam turbines
- Cooling source: river water

Power generation
- Units operational: 1 x 1875 kW and 2 x 1250 kW turbo-alternators
- Make and model: Brush-Ljungstrom
- Nameplate capacity: 4.375 MW
- Annual net output: 5048 MWh in 1946

Canterbury power station supplied electricity to the city of Canterbury, Kent, England, from 1900 to 1960. This small generating station was owned and operated by Canterbury Corporation until the nationalisation of the British electricity supply industry in 1948. The power station was redeveloped several times: including the incorporation of new plant in the 1920s. Canterbury power station was decommissioned in about 1960.

== History ==
In 1883 a provisional order was granted by the Board of Trade under the Electric Lighting Acts for the generation and supply of electricity to the City of Canterbury. The Canterbury Electric Lighting Order 1883 was confirmed by Parliament in the Electric Lighting Orders Confirmation (No. 1) Act 1883 (46 & 47 Vict. c. ccxiii). However, no scheme was taken forward.

Another provisional order, the Canterbury Electric Lighting Order 1891, was obtained by the corporation under the Electric Lighting Orders Confirmation (No. 1) Act 1891 (54 & 55 Vict. c. xlix). The power station was built off Northgate Street (51°17′03″N 1°05′10″E) and first supplied electricity in 1900.

== Equipment specification ==
The initial plant two Belliss-Silvertown high-speed driving a dynamo either end of the engines capable of giving an output of 75 kilowatts at a pressure of from 220 to 250 volts. Steam was provided from two Lancashire boilers and a separate boiler powered by a dust destructor furnace.

By 1923 the generating plant comprised:

- Coal-fired boilers generating up to 33,000 lb/h (4.16 kg/s) of steam, the steam was supplied to:
- Generators:
  - 1 × 150 kW reciprocating engine driving a generator
  - 2 × 300 kW reciprocating engines driving generators
  - 1 × 1,250 kW steam turbo-alternators, generating 3-phase 50 Hz current at 6.6 kV.

Electricity supplies available to consumers were 220 and 440 V DC

=== New plant 1923–29 ===
New plant was commissioned over the period 1923–29 comprising:

- Boilers:
  - 2 × Babcock & Wilcox boilers with chain grate stokers, each producing 15,000 lb/h (1.89 kg/s) of steam, steam conditions 200 psi and 670 °F (13.8 bar, 354 °C)
- Generating equipment:
  - 1 × Brush-Ljungstrom 1,875 kW turbo-alternator
  - 2 × Brush-Ljungstrom 1,250 kW turbo-alternators, 3-phase 50 Hz 6.6 kV
  - 2 × Bruce-Peebles converters 500 kW and 250 kW

Condenser cooling water was drawn from the nearby River Stour.

== Operations ==
=== Operating data 1921–23 ===
The operating data for the period 1921–23 is shown in the table:

Canterbury power station operating data 1921–23
Electricity Use	Units	Year		
Electricity Use	Units	1921	1922	1923
Lighting and domestic use	MWh	356	395	470
Public lighting use	MWh	190	125	154
Traction	MWh	–	–	–
Power use	MWh	476	515	536
Total use	MWh	1,022	1,036	1,162
Load and connected load
Maximum load	kW	844	812	805
Total connections	kW	2,647	2,772	3,000
Load factor	Per cent	16.5	17.8	19.1
Financial
Revenue from sales of current	£	–	21,311	21,814
Surplus of revenue over expenses	£	–	7,198	10,079

Under the terms of the Electricity (Supply) Act 1926 (16 & 17 Geo. 5 c. 51) the Central Electricity Board (CEB) was established in 1926. The CEB identified high efficiency ‘selected’ power stations that would supply electricity most effectively. The CEB also constructed the national grid (1927–33) to connect power stations within a region.

=== Operating data 1946 ===
Canterbury power station operating data, 1946 was:

Canterbury power station operating data, 1946
Year	Load factor per cent	Max output load MW	Electricity supplied MWh	Thermal efficiency per cent
1946	–	4,030	5,048	–

The British electricity supply industry was nationalised in 1948 under the provisions of the Electricity Act 1947 (10 & 11 Geo. 6 c. 54). The Canterbury electricity undertaking was abolished, ownership of Canterbury power station was vested in the British Electricity Authority, and subsequently the Central Electricity Authority and the Central Electricity Generating Board (CEGB). At the same time the electricity distribution and sales responsibilities of the Canterbury electricity undertaking were transferred to the South Eastern Electricity Board (SEEBOARD).

=== Operating data 1954–58 ===
Operating data for the period 1954–58 is shown in the table:

Canterbury power station operating data, 1954–58
	Running hours	Max output capacity MW	Electricity supplied GWh	Thermal efficiency per cent
1954	1103	2	2.514	9.35
1955	738	2	1.309	9.94
1956	489	2	0.819	9.68
1957	775	2	1.356	10.20
1958	615	2	0.937	10.16

== Closure ==
The station was identified for closure in 1956 once the local network was reinforced which took place before 1959. The buildings were subsequently demolished and the area has been redeveloped with commercial units.

== See also ==
- Timeline of the UK electricity supply industry
- List of power stations in England
