= Tramways and Public Companies (Ireland) Act 1883 =

Act of the Parliament of the United Kingdom

Tramways and Public Companies (Ireland) Act 1883 (Note: Section 26.)
- Act of Parliament
- Parliament of the United Kingdom
- Long title: An Act for promoting the extension of Tramway communication in Ireland, and for assisting Emigration, and for extending certain provisions of the Land Law (Ireland) Act, 1881, to the case of Public Companies.
- Citation: 46 & 47 Vict. c. 43
- Territorial extent: United Kingdom

Dates
- Royal assent: 25 August 1883
- Commencement: 25 August 1883 (Note: The Acts of Parliament (Commencement) Act 1793.)
Other legislation
Amended by	Statute Law Revision Act 1950
Relates to	Land Law (Ireland) Act 1881

Status: Amended

Text of statute as originally enacted

The Tramways and Public Companies (Ireland) Act 1883 (46 & 47 Vict. c. 43) is an act of the Parliament of the United Kingdom. The act was a development of several earlier acts that was designed to facilitate the construction of economical railway infrastructure in rural Ireland.

== History ==
Earlier acts 1860 and 1861 had allowed for promoters to present their schemes to the Lord Lieutenant of Ireland subject to approval by the relevant grand juries. (Note: In Ireland the grand juries were the forerunners of county councils) The Lord Lieutenant would create at Order in Council to be confirmed by an Act of Parliament. The Relief of Distress (Ireland) Act 1880 (43 Vict. c. 4) allowed from contributions from baronies. This 1883 act gave grand juries the power to determine which baronies were chargeable, made Treasury loans available and allowed for loss making concerns to become the property of the local authority.

== Impact ==
296 1/2 miles (477.2 km) of railway were constructed under the act.

== Subsequent developments ==
Sections 13, 14, 15(1), 15(2), 16 and 18 of the act were repealed by section 1(1) of, and the first schedule to, the Statute Law Revision Act 1950 (14 Geo. 6. c. 6), which came into force on 23 May 1950.

== Bibliography ==
- Jenkins, Stanley C.; Newham, A.T. (1992) [1968]. The Cork and Muskerry Light Railway (2 ed.). Oxford: Oakwood Press. ISBN 0-85361-407-5. OCLC 221272762.
