= Bradford power station =

Former coal-fired power station in England

Bradford Power Station
- Official name: Valley Road Power Station
- Country: England
- Location: Bradford, West Yorkshire
- Coordinates: 53.802947°N 1.754141°W
- Status: Decommissioned and demolished
- Construction began: 1896
- Commission date: 1897
- Decommission date: 1976
- Operators: Bradford Corporation (1897–1948); British Electricity Authority (1948–1955); Central Electricity Authority (1955–1957); Central Electricity Generating Board (1958–1976)

Thermal power station
- Primary fuel: Coal

Power generation
- Nameplate capacity: 70 MW
- Annual net output: 79.655 GWh (1971)

Bradford Power Station (also known as Valley Road Power Station) was an electricity generating site located on Valley Road in Bradford, West Yorkshire, England. The primary source of fuel was coal which was railed into the sidings adjacent to the Bradford Forster Square to Shipley railway line. The plant operated for 79 years and had cooling towers constructed from wood and was noted for its 300-foot (91 m) chimney that was supposed to vent smoke away from the valley floor in Bradford Dale that the power station was located on.

The commissioning of a power station in Bradford as operated by the Bradford Corporation, made it the first municipal supplier of electricity in the United Kingdom.

== History ==
The Electric Lighting Act 1882 (45 & 46 Vict. c. 56) allowed individuals, private companies and local corporations (councils) the right to build and operate their own power generating sites. The Bradford Corporation, who also supplied water and other services to the City of Bradford, applied for a license and were granted the Bradford Electric Lighting Order 1883, though they did not commission anything until 1887 when a small generating site consisting of three steam driven 90 kW DC generators the steam being supplied by Lancashire hand-fired boilers. It is recorded that at the end of the first complete year’s working there were seventy-three consumers and 108,102 units had been sold.was built on Bolton Road. This made the Bradford Corporation the first municipal provider of electricity in the United Kingdom.

Valley Road Power Station

By the middle of the 1890s, it was clear that the original site in Bolton Road was not capable of generating the electrical needs of the growing city and so another site was commissioned between Canal Road and Valley Road in the north of the city which adjoined the Leeds and Bradford Railway lines approaching Forster Square station. The foundation stone was laid in June 1896 with Bradford Power Station opening a year later in 1897. The power station's location in the north end of the city, low in the valley of Bradforddale, meant that a 300-foot (91 m) chimney was constructed to vent the smoke away from the valley floor. The valley floor was heavily polluted by industries burning low carbon coal, so an order was instituted before the power station was built stipulating that chimneys were to be at least 90 feet (27 m) in height.

It was equipped with high speed DC generating sets of 210 kW and 380 kW capacity. The site was expanded again in 1903 and was originally laid out to have two engine rooms each containing five 1000 kW slow-speed generators with a boiler house situated between and running parallel to the engine-rooms. Only one of these engine-rooms was actually erected and in it four 1000-kW sets were installed. Technological developments were rapid at about this time, and in the space reserved for the fifth set three 4500 kW vertical turboalternators were installed between 1909 and 1910.

In 1897 the plant had a generating capacity of 2019 kW and the maximum load was 1123 kW. A total of 977.12 MWh of electricity was sold which powered 68,843 lamps, this provided an income to the corporation of £18,552-12-7d.

The first conversion of an urban tramway system from horse to electric power was in Bradford in 1892 supplied from Bolton Road.

In 1911 the first electric trolley buses were introduced Bradford and Leeds.

By 1912 there were two station in use at Valley Road. The earlier station contain 12 Willans engines some of which had been relocated from the original Bolton road station. The second station contained four 1,000 kW reciprocating engines two having been supplied by Messrs. Cole, Marchent & Morley and two by Messrs. John Musgrave & Sons all driving a British Westinghouse generator. Added to this were 2 x 3,000 kW and a 4,500 kW BTH Curtis vertical turbo alternators. Boiler capacity was spread across both stations with five 15,000 lb/hr Babcock & Wilcox boilers with chain grate stokers in the early station and ten 18,000 lb/hr Babcock & Wilcox boilers of a similar type to the above in the later station.

In 1915 a 15,000 kW Parsons set was installed followed by a 2nd set in 1920.

By 1923 the generating plant comprised both AC and DC machinery. The AC plant included three 3,000 kW, one 5,000 kW and two 15,000 kW turbo-alternators (a total of 38,000 kW) which supplied 3-phase, 50 Hz AC at 400 and 230 Volts. The 230 and 460 volt DC supply was generated by a 1,000 kW reciprocating machine. In 1923 the maximum load on the system was 32,640 kW from 75,175 connections from consumers. The total number of units sold that year was 65,456,551 kWh raising £440,091. The surplus of revenue over expenses was £231,871.

In 1925 a 20,000 kW machine was commissioned which consisted of a tandem high pressure and low pressure turbines. At the time this was the largest 3,000 rpm machine in use.

In 1931 a topping turbine was installed at Valley Road. This was an English Electric Company 2.5 MW, 6,000 rpm machine. It used steam at 1,100 psi and 800 °F (75.9 bar and 427 °C), which exhausted to existing steam mains at 205 psi (14.1 bar).

A new turbo power generator was installed on the site in 1930. It was named Princess Mary and was unveiled by its namesake Princess Mary. This made Bradford Power station the most powerful generating concern under local authority control at that time. The power station was extended in 1939 and again in 1947 by replacing the older 15 MW sets with 22.5MW sets powered by three new boilers so that by its closure in 1976, it was capable of generating 70 megaWatts of power. It was noted for its 12 Davenport Towers (cooling towers constructed of wood, which at the Bradford site were over 140-foot (43 m) high, some of the highest noted in England). (Note: Davenport Towers were so called as they were constructed by Davenport Engineering who were located in Harris Street, Bradford.) The timber towers had a capacity of 5.335 million gallons per hour (6.74 m^{3}/s). By the time of its closure, the power station also had one conventional concrete cooling tower at the northern end of the site besides retaining many of the original wooden towers. The concrete tower had a capacity of 1.25 million gallons per hour (1.58 m^{3}/s).

The power station consumed 200 tonnes (220 tons) of coal per day which also resulted in over 3,000,000 imperial gallons (14,000,000 L; 3,600,000 US gal) of water being used through the system. Coal was railed into the site via a conveyor system located on the western side of the station via the Midland Railway sidings in Valley Road.

Upon nationalisation of the British electricity supply industry in 1948 the ownership of Bradford power station was vested in the British Electricity Authority, and subsequently the Central Electricity Authority and the Central Electricity Generating Board (CEGB). The electricity distribution and sales functions were vested in the Yorkshire Electricity Board.

By the late 1950s the station comprised six Babcock & Wilcox boilers with a total evaporative capacity of 1,080,000 pounds per hour (136.1 kg/s) operating at 650 psi at 850 °F (44.8 bar at 454 °C). There were five turbo-alternators: one 20 MW and one 30 MW English Electric (6.6 kV); one 30 MW English Electric (33 kV); one 22.5 MW (6.6 kV) and one 22.5 MW (33 kV) Parsons sets.

By 1960, the power station on Valley Road was supplying electricity to over 134,000 homes.

The output of the station in the late 1950s and early 1960s was:

Bradford power station output GWh
	High pressure station	Low pressure station
1953/4	277.75	33.98
1954/5	319.09	41.32
1955/6	276.01	28.68
1956/7	214.52	11.57
1957/8	142.13	15.85
	Combined output	
1960/1	244.85	
1961/2	261.09	
1962/3	263.38	
1966/7	296.19	

In 1971 the station had an installed capacity of 75 MW including one 30 MW generator and several smaller machines. The boilers had an output capacity of 1,080,000 pounds per hour (136 kg/s) of steam at 625 psi (43.1 bar) and 441 °C. In 1971 the station delivered 79.66 GWh of electricity.

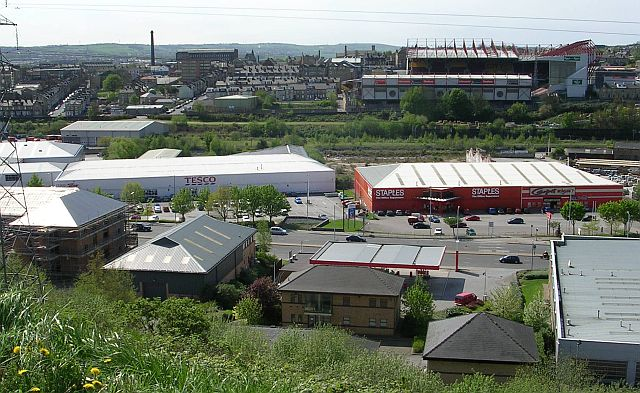
Retail units near the site of the former power station

The power station was given a 12 month notice of closure in October 1975, with full closure being effected in October 1976. The site was demolished in 1978 and is now occupied by commercial and industrial units.
