= Stoke-on-Trent power station =

Former coal-fired power station in England

Central Power House
- Country: England
- Location: Stoke-on-Trent
- Coordinates: 53°01′01″N 02°10′18″W
- Status: Decommissioned and demolished
- Commission date: 1913
- Decommission date: 1960s
- Owners: Stoke-on-Trent Corporation (1913–1928); North West Midlands Joint Electricity Authority (1928–1948); British Electricity Authority (1948–1955); Central Electricity Authority (1955–1957); Central Electricity Generating Board (1958–1964)
- Operator: As owner

Thermal power station
- Primary fuel: Coal
- Turbine technology: Steam turbines
- Cooling towers: 7 (wood)
- Cooling source: Circulating water and cooling towers

Power generation
- Units operational: 2 × 3 MW and 2 × 12 MW
- Make and model: Metropolitan-Vickers
- Nameplate capacity: 31 MW (1955)
- Annual net output: 125,905 MWh (1935-6)

Central Power House (Hanley) supplied electricity to the county borough and later city of Stoke-on-Trent, England and the surrounding area from the 10 April 1913 to the 1960s. The power station was initially owned and operated by Stoke-on-Trent Corporation, then by the North West Midlands Joint Electricity Authority prior to the nationalisation of the British electricity supply industry in 1948. The power station operated in conjunction with power stations at Burslem, Hanley (original smaller power station adjacent to the site of the Central Power House), Stoke-upon-Trent and Longton.

== History ==
=== Hanley ===
Electricity was first made available in the Potteries area from a power station at Bethesda Road, Hanley, adjacent to the Trent and Mersey Canal (53°01′02″N 2°10′21″W). This was owned by Hanley Corporation, who had been authorised to supply electricity under the Hanley Electric Lighting Order 1891, and first generated electricity on 26 July 1894.

The station had a generating capacity of 624 kW, and supplied 100Hz AC power. In 1898 it supplied 255,383 kWh to 30 customers, plus 96,379 kWh for public lamps. In 1913 it contained two Ferranti engines with central flywheel disc alternators (of 300 kw. and 600 kw. capacity), and two Howden-Westinghouse high-speed direct-coupled revolving field units (with a capacity of 500 k.v.A. each).

=== Longton ===
Longton Corporation were authorised to supply electricity by the Longton Electric Supply Order 1899.

A DC generating station at Edward Street (later renamed King Edward Street, now demolished) Longton (52°59′21″N 2°08′22″W) was commissioned at the corporation's gasworks site in September 1901. In 1910 it had a generating capacity of 600 kW. from Belliss-E.C.C. direct-coupled sets (consisting of two 150 kw. and one 300 kw).

=== Stoke-upon-Trent ===
Stoke-upon-Trent Corporation was authorised to supply electricity by the Stoke-upon-Trent Electric Lighting Order 1898. The area of supply was extended by the Stoke-upon-Trent Electric Lighting (Extension) Order 1907.

A DC generating station was constructed by the corporation at Bagnall Street (since renamed Yeaman Street) Stoke-upon-Trent (53°00′00″N 2°11′10″W) in 1904. In 1913 it contained Willans central valve engines and Dick Kerr dynamos (two with a capacity of 150 kw. and two with a capacity of 250 kw.)

=== Burslem ===
Burslem Corporation was authorised to supply electricity by the Burslem Electric Lighting Order 1898. The following year, the Burslem Electric Lighting (Extension) Order 1899 extended their supply area to cover Wolstanton, and the Burslem Electric Lighting (Extension to Tunstall) Order 1905 gave a further extension to Tunstall, under an arrangement with Tunstall Urban District Council.

A DC generating station was constructed on Federation Road, off Scotia Road, Burslem (53°03′00″N 2°11′59″W) in 1905, at a cost of £40,000. In 1913 it contained three Howden Dick Kerr highs peed units (of capacities 100, 200 and 350 kw. respectively) and a 600 kw. Belliss-Siemens mixed pressure turbine.

=== Stoke-on-Trent ===
The 'six towns' were federated to form the county borough of Stoke-on-Trent in April 1910. Electricity supplies were brought under common management in 1910: Stoke-on-Trent Corporation organised its electricity undertaking into four districts, based upon the original three corporation supply areas: Northern Area for the Burslem undertaking, Central Area for the Hanley Corporation undertaking, South Eastern Area for the Longton Corporation undertaking, and South Western Area for the Stoke-upon-Trent undertaking. The supply was integrated from 1 April 1914.

Construction of a large a new power station on the River Trent was started alongside the existing original Hanley power station. The Central Power House (53°01′01″N 02°10′18″W) was commissioned in April 1913, supplying 50 Hz AC power. It contained three Stirling water-tube boilers, each having a steaming capacity of 18,900 lb. per hour powering two Howden-Siemens turbo alternators of 1,500 kW capacity. Further electricity generating plant was added to the station from 1919 to 1929.

Central Power House was the main Electricity Works, and the Hanley, Longton, Burslem and Stoke-upon-Trent sites were referred to as 'Sub-Works'. The Hanley Sub-Works was fitted with motor-generators to convert the 50 Hz AC supply to 100 Hz AC. The Longton, Burslem and Stoke-upon-Trent Sub-Works were later fitted with rotary converters and used as conversion stations during the transitioning period of DC to AC electricity supplies. Once the changeover from DC to AC was fully complete just before Christmas 1938, the conversion equipment was sold and these sub-works were later used as regular distribution substations as part of the wider network of 120 substations planned as a minimum to supply the city.

The first AC 6.6kV substation switched on in the city was at the Goldendale Iron Co. Ltd in Tunstall and was switched on in 1915. The second being at the Electric and Ordnance Accessories Co. Ltd in Slippery Lane, Hanley of the same year. These no longer exist and were decommissioned many years ago. The oldest surviving substation is located at Napier Street, Fenton, (53°00′02″N 2°10′13″W) originally called Boving which was the third substation commissioned. This is thought to have been switched on in 1923, the large gap since the second substation being due to the War.

== Equipment specification ==
=== Plant in 1923 ===
In 1923 the generating stations and their plant comprised:

Stoke-on-Trent electricity plant 1923
Plant	Burslem	Hanley	Stoke	Central Power House
Boiler plant, lb/h (kg/s)	44,000 (5.5)	42,000 (5.29)	32,000 (4.03)	190,000 (23.94)
Steam-driven AC generating plant	1 × 1 MW turbine	2 × 0.5 MW reciprocating engines	1 × 1 MW turbine	2 × 1.5 MW turbines 2 × 3 MW turbines
Steam-driven DC generating plant	1 × 0.35 MW reciprocating engine 1 × 0.6 MW turbine	–	2 × 0.25 MW reciprocating engines	–

The following types of electric current were available to consumers:

- Single phase, alternating current (AC) at 400, 200 and 100 volts
- 3-phase, 50 Hz AC at 415 and 240 volts
- Direct current (DC) 440 and 220 volts
- DC 460 and 230 volts
- DC 480 and 240 volts

=== Plant in 1955 ===
By 1955, the plant at Stoke-on-Trent power station comprised:

- Boilers:
  - 2 × Babcock & Wilcox boilers with chain grate stokers
  - 2 × Thompson boilers with underfeed travelling grates
  - 4 × Stirling boilers with underfeed travelling grates

The boilers had a total evaporative capacity of 360,000 lb/h (45.36 kg/s), and operated at 275 psi and 660 °F (19.0 bar at 349 °C), steam was supplied to:

- Turbo-alternators:
  - 2 × Metropolitan-Vickers 3.0 MW turbo-alternator, generating at 6.6 kV
  - 2 × Metropolitan-Vickers 12.0 MW turbo-alternator, generating at 6.6 kV

The total installed generating capacity was 31 MW

Condenser cooling water was cooled in seven Davenport wood cooling towers with a capacity of 1.783 million gallons per hour (8,106 m^{3}/h).

== Operations ==
=== Operating data 1921–23 ===
The operating data for Stoke-on-Trent power station in the period 1921–23 was:

Stoke-on-Trent power station operating data 1921–23
Electricity use	Units	Year		
Electricity use	Units	1921	1922	1923
Lighting and domestic use	MWh	2,139	2,157	2,582
Public lighting use	MWh	456	440	510
Traction	MWh	17	2	25
Power use	MWh	8,063	6,494	7,574
Bulk supply	MWh	130	96	169
Total use	MWh	10,806	9,189	10,880
Load and connected load
Maximum load	kW	6,185	5,969	6,740
Total connections	kW	16,664	17,444	19,384
Load factor	Per cent	28.2	25.5	25.7
Financial
Revenue from sales of current	£	–	135,302	154,899
Surplus of revenue over expenses	£	–	50,222	71,410

Under the terms of the Electricity (Supply) Act 1926 (16 & 17 Geo. 5. c. 51) the Central Electricity Board (CEB) was established in 1926. The CEB identified high efficiency 'selected' power stations that would supply electricity most effectively; Stoke-on-Trent was designated a selected station. The CEB also constructed the National Grid (1927–33) to connect power stations within a region. Stoke-on-Trent power station was operated under the direction of the CEB from 1934. The North West Midlands Joint Electricity Authority (JEA) assumed ownership of the Stoke and Stafford generating undertakings in 1928. The JEA generated electricity which was purchased by the Stoke-on-Trent and Stafford corporations and sold to industrial, commercial and domestic consumers. Operating data in the mid-1930s was:

Stoke-on-Trent power station operating data 1934–36
Operating data	Year 1934–35	Year 1935–36
Plant capacity kW	37,000	37,000
Maximum demand kW	27,600	32,000
Load factor %	37.62	44.79
Units generated MWh	90,946	125,905
Units imported MWh	1,869	339
Units exported MWh	4,140	17,508

Despite the growth of electricity consumption in the mid-1930s, there were still black spots where the availability of electricity was limited. In the city centre slums and outlying working class suburbs of towns such as Stoke-on-Trent more than a quarter of the streets had no electricity service available.

=== Operating data 1946 and 1947 ===
Stoke-on-Trent power station operating data for 1946 was:

Stoke-on-Trent (and Stafford) power station operating data in 1946
Power station	Load factor per cent	Max output load MW	Electricity supplied MWh	Thermal efficiency per cent
Stoke-on-Trent	21.1	27.6	50,970	13.62
Stafford	–	7.432	5,035	–

Stoke-on-Trent power station operating data for 1947 was:

Stoke-on-Trent power station 1947
Maximum load, MW	55,000
Electricity purchased kWh	14,197
Electricity sold kWh	207,472
Revenue from sales £	890,316
Number of consumers	60,704

The British electricity supply industry was nationalised in 1948 under the provisions of the Electricity Act 1947 (10 & 11 Geo. 6. c. 54). The Stoke-on-Trent undertaking and the Joint Electricity Authority were abolished, ownership of Stoke-on-Trent power station was vested in the British Electricity Authority, and subsequently the Central Electricity Authority and the Central Electricity Generating Board (CEGB). At the same time the electricity distribution and sales responsibilities of the Stoke-on-Trent electricity undertaking were transferred to the Midlands Electricity Board (MEB).

Following nationalisation the Stoke-on-Trent area became a district electricity supply area; for commercial operation the area was split into three districts: Stoke central, Stoke north and Stoke south. The amount of electricity sold and number of customers was:

Electricity sold and No. of customers 1956–58
District		Stoke Central	Stoke North	Stoke South
Area square miles		7	10	16
Population (1956)		70,800	77,600	123,300
Electricity sold MWh	1956	110,372	93,234	220,421
Electricity sold MWh	1957	120,131	98,655	242,939
Electricity sold MWh	1958	128,413	118,130	278,134
No. of consumers	1956	24,950	22,472	38,585
No. of consumers	1957	25,229	23,334	39,646
No. of consumers	1958	25,427	23,303	40,369

=== Operating data 1954–63 ===
Operating data for the period 1954–63 was:

Stoke-on-Trent power station operating data, 1954–63
Year	Running hours or load factor (per cent)	Max output capacity MW	Electricity supplied GWh	Thermal efficiency per cent
1954	2864	28	34.872	13.81
1955	2840	27	35.620	13.38
1956	2732	27	30.980	13.12
1957	2354	27	25.510	13.13
1958	644	27	5.021	9.67
1961	(4.5%)	23	9.129	12.14
1962	(3.0 %)	23	6.085	12.86
1963	(5.21 %)	23	10.498	12.93

== Closure ==
Hanley power station and the Central Power House were decommissioned after 1964. (Note: The station appears in the CEGB Annual Report and Accounts 1963, but is not in the CEGB Statistical Yearbook 1972.) The power station was demolished in 1975 and the site was redeveloped as housing.

Longton was used as a 6.6kV substation following the removal of the generating equipment and the demolition of the chimney stack and outbuildings until the construction of the A50 called for its demolition in the 1990s.

Stoke-on-Trent was later used as 132/33/11kV substation following some minor demolition of older outbuildings until a new substation was commissioned nearby alongside the A500 in 1998. The old site was decommissioned and has since lay empty.

Burslem was later demolished and the site repurposed as a 132/33/11kV substation which is still in use today.

== See also ==
- Timeline of the UK electricity supply industry
- List of power stations in England
- Meaford Power Station
- Stafford power station
