= Coventry power stations =

Pair of former power stations in Coventry, England

- Country: England
- Location: Coventry
- Coordinates: 52°27′23″N 01°28′03″W
- Status: Decommissioned
- Construction began: 1893, 1926
- Commission date: 1895, 1928
- Decommission date: 1976
- Owners: Coventry Corporation (1895–1948); British Electricity Authority (1948–1955); Central Electricity Authority (1955–1957); Central Electricity Generating Board (1958–1976)
- Operator: As owner

Thermal power station
- Primary fuel: Coal
- Turbine technology: Steam turbines
- Cooling towers: 7
- Cooling source: Circulating cooling water and cooling towers

Power generation
- Units operational: see text
- Nameplate capacity: 130.75 MW
- Annual net output: 279n GWh (1946)

The two Coventry power stations supplied electricity to the county borough of Coventry and the wider Warwickshire area from 1895 to 1976. They were owned and operated by Coventry Corporation until the nationalisation of the British electricity supply industry in 1948. The first power station was established in 1895 off Sandy Lane north of the city centre. A new larger power station was built at Longford / Hawksbury Junction in 1928 and was extended in 1938 and 1941. The Longford station was decommissioned in October 1976.

== History ==
In 1891 Coventry Corporation applied for a provisional order under the Electric Lighting Acts to generate and supply electricity to the borough of Coventry. The Coventry Electric Lighting Order 1891 was granted by the Board of Trade and was confirmed by Parliament through the Electric Lighting Orders Confirmation (No. 4) Act 1891 (54 & 55 Vict. c. lii). The power station was built in Sandy Lane adjacent to the Coventry Canal (52°25′04″N 1°30′43″W), facilitating the supply of coal by barge. The generating station first supplied electricity in November 1895. The station was extended several times especially during the First World War to meet increased demand for electricity especially from munitions factories.

Further demand for electricity in the inter-war period led to a larger power station being built in 1926–28 in Aldermans Green Road, Longford (52°27′23″N 1°28′03″W) five miles north-east of Coventry. This was also extended several times in 1938 and 1941.

== Equipment specification ==
=== Coventry (Sandy Lane) power station ===
The original plant at Coventry (Sandy Lane) power station comprised horizontal engines coupled by ropes to Fowler dynamos. In 1898 the generating capacity was 350 kW and the maximum load was 126 kW.

==== First World War plant ====
During the First World War new plant was installed to meet growing demand for electricity. Coventry was a major armaments centre and there was a three-fold increase generating capability during the war. By 1923 the generating plant at Coventry comprised:

- Coal-fired boilers generating up to 440,000 lb/h (55.4 kg/s) of steam, this was supplied to:
- Generators:
  - 2 × 600 kW reciprocating engines driving alternators
  - 4 × 300 kW steam turbo-alternators
  - 2 × 600 kW steam turbo-alternators

These machines gave a total generating capacity of 25,200 kW of alternating current.

A variety of electricity supplies were available to consumers:

- 2-phase, 50 Hz AC at 6,600, 2,000 and 200 Volts.

=== Coventry (Longford) power station 1928 ===
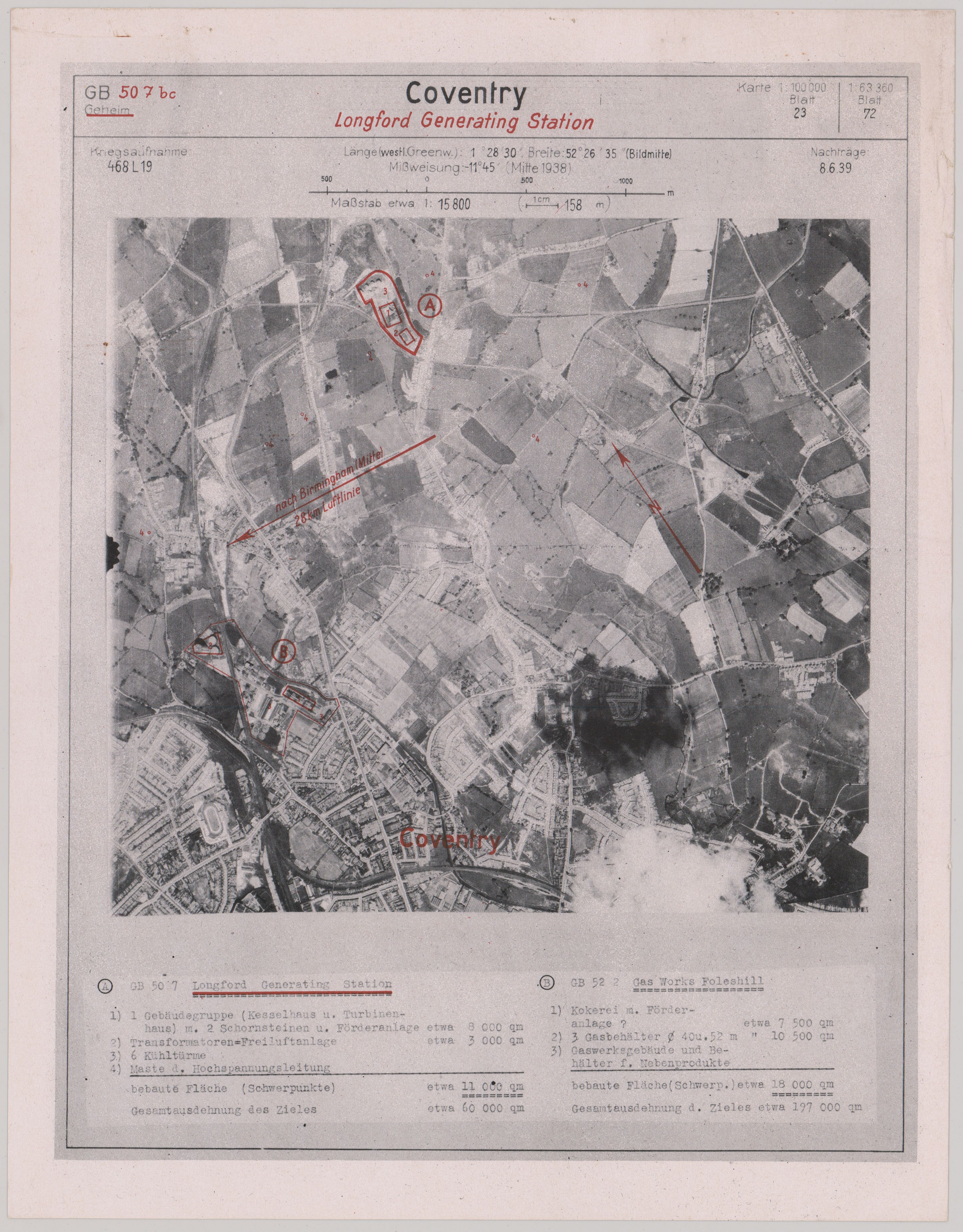
Longford Generating Station on a target dossier of the German Luftwaffe, 1939

A new power station at Longford / Hawkesbury Junction was sanctioned in August 1926 and was commissioned in October 1928.

The main contractors for the works were British Thomson-Houston Company of Rugby. Sub-contractors included Cleveland Bridge & Engineering Company, Wilson Lovatt, Stirling Boiler Company, and Pirelli-General Cable work.

The engine room and boiler house were constructed on mass concrete foundations. The buildings were steel framed with infill of brick and artificial stone. The coal handling equipment was capable of handling 50 tons an hour from the canal or from the railway sidings.

The station was officially opened on 31 October 1928.

The initial configuration of plant was:

- Boilers:
  - 8 × Stirling tri-drum boilers with chain grate stokers, each producing 50,000 lb/h (6.3 kg/s) of steam, steam conditions were 325 psi and superheat to 700°F (22.4 bar, 371°C), steam was supplied to:
- Turbo-alternators:
  - 2 × British Thomson-Houston 19.25 MW turbo-alternators, generating at 6.6 kV with associated auxiliary alternators of 714kVA to run the boiler plant.
- Cooling towers:
  - 4 × hyperbolic cooling towers each with a capacity of 600,000 gallons per hour (0.76 m^{3}/s), make up water was drawn from the adjacent Oxford Canal.

Coal was delivered by barge from the canal, and via a siding off the Coventry to Nuneaton railway line.

==== First and second extensions ====
These extensions to the power station comprised:

- Boilers:
  - 4 × John Thompson tri-drum boilers with chain grate stokers, each producing 150,000 lb/h (18.9 kg/s) of steam, steam conditions were 325 psi and superheat to 720°F (22.4 bar, 382°C), steam was supplied to:
- Turbo-alternators:
  - 2 × British Thomson-Houston 30.75 MW turbo-alternators, 3,000 rpm generating at 33 kV.
- Cooling towers:
  - 2 × hyperbolic cooling towers each with a capacity of 1.5 million gallons per hour (1.89 m^{3}/s), arranged in a lozenge plan with the 1928 towers.

==== Third extension ====
This extension comprised:

- Boilers:
  - 2 × John Thompson tri-drum boilers with chain grate stokers, each producing 150,000 lb/h (18.9 kg/s) of steam, steam conditions were 325 psi and superheat to 720°F (22.4 bar, 382°C), steam was supplied to:
- Turbo-alternator:
  - 1 × British Thomson-Houston 30.75 MW turbo-alternator, 3,000 rpm generating at 33 kV
- Cooling tower:
  - 1 × hyperbolic cooling tower with a capacity of 1.5 million gallons per hour (1.89 m^{3}/s).

== Operations ==
In 1898 the maximum electricity demand on the Sandy Lane station was 126 kW. 79.583 MWh of electricity was sold to 100 customers and there were 8,149 lamps on the circuits. The revenue in 1898 was £5,018 and the operating expenditure was £1,166.

=== Operating data 1921–23 ===
The operating data for the period 1921–23 is summarised in the table:

Coventry power station operating data 1921–23
Electricity Use	Units	Year		
Electricity Use	Units	1921	1922	1923
Lighting and domestic use	MWh	2,873	2,709	3,195
Public lighting use	MWh	46	72	99
Traction	MWh	502	403	579
Power use	MWh	28,003	22,950	30,952
Total use	MWh	31,425	26,135	34,826
Load and connected load
Maximum load	kW	17,815	16,250	18,800
Total connections	kW	41,806	42,706	44,043
Load factor	Per cent	23.6	21.7	23.9
Financial
Revenue from sales of current	£	–	234,778	201,124
Surplus of revenue over expenses	£	–	62,220	99,930

The data shows the general growth of demand and use of electricity.

Under the terms of the Electricity (Supply) Act 1926 the Central Electricity Board (CEB) was established in 1926. The CEB identified high efficiency ‘selected’ power stations that would supply electricity most effectively; Coventry was designated a selected station. The CEB also constructed the National Grid (1927–33) to connect power stations within a region.

=== Operating data 1946 ===
Coventry (Longford) power station operating data in 1946, just prior to nationalisation, was as follows:

Coventry power station operating data, 1954–72
Year	Load factor per cent	Max output load MW	Electricity supplied GWh	Thermal efficiency per cent
1946	34.9	91,060	278.69	16.55

The British electricity supply industry was nationalised in 1948 under the provisions of the Electricity Act 1947. The Coventry electricity undertaking was abolished, ownership of Coventry power station was vested in the British Electricity Authority, and subsequently the Central Electricity Authority and the Central Electricity Generating Board (CEGB).

At the same time the electricity distribution and sales responsibilities of the Coventry electricity undertaking were transferred to the East Midlands Electricity Board (EMEB).

=== Operating data 1954–72 ===
Operating data for the period 1954–72 is shown in the table:

Coventry power station operating data, 1954–72
Year	Running hours or load factor (per cent)	Max output capacity MW	Electricity supplied GWh	Thermal efficiency per cent
1954	3687	120	157.219	16.98
1955	4237	120	199.893	17.40
1956	4269	120	199.074	17.32
1957	4153	111	184.495	17.60
1958	3940	111	179.904	18.01
1961	(12.6 %)	117	129.267	17.97
1962	(13.9 %)	117	142.590	17.45
1963	(17.87 %)	117	183.105	17.60
1967	(13.1 %)	117	134.059	16.05
1972	(11.3 %)	84	83.81	16.33

The data demonstrates the declining usage, capacity and supply over the period 1954–72.

== Closure and redevelopment ==
The Sandy Lane power station buildings, renamed Electric Wharf, have been redeveloped as residential and commercial use.

Coventry (Longford) power station was decommissioned on 25 October 1976. The buildings and structures were subsequently demolished and as of 2020 the area is unused. However, the location's association with electricity continues. East of the Oxford Canal is the 275 kV Coventry substation that feeds the 132 kV Coventry North substation south of the former power station site.

== See also ==
- Timeline of the UK electricity supply industry
- List of power stations in England
