= Tir John power station =

Power station in Wales

- Country: Wales
- Location: Swansea
- Coordinates: 51°37′35″N 03°53′50″W
- Status: Decommissioned and demolished
- Construction began: 1932
- Commission date: 1935
- Decommission date: 1976
- Owners: Swansea Corporation (1932–1948); British Electricity Authority (1948–1955); Central Electricity Authority (1955–1957); Central Electricity Generating Board (1958–1976)
- Operator: As owner

Thermal power station
- Primary fuel: Coal, later oil
- Turbine technology: Steam turbines
- Chimneys: 2
- Cooling source: Seawater

Power generation
- Units operational: 2 x 30 MW, 2 x 41.5 MW, 1 x 12.5 MW
- Make and model: Brush-Ljungstrom, Parsons, British Thomson-Houston
- Nameplate capacity: 142 MW
- Annual net output: 784 GWh (1956)

Tir John power station supplied electricity to the Swansea area and to the national grid from 1935 to 1976. It was initially owned and operated by the Swansea Corporation until the nationalisation of the electricity supply industry in 1948. The power station was built in several phases from 1935 to 1944. It was converted from coal to oil-firing in 1967; Tir John power station was decommissioned in 1976.

== History ==
Swansea Corporation planned to build Tir John power station partly as an unemployment relief scheme, in the early 1930s. It was designed to be an integral part of the recently commissioned National Grid (built 1927–33). The plans for Tir John were sanctioned in 1931 and construction started the following year. At that time it was the largest construction project in Wales. The power station was officially opened on 20 June 1935.

== Equipment specification ==
The first equipment to be commissioned was the low pressure (LP) plant comprising a British Thomson-Houston 12.5 MW turbo-alternator. This was supplied with stream at 250 psi and 795 °F (17.2 bar at 424 °C). Current was generated at 6.6 kV.

At opening in 1935 the station was equipped with 2 x 30,000 kW C A Parsons turbo alternators. Further plant was commissioned in 1941 and 1944. When completed the station comprised:

- Boilers
  - 4 × International Combustion tri-drum boilers evaporating at 230,000 lb/h (29.00 kg/s) and operating at 625 psi and 850 °F (43.1 bar and 454 °C).
  - 4 × International Combustion tri-drum boilers evaporating at 240,000 lb/h (30.2 kg/s) and also operating at 625 psi and 850 °F.

The boilers were supplied with pulverised coal produced from waste anthracite duff by Hardinge ball mills.

The boilers could deliver a total of 1,880,000 lb/h (23.7 kg/s) of steam to:

- Turbo-alternators
  - 2 × Parsons 30 MW turbo-alternators with a maximum continuous capacity of 33 kV, 0.8 P.F., 50 Hz, 3,000 rpm, generating at 33 kV. Operated by steam at 600 psi and 825 °F (41.4 bar and 441 °C).
  - 2 × Brush-Ljungstrom 41.5 MW turbo-alternators, one generating at 33 kV and one at 132 kV, 0.75 P.F., 50 Hz, 1,500 rpm. Operated by steam at 600 psi and 825 °F (41.4 bar and 441 °C).

Cooling water for the condensers was taken from Kings Dock via a 900 yards (820 m) long, 9-foot (2.7 m) diameter tunnel. Water was discharged into Queens Dock via a 1,300 yard (1189) long tunnel of the same diameter.

The power station included a flue-gas washing plant to remove sulphur oxides and dust from the gases. There were four scrubbers, one for each boiler, constructed of steel plates, each contained wooden grids sprayed with water treated with lime. Flue-gases passed vertically through the grids, the water /lime solution dissolving the sulphur compounds. Water from the base of the scrubbers passed to holding tanks to allow the chemical reactions to complete. The water was recirculated to the scrubbers, with some drawn off to remove the solids. Make-up water for the scrubbers was drawn from Crymlyn Bog.

== Operations ==
Tir John power station was operated by Swansea Corporation under the direction of the Central Electricity Board from 1935 and though the Second World War until 1948.

Tir John power station operating on anthracite duff had the cheapest fuel costs of any power station in the country.

The connection to the national grid was at a 132 kV substation south of the power station.

The British electricity supply industry was nationalised in 1948 under the provisions of the Electricity Act 1947 (10 & 11 Geo. 6. c. 54). The Swansea Corporation electricity undertaking was abolished, ownership of Tir John power station was vested in the British Electricity Authority, and subsequently the Central Electricity Authority and the Central Electricity Generating Board (CEGB). At the same time the electricity distribution and sales responsibilities of the Swansea electricity undertaking were transferred to the South Wales Electricity Board (SWALEB).

The CEGB converted the boilers to run on oil in 1967. This was to take advantage of fuel supplies from the nearby Llandarcy oil refinery.

=== Operational data ===
Operating data for the period 1946–72 is given in the table:

Tir John power station operating data, 1946–72.
Year	Running hours or load factor (per cent)	Max output capacity MW	Electricity supplied GWh	Thermal efficiency per cent
1946	56.8%	99.60	495.45	20.44
1954	8760	142	771.37	19.49
1955	8760	142	776.30	19.01
1956	8784	142	783.69	19.41
1957	8760	142	696.88	19.31
1958	8760	142	660.41	18.16
1961	40.1%	142	498.67	15.83
1962	16.9%	142	209.76	15.01
1963	17.93%	142	223.00	13.69
1967	10.5	142	130.62	14.36
1972	31.6%	64	205.26	19.43

The less intensive use of the station after 1956 is evident.

Electricity supplied (GWh)

== Closure ==
Tir John power station was decommissioned in 1976. The buildings subsequently demolished. The 132 kV substation and its connections to the national grid is extant and currently utilised by the Tir John STOR (2020).

== See also ==
- Timeline of the UK electricity supply industry
- List of power stations in Wales
