= Chadderton Power Station =

Two coal-fired power stations in England

Chadderton A & B power stations
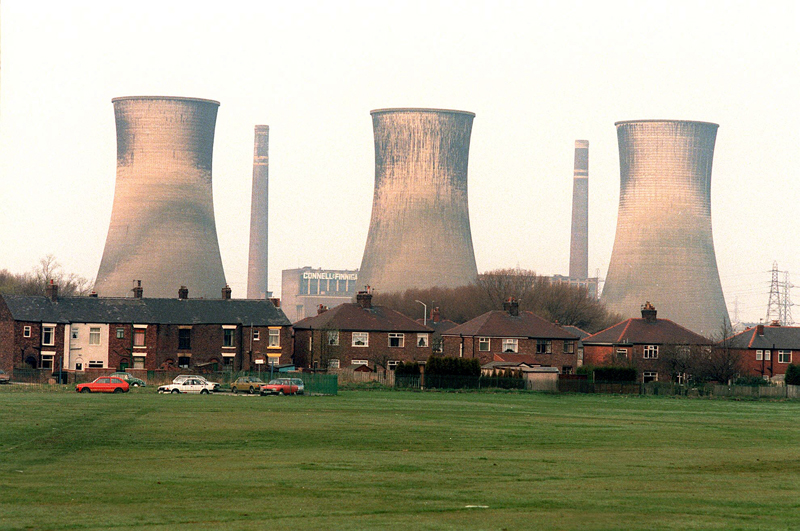
- Chadderton B Power Station shortly before demolition in 1986
- Country: England
- Location: Chadderton
- Coordinates: 53.531640°N 2.165911°W
- Status: Demolished
- Construction began: A station: 1925; B station: 1950
- Commission date: A station: 1927; B station: 1955
- Decommission date: A station: 1967–1972; B station: 1982
- Operators: Oldham Corporation (1927-1948); British Electricity Authority (1948-1955); Central Electricity Authority (1955-1957); Central Electricity Generating Board (1958-1982)

Thermal power station
- Primary fuel: Coal
- Turbine technology: Steam turbines
- Chimneys: A station 8, B station 2
- Cooling towers: A station 6, B station 3
- Cooling source: Circulating water cooling towers

Power generation
- Units operational: B station: Four 60 MW Metropolitan-Vickers
- Units decommissioned: All decommissioned
- Nameplate capacity: B station: 240 MW
- Annual net output: 893.96 GWh (1971), 109.13 GWh (1981)

External links
- Commons: Related media on Commons

Chadderton Power Station refers to a sequence of two coal-fired power stations, which were situated at Chadderton, Greater Manchester in North West England.

== Slacks Valley (Chadderton A) Power Station ==
=== History ===
The first power station to be constructed at Chadderton was built around 1925–1929 and was commissioned in November 1929 for the County Borough of Oldham in the Slacks Valley. The station was fuelled by coal and had six cooling towers and eight chimneys. This station was decommissioned at some time between 1967 and 1972 it was subsequently demolished.

The principal plant at Chadderton A station comprised:

- Eight Babcock and Wilcox 50,000 pounds per hour (6.3 kg/s) steam boilers operating at 275 psi and 700 °F (18.96 bar and 371 °C) with chain grate stokers,
- Three 13.75 MW Metropolitan-Vickers turbo-alternators (6.6 kV), total capacity 41.25 MW,
- Six Premier chimney type cooling towers with a capacity of 1.8 million gallons per hour (2.27 m^{3}/s).

The electricity output from Chadderton A power station was:

A station electricity sent out, GWh
Year	Station output GWh	Thermal efficiency, %
1946	97.91	17.14
1953/4	73.16	16.83
1954/5	46.23	16.02
1955/6	19.03	14.67
1956/7	52.78	16.91
1957/8	22.81	14.89
1960/1	5.12	11.25
1961/2	8.82	11.57
1962/3	17.14	12.24
1966/7	26.65	12.51

== Chadderton B Power Station ==
=== History ===
==== Development ====
In 1943, Oldham Corporation investigated the anticipated growth of load on their distribution area, and so a scheme was prepared to replace the existing Slacks Valley station. The preparation plan, drawn up by Kennedy & Donkin, considered other sites for the replacement but decided that the existing site at Chadderton was the most suitable, with an envisaged capacity of 120,000 kW, using four 30,000 kW turbo-alternators, installed at intervals of two at a time. However following discussion with the then Central Electricity Board, this was revised to four 50,000 kW sets, giving the station a capacity of 200,000 kW. This was revised again with the standardisation of unit sizes and operating temperatures and pressures, meaning the sets ended up each being 60,000 kW in size.

Surveying of the site had indicated that the site, some 95-acre (38 ha) in size, was of ample area for the scale of the new development. The site was partly made up of waste ground, having previously been used as an aircraft factory, and later as a cotton storage area by the Cotton Board. It also remained occupied by the low pressure Slacks Valley power station and its 132 kV transformer compound. It was found that suitable rail facilities for the new station were obtainable from the adjacent Caldervale Line. It was also found that effluent from the Oldham Corporation's Sewage Works could be used as make-up for the station's cooling towers. These factors helped in the station going ahead. The station was to be built in two phases, the first phases was granted consent in January 1950, and the second phase in September that year. The first set was commissioned in December 1953 and the second set September 1954.

Chadderton B Power Station was officially opened on 8 July 1955 by Councillor F. Kenyon, chairman of the North Western Electricity Consultative Council, and member of the North Western Electricity Board. The principal plant comprised:

- Seven pulverised fuel boilers (Simon-Carves) delivering 360,000 lb/hr (45.4 kg/s) of steam at 900 psi and 900 °F (62.1 bar and 482 °C),
- Four 60 MW Metropolitan-Vickers turbo-alternators (11.8 kV) with step-up transformers to 33 kV,
- Three cooling towers each 3.5 million gallons per hour (4.42 m^{3}/s).

=== Operations ===
The electricity output from Chadderton B power station was:

B station electricity sent out, GWh
Year	Station output, GWh	Thermal efficiency, %
1953/4	8.59	26.72
1954/5	543.52	26.91
1955/6	770.27	27.50
1956/7	555.23	27.09
1957/8	929.86	27.61
1960/1	1226.6	27.41
1961/2	1109.3	26.84
1962/3	1231.7	27.15
1966/7	1325.1	27.79
1971/2	893.96	25.47
1978/9	545.307	24.71
1981/2	109.128	21.57

In 1971 the 7 boilers at Chadderton’B’ had a combined steam generating capacity of 2.52 million pounds per hour (317.5 kg/s). The steam conditions were 900 psi (62.1 bar) and 482 °C. The station generated electricity using four turbo-alternators, each with a capacity of 63 megawatts (MW), giving the station a total generating capacity of 252 MW. The station was planned to use eight boilers, but only seven were ever installed.

The railway sidings that serviced the previous station were extended. Four locomotives worked the coal yard.

=== Closure and demolition ===
Structural changes to the National Grid made the power station redundant in 1982. It closed on 1 November 1982 with a generating capacity of 236 MW. The station and site were sold by the Central Electricity Generating Board in 1984, and demolished in April 1986. The station was demolished by MJ Finnigan & Co. Much of the site has been redeveloped with European Union and UK Government funding to become Oldham Broadway Business Park.

The electrical substation was left in place after the demolition of the main generating station but, because of the deteriorating concrete structure and poorly performing switchgear, it has been replaced by a £25million indoor gas insulated switchgear substation on the same site.

== See also ==
- Greenhill power station
