= Greenhill power station =

Former coal-fired power station in England

- Country: England
- Location: Oldham
- Coordinates: 53°32′21″N 02°06′22″W
- Status: Decommissioned and demolished
- Commission date: 1921
- Decommission date: 1960
- Owners: Oldham Corporation (1894–1948); British Electricity Authority (1948–1955); Central Electricity Authority (1955–1957); Central Electricity Generating Board (1958–1960)
- Operator: As owner

Thermal power station
- Primary fuel: Coal
- Turbine technology: Steam turbines
- Cooling towers: 5
- Cooling source: Circulating cooling water

Power generation
- Units operational: 2 x 6.6 MW, 1 x 4 MW
- Make and model: Metropolitan-Vickers
- Nameplate capacity: 17.2 MW
- Annual net output: 23.12 GWh (1946)

Greenhill power station supplied electricity to the town of Oldham, England and the surrounding area from 1921 to 1960. It replaced the older Rhodes Bank generating station and was superseded by Chadderton B power station. Greenhill power station was owned and operated by Oldham Corporation until the nationalisation of the British electricity supply industry in 1948. The power station was built over the period 1921–24 and was decommissioned in 1960.

== History ==
In 1890 Oldham Corporation applied for a provisional order under the Electric Lighting Acts to generate and supply electricity to the town. The Oldham Electric Lighting Order 1890 was granted by the Board of Trade and was confirmed by Parliament through the Electric Lighting Orders Confirmation (No. 3) Act 1890 (54 & 55 Vict. c. clxxxviii). The power station was built in Gas Street at Rhodes Bank (53°32'24"N 2°06'22"W) and first supplied electricity on 20 March 1894.

Following the First World War the demand for electricity was outpacing the available supply. Oldham Corporation built Greenhill power station adjacent to the railway in Churchill Street East (53°32′21″N 2°06′12″W). Greenhill station was first commissioned in 1921 with further generating sets commissioned in 1923 and 1924. In addition Oldham Corporation built another electricity generating station at Slacks Valley known as Chadderton power station which was first commissioned in November 1929.

== Equipment specification ==
=== Rhodes Bank plant 1898 ===
The original plant at Rhodes Bank power station comprised Willans engines and Charlesworth Hall and Siemens dynamos. To maintain supplies at times of peak demand Crompton-Howell and EPS accumulators were provided. Electricity supplies commenced on 20 March 1894. In 1898 the generating capacity was 657 kW and the maximum load was 413 kW. By 1898 9,330 yards (8,530 m) of electricity mains had been laid. In 1909 440kW of plant was moved to Greenhill and the station was closed down.

=== Greenhill plant 1923 ===
This station was opened in 1902 initially with a capacity of 3,700 kW.

In 1923 the generating plant at Greenhill power station comprised:

- Coal-fired boilers producing up to 383,500 lb/h (48.3 kg/s) of steam. Coal was delivered to the power station via a dedicated railway siding. Steam was supplied to:
- Generators:
  - 1 × 2,000 kW steam turbo-alternator
  - 2 × 3,000 kW steam turbo-alternators
  - 2 × 6,000 kW steam turbo-alternators

These machines gave a total output of 20,000 kW of alternating current.

By 1929 capacity had reached 32,000 kW.

A variety of electricity supplies were available to consumers:

- 3-phase, 50 Hz AC at 400 and 230 Volts
- Direct current 420 and 210 Volts
- Direct current Traction supply 500 Volts

=== Greenhill plant 1954–1958 ===
In 1954 the plant at Greenhill power station comprised:

- Boilers:
  - 3 × 25,000 lb/h (3.15 kg/s) Babcock & Wilcox boilers with chain grate stokers
  - 2 × 15,000 lb/h (1.9 kg/s) Babcock & Wilcox boilers with chain grate stokers
  - 4 × 10,000 lb/h (1.26 kg/s) Babcock & Wilcox boilers with chain grate stokers

The boilers had a total evaporative capacity of 145,000 lb/h (18.3 kg/s), steam conditions were 200 psi and 650 °F (13.8 bar, 343 °C), which was supplied to:

- Turbo-alternators:
  - 2 × 6.6 MW Metropolitan-Vickers turbo-alternators, generating at 6.6 kV
  - 1 × 4 MW Metropolitan-Vickers turbo-alternator, generating at 6.6 kV

The installed capacity was 17.2 MW with an output capacity of 10 MW.

There were also:

- 2 × 500 kW GEC motor generators
- 1 × 1.25 MW Westinghouse rotary convertor
- 3 × 1.5 MW Westinghouse rotary convertors

Condenser cooling water was cooled in five Premier chimney type cooling towers with a capacity of 1.36 million gallons per hour (1.7 m^{3}/s).

== Operations ==
=== Rhodes Bank operations 1898 ===
In 1898 and there were 213 customers supplied with a total of 305,859 kWh of electricity plus 16,444 kWh for public lighting. The sale of electricity provided revenue of £5,862 for Oldham Corporation against a generating cost of £1,486.

=== Greenhill operations 1921–23 ===
The operating data for the period 1921–23 was:

Greenhill power station operating data 1921–23
Electricity Use	Units	Year		
Electricity Use	Units	1921	1922	1923
Lighting and domestic	MWh	2,879	3,162	3,823
Public lighting	MWh	83	90	166
Traction	MWh	4,225	4,669	4,943
Power	MWh	11,153	14,325	20,901
Total use	MWh	18,340	22,246	29,832
Load and connected load
Maximum load	kW	10,996	14,187	16,260
Total connections	kW	16,555	19,985	21,387
Load factor	Per cent	24.3	22.0	25.7
Financial
Revenue from sales of current	£	–	166,875	29,833
Surplus of revenue over expenses	£	–	52,271	94,597

Under the terms of the Electricity (Supply) Act 1926 (16 & 17 Geo. 5. c. 51) the Central Electricity Board (CEB) was established in 1926. The CEB identified high efficiency 'selected' power stations that would supply electricity most effectively; Greenhill was designated a selected station. The CEB also constructed the National Grid (1927–33) to connect power stations within a region. Oldham Greenhill became part of one of the three grid rings in Lancashire. This local ring connected Oldham, Manchester, Tame Valley and Stockport.

=== Greenhill operations 1946 ===
Greenhill power station operating data for 1946 is given below, data for Chadderton power station is shown for comparison:

Greenhill and Chadderton power station operating data, 1946
Station	Load factor per cent	Max output load MW	Electricity supplied GWh	Thermal efficiency per cent
Greenhill	27.8	21,040	23.119	12.02
Chadderton	32.0	39,959	97,910	17.14

=== Nationalisation ===
The British electricity supply industry was nationalised in 1948 under the provisions of the Electricity Act 1947 (10 & 11 Geo. 6. c. 54). The Oldham electricity undertaking was abolished, ownership of Greenhill power station was vested in the British Electricity Authority, and subsequently the Central Electricity Authority and the Central Electricity Generating Board (CEGB). At the same time the electricity distribution and sales responsibilities of the Oldham electricity undertaking were transferred to the North Western Electricity Board (NORWEB).

=== Greenhill operations 1954–58 ===
Operating data for the period 1954–58 was:

Greenhill power station operating data, 1954–58
Year	Running hours	Max output capacity MW	Electricity supplied GWh	Thermal efficiency per cent
1954	2729	15	21.818	11.19
1955	2594	15	18.566	11.13
1956	1977	15	15.874	11.528
1957	2533	10	16.424	11.074
1958	2295	10	12.327	10.809

=== Oldham electricity supply district ===
The Oldham electricity supply district, covered an area of 29 square miles (75 square kilometres) and included the County Borough of Oldham, the borough of Middleton, and the districts of Chadderton, Crompton, Lees, and Royton. It served a population of 215,800 (1958). The number of consumers and electricity sold was:

Year	1956	1957	1958
Number of consumers	80,348	82,001	83,476
Electricity sold MWh	287,017	313,355	340,341

In 1958 the number of units sold to categories of consumers was:

Type of consumer	No. of consumers	Electricity sold MWh
Residential	74,909	92,706
Shops, offices, etc.	4,139	23,306
Combined premises	3,086	10,407
Factories	1,116	209,539
Farms	220	1,109
Public lighting	6	3,274
Total	83,476	340,341

There were 747 miles (1,202 km) of high voltage mains in the district comprising 728 miles (1,172 km) of underground mains and 19 miles (31 km) of overhead cables.

=== Closure ===
Greenhill power station was decommissioned in 1960. The buildings were subsequently demolished although a working substation remains on the site.

== See also ==
- Timeline of the UK electricity supply industry
- List of power stations in England
- Chadderton Power Station
