= Aberystwyth power station =

Electric power station

- Country: Wales
- Location: Aberystwyth
- Coordinates: 52°24′45″N 04°05′03″W
- Status: Decommissioned
- Commission date: 1895
- Owners: Bourne & Grant Electricity Supply Company Limited, and successors (1893–1936); Aberystwyth Corporation (1936–1948); British Electricity Authority (1948–1955); Central Electricity Authority (1955–1957); Central Electricity Generating Board (1958–1975)
- Operator: As owner

Thermal power station
- Primary fuel: Fuel oil

Power generation
- Units operational: 8 x Diesel engine sets
- Make and model: English Electric, General Motors
- Nameplate capacity: 4.92 kW
- Annual net output: 12.76 GWh (1956)

Aberystwyth power station supplied electricity to the town of Aberystwyth from 1895 to the 1970s. The oil-engine station was operated by a succession of private and public owners including Aberystwyth Corporation prior to the nationalisation of the electricity industry in 1948. The power station, with an ultimate capacity of 5 MW, was redeveloped as demand for electricity grew and old plant was replaced.

== History ==
In 1892 Aberystwyth Corporation applied for a provisional order under the Electric Lighting Acts to generate and supply electricity to the town. The Aberystwyth Electric Lighting Order 1892 was granted by the Board of Trade and was confirmed by Parliament through the Electric Lighting Orders Confirmation (No. 2) Act 1892 (55 & 56 Vict. c. xxxvii).

The following year the provisional order was transferred to the Bourne & Grant Electricity Supply Company Limited. The Company, which was registered 13 May 1893, built a power station in Mill Street, Aberystwyth (52°24′45″N 4°05′03″W) and first supplied electricity to the town in August 1895. The company was renamed the Aberystwyth and Chiswick Electric Supply Corporation Limited as the company also supplied electricity to the Chiswick district in west London, although the two systems were not interconnected. By 1904 the company name changed to the Chiswick Electric Supply Corporation Limited but it continued to develop electricity supplies in Aberystwyth.

The Central Electricity Board constructed the national grid (1927–33) to connect power stations within a region. However, Aberystwyth was remote from the grid and continued to run independently. The Chiswick Corporation noted that of all the fuel oil stations in the country of similar output the Aberystwyth station was ranked fourth in terms of thermal efficiency.

Aberystwyth Corporation took over the operation of the electricity undertaking in 1936. The corporation continued as the owner of the power station and supply system until nationalisation of the British electricity supply industry in 1948. The Aberystwyth electricity undertaking was abolished, ownership of Aberystwyth power station was vested in the British Electricity Authority, and subsequently the Central Electricity Authority and the Central Electricity Generating Board (CEGB). At the same time the electricity distribution and sales responsibilities of the Aberystwyth electricity undertaking were transferred to the Merseyside and North Wales Electricity Board (MANWEB).

== Equipment specification ==
The original plant at Aberystwyth power station comprised Browett-Lindley oil engines coupled by ropes and belts to Johnson & Phillips’ generators. In 1898 the maximum load was 74 kW.

=== Plant in 1923 ===
By 1923 the generating plant comprised:

Generators:

- 1 × 80 kW oil fired engine
- 1 × 100 kW oil fired engine
- 1 × 170 kW oil fired engine
- 1 × 120 kW steam driven reciprocating engine

These machines gave a total generating capacity of 470 kW of direct current.

Electricity supplies to consumers were at 440 & 220 Volt DC.

=== Plant in 1958 ===
The plant in 1958 comprised:

- 5 × English Electric diesel engine sets, totalling 2,670 kW (installed 1915 to 1948)
- 3 × 750 kW Brush / General Motors diesel engine sets (installed 1951–52)

The total installed generating capacity was 4.92 MW, with an output capacity of 5 MW.

== Operations ==
In 1897 the maximum electricity demand was 74 kW, and the station supplied 46,033 kWh.

=== Operating data 1921–23 ===
The operating data for the period 1921–23 was:

Aberystwyth power station operating data 1921–23
Electricity Use	Units	Year		
Electricity Use	Units	1921	1922	1923
Lighting and domestic	MWh	128.5	152.0	193.6
Public lighting	MWh	19.4	19.7	20.1
Traction	MWh	0	0	0
Power	MWh	31.5	49.6	59.0
Total use	MWh	179.4	221.3	272.6
Load and connected load
Maximum load	kW	174	230	251
Total connections	kW	880	987	1094
Load factor	Per cent	15.8	14.6	16.1
Financial
Revenue from sales of current	£	–	6,375	7,854
Surplus of revenue over expenses	£	–	2,964	4,021

=== Operating data 1946 ===
Aberystwyth power station operating data for 1946 was:

Aberystwyth power station operating data, 1946
Year	Load factor per cent	Max output load MW	Electricity supplied MWh	Thermal efficiency per cent
1946	32.2	1373	3,877	30.87

=== Operating data 1954–72 ===
Operating data for the period 1954–72 was:

Aberystwyth power station operating data, 1954–72
Year	Running hours or load factor (per cent)	Max output capacity MW	Electricity supplied MWh	Thermal efficiency per cent
1954	8760	4.92	11,036	25.6
1955	8760	4.92	12,413	28.8
1956	8760	4.92	12,760	29.5
1957	8760	4.92	11,745	27.3
1958	8760	4.92	12,231	28.4
1961	(21.8 %)	4.92	9,374	31.7
1962	(21.1 %)	4.92	9,089	32.81
1963	(17.98 %)	4.92	7,875	32.3
1967	(42.2 %)	2	8,234	32.60
1972	(21.2 %)	2.0	3,257	1.42

=== Aberystwyth Electricity Supply District ===
Aberystwyth was an electricity supply district in the Merseyside and North Wales Electricity Board. It supplied an area of 606 square miles (1570 km^{2}) and a population of 40,000. It comprised the Borough of Aberystwyth and the districts of Dolgelley, Machynlleth and Towyn. Electricity supplies were:

Year	Electricity sold MWh	No. of consumers
1956	21,287	–
1957	24,143	11,724
1958	27,470	12,396

== Closure ==
Aberystwyth power station was decommissioned in the 1970s.

== See also ==
- Timeline of the UK electricity supply industry
- List of power stations in Wales
