= Stafford power station =

- Country: England
- Location: Stafford
- Coordinates: 52°48′31″N 02°07′18″W
- Status: Decommissioned and demolished
- Construction began: 1891
- Commission date: 1895
- Decommission date: 1958
- Owners: Stafford Corporation (1894–1948); British Electricity Authority (1948–1955); Central Electricity Authority (1955–1957); Central Electricity Generating Board (1958)
- Operator: By owner

Thermal power station
- Primary fuel: Coal
- Turbine technology: Steam driven reciprocating engines and steam turbines
- Cooling towers: None
- Cooling source: River water

Power generation
- Units operational: 2 x 3.0 MW
- Make and model: English Electric 3.0 MW
- Units decommissioned: All
- Nameplate capacity: 6.0 MW
- Annual net output: 5,035 MWh (1946)

Stafford power station supplied electricity to the town of Stafford, England and the surrounding area from 1895 to 1958. It was initially owned and operated by Stafford Corporation, then by the North West Midlands Joint Electricity Authority prior to the nationalisation of the British electricity supply industry in 1948. The power station was redeveloped in the 1920s, but after 1935 it was a standby plant used at times of peak demand. Stafford power station was decommissioned in 1958.

== History ==
In 1890 Stafford Corporation applied for a provisional order under the Electric Lighting Acts to generate and supply electricity to the town. The Stafford Electric Lighting Order 1890 was granted by the Board of Trade and was confirmed by Parliament through the Electric Lighting Orders Confirmation (No. 8) Act 1890 (54 & 55 Vict. c. cxciii). The power station was built north of the corporation gas works near the River Sow (52°48′31″N 2°07′18″W) and first supplied electricity on 15 October 1895.

Stafford power station was bought by the North West Midlands Joint Electricity Authority in April 1930, and was operated under the direction of the Central Electricity Board from 1 April 1934. From 1935 it was used as a standby station.

== Equipment specification ==
The original plant at Stafford power station comprised Marshall compound engines coupled by ropes to Elwell-Parker dynamos. In 1898 the generating capacity was 198 kW and the maximum load was 80 kW, there were 6,200 lamps on the circuits.

=== Plant 1923 ===
By 1923 the generating plant comprised:

- Coal-fired boilers generating up to 62,000 lb/h (7.8 kg/s) of steam which was supplied to:
- Generators:
  - 1 × 150 kW reciprocating engine driving a generator
  - 1 × 220 kW reciprocating engine driving a generator
  - 1 × 500 kW reciprocating engine driving a generator
  - 1 × 500 kW steam turbo-generator
  - 1 × 1,000 kW steam turbo-alternator
  - 1 × 1,600 kW steam turbo-alternator

These machines gave a total generating capacity of 2,600 kW of alternating current and 1,370 kW of direct current.

A variety of electricity supplies were available to consumers:

- 3-phase, 50 Hz AC at 6,000 Volts, 400 and 230 Volts.
- 420 & 210 Volts DC.

=== New plant 1925 & 1927 ===
New plant was commissioned in 1925 and 1927.

- Boilers:
  - 1 × Stirling boiler 12,000 lb/h (1.5 kg/s)
  - 1 × Stirling boiler 15,000 lb/h (1.9 kg/s)
  - 2 × Stirling boilers 20,000 lb/h (2.5 kg/s)
  - 1 × Stirling boiler 40,000 lb/h (5.0 kg/s)

The total evaporative capacity of the boilers was 107,000 lb/hr (13.5 kg/s).

Steam conditions were 180 psi and 525 °F (12.4 bar, 274 °C), and 200 psi at 550 & 590 °F (13.8 bar at 288 & 310 °C) , steam was supplied to:

- Turbo-alternators:
  - 2 × English Electric 3.0 MW turbo-alternator, generating at 6.6 kV.

Condenser cooling water was drawn from the River Sow.

== Operations ==
=== Operating data 1898 ===
In 1898 82,172 kWh was sold to 90 consumers, plus 41,729 kWh for public lamps.

=== Operating data 1921–23 ===
The operating data for the period 1921–23 is shown in the table:

Stafford power station operating data 1921–23
Electricity Use	Units	Year		
Electricity Use	Units	1921	1922	1923
Lighting and domestic use	MWh	221	254	339
Public lighting use	MWh	15	15	22
Traction	MWh	0	0	0
Power use	MWh	1557	1319	2716
Total use	MWh	1793	1588	3077
Load and connected load
Maximum load	kW	806	1200	2200
Total connections	kW	2000	4800	5400
Load factor	Per cent	31.9	19.1	19.0
Financial
Revenue from sales of current	£	–	19,113	26,186
Surplus of revenue over expenses	£	–	5,521	14,375

=== Operating data 1934–36 ===
Under the terms of the Electricity (Supply) Act 1926 (16 & 17 Geo. 5 c. 51) the Central Electricity Board (CEB) was established in 1926. The CEB identified high efficiency ‘selected’ power stations that would supply electricity most effectively. Stafford power station was operated under the direction of the CEB from 1934. The CEB also constructed the national grid (1927–33) to connect power stations within a region. The operating data for 1934-36 was:

Stafford power station operating data 1934–36
Operating data	1934–35	1935–36
Plant capacity kW	9,100	9,100
Maximum demand kW	2,500	5,550
Load factor %	5.67	0.67
Units generated kWh	2,507,108	328,089
Units imported kWh	12,717	15,468
Units exported kWh	17,441	245

=== Operating data 1946 ===
In 1946 Stafford power station sent out 5,035 MWh of electricity, the maximum load was 7432 kW.

The British electricity supply industry was nationalised in 1948 under the provisions of the Electricity Act 1947 (10-11 Geo. 6 c. 54). The Stafford electricity undertaking was abolished, ownership of Stafford power station was vested in the British Electricity Authority, and subsequently the Central Electricity Authority and the Central Electricity Generating Board (CEGB). At the same time the electricity distribution and sales responsibilities of the Stafford electricity undertaking were transferred to the Midlands Electricity Board (MEB).

=== Operating data 1947–58 ===
Operating data for the period 1947–58 is shown in the table:

Stafford power station operating data, 1947–58
Year	Running hours	Max output capacity MW	Electricity supplied GWh	Thermal efficiency per cent
1947		7.6	7.609	9.84
1948	2049	6	5.899	9.00
1950	1621	6	1.771	7.93
1954	942	6	3.191	8.19
1955	1357	6	4.264	8.93
1956	953	6	2.835	8.42
1957	289	6	0.815	6.46
1958	43	6	–	–

== Closure ==
Stafford power station was decommissioned in 1958. The buildings were demolished and the area has been redeveloped with commercial facilities.

== See also ==
- Timeline of the UK electricity supply industry
- List of power stations in England
