= Bath power station =

Former power station in England

- Country: United Kingdom
- Location: Bath, Bath and North-East Somerset
- Coordinates: 51°22′40″N 02°21′32″W
- Status: Decommissioned and demolished
- Commission date: 24 June 1890
- Decommission date: late-1960s
- Owners: Bath Electric Lighting and Engineering Company Limited (1890–1897); Bath Corporation (1897–1948); British Electricity Authority (1948–1955); Central Electricity Authority (1955–1957); Central Electricity Generating Board (1958–1970)
- Operator: As owners

Thermal power station
- Primary fuel: Coal
- Secondary fuel: Fuel oil
- Tertiary fuel: Diesel
- Cooling towers: None
- Cooling source: River water

Power generation
- Units operational: 2 x 1.5 MW, 1 x 3 MW, 2 x 7 MW
- Make and model: Brush-Ljungstrom
- Nameplate capacity: 16 MW
- Annual net output: 25.5 GWh (1955)

Bath power station supplied electricity to the City of Bath and the wider area from 1890. The station was originally built and operated by the City of Bath Electric Lighting and Engineering Company Limited. The power station was on a site in Dorchester Street adjacent to the Old Bridge over the River Avon. The City of Bath Corporation assumed ownership in 1897. The power station was redeveloped several times: including a major rebuilding with new equipment in the 1920s. The station was closed in the late 1960s and was subsequently demolished.

== History ==
Bath City Council had applied in October 1882 for a provisional order under the Electric Lighting Act 1882 (45 & 46 Vict. c. 56) to supply electric lighting to the city. However, it rescinded the application in December 1882 having decided not to proceed with the scheme.

In 1889 the City of Bath Electric Lighting and Engineering Company Limited was founded to provide electric lighting. This included 81 public arc lights and private lighting. The company built Bath power station 51°22′40″N 2°21′32″W) on Dorchester Street north east of the Old Bridge. It first supplied electricity on 24 June 1890.

In 1896 Bath Corporation applied for a Provisional Order under the Electric Lighting Acts to generate and supply electricity to the town. This was granted by the Board of Trade and was confirmed by Parliament through the Electric Lighting Orders (No. 7) Act 1896 (59 & 60 Vict. c. clxxv). The Bath Corporation acquired the company undertaking on 7 January 1897 at a price of £24,533.

== Equipment specification ==
The original plant at Bath power station comprised four Babcock and Wilcox boilers, eight vertical Brush compound engines coupled by ropes to Mordey dynamos; and ECC alternators driven by Polliitt and Wizzell engines. In 1898 the generating capacity was 900 kW and the maximum load was 375 kW. There were about 14,000 lamps of 8 candle power.

In 1911 the Corporation installed a Diesel engine and generator with an output of 450 kW. The cost off the generator and ancillaries was £7,500.

=== First World War and post-war plant ===
Following the First World War new plant was installed to meet growing demand for electricity. By 1923 the plant comprised:

- Coal-fired boilers generating a maximum of 54,000 lb/h (6.8 kg/s) of steam, these supplied steam to:
- Generators
  - 1 × 200 kW reciprocating engine (DC)
  - 2 × 250 kW reciprocating engines (DC)
  - 1 × 500 kW reciprocating engine (DC)
  - 2 × 350 kW reciprocating engines (AC)
  - 1 × 1,500 kW steam turbine (AC)

These gave a total generating capacity of 1,200 kW of Direct Current, and 2,200 kW of Alternating Current.

Electricity supplies were available to consumers as 220 and 440 Volts DC; single phase, 100 Hz AC at 110 Volts.

=== New plant 1921–1930 ===
New plant was commissioned in 1921–1930.

- Boilers
  - 1 × Clayton water tube oil fired 20,000 lb/h (2.52 kg/s), steam conditions 210 psi and 625 °F (14.5 bar, 329 °C),
  - 3 × Babcock and Wilcox water tube 40,000 lb/h (5.04 kg/s), steam conditions 210 psi and 625 °F (14.5 bar, 329 °C),
  - 1 × Thompson 60,000 lb/h (7.6 kg/s), steam conditions 210 psi and 700 °F (14.5 bar, 371 °C).

The boilers had a total evaporative capacity of 200,000 lb/h (25.2 kg/s), and supplied steam to:

- Turbo-alternators:
  - 2 × 1.5 MW Brush-Ljungstrom, 6.6 kV
  - 1 × 3 MW Brush-Ljungstrom, 6.6 kV, installed in 1924.
  - 2 × 7 MW Brush-Ljungstrom, 6.6 kV, installed in 1926 and 1930.

The completed total installed generating capacity was 20 MW, with an output capacity 16 MW.

Condenser cooling water was drawn from the River Avon.

== Operations ==
In 1898 maximum electricity demand was 375 kW.

In 1909 the City Council sought a variation to its Order of 1896 to extend the area of supply to include Bath Rural District, within 3 miles of the Guildhall. The order was confirmed in 1910, and sanctioned by Parliament by the Electric Lighting Order Confirmation (No.4) Act, 1910 (10 Edw. 7 & 1 Geo. 5 c. lxxviii).

In 1921 the City Council examined the possibility of using hydro power to generate electricity. The chairman of the electricity committee and the city engineer visited Chester where a scheme was in operation. However, it was decided not to proceed with such a scheme in Bath.

=== Operating data 1921–23 ===
The operating data for the period 1921–23 is shown in the table:

Bath power station operating data 1921–23
Electricity Use	Units	Year		
Electricity Use	Units	1921	1922	1923
Lighting and domestic use	MWh	829	873	1,070
Public lighting use	MWh	311	391	412
Power use	MWh	1,536	1,407	1,464
Total use	MWh	2,676	2,670	2,947
Load and connected load
Maximum load	kW	1,748	1,754	1,910
Total connections	kW	6,056	6,371	7,042
Load factor	Per cent	20.8	21.2	23.1
Financial
Revenue from sales of current	£	–	45,726	48,825
Surplus of revenue over expenses	£	–	10,898	26,445

=== Operating data 1946 ===
Bath power station operating data, 1946.

Year	Load factor per cent	Max output load MW	Electricity supplied GWh	Thermal efficiency per cent
1946	16.8	16.3	23.720	12.82

Under the terms of the Electricity (Supply) Act 1926 (16-17 Geo. 5 c. 51) the Central Electricity Board (CEB) was established in 1926. The CEB identified high efficiency ‘selected’ power station that would supply electricity most effectively; Bath was designated a selected station. The CEB also constructed the national grid (1927–33) to connect power stations within a region. The Bath undertaking was part of the South-West England and South Wales Electricity scheme. In the first quarter of 1935 the Corporation sold to the CEB over 6 MWh of electricity and purchased from the CEB over 11 MWh. Over the period 1935 to 1948 the Corporation sold to the CEB an average of 28 GWh a year and purchased from the CEB an average of 103 GWh a year.

Upon nationalisation of the British electricity supply industry in 1948 under the provisions of the Electricity Act 1947 (10-11 Geo. 6 c. 54) the Bath electricity undertaking was abolished, ownership of Bath power station was vested in the British Electricity Authority, and subsequently the Central Electricity Authority and the Central Electricity Generating Board (CEGB). At the same time the electricity distribution and sales responsibilities of the Bath electricity undertaking were transferred to the South Western Electricity Board (SWEB).

In 1948 the Bath Corporation had 23,108 consumers and supplied electricity to an area of 25.41 square miles (65.8 km^{2}).

=== Operating data 1954–63 ===
Operating data for the period 1954–63 is shown in the table:

Bath power station operating data, 1954–63
Year	Running hours (load factor per cent)	Max output capacity MW	Electricity supplied GWh	Thermal efficiency per cent
1954	3050	16	25.162	11.99
1955	3334	16	25.499	11.67
1956	3179	16	24.821	11.83
1957	3024	16	20.971	12.45
1958	2446	16	15.426	12.21
1959	1111	16	8.662	11.27
1961	(4.4 %)	16	6.10	10.62
1962	(3.1 %)	16	4.362	12.57
1963	(7.54 %)	16	10.564	12.17

In 1958 the Bath electricity district supplied an area of 214 square miles and a population of 148,800. The amount of electricity sold and the number and types of consumers was as follows:

Year	Electricity sold, GWh	No. of consumers
1955	138.9	45,647
1956	156.7	47,092
1957	165.4	48,512
1958	175.7	49,929

In 1958 the above totals were made up of the following:

Type of Consumer	No. of consumers	Electricity sold, GWh
Residential	43,004	91.5
Shops, offices, etc.	5,298	30.2
Factories	656	46.5
Farms	950	5.9
Public lighting	21	1.6
Total	175.7	175.7

== Closure ==
Bath power station was decommissioned in the late 1960s. The buildings subsequently demolished and the area has been redeveloped.

== See also ==
- Timeline of the UK electricity supply industry
- List of power stations in England
