= Meaford Power Station =

Coal-fired power station in Staffordshire

- Country: England
- Location: Staffordshire, West Midlands
- Coordinates: 52.9257°N 2.1665°W
- Construction began: 1945 (Meaford A); 1951 (Meaford B)
- Commission date: 20 October 1947 (Meaford A); 4 October 1957 (Meaford B)
- Decommission date: 1974 (Meaford A); 1990 (Meaford B)
- Operators: North West Midlands Joint Electricity Authority (1947–1948); British Electricity Authority (1948–1955); Central Electricity Authority (1955–1957); Central Electricity Generating Board (1958–1990); National Power (1990)

Thermal power station
- Primary fuel: Coal

Meaford Power Station was a coal-fired power station situated on the River Trent at Meaford near Stone in Staffordshire. It was the first new power station to be commissioned after World War II.

== History ==
=== Meaford A ===
In June 1919, it was proposed that a 'joint power station' should be established in the Trentham or Barlaston areas to supply all of North Staffordshire.

The North West Midlands Joint Electricity Authority (NWMJEA) was established in 1928 under the Electricity (Supply) Act 1919 (9 & 10 Geo. 5. c. 100), taking over the existing power stations in Stoke-on-Trent and Stafford.

Before the Meaford site was selected, in 1939 the North West Midlands Joint Electricity Authority considered a site further north, opposite Hem Heath Colliery, in Newstead, Stoke-on-Trent. The Joint Electricity Authority required a site for a 60MW power station near Stoke (as it was the largest consumer of electricity in the area), and where a supply of 1.5 million gallons of water a day could be obtained. The River Trent itself was too polluted, but suitably clean water could be obtained from the Stoke sewage works at Strongford, near Barlaston.

On 2 March 1939, the NWMJEA decided to construct a power station at Meaford, and after an enquiry in July 1939 an inquiry by the Electricity Commissioners agreed to the development and a Special Order was issued by the then Minister of Power to acquire the site in November 1941.

After delays caused by the Second World War, the North West Midlands Joint Electricity Authority began work on Meaford Power Station in February 1945, with the structure being built by Dorman Long. On July 17, 1945, the foundation stone of the main building was laid by Major Gwilym Lloyd George, then Minister of Fuel and Power and two years and three months later, in spite of the difficulties imposed by an unusually wet summer followed by the severe winter of 1946 / 47, the station was officially opened by Mr. Emanuel Shinwell on October 28, 1947.

The station was known as Meaford A power station even before the B station was built, as the proposal was always for two phases of construction. It had a generating capacity of 120 megawatts (MW), comprising four 30 MW GEC turbo-alternators, fed by six pulverised fuel Babcock and Wilcox high-head boilers of 240,000 lb/hr. It had two brick 350 ft (110 m) tall chimneys, one at either end of the station, and two 250 ft (76 m) tall concrete cooling towers. The generating capacity, electricity production and thermal efficiency are shown in the table.

Meaford A electricity capacity and output
Year	1954	1955	1956	1957	1958	1961	1962	1963	1967	1971
Installed capacity, MW	112	112	112	112	112	120	120	120	120	120
Electricity output, GWh	826.82	841.39	803.58	759.69	577.01	494.6	444.1	439.1	405.6	397.20
Thermal efficiency, %	25.95	25.83	25.76	25.45	24.73	24.53	23.61	23.39	24.00	19.42

Generation ceased in 1974, and the boiler house, turbine hall and both chimneys were demolished by 1982. However its two cooling towers remained in service until 28 September 1990 before subsequent demolition in 1991 on the same day as the three of Meaford 'B'. Station office block and some workshops remained for many years after before demolition.

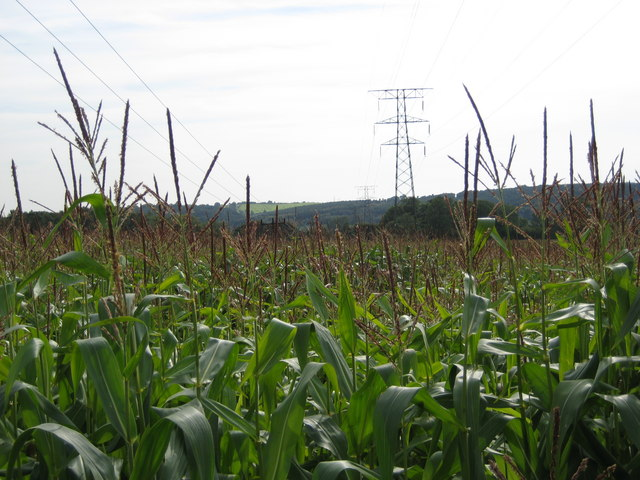
Powerlines stretch across the fields towards the site of the former Meaford Power Station.

=== Meaford B ===
Meaford B power station was located to the south of A station. The station was built using numerous main and sub-contractors to include G. Percy Trentham (excavations, roads, railway sidings, superstructure etc.), Cleveland Bridge & Engineering Company (station steel frame), P.C. Richardson & Co. (chimney), Babcock & Wilcox (boiler plant), British Thomson-Houston (turbo-alternators) and many contractors.

Construction work on it began in 1951, with completion and formal opening on 4 October 1957. It was of 240 MW generating capacity, comprising four 60 MW British Thomson-Houston turbo alternators. These were initially rated at 65 MW, but later at 60 MW. Steam was provided by four Babcock & Wilcox boilers. These fed steam at 515,000 lbs per hour, with a steam temperature of 1,065 °F (566 °C) and 1,500 psi operating pressure. The station was built on the 'unit' or 'set' principle where one boiler fed one turbo alternator. It had one centrally placed, brick built chimney, which stood at 408 ft (124 m) tall. System water was cooled by three 250 ft (76 m) tall cooling towers and after Meaford A had been decommissioned, all five cooling towers. The station was of brick cladding construction over a steel frame, which supported the four boilers from the roof. Its design efficiency was 31.41%.

The station was initially operated by the Central Electricity Authority which three months after the formal opening became the Central Electricity Generating Board (CEGB) on 1 January 1958, and the 'B' station was quite an efficient station for much of its life, and won a number of trophies within the board. Investment continued in the late 1980s, principally to reduce smoke and sulphur emissions. With the cessation of the CEGB as an entity on 31 March 1990, the B station was allocated to National Power – the larger of the two conventional power companies formed from the CEGB at privatisation. Generation continued through 1990, until late September that year, when it was announced that B station was to close imminently: i.e. when the coal in the bunkers on the station had run out. This occurred with the tripping of No.2 unit at 13.00 hrs on 28 September 1990.

The generating capacity, electricity production and thermal efficiency are shown in the table.

Meaford B electricity capacity and output
Year	1957	1958	1960	1961	1962	1963	1967	1971	1979	1981	1982
Installed capacity, MW	112	224	244	240	250	260	240	240	240	224	224
Electricity output, GWh	479.48	963.46	1764.15	1405.11	1481.8	1350.7	1238.08	832.78	834.3	859.85	568.07
Thermal efficiency, %	29.00	30.02	30.33	30.12	29.73	29.20	29.13	27.17	20.95	26.98	27.52

Annual output of Meaford B in GWh

The five cooling towers were demolished in September 1991, followed by formal closure of the station on 1 October 1991. Demolition of the station then commenced, and was completed on 9 June 1996 with the felling of the chimney, which made the national television news that day.

Two steam railway locomotives and two diesel railway locomotives are preserved at heritage railways in Northern England and the Midlands (Foxfield Light Railway).

The site is largely empty as of October 2020 apart from two operational 132kV substations (Barlaston & Meaford 'C') for Western Power Distribution, though some 'A' station buildings were occupied for business use, these have now been vacated and the buildings have now fallen into complete disrepair. The site is monitored 24/7 remotely using CCTV and motion detection systems.

A new company Meaford Energy Limited (MEL) has now submitted a DCO Application for the Meaford Energy Centre (MEC), a new combined cycle gas turbine (CCGT) power station and its integral gas and electricity connections to be built on part of the site of the old power stations. The new power station is proposed to have a generating capacity of up to 299MWe. Meaford Energy Limited (MEL) is a joint venture between Glenfinnan and St. Modwen – the owners of the site.
