= Market Drayton Electric Light and Power Company =

Power company in Shropshire, England

- Type: Public limited company
- Industry: Electricity supply
- Founded: 4 February 1902
- Defunct: 31 March 1948
- Fate: Nationalization
- Successor: British Electricity Authority and the Midland Electricity Board.
- Headquarters: Market Drayton, Shropshire
- Key people: R. C. Donaldson-Hudson (chairman), C. W. Clifford and A. E. Wycherley (1915)
- Products: Electricity generation and supply
- Revenue: see text

The Market Drayton Electric Light and Power Company Limited was established in 1902 to provide electricity to Market Drayton, Shropshire, England and the surrounding area. It was abolished upon nationalization of the British electricity supply industry in 1948.

== Background ==
The Market Drayton Electric Light and Power Company Limited was registered on 4 February 1902. Its legal powers were derived from the Drayton-in-Hales Electric Lighting Order 1903. The company's offices were in Cheshire Street, Market Drayton and the power station was in Great Hales Street, Market Drayton (52°54′10.1″N 2°28′51.6″W). In 1915 the directors were R. C. Donaldson-Hudson (chairman), C. W. Clifford and A. E. Wycherley.

== Electricity generation and supply ==
In 1915 electricity was produced by two 90 kW Belliss-Parker 2-pole generators. Batteries of 360 Amp-Hours capacity maintained supplies of current. There was a three-wire Direct Current system operating at 480-240 Volts. The maximum load on the system was 81.5 kW. The company had 240 consumers and 41 shareholders.

Operating parameters are summarised in the table.

Operating parameters 1908-12
Year	Electricity sold MWh	Revenue £	Working costs £
1908	57.22	1,218	802
1909	57.26	1,198	791
1910	59.05	1,234	839
1911	60.47	1,247	914
1912	64.60	1,282	785

In 1923 the plant comprised:

- Boilers: producing a total of 6900 lb/hr (0.87 kg/s) of steam
- Generators:
  - 2 × 45 kW reciprocating engines
  - 1 × 80 kW reciprocating engine
  - 1 x 90 kW reciprocating engine

The amount of electricity sold was 145.38 MWh. The maximum load on the system was 124 kW. There were 1,037 connections on the system. The population of the area of the area of supply was 4,700. The surplus of revenue over costs was £2,840.

In 1937 the plant comprised a single 88 kW oil engine. This generated 20.31 MWh that year. The maximum load on the system was 392 kW. There were 2,293 connections on the system and 1,080 consumers. The population of the area of the area of supply was 5,000.

The company now purchased the majority of its electricity in bulk from the North West Midlands Joint Electricity Authority. In 1937 this amounted to 822.7 MWh. There was an operating surplus in 1923 of £3,710.

In 1950 the plant comprised a 132-horsepower (98.4 kW) diesel engine driving an 88 kW 500 Volt generator. The electricity supplied is shown in the table.

Year	Electricity supplied MWh
1946	0.175
1947	2.29
1948	36.46
1950	31.00

== Abolition ==
The Market Drayton Electric Light and Power Company was abolished on 31 March 1948 under the provisions of the Electricity Act 1947 which nationalized the electricity supply industry. The generating plant was vested in the British Electricity Authority and the distribution infrastructure in the Midlands Electricity Board (North Staffordshire sub-area).

Generation of electricity at the Market Drayton site ceased in about 1954.

== See also ==
- List of pre-nationalisation UK electric power companies
