= Castle Meads Power Station =

Former coal-fired power station in Gloucestershire, England

- Country: England
- Location: Gloucestershire, South West England
- Coordinates: 51.8674°N 2.2584°W
- Status: Decommissioned and demolished
- Commission date: 1943
- Decommission date: 1973
- Owners: Corporation of Gloucester (1943–1948); British Electricity Authority (1948–1955); Central Electricity Authority (1955–1957); Central Electricity Generating Board (1958–1973)
- Operator: As owner

Thermal power station
- Primary fuel: Coal
- Turbine technology: Steam raising
- Chimneys: 1
- Cooling towers: None
- Cooling source: River water

Power generation
- Units operational: 40.075 MW
- Units decommissioned: All
- Annual net output: 82.1 GWh (1971–72)

Castle Meads Power Station was a coal-fired power station situated on Alney Island in the River Severn at Gloucester.

== History ==
Construction of the station began in 1940, and it was opened in December 1942. It was built to replace the electricity supply from Gloucester Corporation's works on Commercial Road. Castle Meads was one of two 'war emergency' stations intended to spread the risk due to war damage. The other station was at Earley near Reading. Castle Meads comprised two 20 MW British Thomson-Houston turbo-alternator sets, the first was commissioned in December 1942 just two years after work started on the site the second set in July 1944. These were powered by steam from five Yarrow boilers each producing 100,000 pounds per hour (12.6 kg/s) of steam at 425 psi and 825 °F (29.3 bar and 441 °C). There was also a 75 kW diesel engine set. When the electricity industry was nationalised in 1948 and the passed to the British Electricity Authority and later the Central Electricity Generating Board.

Coal brought to the station by rail on the Great Western Railway's Docks branch from Over, and by barge. Once at the station, coal was transported toward the boilers by a fireless locomotive, one of only 162 ever built in Britain. It was built by Andrew Barclays of Kilmarnock in 1942, carrying the works number 2126. After the closure of the power station, the locomotive was preserved at the Gloucester Waterways Museum. The capacity and output of the station was:

Castle Meads capacity and Output
Year	1946	1954	1955	1956	1957	1958	1961	1962	1963	1967	1972
Capacity MW		38	38	38	38	38	40.075	40.075	40.075	40	40
Output GWh	151.9	156.309	119.396	148.451	127.017	122.109	96.43	105.91	95.595	122.3	82.083

The station used river water for condensing the steam and for cooling.

The station closed in March 1976. The station was demolished for charity in 1978 by Gloucester Round Table.

Gloucester Corporation Electricity Works

This station was located on the opposite side of the river Severn to the Castle Meads site and was erected in 1899. Initially two sets were installed:

- One triple expansion Bellis engine directly coupled to a pair of Silvertown dynamos delivering 800 kW.
- One due cylinder Bellis engine driving a pair of Silvertown dynamos delivering 150 kW

Steam is provided from three Yates and Thom Lancashire boilers each with evaporating capacity of 6,000lbs. steam per hour.

Even before the works were completed the station was extended. An additional Tinkers Lancashire boiler capable of evaporating 8,000 lbs/hr of water per hour fitted with Proctor’s mechanical stokers. This fed a 500 HP Willans triple expansion engine driving two Mather and Platt 150 kW dynamos.
