= East Midlands Electricity =

Former British electricity board

- Company type: Private (from 1990)
- Industry: Electricity distribution
- Founded: 1947; 79 years ago
- Defunct: 10 December 1993
- Fate: Purchased by Powergen
- Successor: Central Networks East
- Headquarters: 398 Coppice Road, Arnold, Nottingham; NG5 7HX, England, United Kingdom
- Area served: East Midlands
- Products: Electricity supply
- Parent: Powergen (from 1998)

The East Midlands Electricity Board (EMEB) was formed in 1947 as one of the United Kingdom's twelve area electricity boards specified under the Electricity Act 1947. In 1990 it was floated on the stock market as East Midlands Electricity plc, which went through several changes of ownership.

== Supply area ==
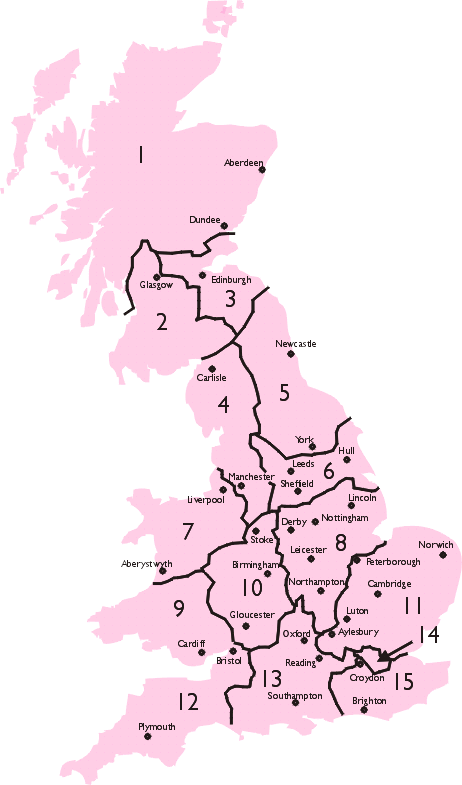
UK supply areas

The board covered a large area: from Chesterfield in Derbyshire, to Newport Pagnell (near modern-day Milton Keynes), in Buckinghamshire, and from Coventry in the west to Skegness in the east.

== Structure ==
The organisation's headquarters were at Mapperley Hall in Mapperley Park, Nottingham in the 1960s, then on Coppice Road in Arnold, a suburb of the city.

The board was responsible for the purchase of electricity from the electricity generator (British Electricity Authority (1948–1955), Central Electricity Authority (1955–1957), Central Electricity Generating Board from 1958) and its distribution and sale of electricity to customers.

The key people on the board were: Chairman A.N. Todd (1964) A. H. Kenyon (1967), Deputy Chairman A. H. Kenyon (1964) P. Sydney (1967), full-time members J. A. MacKerrell (1964, 1967) R. A. York (1967).

== History ==
The board was required to supply electricity to homes and businesses, as regulated by the Act, and under terms of reference from the Electricity Council and the CEGB. In many towns, the board opened showrooms, to provide customer service facilities such as paying bills, as well as demonstrating and supplying the latest electrical goods to customers. The total number of customers supplied by the Board was:

EMEB customers 1949–89
Year	1948/9	1960/1	1965/6	1970/1	1975/6	1978/9	1980/1	1985/6	1987/8	1988/9
No. of Customers, 1000s	893	1364	1512	1651	1782	1873	1920	2032	2086	2115

The post-war period one of fast growth for the electricity industry. The pre-war National Grid system vastly expanded, and many new power stations were opened across the region. One major customer British Rail: when the West Coast Main Line electrified in the 1960s, and the East Coast Main Line in the 1980s, the electricity boards were required to supply the lines passing through their territory with electricity direct from the National Grid.

Electricity, in GWh, sold by East Midlands Electricity Board

=== Existing electricity suppliers taken over at nationalisation ===
The Electricity (Allocation of Undertakings to Area Boards) Order 1948 (SI 1948/484) transferred the electricity business of the following local authorities and private companies to the new board effective 31 March 1948.

==== Local authorities ====
- Ashbourne Urban District Council
- Bolsover Urban District Council
- Burton-upon-Trent Corporation
- Chesterfield Corporation
- Coventry Corporation
- Derby Corporation
- Kast Retford Corporation
- Kettering Corporation
- Leicester Corporation
- Lincoln Corporation
- Long Eaton Urban District Council
- Loughborough Corporation
- Mansfield Corporation
- Newark Corporation
- Nottingham Corporation
- Nuneaton Corporation
- Rugby Corporation
- Sleaford Urban District Council
- Spalding Urban District Council
- Uttoxeter Urban District Council
- Worksop Corporation

==== Private companies ====
- Boston and District Electric Supply Company
- Derbyshire and Nottinghamshire Electric Power Company
- Leicestershire and Warwickshire Electric Power Company
- Melton Mowbray Electric Light Company
- Midland Electric Light and Power Company
- Mid Lincolnshire Electric Supply Company
- Northampton Electric Light and Power Company
- Oakham Gas and Electricity Company
- Rushden and District Electric Supply Company
- Tamworth District Electric Supply Company
- Urban Electric Supply Company
- Wellingborough Electric Supply Company

== Privatisation ==
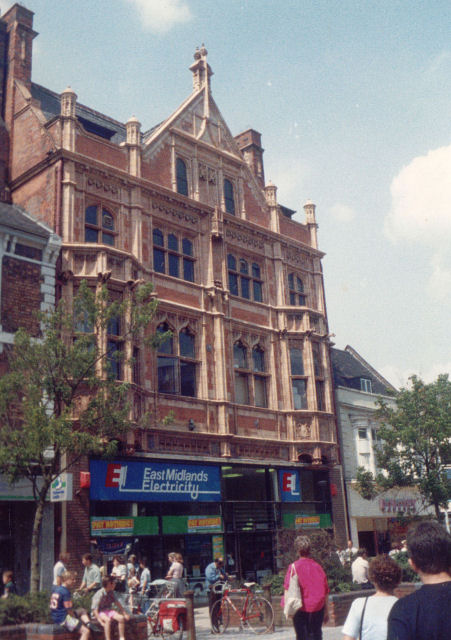
East Midlands Electricity shop in Lincoln High Street in May 1990

In 1987, the Conservatives’ election manifesto committed the party to further privatisation of nationalised industries, and the electricity industry was to be one of these. In March 1990, the board became East Midlands Electricity plc, a new regional electricity company. In December 1990 it floated on the stock market. Although operations continued as usual for a few years, the business began to be separated and broken up. The electricity showroom and sales business merged with those of other companies into the Powerhouse chain, in 1994/5. In November 1995, the company split into three divisions of distribution, metering and supply. The company was bought by Dominion Resources for £1.3bn in December 1996. In September 1998, EME's distribution and supply business was bought by Powergen for £1.9bn, ensuring the business remained vertically integrated. The EME brand was not replaced until 1999, although the distribution business continued under the EME brand until it merged with Central Networks in 2004.

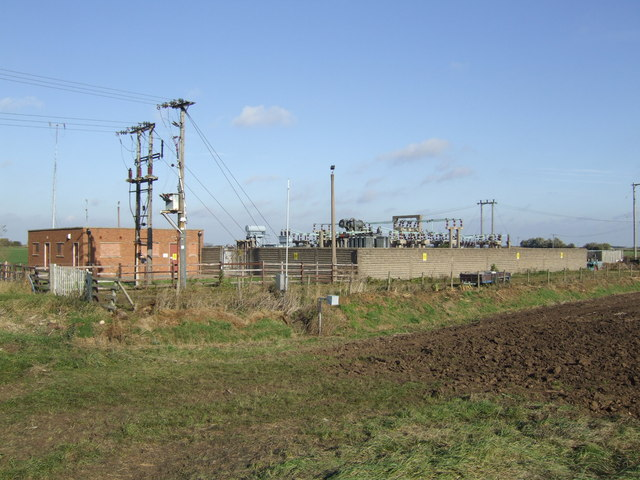
EMEB substation built in 1963 in Crowland

== See also ==
- E.ON UK (formerly Powergen)
- Public electricity supplier
