= Francis Tombs, Baron Tombs =

British peer (1924–2020)

The Right Honourable The Lord Tombs
- Tombs's last parliamentary speech, 2014

Member of the House of Lords
- Lord Temporal
- Life peerage 28 February 1990 – 31 March 2015

Personal details
- Born: 17 May 1924
- Died: 11 April 2020 (aged 95)

Francis Leonard Tombs, Baron Tombs (17 May 1924 – 11 April 2020) was an English industrialist and politician who served as a crossbench member of the House of Lords from 1990 until his retirement in 2015.

== Background ==
Tombs was born to a Catholic family in Walsall in 1924, one of three sons born to Joseph and Jane (née Bouncer) Tombs. He was educated at Elmore Green School, Walsall, and at the University of London. He worked for the General Electric Company from 1944 to 1946.

== Career ==
Tombs had a career in industry, particularly in electricity generation. He was chairman of the South of Scotland Electricity Board, the Electricity Council and Rolls-Royce. Tombs was president of the Institution of Electrical Engineers in 1981 and became an Honorary Fellow of its successor organisation the Institution of Engineering and Technology in 1991. Tombs was named chairman of Turner & Newall P.L.C., Britain's largest manufacturer of asbestos products on 30 November 1982, and remained there throughout much of the 1980s.

Knighted in 1978, Tombs was created a life peer on 28 February 1990, as Baron Tombs, of Brailes in the County of Warwickshire. He sat in the House of Lords as a crossbencher, and was on a number of committees. Tombs was granted a leave of absence in March 2008, which lasted until July 2010. He wrote a memoir, Power Politics: Political Encounters in Industry and Engineering, which was published later that year. Tombs retired from the House of Lords on 31 March 2015.

== Personal life and death ==
In 1949, Tombs married Marjorie Evans; they had three daughters and were married until her death in 2008.

Tombs died from complications of dementia at a care home in Coventry on 11 April 2020, at the age of 95.

== Coat of arms ==
Coat of arms of Francis Tombs, Baron Tombs
Crest Out of a crown rayonny Or, each straight ray ending in a mullet Or, a dexter arm embowed vested Azure the hand proper holding two keys in saltire bows upwards Gold. Escutcheon Azure, on a saltire Azure fimbriated Argent a sun, its four rays in saltire extended and tipped with flame all Gold. Supporters Dexter, a unicorn Argent, armed, unguled, bearded, maned and tufted Or, sejant erect upon a grassy mount Proper between two double roses growing therefrom Argent on Gules and both barbed and seeded, stalked and leaved proper; sinister, a bear Proper, clawed and muzzled Or, sejant erect upon a like mount between two thistles growing therefrom also Proper. Motto Work And Pray
