= North West Midlands Joint Electricity Authority =

- Company type: Public company
- Industry: Electricity generation and supply
- Founded: December 1924
- Defunct: 31 March 1948
- Fate: Nationalisation
- Successor: British Electricity Authority; Midlands Electricity Board
- Headquarters: York Chambers, Kingsway, Stoke-on-Trent
- Area served: Northeast Shropshire, northern Staffordshire and the Congleton area of Cheshire
- Services: Electricity supply

The North West Midlands Joint Electricity Authority was a United Kingdom statutory body established in 1929 with the responsibility to "provide or secure the provision of a cheap and abundant supply of electricity” in parts of the Midland counties of Shropshire, Staffordshire and Cheshire. The authority acquired electricity in bulk from electricity undertakings for distribution, and operated power stations. The authority was abolished upon nationalisation of the British electricity industry in 1948.

== Background ==
The Electricity (Supply) Act 1919 (9 & 10 Geo. 5. c. 100) established the statutory body of the Electricity Commissioners ‘to promote, regulate and supervise the supply of electricity’ under the direction of the Board of Trade. The act provided for the commissioners to constitute electricity districts and, where necessary, to establish joint electricity authorities (JEAs), ‘to provide or secure the provision of a cheap and abundant supply of electricity’, with the agreement of the electricity undertakings concerned. The aim of the joint authorities was to produce electricity more economically by inter-connecting power stations and transmission systems. The authority would acquire all the power stations in the area and build large, efficient and economic super-stations. In the event only four joint authorities were established: the London and Home Counties JEA; the North Wales and South Cheshire JEA; the West Midlands JEA; and the North West Midlands JEA.

== North West Midlands Joint Electricity Authority ==
A North West Midlands Electricity District was defined in December 1924. This was approved by local electricity undertakings and a scheme for a JEA was prepared by February 1926. Work on other grid schemes delayed progress until April 1928. A further delay meant that the North West Midlands Joint Electricity Authority was only established on 26 February 1929 after the House of Commons affirmed the draft North West Midlands Electricity District Order 1928.

The district covered an area of about 800 square miles, including northeast Shropshire, northern Staffordshire and the Congleton area of Cheshire. The JEA included the following electricity undertakings: Congleton; Leek; Newcastle-under-Lyme; Stafford; Stoke-on-Trent; Stone; and the Market Drayton Electric Light and Power Company.

The NWMJEA bought the Stoke-on-Trent and Stafford power stations from the local authorities on 1 April 1930. Thereafter Stoke Corporation and Stafford Corporation purchased electricity in bulk from the JEA.

The construction of the national grid (operating at 132 kV) provided wider connectivity. Stoke-on-Trent and Stafford were connected via a north-south line that extended south to Worcester and connected with the north west England, north Wales, south west England and south Wales schemes.

== Operations ==
In 1937 the key engineering and financial statistics for the NWMJEA was as follows.

NWMJEA Generating statistics 1937
Parameter	Stafford	Stoke-on-Trent
Boiler plant (total), lb/hr	122,000	360,000
Generators, MW	1 × 1.0 1 × 1.6 2 × 3.0 1 × 0.5 DC	2 × 3.0 1 × 6.0 2 × 12.5
Total generating capacity, kW	9,100	37,000
Total electricity generated, MWh	312.44	92,066.8
Total electricity purchased, MWh	121,159	
Total electricity sold, MWh	119,8890	
Number of customers	10,146	
Total expenditure to capital, £	1,400,728	
Sales of electricity, £	231,974	
Total expenditure to revenue, £	202,324	
Gross surplus, £	78,528	

The North West Midlands JEA planned to build a large power station to meet its projected electricity demand. A proposal in March 1939 for a station at Strongford on the river Trent south of Stoke met with opposition from landowners, residents, local authorities and companies. The Electricity Commissioners held an inquiry which ruled against the proposal. The JEA revised the plans and proposed a new power station at Meaford. A local inquiry was held in May 1941, but no decision was made until July 1944 when approval was granted. Construction started in February 1945 and the first generating set (of four) was commissioned in January 1948, followed by the second set in February 1948, the third and fourth sets, with the station then owned by the British Electricity Authority, were commissioned in July and October 1948.

The output of the individual NWMJEA power stations over time was as shown.

NWMJEA electricity generation (MWh), 1937-48
Year	Stafford	Stoke-on-Trent	Meaford
1937	312.44	92,067	-
1946	5,035	50,970	-
1947	7,609	63,619	-
1948	5,899	58,648	504,766

In the year ending 31 December 1947, the last full year of its operation, the North West Midland Joint Electricity Authority generated 76,039 MWh, purchased 415,320 MWh and sold 406,366 MWh with a value of £1,256,068 to 20,785 consumers. The gross operating surplus was £218,237.

The North West Midlands JEA's principal office was York Chambers, Kingsway, Stoke-on-Trent.

== Abolition ==
The North West Midlands JEA was abolished on 31 March 1948 under the provisions of the Electricity Act 1947 which nationalised British electricity supply industry. The NWMJEA’s assets were split between the British Electricity Authority (generation and transmission) and the Midlands Electricity Board (distribution).

== See also ==
- List of pre-nationalisation UK electric power companies
- London and Home Counties Joint Electricity Authority
- West Midlands Joint Electricity Authority
- North Wales and South Cheshire Joint Electricity Authority
- Joint electricity authority
