= Electricity Council =

- Type: State-owned government body
- Industry: Energy: Electricity
- Predecessor: Central Electricity Authority
- Founded: 1 January 1958
- Defunct: 9 November 2001
- Fate: Industry privatisation
- Successor: Electricity Association
- Headquarters: London, UK
- Area served: England and Wales
- Services: Electricity industry coordination and regulation
- Number of employees: 1257 (1989)

The Electricity Council was a governmental body set up in 1958 to oversee the electricity supply industry in England and Wales.

The council was established on 1 January 1958 to assume the coordinating and policy-making functions of the Central Electricity Authority (1955–7), which had in turn replaced the British Electricity Authority (1948–55). The Central Electricity Generating Board (CEGB) was also established in January 1958, as the body for electricity generation, transmission and bulk sales in England and Wales.

== Responsibilities ==
The council's responsibilities included:

- advising the Secretary of State for Energy on matters relating to the electricity supply industry in England and Wales
- helping the electricity boards in England and Wales to improve efficiency
- advising on the financing of the industry in England and Wales
- organising certain research
- maintaining the industry-wide industrial relations machinery

== Corporate structure ==
=== Background ===
In 1954, six years after nationalisation, the government appointed the Herbert Committee to examine the efficiency and organisation of the electricity industry. The committee found that the British Electricity Authority's dual roles of electricity generation and supervision had led to central concentration of responsibility and to duplication between headquarters and divisional staff which led to delays in the commissioning of new stations. The committee’s recommendations were enacted by the Electricity Act 1957 which established the Electricity Council to oversee the industry and the CEGB with responsibility for generation and transmission.

=== Constitution ===
The Electricity Council was established by Section 3 of the Electricity Act 1957. It comprised a chairman, two deputy chairmen, and up to three other independent people appointed by the Minister of Power. It also included the chairman and two full-time members of the Central Electricity Generating Board. The remaining members were the twelve chairmen of area electricity boards.

The chairmen of the Electricity Council were:

- Sir Henry Self (1890–1975), 1 January 1958 – 31 August 1959
- Sir (Clifford) Robertson King (1895–1974), 1 September 1959 – 1 December 1961
- Professor Sir Ronald Stanley Edwards (1910–1976), 1 January 1962 – 1 October 1968
- Sir Norman Randall Elliott, 1 November 1968 – 1 March 1972
- Sir Peter Menzies (1912–1988), 1 April 1972 – 31 March 1977
- Sir Francis L. Tombs (1924– 2020), 1 April 1977 – 30 November 1980
- Sir Austin Wyeth Bunch (1918–2008), 1 January 1981 – 31 March 1983
- Sir (Thomas) Philip Jones (1931–2000), 1 April 1983 – 31 March 1989.

The full membership of the Electricity Council, as first constituted, was as follows.

- Chairman: Sir Henry Self.
- Deputy Chairman: Sir Josiah Eccles.
- Deputy Chairman Professor R. S. Edwards.
- Other Members: Lord Citrine; C. T. Melling.
- Representing the CEGB: Sir Christopher Hinton.
- Representing the Area Boards
  - North Eastern: T. M. Ayres
  - Yorkshire: D. Bellamy
  - Southern: R. R. B. Brown
  - North Western: T. E. Daniel
  - South Eastern: Norman Elliott
  - South Wales: W. A. Gallon
  - South Western: A. N. Irens
  - London: D. B. Irving
  - Mersey and North Wales: D. H. Kendon
  - Midlands: W. S. Lewis
  - East Midlands: N. F. Marsh
  - Eastern: H. V. Pugh

Chief Officers of the Council

- Secretary and Solicitor: R. A. Finn
- Deputy Secretary: W. B. Noddings
- Deputy Legal Advisor: L. H. Kent
- Assistant Secretary (Administration): C. M. de L. Byrde
- Financial Advisor: A. M. Scott
- Deputy Financial Advisor: C. A. French
- Deputy Financial Advisor: F. A. Rawlings
- Commercial and Development Advisor: W. B. Noddings
- Deputy Commercial and Development Advisor: R. Y. Sanders
- Industrial Relations Advisor: D. G. Dodds
- Deputy Industrial Relations Advisor: R. D. V. Roberts
- Chairman of Superannuation Schemes: David Moffat
- Establishments Officer: E. Landucci
- Press and Information Advisor: G. Morley Davies

Later members of the council included: P. Briggs, Sir Henry Douglas, Josiah Eccles, Lord Geddes of Epsom, P.A. Lingard, N.F. Marsh, R.D.V Roberts, and Sir Alan Wilson.

=== Organisation ===
The organisational structure (see above) comprised departments headed by an advisor. By 1967 these were: Secretarial/Legal (J.A. Wedgwood), Financial (C.A. French), Industrial Relations (no-one in post) and Commercial (L.F. Robson). In 1978 new departments were created for Public Relations, Marketing and Engineering.

The headquarters were in London, initially in Trafalgar Buildings in Charing Cross Road, then in the 1960s at Millbank Tower. For liaison with the Area Electricity Boards outstation offices were established such as in Bristol. The EC training establishment was at Horsley Towers, Surrey.

There were 535 staff in 1959, 1083 in 1967, and 1257 in 1989.

In 1969 the government proposed to reconstitute the Electricity Council and rename it the Electricity Authority with "new powers to plan and control the policy of the industry as a whole". The proposals were embodied in the Electricity Bill 1970, however Parliament was dissolved in May 1970 and the bill lapsed.

== Operations ==
In 1965 the Electricity Council Research Centre was established at Capenhurst, Cheshire. It undertook research on distribution technology and utilisation of electricity.

The council took over responsibility from the Electrical Development Association in 1966 for all national promotional work carried out on behalf of the Area Boards, in 1968 this became the Council's marketing department.

The Electricity Council’s Electro-Agriculture Centre was established in 1967 at the Royal Showground at Stoneleigh, Warwickshire. Over the following decade the council published a series of guides on aspects of the role of electricity in farming and agriculture.

The Electricity Council's Appliance Testing Laboratories were expanded in May 1969 to improve the emphasis on performance testing.

The Electricity Council opened the Air Conditioning Advisory Bureau in Northumberland Avenue, London in 1970 to promote air conditioning.

The Electricity Council established British Electricity International Ltd. in 1976 to develop overseas consultancy.

In 1979 the council published its annual Medium Term Development Plan, setting out the council’s objectives for the electricity supply industry for 1979 to 1986. The Plan had not previously been publicly available.

== Publications ==
- The Electricity Council, Annual Report and accounts (Various dates), The Electricity Council, London.
- The Electricity Council, Lightning Protection of Distribution Networks, The Electricity Council, London, n.d.
- The Electricity Council, A History of Electricity Supply, E.C. Library Reading List No, 8.
- The Electricity Council, Historical Development of Electric Power Generation and Supply in Great Britain, E.C. Intelligence Branch Bibliography B25.
- The Electricity Council, Some Landmarks in the History of the Electricity Supply Industry, E.C. Intelligence Branch Reference Paper.
- The Electricity Council, Power for the Future, The Electricity Council, London, 1958.
- The Electricity Council, Lighting in industry (Electricity and productivity series; no.2), The Electricity Council, London, 1967.
- The Electricity Council, Electric Farming, The Electricity Council, London, 1969.
- The Electricity Council, Electric growing, The Electricity Council, London, 1972.
- The Electricity Council, Growing rooms: A guide to the practical design of installations (Grow electric handbook), The Electricity Council, 1975.
- The Electricity Council, Farmelectric Handbook 23: Vegetable storage: A Guide to the Practical Design of Installations, The Electricity Council, Kennilworth, 1975.
- The Electricity Council, Farmelectric Handbook, at least 23 volumes, The Electricity Council, Kennilworth, various date 1970s.
- The Electricity Council, Automatic feeding of cattle: A guide to the practical design of installations (Farmelectric handbook), The Electricity Council, The Centre, 1975.
- The Electricity Council, Handbook of Electricity Supply Statistics, The Electricity Council, London, 1979.
- The Electricity Council, British Nuclear Achievements, The Electricity Council, London, 1979.
- The Electricity Council, Electricity Supply in the United Kingdom. A Chronology - from the beginnings of the industry to 31 December 1985, The Electricity Council, London, 1987.
- The Electricity Council, Handbook of Electricity Supply Statistics, The Electricity Council, London, 1989.
- The Electricity Council (ed), Power System Protection. Vol 1: Principles and Components, Vol 2: Systems and methods, Vol 3: Applications. Institution of Engineering & Technology, London, 1989.

== Privatisation ==
Upon privatisation of the UK electricity industry in 1989–90 many of the functions of the Electricity Council were no longer needed. A residuary body the Electricity Association continued for a few years.

The property, rights and liabilities of the Electricity Council were transferred to three nominated successor companies: the Electricity Association, National Power and Electra Brands by the Electricity Act 1989 (Nominated Companies) (England and Wales) Order 1990 (SI 1990/224). on 31 March 1990 under section 66 of the Electricity Act 1989. The council was formally wound up on 9 November 2001 by the Electricity Council (Dissolution) Order 2001 (SI 2001/3420), made under the Electricity Act 1989.

== See also ==
- Timeline of the UK electricity supply industry
