= Powerhouse (retailer) =

Powerhouse was a United Kingdom electrical goods retail chain which went into administration in 2003 and finally entered receivership in August 2006. At one time it was the third largest trader in the UK electrical goods market.

== History ==
Powerhouse was born in 1992 from a management buyout of the retail arms of Southern Electric, Midlands Electricity and Eastern Electricity. The head office was based in Bicester. In an attempt to differentiate themselves in the market they positioned themselves as 'local experts' with each store's main sign bearing the town's name. To fill gaps in their product lineup many stores had concessions for Time Computers and their short-lived mobile phone arm Time Talk. There was also a close relationship with Sony – all stores up until the PRG buyout had 'Sony In-Store' sections where Sony products were isolated on backlit gondolas. nPower were also partners, with Powerhouse acting on their behalf to sign up new customers. This was a sound theory, as Powerhouse's strengths were in the MDA sectors and these deals helped their offering look competitive. However, Time Computers was not in good shape. Time Talk barely lasted 12 months. All Time concessions had closed by 2002 but were not officially refurbished. It was left to the individual store to best use the space as they saw fit.

Powerhouse initially traded strongly and bought out the Scottish Power retail outlets in an attempt to widen their footprint. Very little effort was put into refurbishing the shops in Scotland and the Scottish Power logo could often still be seen etched into the glass in the former surround sound and Hifi demo areas. Additionally, this led to some towns having more than one Powerhouse store (e.g. Nottingham).

At its peak, Powerhouse had 220 stores in 2000. In August 2003 following a very poor peak 2002 80 stores were immediately closed. The company continued to trade for two weeks while looking for a buyer. At the end of the two weeks, the company went into administration.

== Buyout ==
The Pacific Retail Group from New Zealand purchased the leases and assets of Powerhouse. They evaluated the entire store portfolio and opened PRG Powerhouse with 180 stores (some of them having been closed two weeks previously). Unfortunately, due to a desire to keep costs low, no signage was changed and only small notices informed customers that the new firm was not liable for any items customers had paid for and not received from the former company. As a gesture of goodwill, they honoured the small item replacement warranty in-store. Large item warranty claims were handled by the underwriters. This initially led to a great deal of difficulty for in-store staff as angry customers struggled to get their faulty goods replaced. Internally the stores went through a minor refit, mainly to remove the Sony in-store branding and to better focus on the growing trend of flatscreen TVs.

Powerhouse had several holes in its product lineup. Following the removal of the Time Talk and Time Computers concessions, Powerhouse sold no computers or mobile phones. Games consoles were only stocked erratically around peak time. No attempt was made to sell the emerging iPod.

== Go Switch On ==
In an attempt to leave the Powerhouse name behind, it was planned to relaunch the new company as 'Go Switch On', majoring in high-technology items that Powerhouse had previously ignored. A new website was launched and four stores (Slough, Waterlooville, Blackburn and Brentwood) were fully refurbished. Little is known as to what happened at this point, but the relaunch was never completed and the chain went into receivership on 9 August 2006.

== Demise ==
PRG Powerhouse were never able to gain significant traction in the UK electrical retail market. Store closures began in 2005 and, by the start of 2006, the company had fewer than 100 stores. Central warehouse distribution had ceased and each store was run as a factory outlet with local 'man with a van' firms subcontracted to handle deliveries. In June 2006, the remaining stores went into administration, but were again saved.

== See also ==
- The Gadget Shop
