= Midlands Electricity =

- Industry: Electricity
- Founded: 1990
- Defunct: 2002
- Fate: Acquired
- Successor: E.ON
- Headquarters: Halesowen, UK

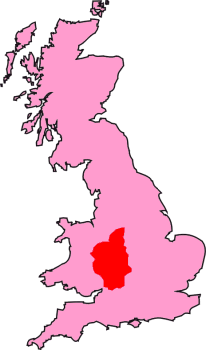
The area of MEB within Great Britain

The Midlands Electricity Board was the public sector utility company responsible for the purchase of electricity from the electricity generator (the Central Electricity Generating Board from 1958) and its distribution and sale of electricity to customers in the Midlands of England prior to 1990. As Midlands Electricity plc it was listed on the London Stock Exchange and was once a constituent of the FTSE 100 Index.

== History ==
The Midlands Electricity Board was formed under the Electricity Act 1947 of that year. The counterpart of the East Midlands board, it served southern, and western parts of Warwickshire, as well as the counties of Worcestershire, Herefordshire, Shropshire, and Staffordshire, as well as most of Gloucestershire, the West Midlands conurbation and northern Oxfordshire.

The key people on the board were: Chairman G. S. Buckingham (1964, 1967), deputy chairman R. Mallet (1967), full-time members R. Mallet (1964) R. Cook and H. A. P. Caddell (1967).

As with the EMEB, it kept a network of showrooms across its area, to allow customers to pay bills, and order many types of electrical goods. The MEB, Southern Electric and Eastern Electricity merged their showrooms, forming the Powerhouse store chain in the early 1990s. The total number of customers supplied by the board was:

MEB customers, 1948–88
Year	1948/9	1960/1	1965/6	1970/1	1975/6	1978/9	1980/1	1985/6	1987/8	1988/9
Number of customers (thousands)	938	1,454	1,610	1,721	1,8229	1,893	1,939	2,032	2,073	2,096

Electricity, in GWh, sold by Midlands Electricity Board

In 1990, as part of the privatisation of the UK electricity industry, the board became Midlands Electricity plc. The new business was split up, and sold several times: the supply business to Npower in 1999, the distribution business to GPU Power UK, who continued to use the 'a Midlands Electricity company' tagline for a couple of years, and then sold to Aquila, under whose short ownership it was renamed Aquila Networks, before being purchased by Powergen in 2004, becoming Central Networks, part of E.ON.

The company was then sold in 2011 to American utilities company PPL who owns the UK distribution company Western Power Distribution, who were already operating in the license area of the previous company SWEB (South West) and Infralec (Wales), and rebranded the Midlands areas WPD West Midlands PLC and WPD East Midlands PLC (previously EMEB).

In 2021, PPL placed Western Power Distribution up for sale, being purchased by National Grid, who as of 21 September 2022 has rebranded the WPD business as National Grid. The distribution business is internally known as National Grid Electricity Distribution (NGED) to differentiate from National Grid Electricity Transmission (NGET).

=== Existing electricity suppliers taken over at nationalisation ===
The Electricity (Allocation of Undertakings to Area Boards) Order 1948 (SI 1948/484) transferred the electricity business of the following local authorities and private companies to the new board effective 31 March 1948.

==== Local authorities ====
- Birmingham Corporation
- Cannock Urban District Council
- Cheltenham Corporation
- Gloucester Corporation
- Leek Urban District Council
- Lichfield Corporation
- Malvern Urban District Council
- Newcastle-under-Lyme Corporation
- North West Midlands Joint Electricity Authority
- Stafford Corporation
- Stoke-on-Trent Corporation
- Stone Urban District Council
- Sutton Coldfield Corporation
- Walsall Corporation
- Warmley Rural District Council
- West Bromwich Corporation
- West Midlands Joint Electricity Authority
- Wolverhampton Corporation
- Worcester Corporation

==== Private companies ====
- Chasetown and District Electricity Company
- Market Drayton Electric Light and Power Company
- Midland Electric Corporation for Power Distribution
- Shropshire, Worcestershire and Staffordshire Electric Power Company
- Stroud Electric Supply Company
- Thornbury and District Electricity Company
- West Gloucestershire Power Company

== See also ==
- Companies merged into MEB
- Npower
