= Trafalgar Buildings =

Building in London, England

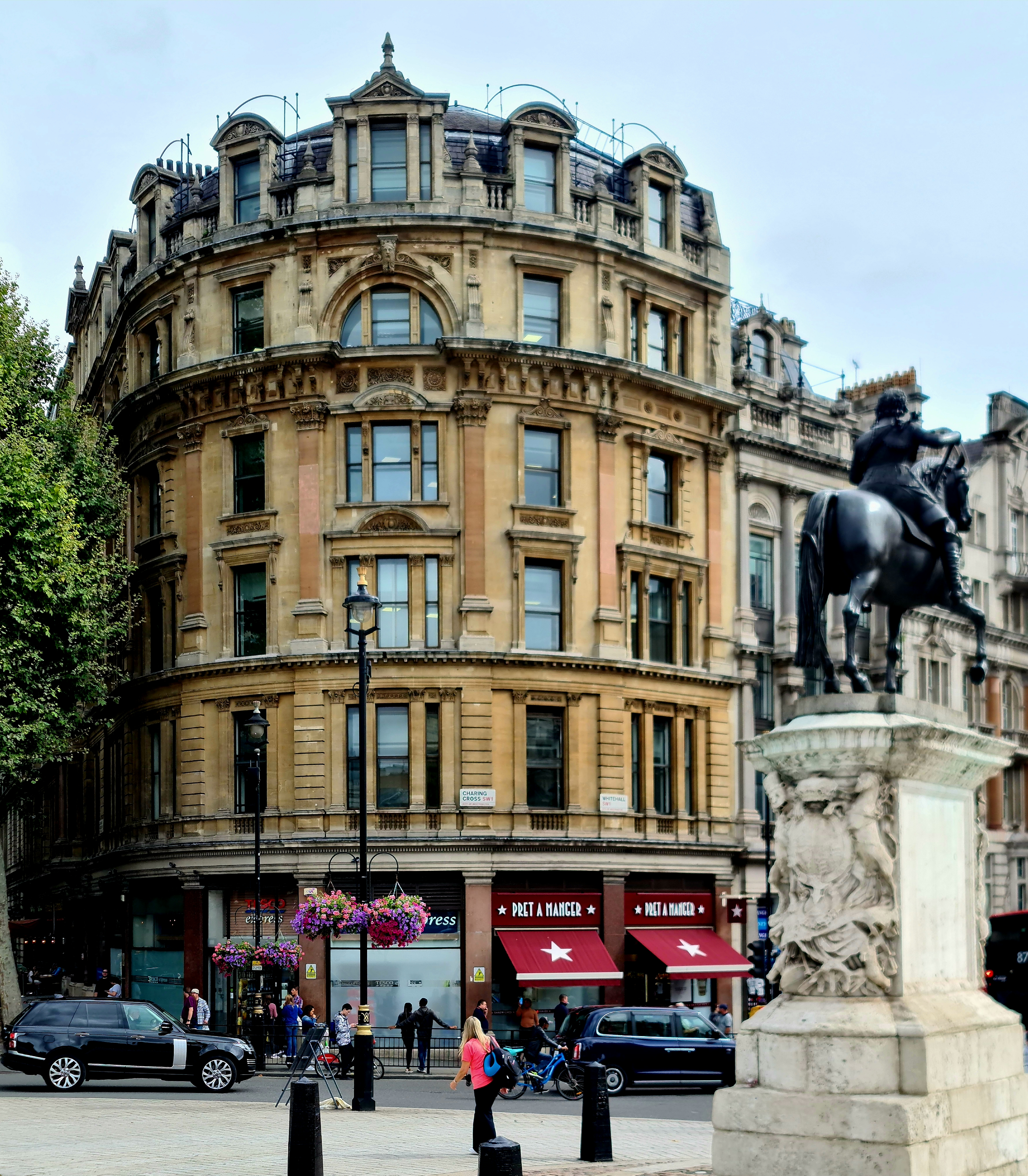
- Interactive map of the Trafalgar Buildings area

General information
- Type: Commercial
- Location: London, England
- Coordinates: 51°30′26″N 0°07′37″W
- Completed: 1883

Design and construction
- Architects: F. and H. Francis

Listed Building – Grade II
- Official name: Trafalgar Buildings
- Designated: 01 December 1987
- Reference no.: 1266434

The Trafalgar Buildings are a set of Grade II listed buildings on the corner of Trafalgar Square and Whitehall in London.

== History ==
The Trafalgar Buildings were built as part of a broader development by Frederick Gordon which included many hotels along Northumberland Avenue. The road had been newly built as a cut through from Trafalgar Square to the Victoria Embankment on the former site of Northumberland House.

They were designed by Frederick John and Horace Francis and built between 1882 and 1883. Additions by Edwin Cooper were carried out in 1913.

The buildings were used as offices, with refurbishment first proposed in 2020. In 2025, an application for converting the buildings into a hotel was rejected but later given the go-ahead in 2026.
