= Central Electricity Board =

UK electricity supplier established 1926, ended 1948

- Type: Government regulatory body
- Industry: Energy: Electricity
- Founded: February 1927
- Defunct: 31 March 1948
- Fate: Industry nationalisation
- Successor: British Electricity Authority
- Headquarters: Trafalgar Buildings, 1 Charing Cross, London SW1, United Kingdom
- Area served: Great Britain
- Key people: See section in text
- Services: Regulation of electricity industry
- Number of employees: 1248 (1934)

The United Kingdom Central Electricity Board (CEB) was established by the Electricity (Supply) Act 1926. It had the duty to supply electricity to authorised electricity undertakers, to determine which power stations would be 'selected' stations to generate electricity for the board, to provide main transmission lines to interconnect selected stations and electricity undertakers, and to standardise generating frequency.

== History ==
In 1925 Lord Weir chaired a committee that proposed the creation of the Central Electricity Board to link the UK’s most efficient power stations with consumers via a ‘national gridiron’. At that time, the industry consisted of more than 600 electricity supply companies and local authority undertakings, and different areas operated at different voltages and frequencies (including DC in some places). The board's first chairman was Andrew Duncan.

The CEB established the UK's first synchronised AC grid, running at 132 kilovolts and 50 Hertz, which by 1933 was a collection of local grids, with emergency interlinks, covering most of England. This started operating as a national system, the National Grid, in 1938.

After completion of the National Grid the role of the CEB changed from planning and construction to operating and managing the regional grid systems.

The CEB established laboratories at Croydon and Waddon to undertake research on high voltage transmission problems.

The CEB co-existed with the Electricity Commissioners, an industry regulator responsible to the Ministry of Transport.

The CEB ceased to exist when the electricity industry was nationalised by the Electricity Act 1947 and taken over by the British Electricity Authority.

== Key people ==
=== Chairmen ===
There were four chairmen of the Central Electricity Board between 1927 and 1948:

- Sir Andrew Duncan (1884–1952), Chairman 1927–35.
- Sir Archibald Page (1875–1949), Chairman 1935–44.
- Harold Hobson, Chairman 1944–46.
- Sir Johnstone Wright (1883–1953), Chairman 1947–48.

=== The board ===
Upon its establishment in 1927 the Board comprised a full-time chairman and seven part-time members, all appointed by the Minister of Transport. The inaugural part-time members were:

- Sir James Lithgow (1883–1952), businessman.
- Sir Duncan Watson, former chairman of the London and Home Counties Joint Electricity Authority.
- Sir James Lyne Devonshire (1863–1946), vice-president of Tramways, Light Railways and Transport Association.
- William Walker, vice chair of Manchester Corporation Electricity Committee.
- Walter Kennedy Whigham (1878–1948), director of the Bank of England.
- Vernon Willey (1884–1982) (Lord Barnby).
- Frank Hodges, labour representative, secretary to the International Miners’ Federation.

=== Other key CEB staff ===
Under the board were a general manager, secretary, chief engineer, commercial manager and support sections. Some key people were:

- Sir John Brooke, secretary to the board; an electricity commissioner from 1929.
- Sir Archibald Page (1875–1945), chief engineer and general manager; CEB chairman from 1935–44; a former electricity commissioner.
- Harold Hobson, supply engineer; commercial manager 1932–35; general manager from 1935; CEB chairman 1944–46.
- Sir Johnstone Wright (1883–1953), deputy chief engineer; chief engineer 1933–44; general manager 1944–47; CEB chairman 1947–8.
- David Coates, chief accountant, finance officer.
- Richard Hodding Fox, board solicitor, secretary to the board from 1929.
- J.W. Beauchamp, commercial manager 1935–37.
- Edgar R. Wilkinson, commercial manager from 1937.
- Sir Ralph Lewis Wedgwood (1874–1956), board member from 1930.
- R.P. Sloan, board member from 1936.
- Sir Andrew Watson, board member from 1939.
- Lord Barnby (1884-1982), board member from 1940.

== Earley power station ==
In 1940 the Electricity Commissioners in agreement with the Central Electricity Board proposed a programme of new generating capacity to mitigate war risks and the growth in demand associated with the development of munitions factories. The programme entailed the installation of 180 MW of plant in four existing stations and two new stations one at Earley east of Reading (51°27.6899′N 0°55.5858′W) and the other at Castle Meads, Gloucester. Earley was the only power station owned by the CEB; it was operated by Edmundsons Electricity Corporation until nationalisation in 1948.

The supply from Earley commenced on 8 December 1942, only 22 months after the start of construction. The plant initially comprised a Parsons 40 MW steam turbo-alternator fed from three pulverised fuel coal boilers with a total steam capacity of 600,000 lb/hr at 635 psi at 850 °F (75.6 kg/s, 43.8 bar at 454 °C). This plant was originally for export to South Africa but was made available to the CEB.

In 1942 it was decided to add a second 40 MW set and two further boilers with a total capacity of 400,000 lb/hr (50.4 kg/s) which was bought into use in 1945. A third 40 MW set with 400,000 lb/hr boilers was installed in 1945–47. In its final configuration there were seven International Combustion boilers each with a capacity of 200,000 lb/hr (25.2 kg/s). Generation was at 33 kV and transmission at 33 kV and 132 kV. Cooling water was abstracted from the river.

Upon nationalisation of the British electricity supply industry in 1948 the ownership of Earley power station was vested in the British Electricity Authority, and subsequently the Central Electricity Authority and the Central Electricity Generating Board (CEGB).

Earley was also the site of a pioneering main-service gas turbine, this was a 56 MW machine driven by four Rolls-Royce Avon jet engines and was commissioned in 1965. A second diesel-fired gas turbine was installed later.

The operating parameters and electricity output of Earley power station is given in the following table.

Earley power station
Year	Maximum output capacity, MW	Running hours or load factor, %	Electricity output, GWh	Thermal efficiency, %
1946		(52.5 %)	376.312	25.18
1947	120		399.409	
1948	120		539.020	
1954	114	7635	396.879	24.71
1955	114	6947	400.616	24.46
1956	114	7078	418.775	25.00
1957	114	6577	398.312	24.95
1958	114	5988	325.201	24.46
1961	114	22.0 %	219.328	23.99
1962	114	24.3 %	242.594	24.31
1963	114	20.55 %	205.236	24.21
1967	114	37.7 %	376.772	24.35
1967	111 (GT)	8.8 %	85.663	23.04
1972	114	28.4 %	284.703	23.82
1972	111 (GT)	6.0 %	58.219	22.15
1979	111 (GT)	0.6 %	6.001	19.40
1981	111 (GT)	–	0.145	–
1982	111 (GT)	0.1 %	1.265	14.35

The steam plant and generators were decommissioned in the 1970s. The gas-turbine plant and the whole station were decommissioned in 1982, the two chimneys demolished in 1982.

== Locations ==
The CEB headquarters was at Trafalgar Buildings, 1 Charing Cross, London SW1. There was also an establishment at Horsley Towers, East Horsley, Surrey.
