= British Electricity Authority =

UK electricity supplier established from 1948 to 1955

- Type: State owned government body and regulator
- Industry: Energy: electricity
- Predecessor: Electricity undertakings, Central Electricity Board, Electricity Commissioners
- Founded: 15 August 1947
- Defunct: 31 March 1955
- Fate: Restructuring
- Successor: Central Electricity Authority
- Headquarters: London, United Kingdom
- Area served: England, Wales and Southern Scotland
- Key people: see text
- Production output: 69,077 GWh (1955)
- Services: Electricity generating, transmission and sales
- Revenue: £366.8 million (1955)
- Net income: £18.8 million (1955)
- Number of employees: 179,171 (1955)
- Divisions: Central authority and 14 area boards

The British Electricity Authority (BEA) was established as the central British electricity authority in 1948 under the nationalisation of Great Britain's electricity supply industry enacted by the Electricity Act 1947. The BEA was responsible for the generation, transmission and sale of electricity to area electricity boards, and the development and maintenance of an efficient, coordinated and economical system of electricity supply.

== History ==
The authority took over the operations of over 600 small public supply power companies, municipal authority electricity departments and the Central Electricity Board to form the BEA, which comprised a central authority and 14 area boards. Its scope did not include control of the North of Scotland Hydro-Electric Board, which had been founded in 1943 and remained independent of the BEA.

The appointment of chairmen and members of the BEA and the area boards were made in August 1947 and the BEA was formally established on 15 August 1947. The 14 area boards were formally established on 1 January 1948, and Vesting Day, when the BEA and area boards became responsible for electricity supply, was on 1 April 1948.

The London headquarters were initially at British Electricity House, Great Portland Street, W1, then British Electricity House, Trafalgar Buildings, Strand, SW1, and British Electricity House, Winsley Street, W1.

== Board structure ==
The British Electricity Authority was established by Section 2 of the Electricity Act 1947. It comprised a chairman and four to six other members appointed by the Minister of Fuel and Power; four members, also appointed by the minister, who were chairmen of an area electricity board (in rotation); and one other member who was chairman of the North of Scotland Hydro-Electric Board.

=== Management board members ===
The first appointments to the board were:

- Lord Citrine, former member of the National Coal Board, Chairman
- Sir Henry Self, permanent secretary of the Ministry of Civil Aviation, Deputy Chairman (Administration)
- Sir John Hacking, chief engineer of the Central Electricity Board, Deputy Chairman (Operations)
- Ernest Bussey, general secretary of the Electrical Trades Union, Member for Labour Relations and Welfare
- Dame Caroline Haslett, director of the Electrical Association for Women, member
- Sir William Walker, former Lord Mayor of Manchester, member
- Tom Johnston, North of Scotland Hydro-Electric Board, member
- Josiah Eccles, Merseyside and North Wales Electricity Board, member
- W. Lewis, Midland Electricity Board, Member
- J. S. Pickles, South West Scotland Electricity Board, member
- Henry John Randall, London Electricity Board, member

Subsequent appointments were, by rotation, the chairman of the South Eastern (Norman R. Elliott), East Midlands (C. R. King), South Wales (L. Howes) and South East Scotland Electricity Board (Sir Norman Duke) were appointed members of the BEA from 1 January 1950. Their terms expired on 31 December 1951 and were succeeded by the appointment of C. T. Melling (Eastern Electricity Board), H. H. Mullens (North Eastern), H. Nimmo (Southern), and S. F. Steward (South Western).

Sir John Hacking retired in 1953 and his place on the board was taken by Josiah Eccles as deputy chairman with effect from January 1954.

Appointments by rotation with effect from 1 January 1954 were H. J. Randall (London), W. S. Lewis (Midlands), D. Bellamy (Yorkshire), and Sir John Hallsworth (North Western).

=== Headquarters organisation ===
The headquarters organisation had seven main departments.

The Chief Contracts Officer (F. W. Smith) was responsible to both of the deputy chairmen.

A board member (E. W. Bussey) was responsible for Labour Relations and Welfare.

Under the Deputy Chairman for Administration (Sir Henry Self) were:

- The Secretary (H. F. Carpenter)
- Commercial Manager (E. R. Wilkinson)
- Chief Accountant (D. W. Coates)
- Chief legal adviser (R. A. Finn)

Under the Deputy Chairman for Operations (Sir John Hacking) was:

- Chief Engineer (V. A. Pask), who had four deputy chief engineers
  - Deputy Chief Engineer Generation had two engineering teams:
    - Generation Design Engineer
    - Generation Operations Engineer
  - Deputy Chief Engineer Transmission had three engineering teams:
    - Transmission Design Engineer
    - Transmission Construction Engineer
    - System Operation Engineer, responsible for national control
  - Deputy Chief Engineer Generating Station Construction had four engineering teams:
    - Coordination Engineer
    - Production Inspection and Test Engineer
    - Specifications and Contracts
    - HQ Stations Supervising Engineer
  - Deputy Chief Engineer Research had two engineering teams:
    - Director of Laboratories
    - Engineer-in-Charge Electro-Technical Research

== Area boards ==
Area electricity boards were established by Section 3 of the Electricity Act 1947. They were responsible for the distribution of electricity and sales to customers. They comprised a chairman and five to seven other members appointed by the Minister of Fuel and Power after consultation with the central authority; and one member holding the office of chairman of the consultative council. The new area boards were:

1. East Midlands Electricity Board (EMEB)
2. Eastern Electricity Board (EEB)
3. London Electricity Board (LEB)
4. Merseyside and North Wales Electricity Board (MANWEB)
5. Midlands Electricity Board (MEB)
6. North Eastern Electricity Board (NEEB)
7. North Western Electricity Board (NORWEB)
8. South East Scotland Electricity Board
9. South Eastern Electricity Board (SEEBOARD)
10. South Wales Electricity Board (SWALEC)
11. South West Scotland Electricity Board
12. South Western Electricity Board (SWEB)
13. Southern Electricity Board (SEB)
14. Yorkshire Electricity Board (YEB)

== Consultative councils ==
Section 7 of the Electricity Act 1947 established a consultative council for each of the area electricity boards. These councils had the duty of considering matters affecting the distribution of electricity in the area, including tariffs and the provision of new or improved services, following representations by consumers or other persons requiring supplies; they could also consider any matter referred to them by the area board. They were to notify their conclusions to the board.

The councils consisted of between twenty and thirty persons appointed by the minister. Not less than half nor more than three-fifths were appointed from a panel of members of local authorities. The remainder represented agriculture, commerce, industry, labour and the general interests of consumers of electricity in the area. The chairman of each consultative council was a member of the area electricity board.

== Operations ==
=== Electricity generation, supply and sales ===
The electricity generated, supplied and sold, in GWh, over the establishment of the BEA was as follows:

BEA electricity supplies and sales
Numbers in GWh	Year							
Numbers in GWh	1947/8	1948/9	1949/50	1950/1	1951/2	1952/3	1953/4	1954/5
Electricity generated	38,665	42,824	45,717	51,859	55,316	57,365	61,621	69,077
Electricity supplied	36,391	40,314	43,036	48,888	52,060	53,920	57,857	64,860
Imports	318	472	410	363	436	430	364	311
Exports	130	194	355	353	268	244	286	276
Total supplies by BEA	36,579	40,592	43,091	48,898	52,228	54,106	57,935	64,895
Used in transmission	618	758	797	948	976	1,053	1,215	1,428
Sales to direct customers	240	623	676	705	709	764	1,016	1,431
Sales to area boards	35,658	39,211	41,618	47,245	50,543	52,288	55,704	62,036
Purchased by area boards from private sources	119	113	90	170	189	159	169	188
Used in distribution	3,348	4,008	4,119	5,095	4,797	4,857	5,191	5,845
Sales by area boards	32,429	35,316	37,589	42,320	45,935	47,590	50,682	56,379

=== Financial ===
A summary of the BEA's financial results is as follows:

BEA financial summary
£ million	Year				
£ million	1948/9	1951/2	1952/3	1953/4	1954/5
Income from electricity sales	191.1	256.4	285.6	319.6	356.3
Other	6.7	8.0	6.7	7.8	10.5
Total income	197.8	264.4	292.3	327.4	366.8
Expenditure	177.1	237.5	255.1	279.8	310.5
Operating profit	20.7	26.9	37.2	47.6	56.3
Interest	16.3	24.0	29.9	34.4	37.5
Profit after interest	4.4	2.9	7.3	13.2	18.8

=== Employees ===
There were a total of 169,000 employees in the electricity supply industry 1952, comprising:

Managerial and higher executive	1,224
Technical and scientific	13,707
Technical staff trainees	537
Executive, clerical, accountancy and sales	39,669
Industrial	107,652
Apprentices	5,911

== Publications ==
- Report and statement of accounts - British Electricity Authority, London, HMSO, 1949-55.
- British Electricity Authority, Electricity supply, Directory of B.E.A., boards and officials. [With portraits and a map.] British Electricity Authority, London, 1948.
- Glyn Bowen-Jones and British Electricity Authority, Souvenir of the opening of Kingston Power Station by His Majesty the King accompanied by Her Majesty the Queen, on the 27th day of October, 1948, London, 1948.
- British Electricity Authority, National negotiations in industry: Address, British Electricity Authority, London, 1949.
- British Electricity Authority, British electricity: its organisation under public ownership, London, 1950.
- British Electricity Authority Publications Vols. 1, 2 and 3, 1950. Volume 3 comprises Organisation Charts, ‘Two Years’ Work’ and ‘Summer Schools Oxford’.
- British Electricity Authority, British electricity conference: held at the Royal Hall, Harrogate, 19th June, 1950, London, British Electricity Authority, 1950.
- British Electricity Authority, Beam: Magazine of the B.E.A., Midlands Division Branch, London, 1954.
- British Electricity Authority, Power and prosperity, British Electricity Authority, 1954.

== Successors ==
As a result of the Electricity Reorganisation (Scotland) Act 1954, the British Electricity Authority was replaced on 1 April 1955 by the Central Electricity Authority (CEA) for England and Wales. At the same time, the two South of Scotland Area Boards and the associated electricity generation and distribution plant were merged into the South of Scotland Electricity Board (SSEB) to form an integrated electricity board responsible for generation, distribution and electricity supply in southern and central Scotland.

Soon afterwards, the Electricity Act 1957 dissolved the Central Electricity Authority, which it replaced with the Central Electricity Generating Board (CEGB) and the Electricity Council.

== See also ==
- Electricity Act 1947
- Electricity Act 1957
- Electricity Act 1989
- Utilities Act 2000
- Timeline of the UK electricity supply industry
- List of pre-nationalisation UK electric power companies
- Public electricity supplier
