= Central Electricity Authority =

UK electricity supplier from 1955 until 1957

- Formerly: British Electricity Authority
- Type: State owned government operational and regulatory body
- Industry: Energy: Electricity
- Predecessor: British Electricity Authority
- Founded: 1 April 1955
- Defunct: 31 December 1957
- Fate: Abolished by restructuring of industry
- Successor: Central Electricity Generating Board, Electricity Council
- Headquarters: London, United Kingdom
- Area served: England and Wales
- Key people: see text
- Production output: 79,525 GWh (1956)
- Services: Electricity generating, transmission and sales
- Revenue: £413.2 million (1956)
- Number of employees: 182,936 (1957)
- Divisions: 12 Generation Divisions and Area Electricity Boards

The Central Electricity Authority (CEA) was a body that managed and operated the electricity supply industry in England and Wales between 1 April 1955 and 31 December 1957. The CEA replaced the earlier British Electricity Authority (BEA) as a result of the Electricity Reorganisation (Scotland) Act 1954, which moved responsibility for Scottish electricity supply to the Scottish Office.

== Structure ==
The structure of the management board and the personnel in post remained the same as the BEA with the exception of the removal of representation by the chairman of the North of Scotland Hydro-Electric Board. There was a reduction from 14 to 12 of the number of area electricity boards – the South East Scotland Electricity Board and South West Scotland Electricity Board were removed from the CEA's management. The functions of the remaining area boards were unchanged.

Upon its establishment in April 1955 the chairman of the CEA was Lord Citrine; the two deputy chairmen were Sir Henry Self and Josiah Eccles.

=== Appointments ===
Later appointments to the Central Electricity Authority by rotation between area boards were:

- N. Elliott, South Eastern Board, member from January 1956
- C. R. King, East Midlands Board, member from January 1956
- L. Howles, South Wales Board, member from January 1956
- D. H. Kendon, Merseyside and North Wales Board, member from January 1956.

The following were appointed to the board in 1956:

- G. A. S. Nairn, part-time member of North Wales Electricity Board since 1947, member
- Sir Leslie Nicholls, chairman Cable and Wireless, member
- Sir Henry Self, deputy chairman, reappointed
- G. H. E. Woodward, part-time member, reappointed.

The following were appointed to the board in 1957:

- J. D. Peattie, chief engineer of the board retired 31 January but retained as consultant
- F. H. S. Brown, was appointed chief engineer
- E. S. Booth, construction engineer was appointed deputy chief engineer
- J. C. Duckworth, was appointed deputy chief engineer (nuclear power)

== Operations ==
=== Electricity generation and sales ===
The electricity generated, supplied and sold by the CEA, in GWh, was as follows:

CEA electricity supplies and sales
Numbers in GWh	Year	
Numbers in GWh	1955/6	1956/7
Electricity generated	75,561	79,525
Electricity supplied	70,849	74,597
Imports	154	125
Exports	489	514
Total supplies by CEA	70,559	74,208
Used in transmission	1,599	1,771
Sales to direct customers	1,815	2,204
Sales to Area Boards	67,145	70,233
Purchased by Area Boards from private sources	160	146
Used in distribution	5,855	5,069
Sales by Area Boards	61,450	65,310

Note: import and export include bulk supplies from South of Scotland.

=== Customers ===
The numbers and types of CEA customers was as follows:

CEA customers
Type of customer, thousands	Year	
Type of customer, thousands	1955/6	1956/7
Domestic	12,427	12,779
Farm	175	188
Commercial	1,139	1,161
Combined domestic and commercial	230	229
Industrial	171	174
Total	14,146	14,535

=== Employees ===
There was a total of 180,923 employees in the electricity supply industry 1956, this comprised:

- Managerial and higher executive: 1,335
- Technical and scientific: 15,480
- Technical staff trainees: 1,624
- Executive, clerical, accountancy and sales: 40,636
- Industrial: 115,934
- Apprentices: 5,914

=== Strategic issues ===
In addition to the routine operations of generating and transmitting electricity the Central Electricity Authority dealt with a number of strategic issues.

In the mid-1950s the National Coal Board estimated that it would be unable to supply the electricity industry’s projected demand for coal in the 1960s. Pressure was put on the CEA by the Ministry of Fuel and Power to adopt dual (coal and oil) firing in a large number of power stations being planned or then being constructed. The CEA believed that the cost of extra equipment and the high price of oil would make the scheme uneconomic. The CEA limited dual-firing to a small number of stations in the south of the country remote from coal fields.

In addition to coal and oil, nuclear power was under development in the 1950s. The newly constituted CEA had urgently needed to find suitable sites for the first nuclear stations. They had to be in the south of England near the major load centres, but away from major population areas. They needed to have good load-bearing properties for the heavy reactors and have an abundant source of water. Two sites were identified in Bradwell, Essex and Berkeley, Gloucestershire.

The Atomic Energy Authority (AEA) had encouraged major manufacturers of equipment – principally boilers and turbo-alternators – to form consortia to supply the nuclear power station contracts. The CEA was reluctant to give turnkey contracts to these consortia as it wished to retain control of design and ordering. Eventually the CEA vetted the designs but relied on the Atomic Energy Authority advice on the nuclear aspects.

The CEA were under pressure from government to accept a greater degree of future nuclear development than it thought was feasible. In 1956 the AEA considered that there were insufficient resources to meet 3,400 MW of future nuclear plant, but by the following year considered that 5,975 MW was possible. The CEA were concerned about the implications for their coal-fired programme and thought there would be an excessive surplus of coal-fired plant if the 6,000 MW nuclear power programme went ahead. It believed that 3,400 MW was a more realistic target. Nevertheless, in March 1957 the Cabinet approved a 6,000 MW programme of 19 nuclear power stations.

=== Research ===
The BEA had expanded the Central Electricity Research Laboratories at Leatherhead where the BEA/CEA had undertaken their own practical research on the ‘supergrid’, and on turbines and boilers. In the mid-1950s the CEA also commissioned research at universities on non-practical applications. These research contracts were placed on the advice of the authority's Research Council.

=== Financial statistics ===
The financial income and expenditure of the CEA over its two full financial operating years (in £ million) was as follows:

CEA financial summary
£ million	Year	
£ million	1955/6	1956/7
Combined trading results
Income from electricity sales	369.9	413.2
Other	21.1	11.4
Total	382.0	424.6
Expenditure	327.6	363.6
Operating profit	54.4	61.0
Interest	42.2	49.2
Profit after interest	12.2	11.7
Revenue account expenditure
Fuel	147.1	
Salaries	77.3	
Depreciation	58.3	
Interest	42.2	
Rates	16.2	
Other costs	28.7	
Total	369.8	
Capital expenditure
Generation	114.2	108.1
Main transmission	22.4	22.2
Other	0.6	0.7
Total	137.2	131.0
Area boards	76.1	75.2
Total	213.3	206.2

== Organisational review ==
The devolution of power exemplified in the Electricity Reorganisation (Scotland) Act 1954 did not satisfy some quarters of the Conservative government who were critical of the over-centralisation in the industry. In July 1954 the Minister of Fuel and Power, Geoffrey Lloyd, appointed a departmental committee, chaired by Sir Edwin Herbert, to examine the efficiency and organisation of the industry and to make recommendations.

The Herbert committee reported in January 1956 and found that the Central Electricity Authority’s dual roles of electricity generation and supervision had led to central concentration of responsibility and to duplication between headquarters and divisional staff which led to delays in the commissioning of new stations. The committee's recommendations were accepted by the government which enacted the Electricity Act 1957. This dissolved the Central Electricity Authority (and the Electricity Commissioners) and established the Electricity Council to oversee the industry and the Central Electricity Generating Board with responsibility for generation and transmission.

== See also ==
- Timeline of the UK electricity supply industry

== Bibliography ==
- "Report by UK Competition Commission on The South of Scotland Electricity Board" (PDF). Competition Commission. 1986. Archived from the original on 2005-03-02.
- Hannah, Leslie (1982). Engineers, Managers and Politicians: The First Fifteen Years of Nationalised Electricity Supply in Britain. London: Macmillan. ISBN 978-0-333-22087-0.
