= Francis Sumner (mayor) =

British mill owner

Francis James Sumner
- Born: 22 December 1807
- Died: 12 June 1884 (aged 76); London
- Occupation: Wren nest mill owner in glossop
- Known for: first mayor of Glossop

Francis James Sumner (22 December 1807 – 12 June 1884) was a Roman Catholic mill owner in Glossop. Sumner built a large business and served as Mayor of Glossop, and Deputy Lieutenant and High Sheriff of Derbyshire.

== Biography ==
Francis James Sumner was the son of Robert and Ann Sumner. His mother died young and his father remarried to the daughter of the agent of the Duke of Norfolk. When Sumner's father also died in 1817 he ended up living with his stepmother and her father at Glossop Hall. After his mother remarried to John Hardman, Sumner started working as piecer at Grove Mill (a.k.a. Old Silk Mill) and then at Wren Nest. In 1827 he bought Wren Nest Mill from his uncle Thomas Ellison, for 10,000 pounds. He was 22. He had inherited the money from his father's will. The mill had a rateable value of £91 and had 7000 spindles.

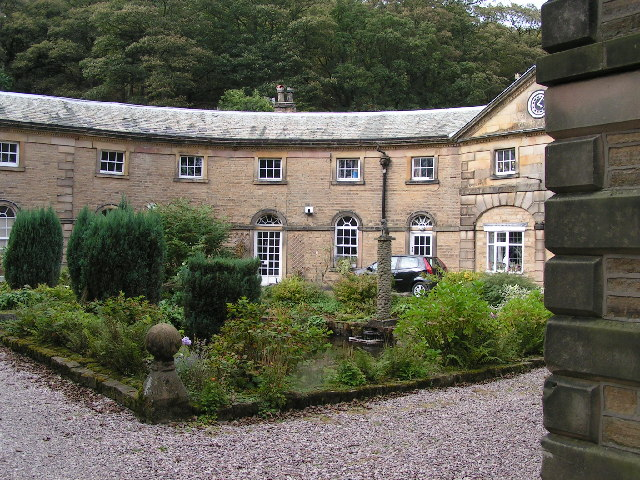
The stables of Park Hall in Hayfield

Catholicism was strong in Glossop because of the influence of the Howards and their estate staff, the Ellisons, Francis Hawke and John le Jardins. Sumner was a Whig and thus Liberal. Sumner moved to Glossop in October 1822.

His uncle Thomas Ellison had started the business and built the mill in 1815, and made extensions in 1815 and 1818, the latter incorporating an octagonal tower. Sumner first had possession of his uncle's business in 1827 and within two years he was extending the area of land he was renting as his number of spindles rose from 7,000 to over 9,500. Before 1829 the power had come from a water wheel but Sumner replaced with a steam engine. This allowed further expansion. He took over Wren Nest Farm and the farm buildings eventually became stables. The farm was consumed as he expanded his lands in 1829, 1839, 1847 1848, 1851, 1856 and 1857. Wrens Nest Mill employed 1400 people, operated 122,000 spindles and 2541 looms. Together with the Howardtown Mills and Waterside Mills, Hadfield; it dominated the Derbyshire cotton industry. As this was a Catholic run firm, many of the additional girls needed to run the mill, were brought over from Ireland.

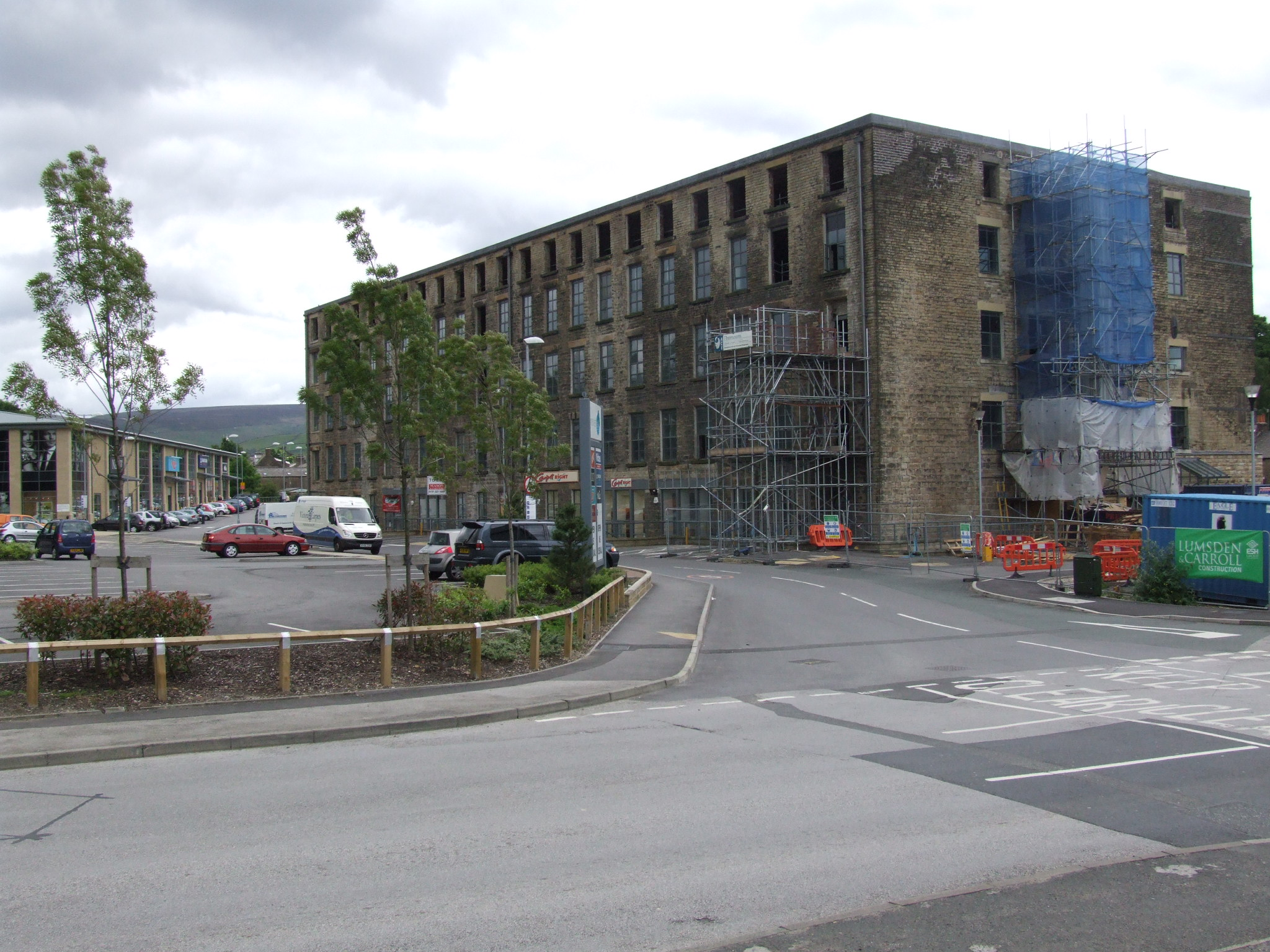
Wren' The one surviving block is Grade II listed and was converted into apartments with retail units at ground floor level in 2007.

In 1852 he involved himself in constructing a Roman Catholic school over the hill from Glossop in Hadfield. In 1857 he constructed his first residence, Wren Nest House, now on Sunlaws Street, Glossop, on higher ground overlooking the mill, which was common practice at the time. This is a substantial stone built property which was sold at auction after the closure of the Mill in 1957. It then became St Mary's Convent, linked to the new St Philip Howard catholic secondary school adjacent. After the convent closed it was sold into private hands in 2006 and subsequently extensively restored. Sumner later bought and extensively rebuilt Easton House on Sheffield road ( now the A57 Snake Pass ) to the east side of the town. This is a now in the ownership of the local council and has unfortunately had been left to decline into dereliction, but is now being converted into apartments. Sumner then became Glossop's first mayor. He was elected on Boxing Day in 1866 and treated every member of the council to a meal to celebrate his appointment. The following year he was appointed Justice of the Peace for the borough. In 1869 he bought a small weekend estate called Park Hall in Little Hayfield, the sort of residence that befitted his position as a cotton magnate He was then appointed a Deputy Lieutenant of Derbyshire, and in 1881, Sumner became the High Sheriff of Derbyshire.

He died in London in 1884 intestate. He was still a bachelor and without a will, his large business legally had to come to an immediate halt. Luckily his bankers were willing to find the salaries to keep it going until his cousins could decide how the inheritance should be managed. It had been one of Sumner's intention to build a Roman Catholic church in Glossop, plans were well advanced but his death meant the plans had to be reconsidered. With a few changes, the scheme continued though money was saved by abandoning the organ loft and the proposed steeple. The 12,000 pound St Mary's church was opened in August 1887 with the addition of a rectory two years later.

The Wren Nest mill ceased trading in 1955 and the one remaining building is only a small part of the original complex.

Park Hall still survives and the stable block is now run as a bed and breakfast business whilst Easton House built by the Sumner family in the 1920s and including stained glass bearing his monogram is now in a very poor state of repair.

== See also ==
- List of mills in Longdendale and Glossopdale

Honorary titles
Preceded by Francis William Newdigate	High Sheriff of Derbyshire; 1881–1882	Succeeded by Charles Edmund Newton
