= Howard Park, Glossop =

Public park in Glossop, Derbyshire, England

Howard Park
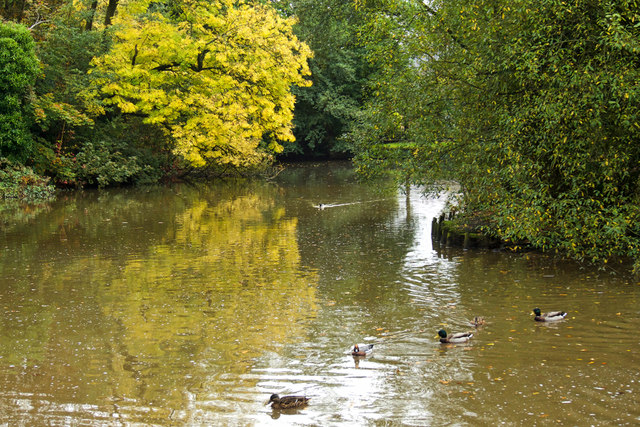
- Interactive map of Howard Park
- Location: Glossop, Derbyshire
- OS grid: SK 03061 94968
- Coordinates: 53°27′05″N 1°57′19″W
- Area: 5 hectares (12 acres)
- Opened: 1888
- Designer: Henry Ernest Milner
- Operator: High Peak Borough Council
- Designation: Grade II
- Website: www.highpeak.gov.uk/article/1665/Howard-Park-Glossop

Howard Park is a public park in Glossop, in Derbyshire, England. It was opened in 1888, and it is listed Grade II in Historic England's Register of Parks and Gardens.

== History ==
The park was created to celebrate the Golden Jubilee of Queen Victoria, and to benefit the people of Glossop. Samuel Wood, of the Wood family, owners of cotton mills and important employers in the town, paid for the enclosing and landscaping of the park, and for the building of baths, along with an endowment; his brother Daniel paid for the building of a hospital, with an endowment for its future. The site was given by Baron Howard of Glossop.

The park was designed by Henry Ernest Milner, and the baths, hospital and entrance lodges were designed by James Murgatroyd (1830–1894) of Mills and Murgatroyd, Manchester. Samuel and Daniel Wood both died in 1888, before the official opening of the park in June of that year.

Wood's Hospital was opened in January 1889, and Wood's Baths in February 1889. The hospital was owned by Glossop Borough Council to 1948, then by the NHS until 2014; it was afterwards renovated and became Reuben's Retreat, a charity where families of children with medical complexities can holiday.

== Description ==
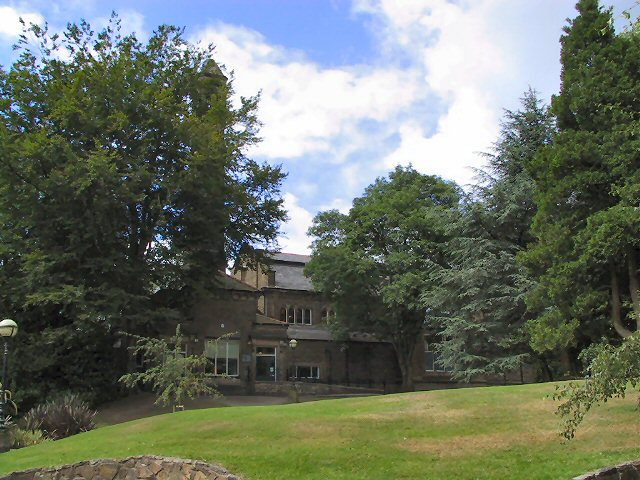
Wood's Baths, in Howard Park

The park is north-west of the town centre and covers about 5 hectares (12 acres). Park Crescent, created to provide a carriageway around the park, is an open boundary to the north and west. There are entrances from Dinting Road in the south, and at the north-east corner.

The layout of paths has changed little from the original design. There is a lake in the south of the park, near to Dinting Road. The land rises from south to north, and a stream, running through the centre of the park, is made into a series of pools and cascades. There are shrubs and trees, both deciduous and non-deciduous.

Wood's Baths, in the south-west corner, is in Italianate style with arched clerestory windows and a tall chimney. Wood's Hospital is a focal point on high ground in the north-west, with paths leading towards the building; the park was partly conceived as an environment for convalescent patients. Near the baths is the Wood Memorial, erected in 1889. From the north of the park there are views to the south and west, towards the town centre and surrounding countryside.

There are events and activities in the park, organised and run by the Friends of Howard Park.
