= Glossop =

Town in Derbyshire, England

Coordinates: 53.443°N 1.949°W

Glossop: Gateway to the Peak District
- Town
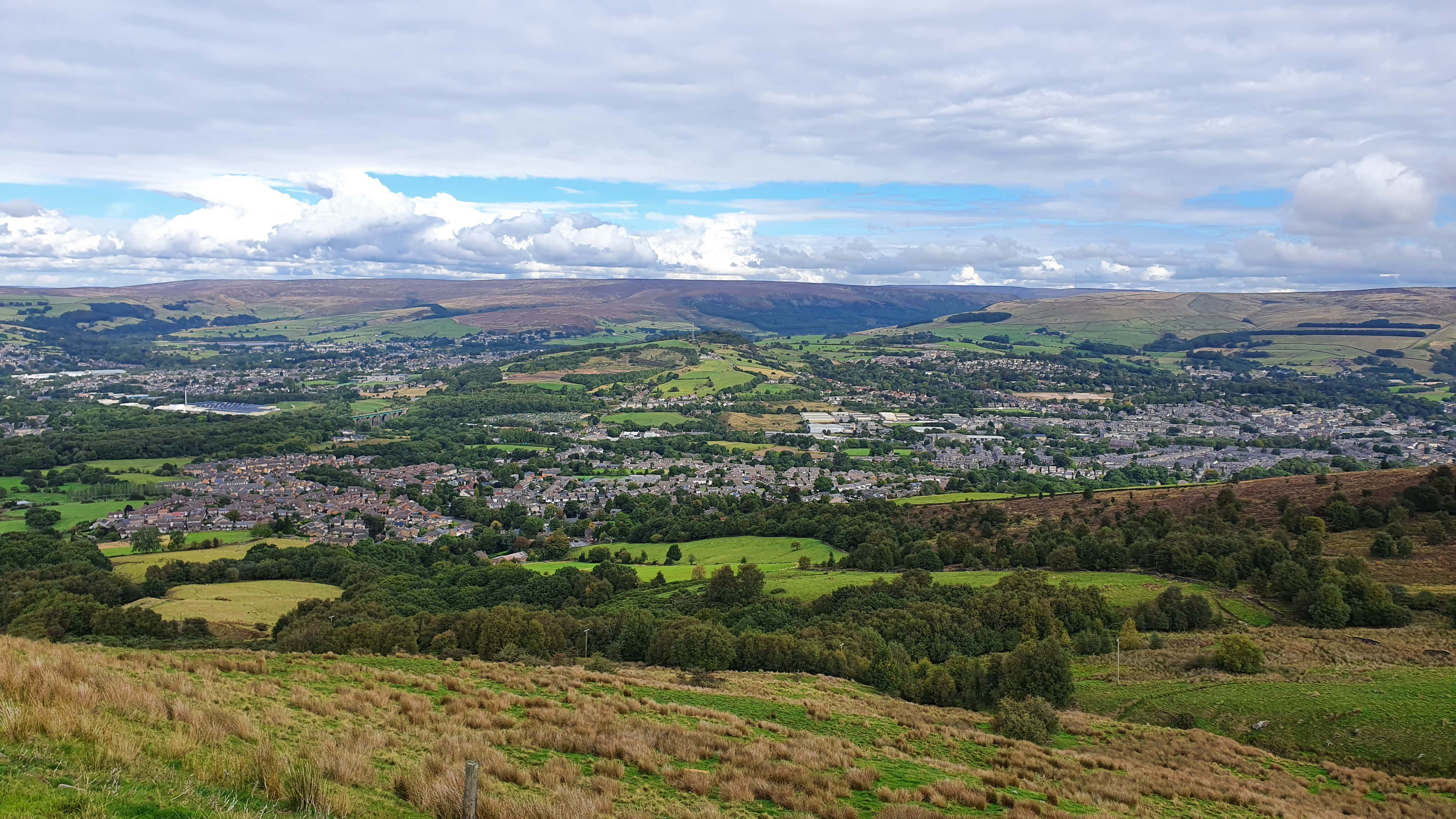
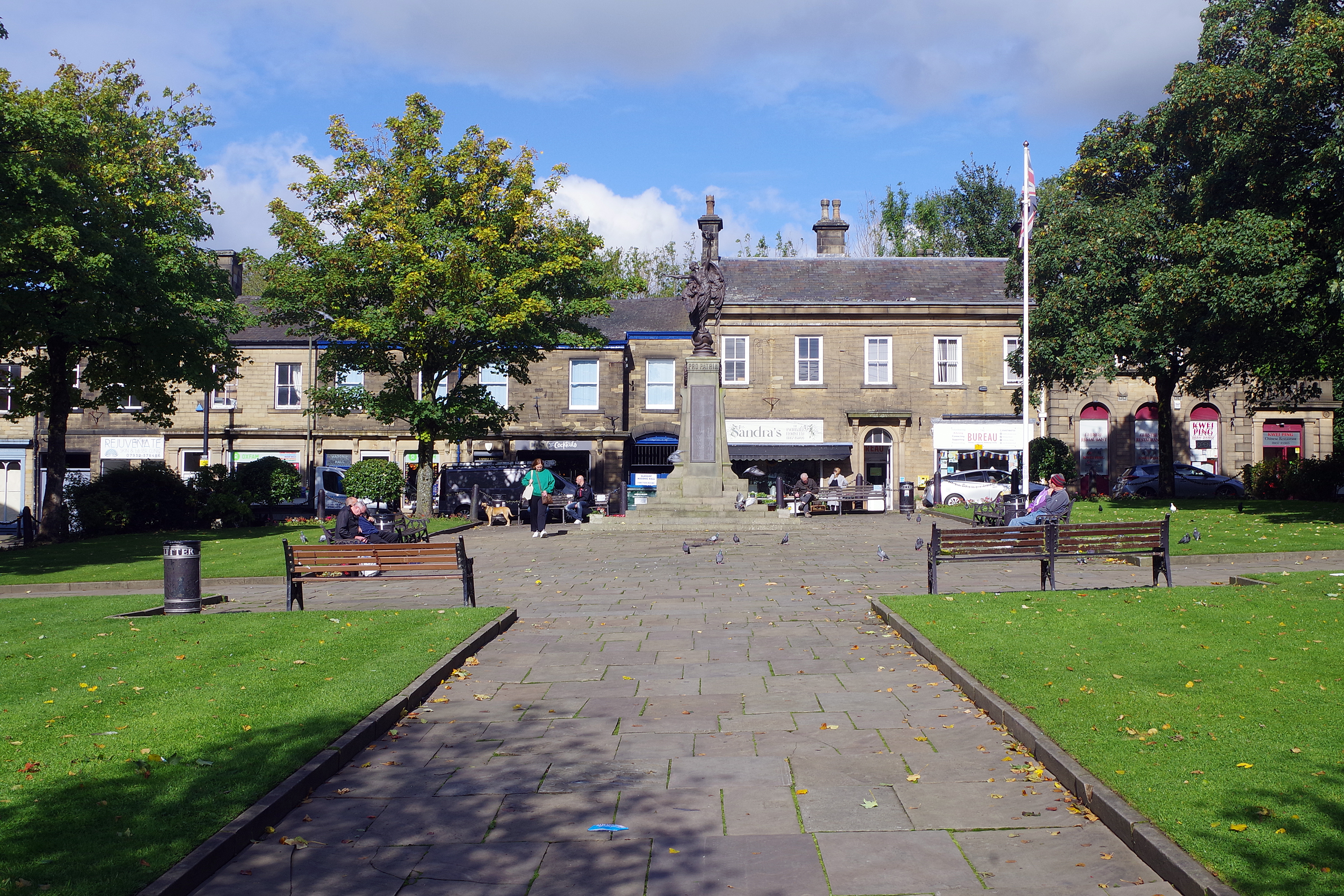
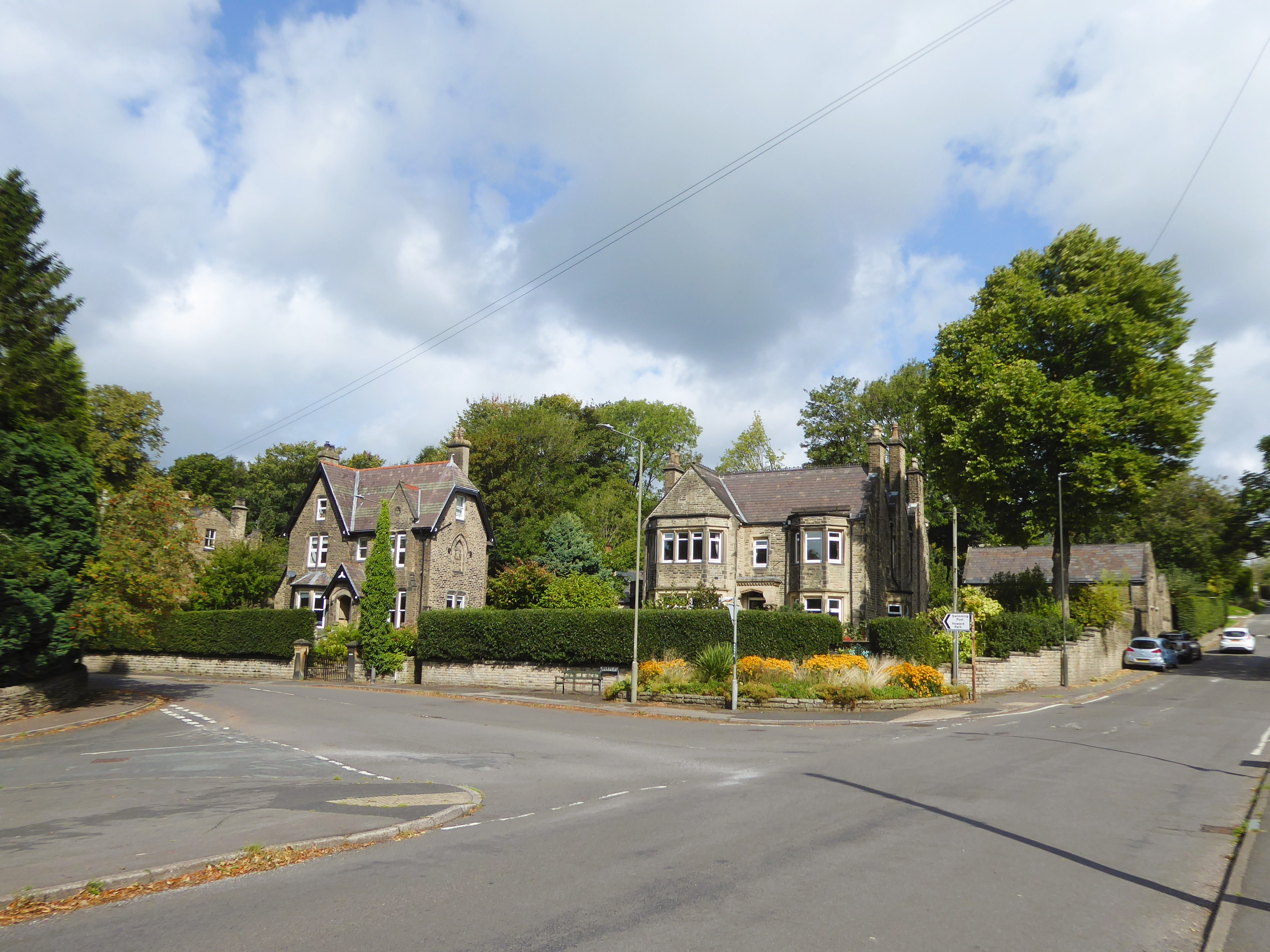
- A view of Glossop Norfolk Square Talbot Road

- Location within Derbyshire
- Population: 17,825 (2021 Census)
- OS grid reference: SK0393
- District: High Peak
- Shire county: Derbyshire
- Region: East Midlands
- Country: England
- Sovereign state: United Kingdom
- Post town: GLOSSOP
- Postcode district: SK13
- Dialling code: 01457
- Police: Derbyshire
- Fire: Derbyshire
- Ambulance: North West
- UK Parliament: High Peak

Glossop is a market town in the borough of High Peak, Derbyshire, England, 13 miles (21 km) east of Manchester, 24 miles (39 km) west-northwest of Sheffield and 32 miles (51 km) north-west of Matlock. Near Derbyshire's borders with Cheshire, Greater Manchester, South Yorkshire and West Yorkshire, between 150 and 300 metres (492 and 984 ft) above sea level, it is bounded by the Peak District National Park to the south, east and north. In 2021, it had a population of 17,825.

Historically, the name Glossop refers to the small hamlet that gave its name to an ancient parish recorded in the Domesday Book of 1086 and then the manor given by William I of England to William Peverel. A municipal borough was created in 1866, which encompassed less than half of the manor's territory. The area now known as Glossop approximates to the villages that used to be called Glossopdale, on the lands of the Duke of Norfolk. Originally a centre of wool processing, Glossop rapidly expanded in the late 18th century when it specialised in the production and printing of calico, a coarse cotton. It became a mill town with many chapels and churches; its fortunes were tied to the cotton industry.

Architecturally, the area is dominated by buildings constructed with the local sandstone; a number of these, including Glossop Gasworks, are grade II listed. Two significant former cotton mills and the Dinting railway viaduct remain.

== History ==
=== Toponymy and definition ===
The name Glossop is thought to be of Anglo-Saxon origin, named during the Angles' settlement in the 7th century, and derived from Glott's Hop—where hop could mean a valley, a small valley in a larger valley system, or a piece of land enclosed by marshes and Glott was probably a chieftain's name. Because of its size and location, Glossop had many definitions. The village of Glossop is now called Old Glossop. Howard Town and Milltown gained importance. They were named New Town and then Glossop. Local government reorganisations had caused the Glossopdale villages to be promoted to a municipal borough and then have that status removed. Land has been added to Glossop and other lands removed. From a small settlement it became an ancient parish, a manor, a borough and a township. Currently, two county divisions in High Peak Borough, Derbyshire, have Glossop as part of their names.

=== Ancient ===
There is evidence of a Bronze Age burial site on Shire Hill (near Old Glossop) and other possibly prehistoric remains at Torside (on the slopes of Bleaklow). The Romans arrived in 78 AD. At that time, the area was within the territory of the Brigantes tribe, whose main base was in Yorkshire. In the late 1st century the Romans built a fort, Ardotalia, on high ground above the river in present-day Gamesley. The site of this fort was rediscovered in 1771 by an amateur historian, John Watson. It subsequently acquired the name Melandra Castle. The extensive site has been excavated, revealing fort walls, a shrine and the fort headquarters. The area has been landscaped to provide parking and picnic areas.

=== Medieval ===
King William I awarded the manor of Glossop to William Peverel, who began construction of Glossop Castle, but the entire estate was later confiscated. In 1157 King Henry II gave the manor of Glossop to Basingwerk Abbey in Wales. They gained a market charter for Glossop in 1290, and one for Charlesworth in 1328. In 1433, the monks leased all of Glossopdale to the Talbot family, later Earls of Shrewsbury. In 1494, an illegitimate son of the family, Dr John Talbot, was appointed vicar of Glossop. He founded a school, and paved the packhorse route over the moors; this is known as Doctor's Gate.

At the Dissolution of the Monasteries in 1537 the manor of Glossop was given to the Talbot family. In 1606 it came into the ownership of the Howard family, the Dukes of Norfolk, who held it for the next 300 years. Glossop was usually given to the second son of the family. The land was too wet and cold to be used for wheat but was ideal for the hardy Pennine sheep, so agriculture was predominantly pastoral. Most of the land was owned by the Howards and was leasehold and it was only in Whitfield that there was any freehold land. The few houses were solid, built of the local stone, and allowed for the development of home industries such as wool spinning and weaving.

=== Industrial and civic history ===
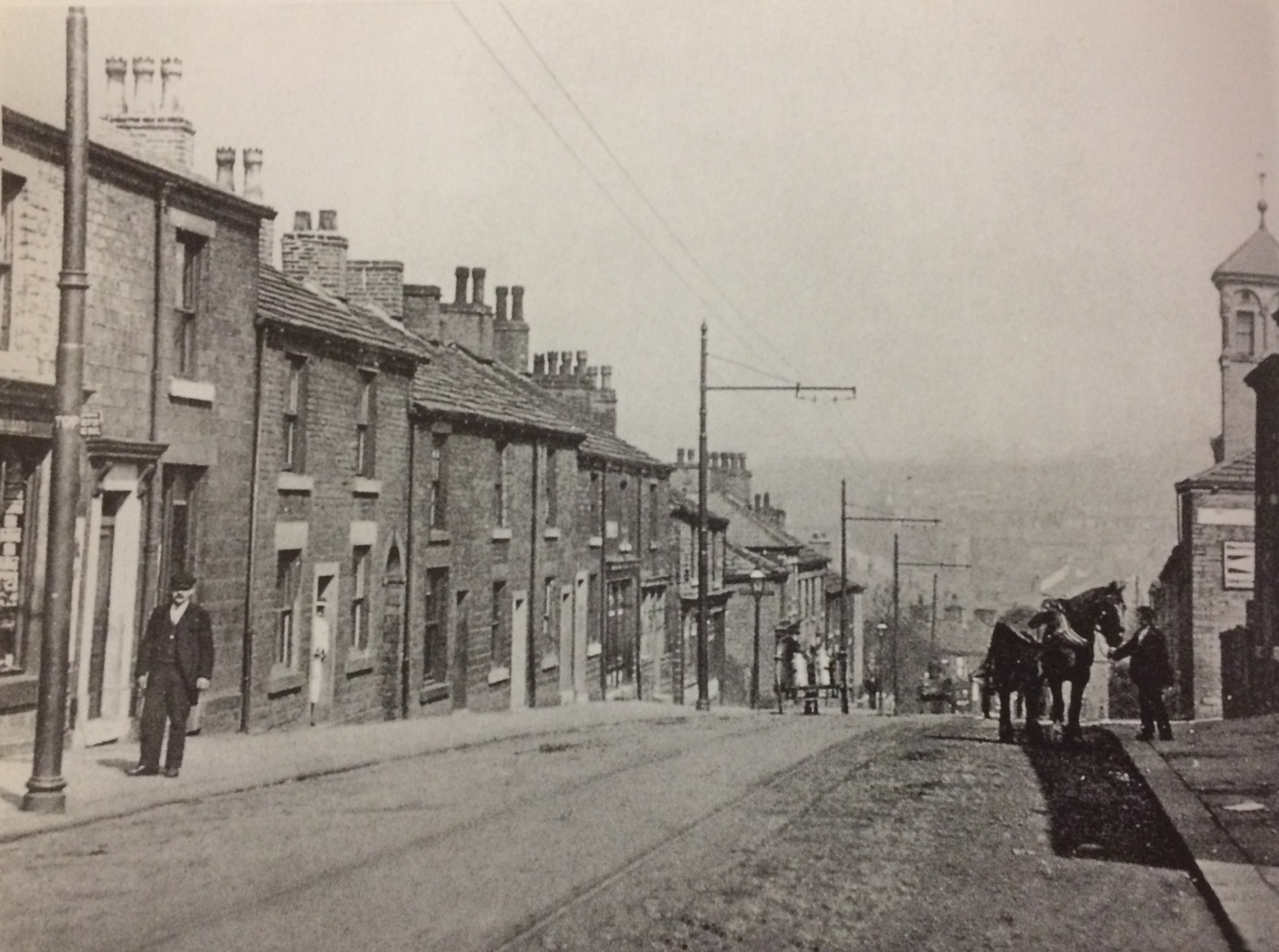
Victoria Street c. 1920 showing the electric tramway that operated until 1927

The medieval economy was based on sheep pasture and the production of wool by farmers who were tenants of the Abbot of Basingwerk and later the Talbot family. During the Industrial Revolution of the 18th century Glossop became a centre for cotton spinning. A good transport network between Liverpool and Glossop brought in imported cotton which was spun by a labour force with wool spinning skills. The climate of Glossopdale provided abundant soft water that was used to power mills and finish the cloth, and also gave the humidity necessary to spin cotton under tension. Initial investment was provided by the Dukes of Norfolk. By 1740, cotton in an unspun form had been introduced to make fustians and lighter cloths.

==== Mills ====
The first mills in Glossop were woollen mills. In 1774, Richard Arkwright opened a mill at Cromford. He developed the factory system and patented machines for spinning cotton and carding. In 1785, his patents expired and many people copied Arkwright's system and his patents, exemplified by the Derwent Valley Mills. By 1788 there were over 200 Arkwright-type mills in Britain. At the same time there were 17 cotton mills in Derbyshire, principally in Glossop. By 1831 there were at least 30 mills in Glossopdale, none of which had more than 1,000 spindles. The mill owners were local men: the Wagstaffs and Hadfields were freeholders from Whitfield; the Shepleys, Shaws, Lees, Garlicks and Platts had farmed the dale. The Sidebottoms were from Hadfield, the Thornleys were carpenters and John Bennet and John Robinson were clothiers. John Wood of Marsden came from Manchester in 1819 and bought existing woollen mills which he expanded. These were the Howard Town mills. Francis Sumner was a Catholic whose family had connections with Matthew Ellison, Howard's agent. He built Wren Nest Mill. The Sidebottoms built the Waterside Mill at Hadfield. In 1825, John Wood installed the first steam engine and power looms. Sumner and Sidebottom followed suit and the three mills, Wren Nest, Howardtown and Waterside, became very large vertical combines (a vertical combine was a mill that both spun the yarn and then used it to weave cloth). With the other major families, the Shepleys, Rhodes and Platts, they dominated the dale. In 1884, the six had 82% of the spinning capacity with 892,000 spindles and 13,571 looms. Glossop was a town of very large calico mills. The Glossop Tramway was opened in 1903 to connect workers to the various mills along the main routes between Glossop and Hadfield.

The calico printing factory of Edmund Potter (located in Dinting Vale) in the 1850s printed 2½ million pieces of printed calico, of which 80% was for export. The paper industry was created by Edward Partington who, as Olive and Partington, bought the Turn Lee Mill in 1874 to produce high-quality paper from wood pulp by the sulphite method. He expanded rapidly with mills in Salford and Barrow-in-Furness. He merged with Kellner of Vienna and was created Lord Doverdale in 1917. He died in 1925; his factories in Charlestown created nearly 1,000 jobs.

==== Religion and benevolence ====
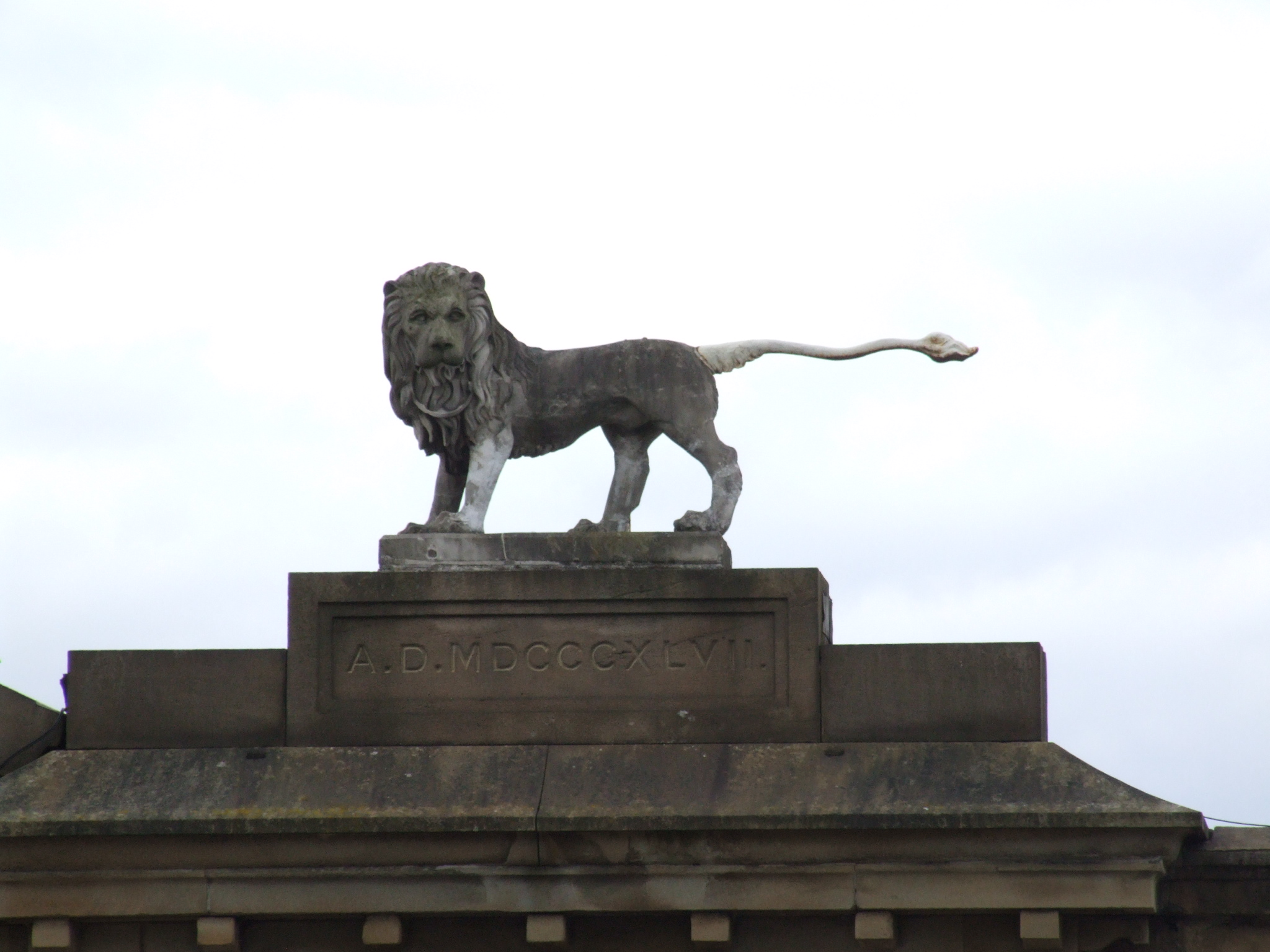
Norfolks' Lion

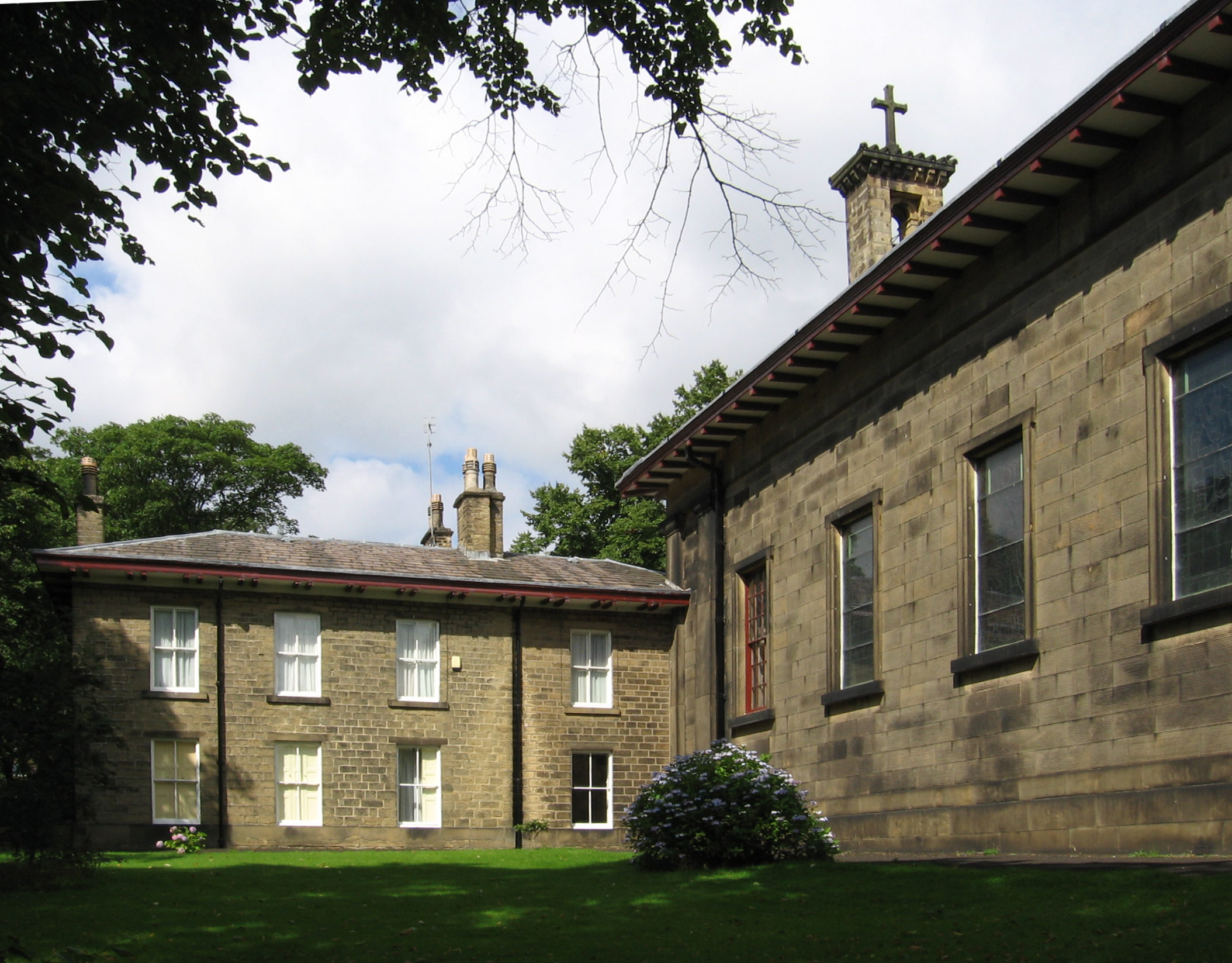
All Saints' Roman Catholic Chapel

Bernard Howard, 12th Duke of Norfolk, rebuilt the old parish church in 1831, built All Saints Roman Catholic chapel in 1836, improved the Hurst Reservoir in 1837, built a primary school next to the church, and built the Town Hall, whose foundation stone was laid on Coronation Day 1838.

The Sheffield, Ashton-under-Lyne and Manchester Railway came to Dinting in 1842, but it was the 13th Duke of Norfolk who built the spur line to Howard Town, so that coal could be brought from the collieries at Dukinfield. Glossop railway station bears the lion, the symbol of the Norfolks. Many of the street- and placenames in Glossop derive from the names and titles of the Dukes of Norfolk, such as Norfolk Square, and a cluster of residential streets off Norfolk Street that were named after Henry Howard, 13th Duke of Norfolk, the first Catholic MP since the Reformation. (His second son was created 1st Baron Howard of Glossop and was ancestor of the post-1975 dukes.)

A two-storey Township Workhouse was built between 1832 and 1834 on Bute Street (grid reference SK043952). Its administration was taken over by Glossop Poor Law Union in December 1837. The workhouse buildings included a 40-bed infirmary, piggeries and casual wards for vagrants. The workhouse later became Glossop Public Assistance Institution and from 1948 the NHS Shire Hill Hospital.

The mill owners, Catholics, Anglican, Methodist and Unitarian, built reading rooms and chapels. They worked together and worshipped together with their workers. The Woods, Sidebottoms and Shepleys were Anglicans and hence Tory, and they dominated every vestry, which was the only form of local government before 1866. They built four churches: St James's, Whitfield, in 1846; St Andrew's, Hadfield, in 1874; Holy Trinity, Dinting, in 1875; and St Luke's, Glossop. Francis Sumner and the Ellisons and Norfolks were Catholic and built St Charles's, Hadfield, and St Mary's, Glossop. The smaller mill owners were Dissenters and congregated at Littlemoor Independent Chapel built in Hadfield in 1811, but they later built a further eleven chapels.

For decades there was rivalry between Edward Partington, his friend Herbert Rhodes, and the Woods and Sidebottoms. The Woods built the public baths and laid out the park. Partington built the library. Partington built the cricket pavilion, so Samuel Hill-Wood sponsored the football club that for one season, 1899–1900, played in League Division One. He and his descendants went on to be chairmen of the London club Arsenal. He was MP for High Peak from 1910 to 1929. Edward's son, Oswald, was MP for High Peak from 1900 to 1910. Ann Kershaw Woods devoted herself to Anglican education and had schools built.

==== Cotton famine and industrial relations ====
In 1851, 38% of the men and 27% of the women were employed in cotton; the only alternative employment was agriculture, building, or labouring on the railway. Consequently, the town was vulnerable to interruptions in the supply of cotton or the export trade. The American Civil War caused the cotton famine of 1861–64. The mill owners met together and put in place a relief programme through which they supplied food, clogs and coal to their employees. Howard increased the workforce on his estate, and public works (such as improving the domestic water supply) were undertaken. They provided unsecured loans to the workers until the cotton returned. The relationship between the owners and men was one of paternal benevolence. They lived in the same community and worshipped in the same churches. The mill owners were the local aldermen, the church elders and led the sports teams. In the Luddite and Chartist times and the period following Peterloo, Glossop was virtually unaffected, despite its proximity to Hyde, a radical hotbed. In the '4s 2d or swing strike' it was incomers from Ashton who stopped the Glossop mills. The rivalry in Glossop was not based on class but on religious groups.

=== Modern (20th and 21st centuries) ===
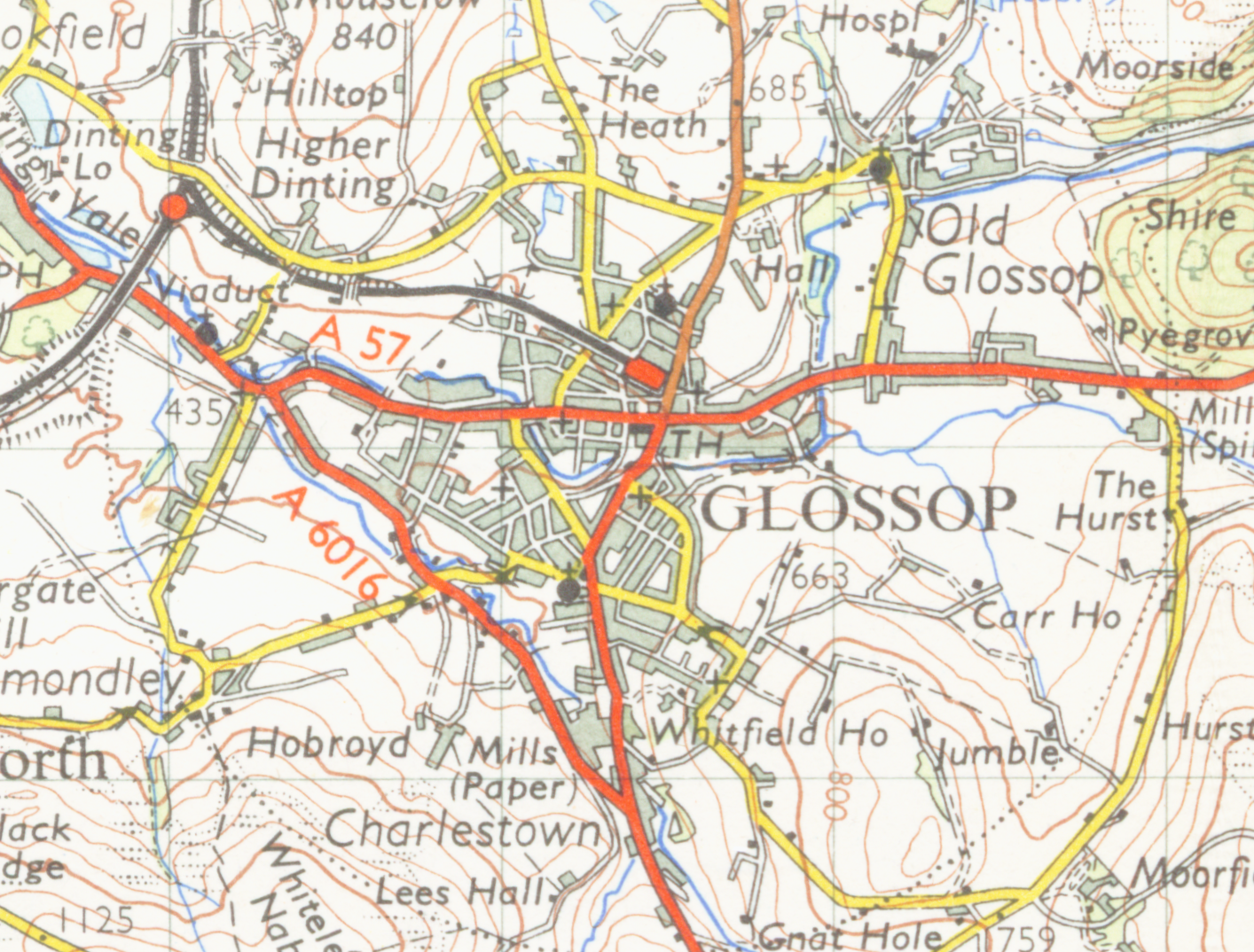
Map of Glossop from 1954

The decline of cotton spinning has resulted in the closure of many of the town's mills. The Howard family sold the Glossop Estate in 1925 and donated large areas to the people of Glossop. Manor Park was the location of the family's manor house and gardens. The recession of 1929 hit Glossop very hard: in 1929 the unemployment rate was 14%, and in 1931 it was 55%. In Hadfield it reached 67%. National initiatives to improve housing and employment conditions largely failed, and mills fell empty and decayed. Unemployment remained at 36% in 1938. The Second World War changed this: military stores, metals, machine tools, munitions, rubber and essential industries moved into the empty factories and left Glossop with a more diverse range of industries.

In spite of the Barlow Report and government intervention, no significant employer moved into Glossop.

Gamesley underwent considerable change in the 1960s, when a large council estate was built, mainly to house people from Manchester. These housing areas, called 'overspill estates', were also built in other towns surrounding Manchester.

=== Plans ===
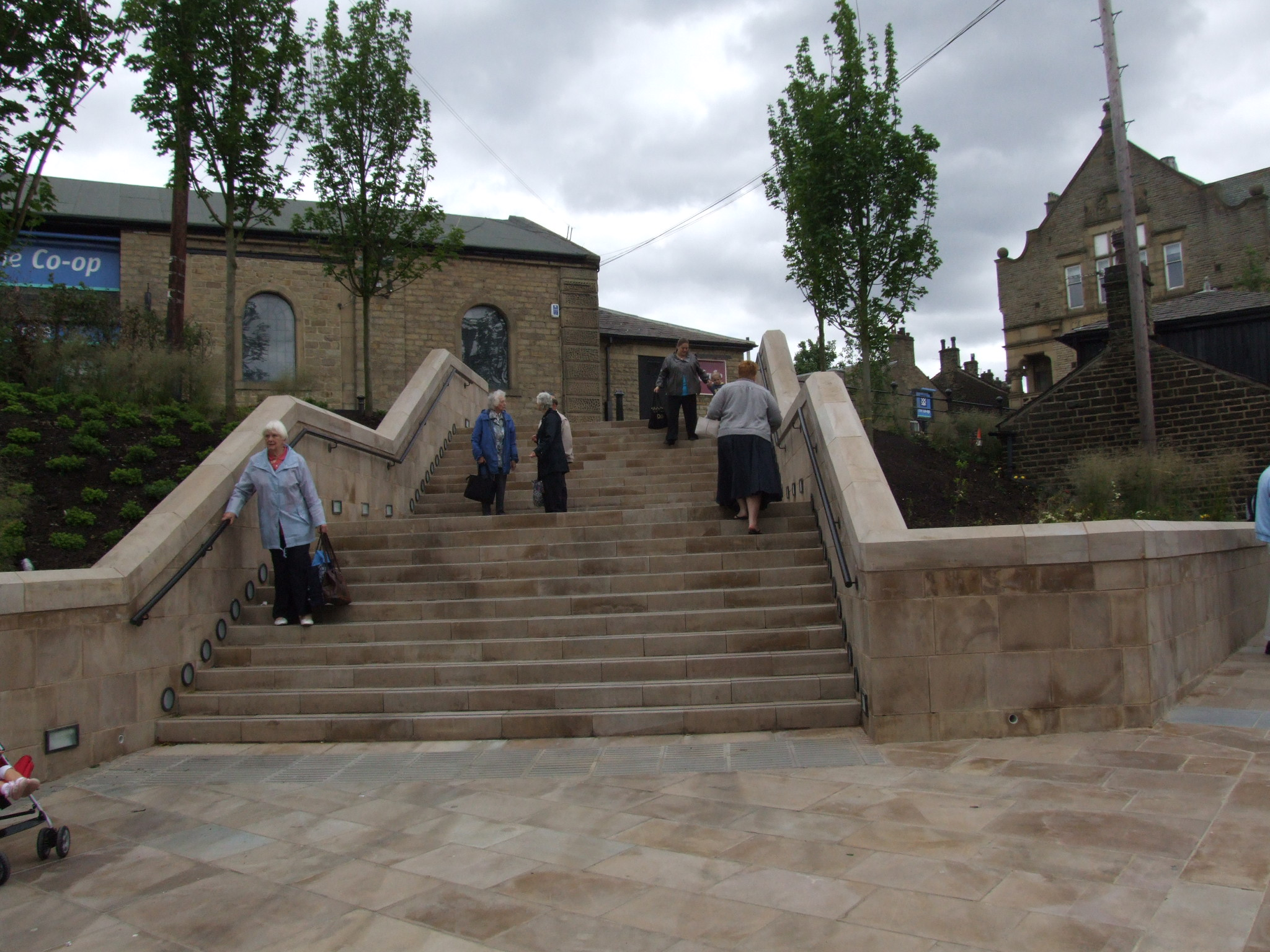
Henry Street Staircase realised through Glossop Vision

Glossop has been included as pilot in the Liveability scheme, and has drawn up the Glossop Vision masterplan for the improvement and gentrification of the town. This is being partially funded by the Heritage Lottery Fund. It aims to open up access to the Glossop Brook, to coordinate developments in Glossop town centre, to enhance the built environment and to link the town to its wider setting. As such, the mills have become a retail development with housing, trees are to be planted along the A57 and the market square has been pedestrianised.

== Governance ==
Coat of arms of Glossop Borough Council, granted in 1919. The arms became obsolete with the council's abolition in 1974.

In the local government reorganisation of 1974 the Municipal Borough of Glossop was abolished, and since then the two levels of local government are Derbyshire County Council, based in Matlock, and High Peak Borough Council then based in Chapel-en-le-Frith.

Glossop was included in the "South East Lancashire Special Review Area" under the Local Government Act 1958, and the Redcliffe-Maud Report of 1969 recommended its inclusion in a South East Lancashire–North East Cheshire metropolitan area. Glossop was not ultimately included in the Greater Manchester area established by the Local Government Act 1972, with the residents voting to remain in Derbyshire in 1973. The county council, originally based in Derby, moved to Matlock in the late 1950s to facilitate easier travelling to the county hall from the northern extremities such as Glossop and the High Peak.

For the county council, Glossop is split between the divisions of Glossop and Charlesworth (electing two councillors), and Etherow (electing one councillor). Etherow division contains Hadfield North, Hadfield South, Gamesley and the large and sparsely populated Tintwistle ward, which was formerly in Cheshire. These boundaries were set in 2013.

At the district level, that is High Peak Borough Council, Glossop comprises these wards: Dinting, Gamesley, Hadfield North, Hadfield South, Old Glossop, Padfield, Howard Town, Simmondley and Whitfield. St John's represents the rural area that was formerly Glossopdale RDC and lies within the National Park. These were the wards used in the 2001 Census.

Glossop itself does not have a parish council, but Tintwistle and St John's are parished.

The Member of Parliament for the High Peak constituency since 2024 has been Jon Pearce.

=== Historic Glossop ===
A map of the different areas that have held the name Glossop.

Historically, the ancient parish of Glossop consisted of the ten townships of the manor: Glossop, Hadfield, Padfield, Dinting, Simmondley, Whitfield, Chunal, Charlesworth, Chisworth, Ludworth and nine more: Mellor, Thornsett, Rowarth, Whittle (Whitle), Beard, Ollersett, Hayfield, Little Hayfield, Phoside, Kinder, Bugsworth, Brownside and Chinley. Within the parish were the chapelries of Hayfield and Mellor. The ancient parish was in the Hundred of High Peak; it was about 16 miles (26 km) long and 5 miles (8 km) wide, with an area of 31,876 acres (12,900 hectares). Beard, Ollerset, Thornsett, Rowarth and Whitle later formed the town of New Mills, while Hayfield, Little Hayfield, Phoside and Kinder joined the parish of Hayfield. The chapelry of Mellor included Mellor, Chisworth, Ludworth, Whittle and part of Thornsett.

The Manor of Glossop was made up of the territory that includes Hadfield, Padfield, Dinting, Simmondley, Whitfield, Chunal, Charlesworth, Chisworth, Ludworth and the village of Glossop, now called Old Glossop. It had an area of 11,308 acres (4,576 hectares), of which more than 8,000 acres (3,000 hectares) were classed as moorland.

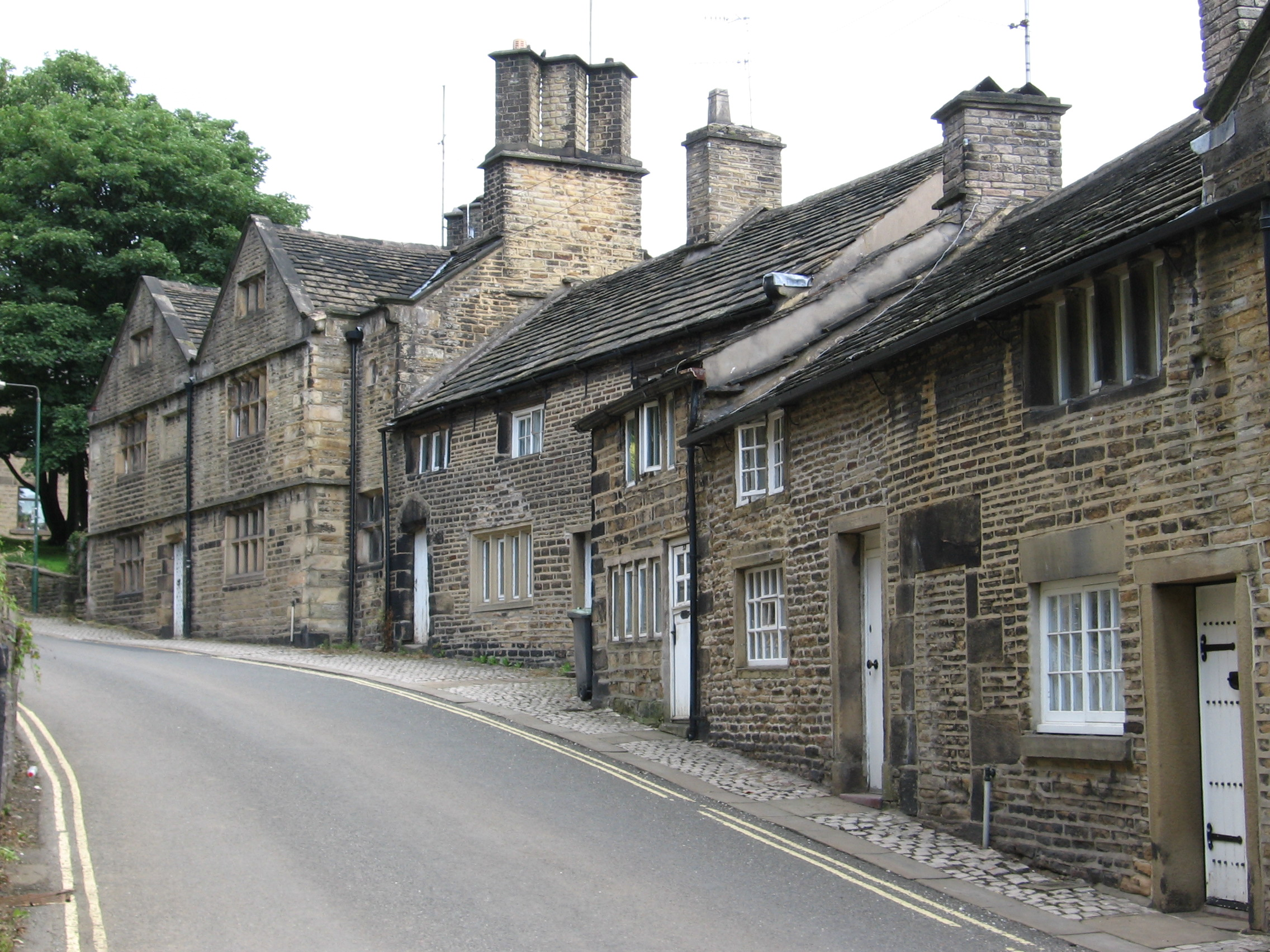
Church Street in Old Glossop

The Municipal Borough of Glossop (1866–1974) contained the land within two miles (three kilometres) of the town hall in Howard Town and a sliver to the north bounded by the River Etherow, an area of 3,052 acres (1,235 hectares). It is cited as an example of a 'millocracy' as two-thirds of the elected councillors were mill owners. The remaining parishes of Charlesworth, Chisworth and Ludworth formed Glossopdale Rural District, which remained in existence until 1934 when the parishes were split, Ludworth going into Marple RDC, Chisworth and the greater part of Charlesworth joining Chapel en le Frith RDC and the smaller part—271 acres (110 hectares)—joining Glossop.

The present community of Glossop is centred on Howardtown. It is served by the Glossopdale Area Forum and the Glossop Town Partnership. The previous hamlet of Glossop is now known as Old Glossop.

== Geography ==
Glossop is at the north-western extreme of England's East Midlands region, 184 miles (296 km) north-west of London, 13 miles (21 km) east of the city of Manchester, 24 miles (39 km) west-northwest of the city of Sheffield and 48 miles (77 km) north-east of Derby. It nestles in the foothills of the Pennines, with Bleaklow to the north-east and Kinder Scout to the south. It lies on Glossop Brook, a tributary of the River Etherow, in the area of peat moorland commonly known as the Dark Peak. The moors, which rise to over 1,960 feet (600 metres), are cut by many deep V-shaped valleys known as cloughs, each formed by a stream known as a brook. Shelf Brook passes through Old Glossop where it joins Hurst Brook to form Glossop Brook, which passes westward through Milltown, Howard Town and Dinting to the River Etherow, which in turn runs south to join the River Goyt at Marple Bridge. Two other notable brooks are Padfield Brook and Gnat Hole Brook.

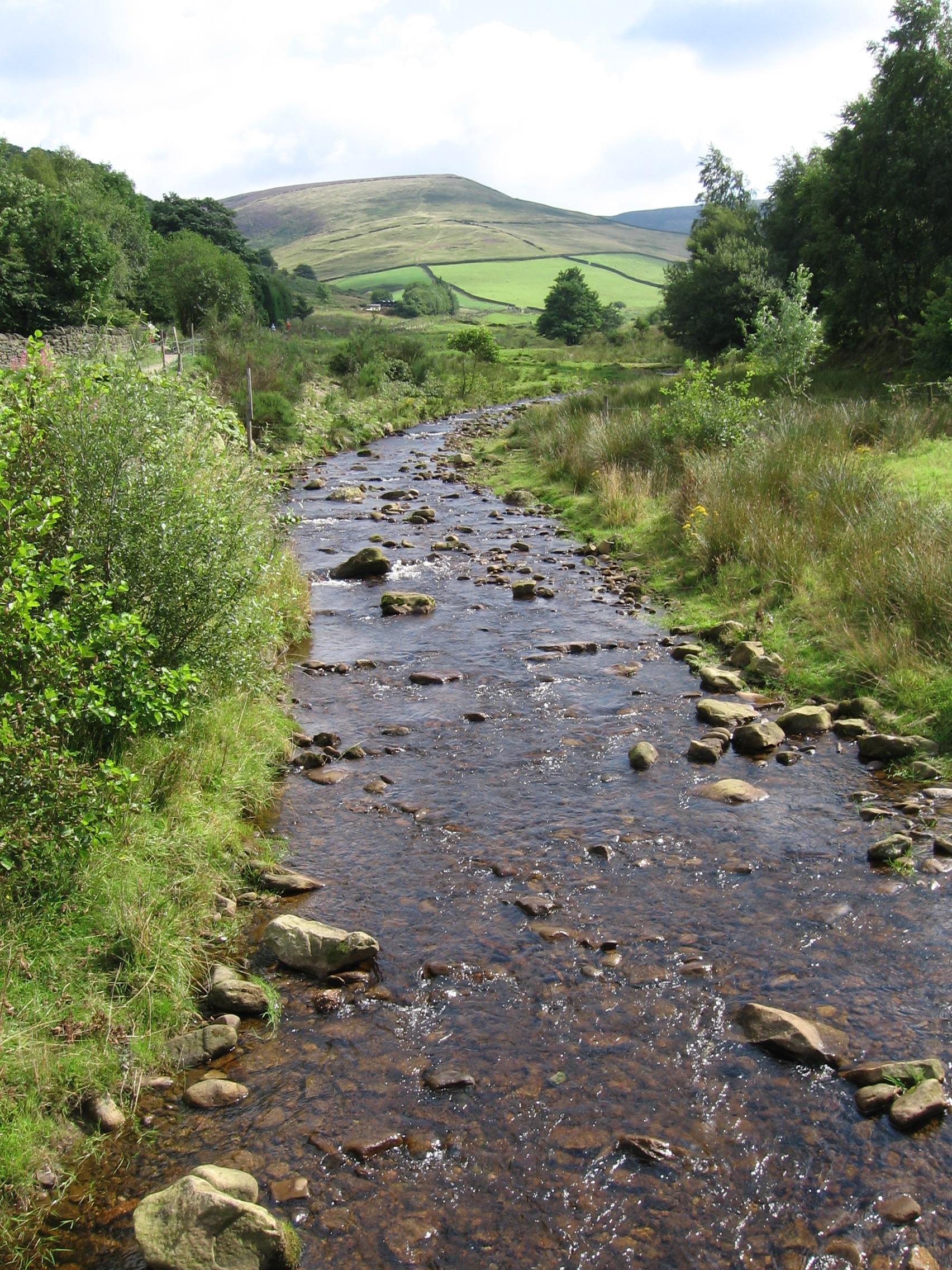
Shelf Brook

Shelf Brook leads from Shelf Moor on Bleaklow down Doctor's Gate through Old Glossop to Glossop Brook. The valley was used by the Romans for a road, and currently contains a bridleway. The north slope of Holden Clough and Hurst Brook is used by the A57 road known as the Snake Pass. The Snake Pass crosses the Pennine Way near Doctor's Gate Culvert (1,680 ft or 510 m above sea level) before descending to the east to Ladybower Reservoir along the northern side of the River Ashop valley. Here a road leads east over Hallam Moor into Sheffield, and south along the River Derwent into Baslow and Matlock. To the north of Glossop is Tintwistle; the River Etherow is the boundary. Today, the Longdendale valley forms a chain of reservoirs that provide drinking water for Manchester. At the head of the valley is Woodhead, where the road from Huddersfield joins the road to Sheffield, and a three-mile (five-kilometre) railway tunnel brought the railway from Penistone.

=== Geology ===
Schematic diagram of the rocks beneath Glossop

Directly beneath Glossop lie areas of Carboniferous Millstone Grit, shales and sandstone. Glossop is on the edge of the Peak District Dome, at the southern edge of the Pennine anticline. The Variscan uplift has caused much faulting and Glossopdale was the product of glacial action in the last glaciation period that exploited the weakened rocks. The steep-sided valleys of the cloughs cause significant erosion and deposition. The layers of sandstone, mudstones and shale in the bedrock act as an aquifer to feed the springs. The valley bottoms have a thin deposit of boulder clay. The brooks are fed by the peaty soils of the moors thus are acid (pH5.5–7.0); this means the instream wildlife is dependent on food sources from outside the channel.

=== Climate ===
Glossop experiences a temperate maritime climate, like much of the British Isles, with relatively cool summers and mild winters. There is regular but generally light precipitation throughout the year. Glossop has a history of flash flooding, the most recent being in 2002 when High Street West was flooded to a depth of 3 feet (1 m).

== Demography ==
Glossop demographics were recorded as the following:

Year	1801	1811	1821	1831	1839	1851	1861	1871	1881	1891
Population Glossop	3,625	4,012*	6,212	9,631	14,577	19,587	21,000	20,673	19,574	22,416
Glossop and Charlesworth	2,759	4,012*	5,135	7,897	12,569	17,454	19,126	18,508	21,393	23,493
Source: Vision of Britain through Time; Source: Small Town Politics, 1959, A. H. Birch. pub OUP * Data set includes Chisworth and Ludworth

Year	1901	1911	1921	1931	1939	1951	1961	1971	2001
Population	21,520	21,688	20,531	19,509	estimate 23,500	18,994	17,500	24,272	32,428
Source: A Vision of Britain through Time

== Economy ==
Glossop was a product of the wealth of the cotton industry. Glossop's economy was linked closely with a spinning and weaving tradition that had evolved from developments in textile manufacture during the Industrial Revolution. Before the First World War, Glossop had the headquarters of an international paper empire, the largest calico printworks in the world, a large bleach works and six spinning weaving combines with over 600,000 spindles and 12,000 looms and two niche manufacturers: grindstones and industrial belts. In the 1920s, these firms were refloated on the easily available share capital—thus were victims of the stock market crash of 1929. Their product lines were vulnerable to the new economic conditions.

The main street contains a variety of shops, restaurants and food outlets.

Glossop is located close to the border of the Peak National Park, and to the east are the open moorlands of the Dark Peak. The local economy benefits from the many thousands of tourists who visit the park each year and who use Glossop as the "Gateway to the Peak".

== Landmarks ==
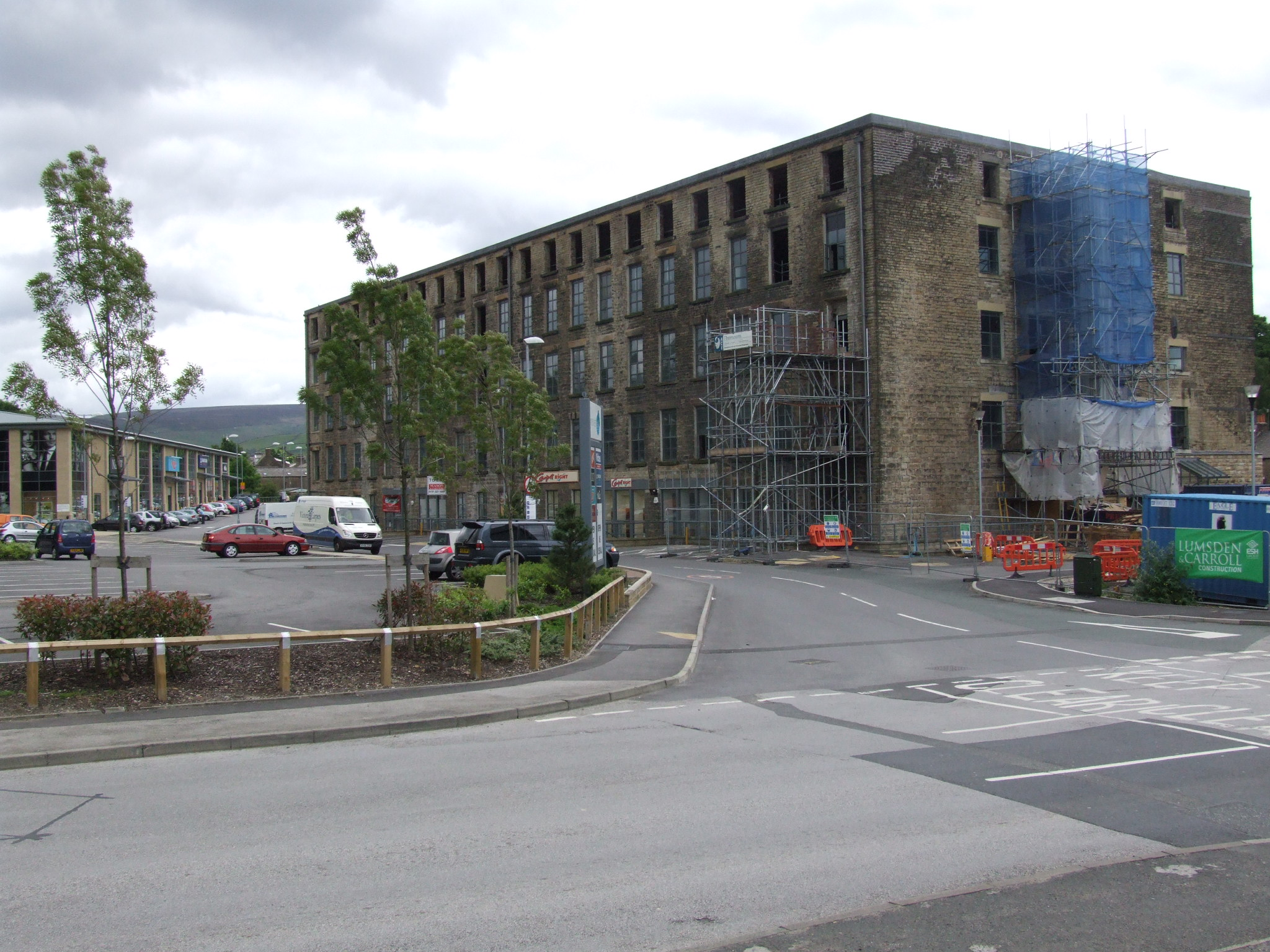
Wren Nest Mill being restored, with new retail development behind

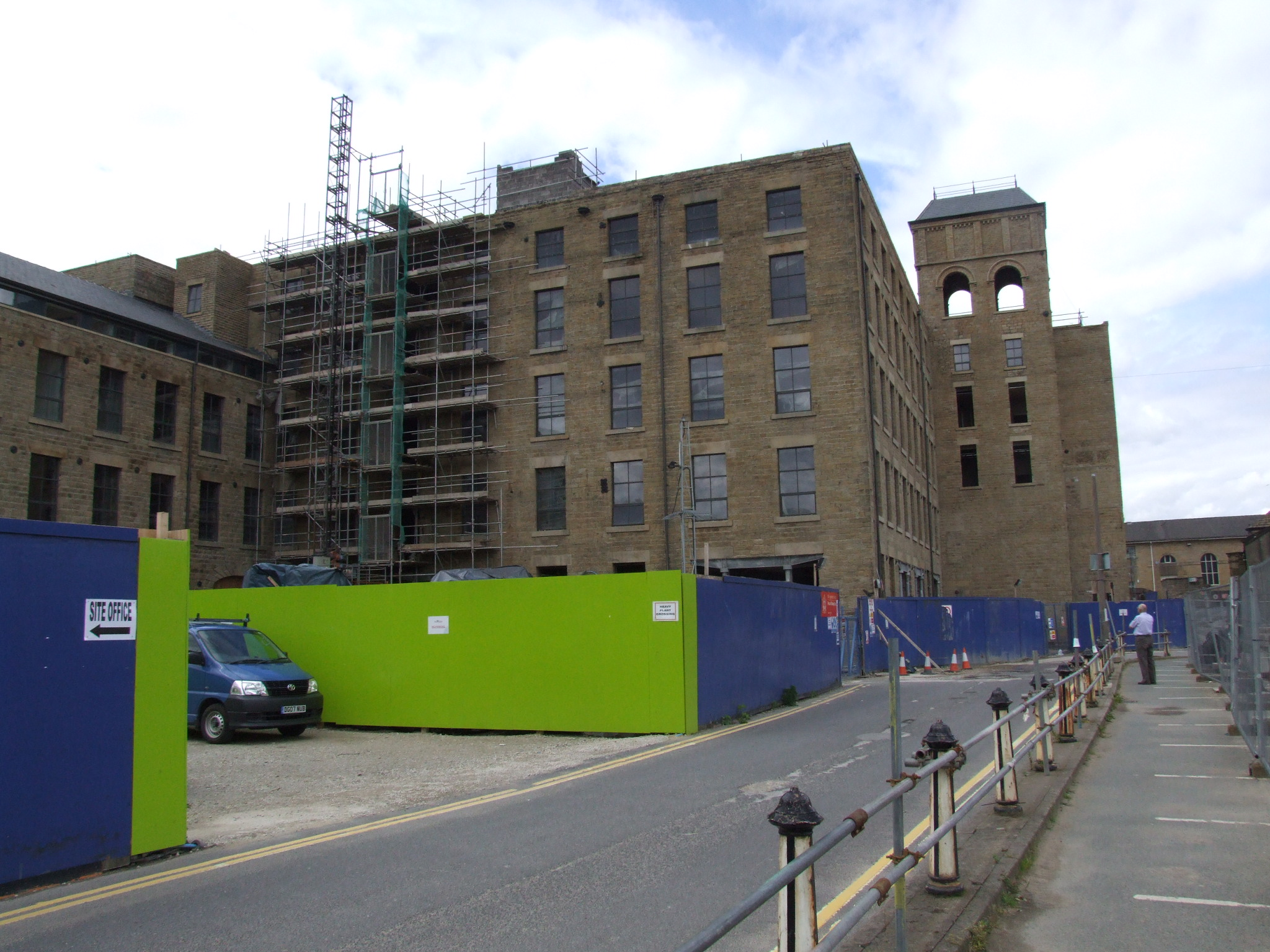
Howard Town Mill being restored

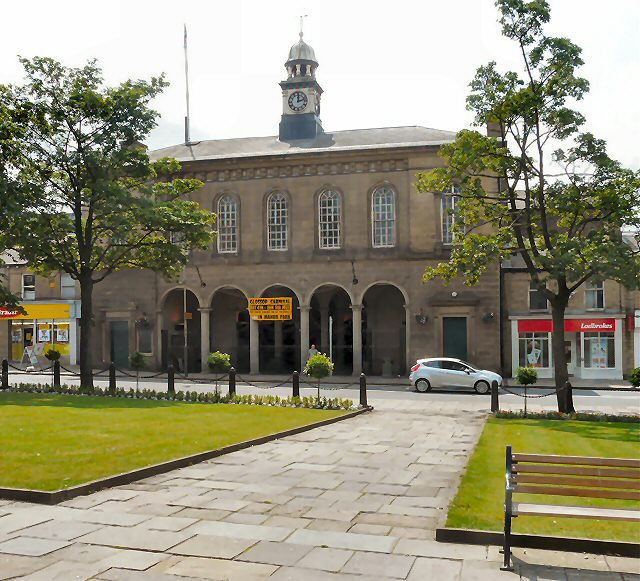
Glossop Town Hall

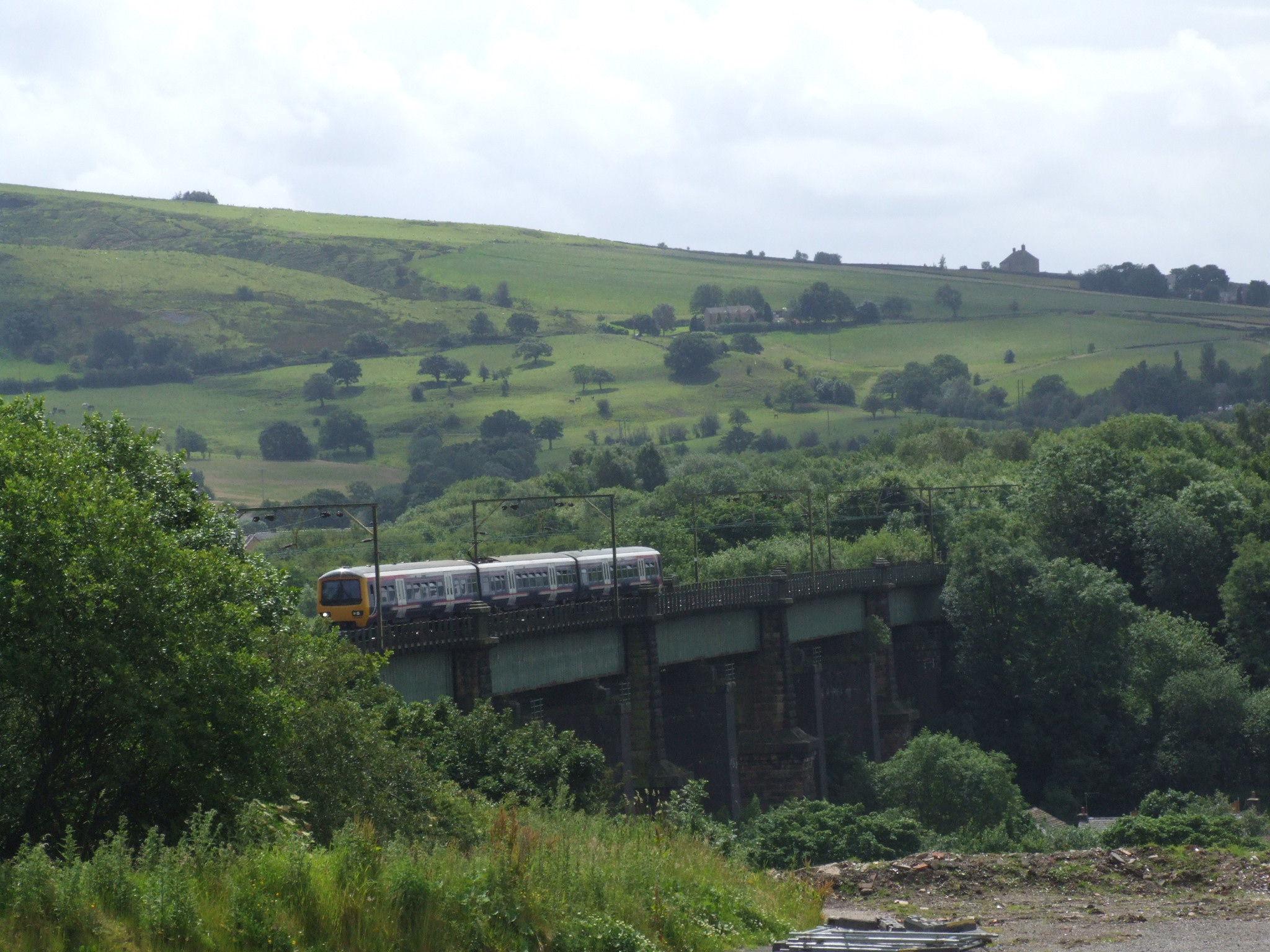
Dinting Viaduct

=== Wren Nest Mill ===
Wren Nest Mill on High Street West was built c. 1800–10, with further extensions in 1815 and 1818, the latter incorporating an octagonal tower. The present building is a small part of the original complex, which in its heyday employed 1,400 workers operating 123,000 spindles and 2,541 looms. It ceased trading in 1955. A major fire in 1996 destroyed half the mill. The remaining half has been redeveloped into flats and retail units.

=== Wood's Mill, Howardtown Mills, Milltown Mills ===
From a group of small mills at Bridge End, John Wood built a complex of mills. Bridge End Mill was originally built in 1782 as a fulling mill. Today one mill building is being restored, and the Milltown mills lie idle.

=== Town Hall ===
Glossop Town Hall and Market Hall was designed in Italianate style by Sheffield architects Weightman and Hadfield. The foundation stone was laid on 28 June 1838, the Coronation Day of Queen Victoria. The buildings were opened on 10 July 1845. Cost of construction exceeded £8,500. The facilities included a lock-up with four cells heated by hot water.

=== Dinting Viaduct ===
Dinting Viaduct was built in 1845, and later reinforced with additional piers. An accident occurred in 1855, when an MS&LR passenger train was stopped by signalling on the viaduct at night. Two men and a woman mistook the parapet of the viaduct for the station platform at Hadfield, alighted from the train and fell 75 feet to their deaths.

=== Coronation Bridge ===
Coronation Bridge (sometimes known as Webster Bridge) crosses Glossop Brook at a spot many locals call the 'Sandhole'. The current reinforced concrete bridge of c. 1928 replaced the 1902 original, of which it was reported in the Glossop-dale Chronicle and North Derbyshire Reporter of 25 April 1902 that "the new George Street Coronation Bridge has now arrived at Glossop, and a portion of it had a sort of triumphal procession through the town yesterday (Thursday) morning." It is a popular spot for local amateur photographers and was earmarked for improved access under Glossop's Active Travel Masterplan in 2024.

=== Parish Church of All Saints ===
The present-day (2008) fabric of the parish church of All Saints is mostly of the 20th century; very little remains of the previous churches on this site. The first mention of a church in Glossop is in the charter of 1157 conferring the manor of Glossop on Basingwerk Abbey. Although the dedication of the church to All Saints may indicate an Anglo-Saxon origin, no trace of such a church has been found. The first recorded vicar is William, of 1252. At this time the church was probably aisleless. It was altered in the 15th century when the nave was rebuilt with arcades, aisles and a still-extant (2008) arch at the east end of the north aisle. In 1554 a new and taller tower with a broach spire was built 3 feet west of the old tower, incorporating the east wall of the previous tower. The nave was completely rebuilt in 1831, with removal and replacement of much of the old fabric including the tracery of the aisle windows. The work was carried out by the firm of E. W. Drury of Sheffield, the cost far exceeding the initial estimate of £700. When the nave was rebuilt in 1914 it was discovered that the arch leading to the chancel had been partly made up of plaster, the wall supported by this arch had not been bonded into the existing chancel walls, and the "oak" roof bosses were also plaster. Between the pillars of the nave sleeper walls had been built to a higher level than the pillar bases. These walls appear to have been needed to counteract the effects on the church structure of a combination of excess drainage from the nearby hillside and the numerous burials inside the church. The pillars of the new nave of 1914 were superimposed on the bases of the old pillars, and the floor built up to cover the sleeper walls.

The tower and chancel were demolished and rebuilt in 1853–55, the new tower also having a broach spire. The chancel was again rebuilt in 1923, completing the architect C. M. Hadfield's plan of 1914. The present church has a nave of five bays, 25 yards long by 16 yards wide, with north and south aisles, and a chancel of 14 yards by 7 yards with a north aisle dedicated as St Catherine's Chapel.

=== Open spaces ===
Two public open spaces in Glossop have been given the Green Flag Award: Manor Park, close to the town centre, which has views of the surrounding countryside, and Howard Park, which was described by the Award organisation as "a good example of visionary layout from the Victorian era retaining many original features". Glossop's parkrun takes place in Manor Park every Saturday at 9am. Harehills Park, with its riverside footpath and mature trees, has been identified by Glossop Vision as a strategic open space, and was donated by the 2nd Lord Howard of Glossop as a First World War memorial.

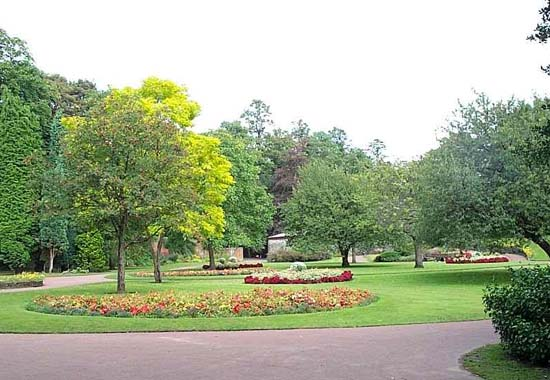
Manor Park's rose garden

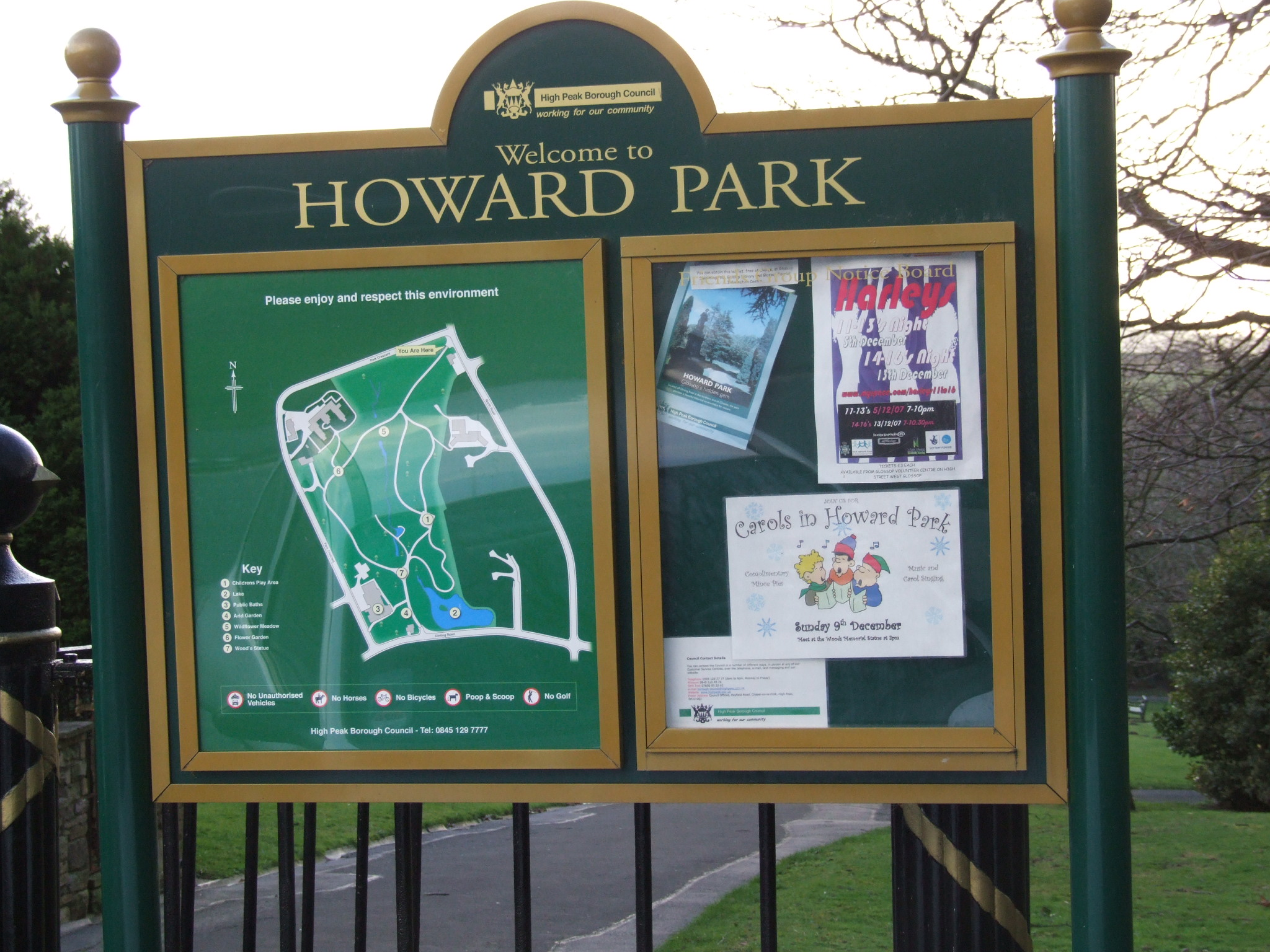
Notice board at the North Road entrance to Howard Park

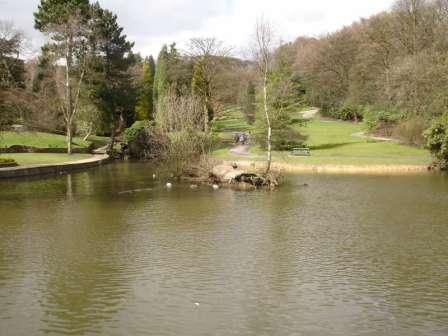
Howard Park duck pond in winter

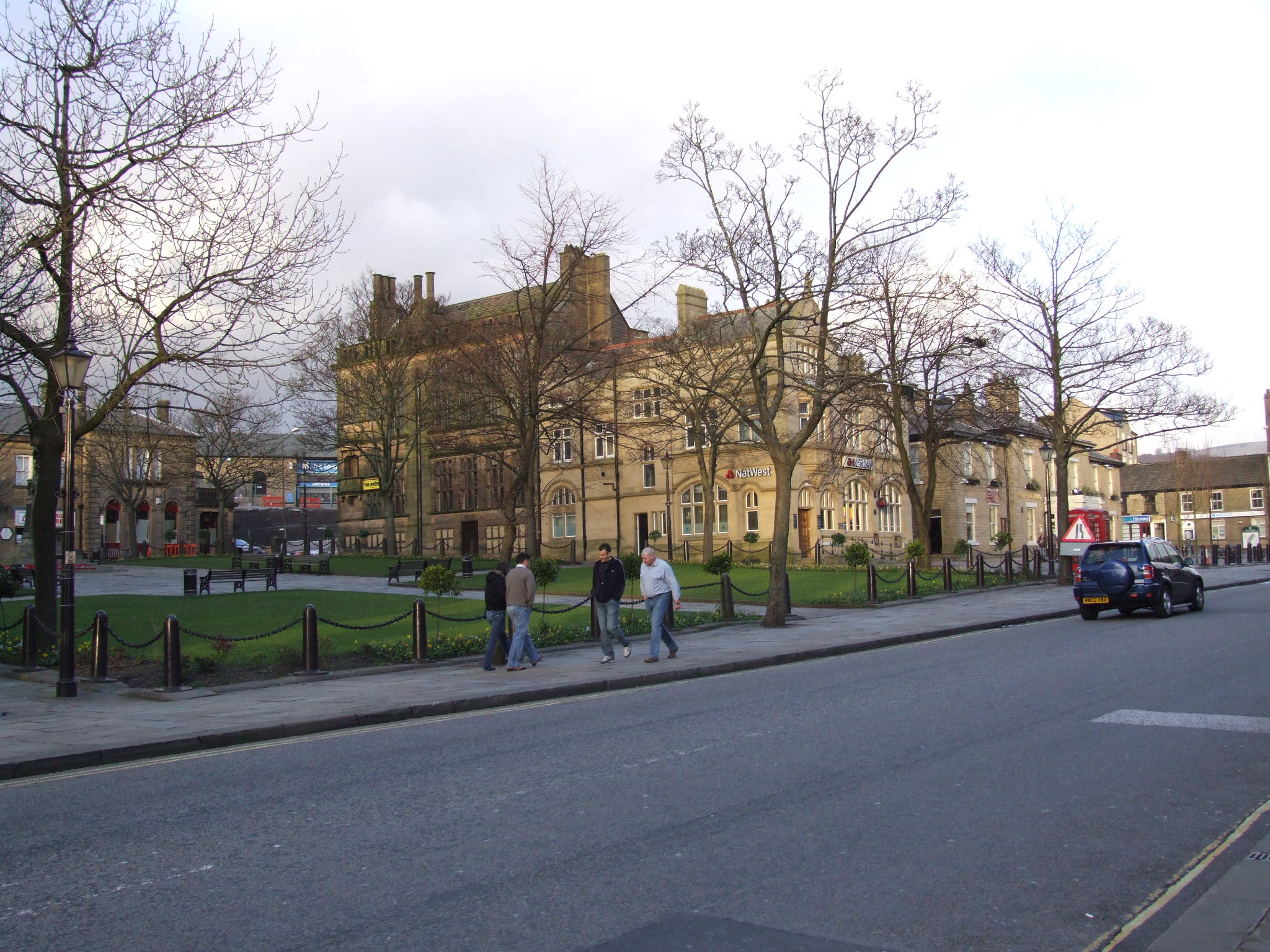
Norfolk Square, opposite the Town Hall

== Transport ==
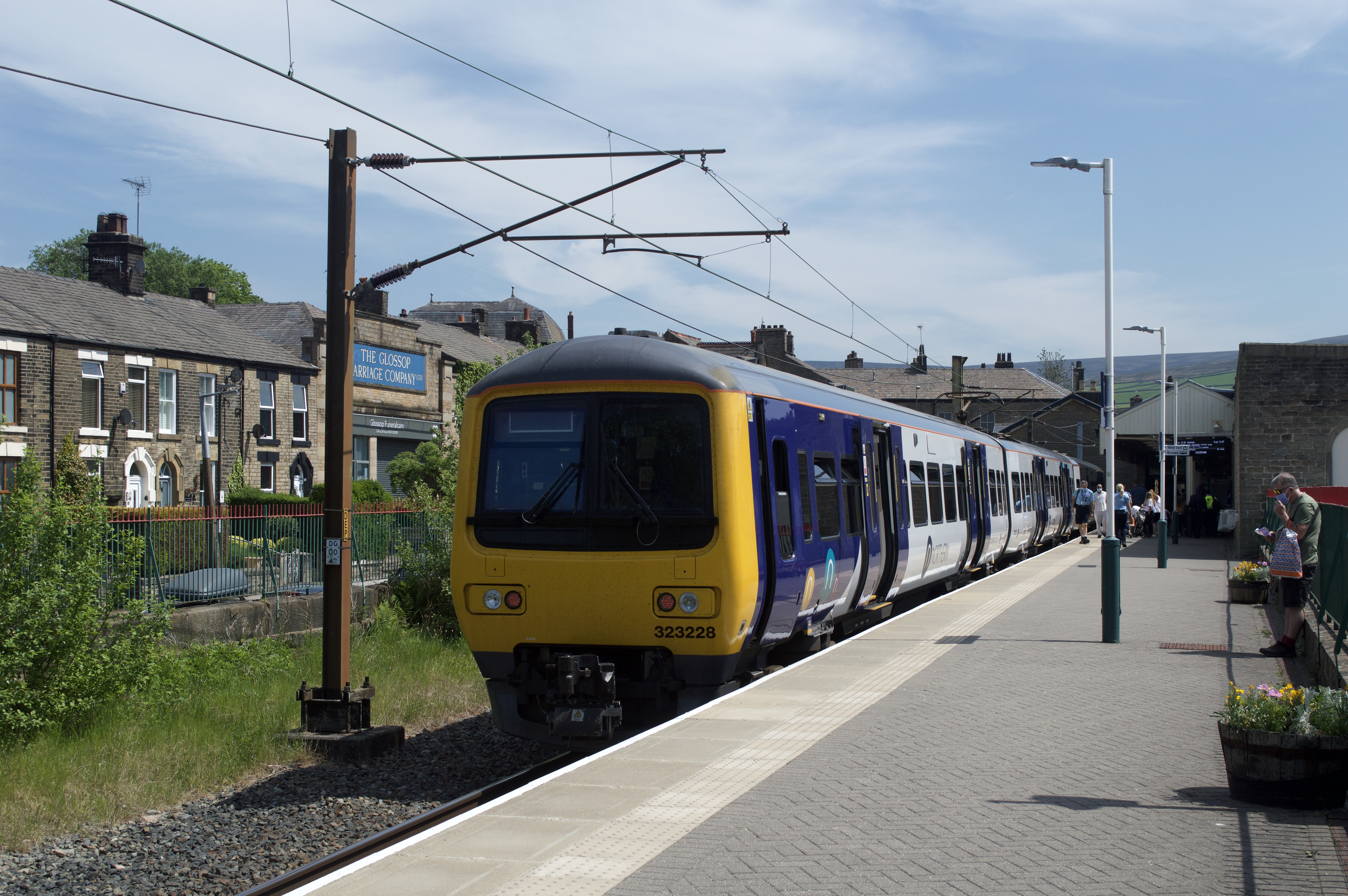
Northern Class 323 at Glossop station

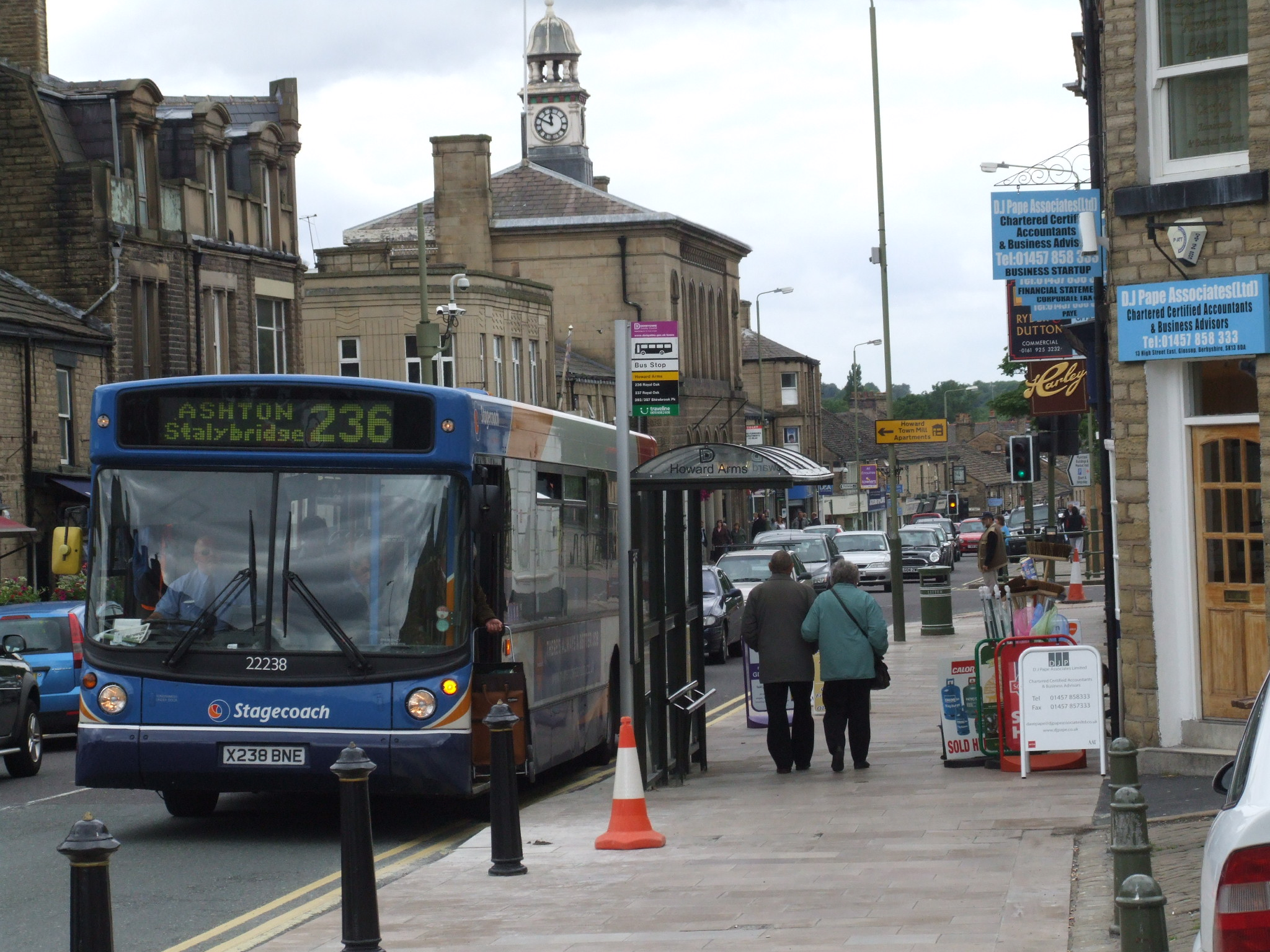
Stagecoach bus in High Street East

Early private horse-drawn buses were first provided by the Glossop Carriage Company Ltd, and an electric tramway connected Glossop with Hadfield between 1903 and 1927. Public transport in Glossop is now coordinated by Derbyshire County Council, with the exception of rail travel and some bus services being provided by Transport for Greater Manchester (TfGM).

=== Railway ===
Glossop railway station is on the Glossop line between Manchester Piccadilly and Hadfield. There are generally half-hourly train services, increasing to every 20 minutes during rush hour, along this remaining stub of the former Woodhead Line.

A user group, the Friends of Glossop Station, are working to make the station more attractive and to encourage greater use of public transport. The trains operated on the line are three-car Class 323 electric multiple units, built between 1992 and 1996 by Hunslet Transportation Projects.

=== Buses ===
There are regular bus services running to towns in Tameside, Buxton, New Mills, Whaley Bridge, the Hope Valley, Sheffield and infrequent services to Holmfirth.

Bus services in Glossop are operated predominantly by High Peak and Metroline Manchester (under the Bee Network) with services to Hyde operated by Go North West (Bee Network).

=== Roads ===
The main road through Glossop is the A57. To the west, this road (with the parallel M67 motorway) leads to Manchester, while Sheffield and the Hope Valley lie to the east, via the Snake Pass. The B6105 leads north then east, along the Woodhead Pass (A628) and eventually to the South Yorkshire town of Barnsley and the M1 motorway. Chapel-en-le-Frith, Buxton and Derby lie to the south, along the A624 and A6.

=== Leisure ===
The Peak District Boundary Walk runs along the eastern side of town through Charlestown and Old Glossop and the Pennine Bridleway passes the western side of town around Gamesley and Hadfield.

== Schools and further education ==
Primary schools:

- All Saints' RC Primary School
- Charlesworth C of E School
- Dinting C of E Primary School
- Duke of Norfolk's C of E Primary School
- Gamesley Community Primary School
- Hadfield Infant School
- Hadfield Nursery School
- Padfield County Primary School
- Simmondley Primary School
- St Andrew's C of E Junior School
- St Charles' RC Primary School
- St James's C of E Primary School (formerly Whitfield Primary School)
- St Luke's C of E Primary School
- St Margaret's RC Primary School
- St Mary's RC Primary School

Secondary schools:

- St Philip Howard Catholic Voluntary Academy
- Glossopdale School

Adult learning:

- Glossopdale Adult Community Education
- Glossopdale Sixth Form

Libraries:

- Glossop Library (Victoria Hall, Talbot Street, Glossop)
- Hadfield Library (Station Rd, Hadfield)
- Eric Read Community Library (Gamesley Primary School, Grindleford Grove, Gamesley)

== Sport ==
Glossop is the smallest town in England to have had a team in the top tier of the English football league system. Glossop North End were members of the Football League between 1898 and 1915; for the 1899–1900 season, they played in Division One. The team now plays in the North West Counties Football League Premier Division.

The town also has a number of sports clubs, including tennis, golf, rugby union, cricket, bowls, running, cycling and sailing at Torside Reservoir.

== Culture ==
=== Performing arts ===
Partington Theatre is an amateur theatre with a 120-seat venue in the centre of the town. It runs six plays each season and was established in 1954. The building was started in 1914 and completed in 1917.

Glossop Improv is an improvisation group for adults, running drop-in workshops online and in-person.

Glossop & District Choral Society is a community choir founded in 1949 by Margaret Lomas.

Glossop Operatic and Dramatic Society was an amateur musical/drama society established in 1976.

=== Community events ===
Glossop Victorian Weekend was the biggest weekend event in Glossop and was featured on the BBC's Songs of Praise. The weekend included many activities, including a Grand Victorian Costume Competition and a Shop Window Competition. The Victorian Weekend was discontinued in 2009 due to lack of local support. Running parallel with the Victorian Weekend was Glossop Beer Festival, run by the Campaign for Real Ale (CAMRA) and featuring over 30 beers and a barbecue in Glossop's Labour Club.

Glossop has a range of other cultural activities including Peak Film Society, a film club. Many other activities, including Glossop Folk Club take place at Glossop Labour Club. Also at Glossop Labour Club is the monthly Glossop Record Club, which holds vinyl listening sessions on the second Thursday of each month.

Glossop has an indoor and outdoor market where a wide selection of goods can be purchased. The indoor market is open every Thursday, Friday and Saturday, while the outdoor market is open every Friday and Saturday. The Outdoor Market is joined by the Local Produce Market on the second Saturday of every month throughout the year.

The Crown Inn public house at 142 Victoria Street, built in the 1840s, is on the Campaign for Real Ale's National Inventory of Historic Pub Interiors.

== Emergency service provision ==
Calls for service in the rural areas usually increase during the summer as the population is boosted by approximately twenty million visitors each year to the Peak District and its surrounds. Winter weather on the high ground around Glossop and Kinder Scout can also cause problems for traffic and residents.

=== Hospitals ===
State healthcare is provided for in Glossop and District by the NHS Derby and Derbyshire Integrated Care Board. Despite this, patients from the area use Tameside General Hospital located in Ashton-under-Lyne, Greater Manchester, because there are no district general hospitals (hospitals with an Accident and Emergency Department) within the borough of High Peak. The nearest hospital with A&E facilities within the county is in Chesterfield, some 30 miles (50 kilometres) from the town by road.

=== Ambulance and paramedics ===
The North West Ambulance Service (NWAS) is the main ambulance service provider for the area, with an ambulance station on Chapel Street. However, services are occasionally complemented and assisted by the East Midlands Ambulance Service (EMAS) in times of high demand, or to assist with a major incident.

=== Police and crime ===
When Glossop was granted Municipal Borough Status in 1867, the Watch Committee elected to implement its own police force. Glossop Police remained independent until 1947 when they amalgamated with the Derbyshire Constabulary. The police station on Ellison Street is staffed by statutory police officers from B Division of Derbyshire Constabulary. It has a custody suite, five cells and an incident room. There are also a team of volunteer special constables and six police community support officers.

=== Fire service ===
General fire and rescue cover is provided by the Derbyshire Fire and Rescue Service. Glossop fire station is based in the Charlestown area, just off the A624 road.

=== Mountain rescue ===
Specialised search and rescue services are provided by the volunteer Glossop Mountain Rescue Team, part of the Peak District Mountain Rescue Organisation. Their remit is to 'save lives in the mountains and moorlands'.

== Twin town ==
Glossop is twinned with Bad Vilbel, a spa town in the Wetteraukreis district of Hesse, Germany, 5 miles (8 km) north-east of Frankfurt.

In 1985 the Glossop–Bad Vilbel Twinning Association was established. Its aims are:

To promote and foster friendship and understanding between the people of Glossop and district and those of Bad Vilbel and district in Germany. To encourage visits by individuals and groups to and from the linked towns, particularly by children and young people, and the development of personal contacts, and by doing so to broaden the mutual understanding of the cultural, recreational, educational and commercial activities of the linked towns.
Source: The Glossop-Bad Vilbel Twinning Association

In 1987 formal twinning ceremonies were held in both towns, with a tree being planted in Norfolk Square. The Twinning Association arranges for visitors to stay with families. The two signatories of the charter were Catherine Holtom, the Mayor of High Peak, and Gunther Biwer, Bürgermeister of Bad Vilbel.

== Literature and the media ==
Hilaire Belloc wrote about Glossop in a letter to a Miss Hamilton in 1909: "Do you know the filthy village of Glossop? It is inhabited entirely by savages. I tried every inn in the place and found each inn worse than the last. It stinks for miles. Rather than sleep in such a den I started walking back to Manchester with a huge bag...."

Glossop is mentioned in the satirical book England, Their England by A. G. Macdonell. The town's fictional newspaper, the Glossop Evening Mail, is described as the lowest rung in the journalistic profession.

In 2013, Old Glossop was used for filming in the BBC drama series The Village, starring John Simm and Maxine Peake. The Parish Church of All Saints and the former Duke of Norfolk school building appeared in the series.

Local newspapers includes the Glossop Advertiser newspaper owned by the Manchester Evening News, the Glossop Chronicle, the Buxton Advertiser, the Glossop Gazette,

Regional TV news comes from Salford-based BBC North West and ITV Granada. Television signals are received from Winter Hill and the local relay transmitters.

The town's local radio stations are BBC Radio Manchester, Glossop Community Radio and Greatest Hits Radio Derbyshire (High Peak), formerly known as High Peak Radio.

== Notable persons ==
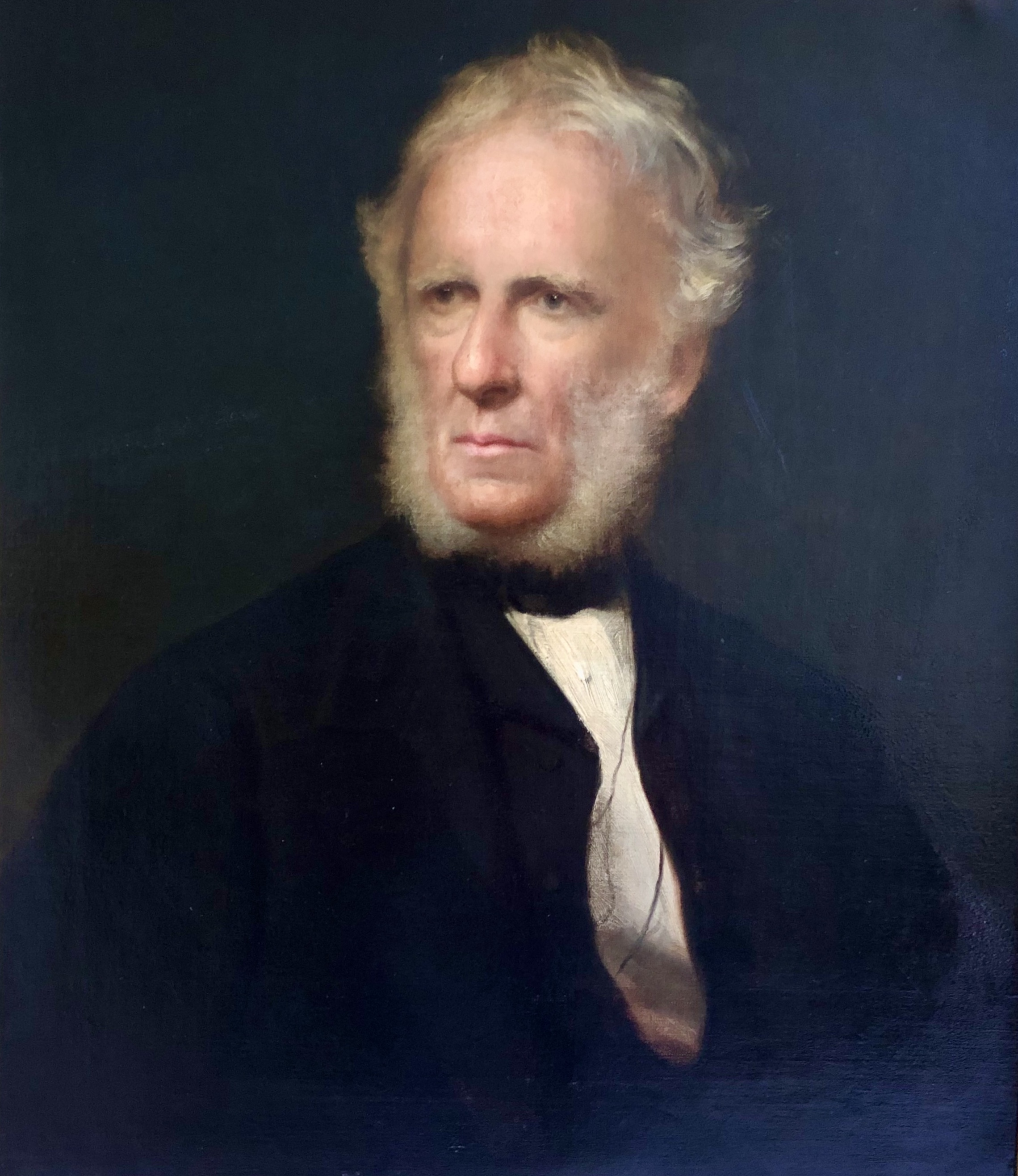
Edmund Potter, before 1883

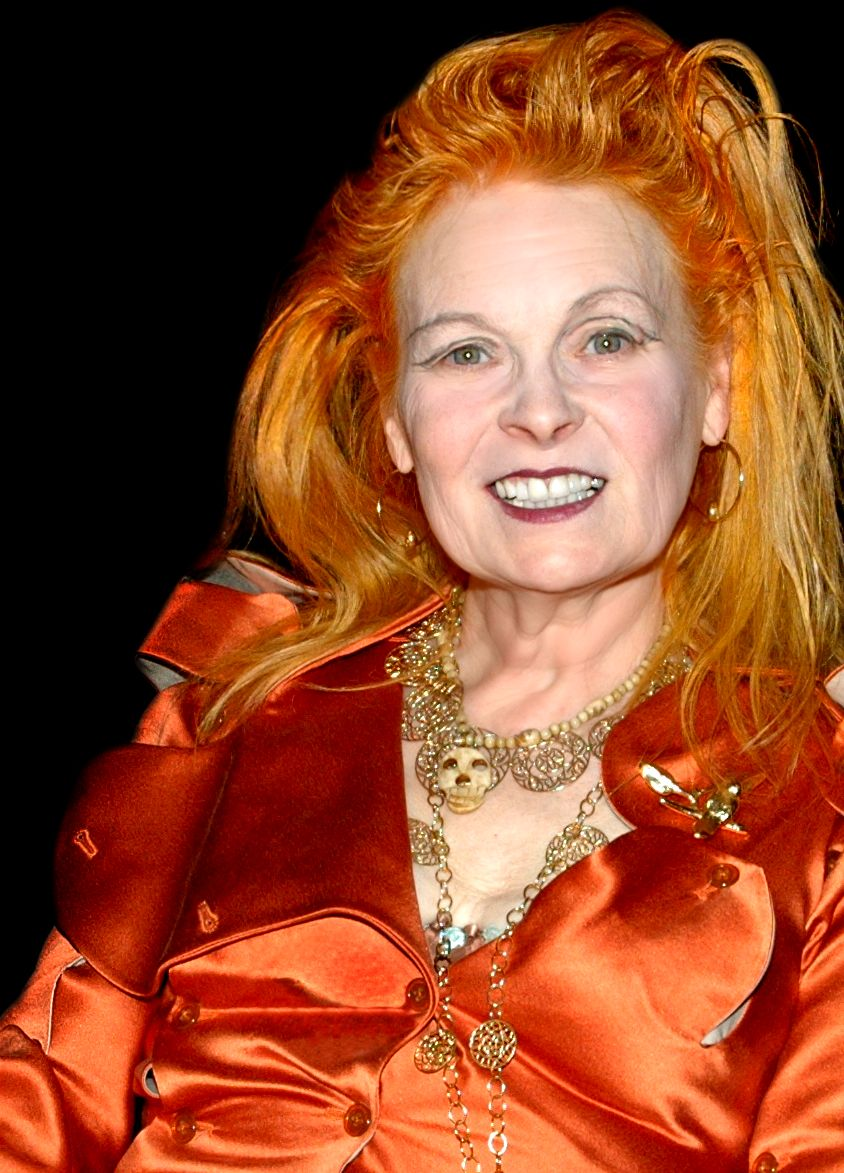
Vivienne Westwood, 2008

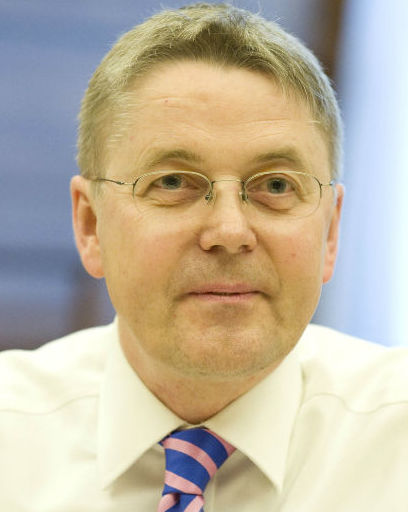
Jeremy Heywood, 2015

- Nicholas Garlick (c. 1555 – 1588), English priest, martyred in the reign of Queen Elizabeth I.
- Charles Calvert (1785–1852), a British landscape painter.
- Frederick Baltimore Calvert (1793–1877), an English actor and academic.
- Michael Pease Calvert (1798-1875) a British landscape painter.
- Edmund Potter (1802–1883), businessman, industrialist, politician and MP, he moved his business to Glossop in 1825
- Francis Sumner (1807–1884), built a large business. mill owner and became the first Mayor of Glossop
- Matthew Ellison Hadfield (1812–1885), Gothic Revival architect, born at Lees Hall.
- Charles Hadfield (1821–1884), journalist, edited the Manchester City News from 1865 to 1867.
- Edward Partington, 1st Baron Doverdale (1836–1925), industrialist from Bury, arrived locally in 1874
- Benjamin Charles Garside (1863–1933), expatriate to Wisconsin, machinist and Populist legislator.
- Sir Samuel Hill-Wood (1872–1949), businessman, politician, cricketer and football club chairman.
- Ludwig Wittgenstein (1889 – 1951), Austrian philosopher, stayed at the Grouse Inn in Glossop in 1908 while studying and working at Manchester University.
- Harold Fletcher (1907–1978), botanist and horticulturist and Her Majesty's Botanist from 1966 to 1978.
- Sir Norman Skelhorn (1909–1988), barrister who was Director of Public Prosecutions for England and Wales from 1964 to 1977.
- Paul Raymond, (1925–2008), strip-club owner, publisher of pornography and property developer, moved to Glossop where he was educated by the Irish Christian Brothers.
- Frederick Rowbottom (1938–2009), British logician and mathematician. The set theory, Rowbottom cardinal is named after him.
- John Vernon Lord (born 1939), illustrator and author of children's books, such as The Giant Jam Sandwich, and Professor of Illustration at the University of Brighton relatives owned local cafe.
- Dame Vivienne Westwood (1941–2022), fashion designer, brought modern punk and new wave fashion into the mainstream
- Hilary Mantel (1952–2022), British novelist, short story writer and critic.
- Eileen Cooper (born 1953), English contemporary painter and printmaker best known for her stylised paintings of women or couples,
- Andy Wilman (born 1962), co-creator and producer, BBC Top Gear, born in Glossop.
- Jeremy Heywood, Baron Heywood of Whitehall (1961–2018), Cabinet Secretary, from 2012 to 2018 and Head of the Home Civil Service from 2014 to 2018; lived on Spire Hollin.
- Libby Lane (born 1966), brought up locally, the first Anglican bishop
- Maiya Quansah-Breed (born 1997), English singer and stage actress, brought up locally.

=== Sport ===
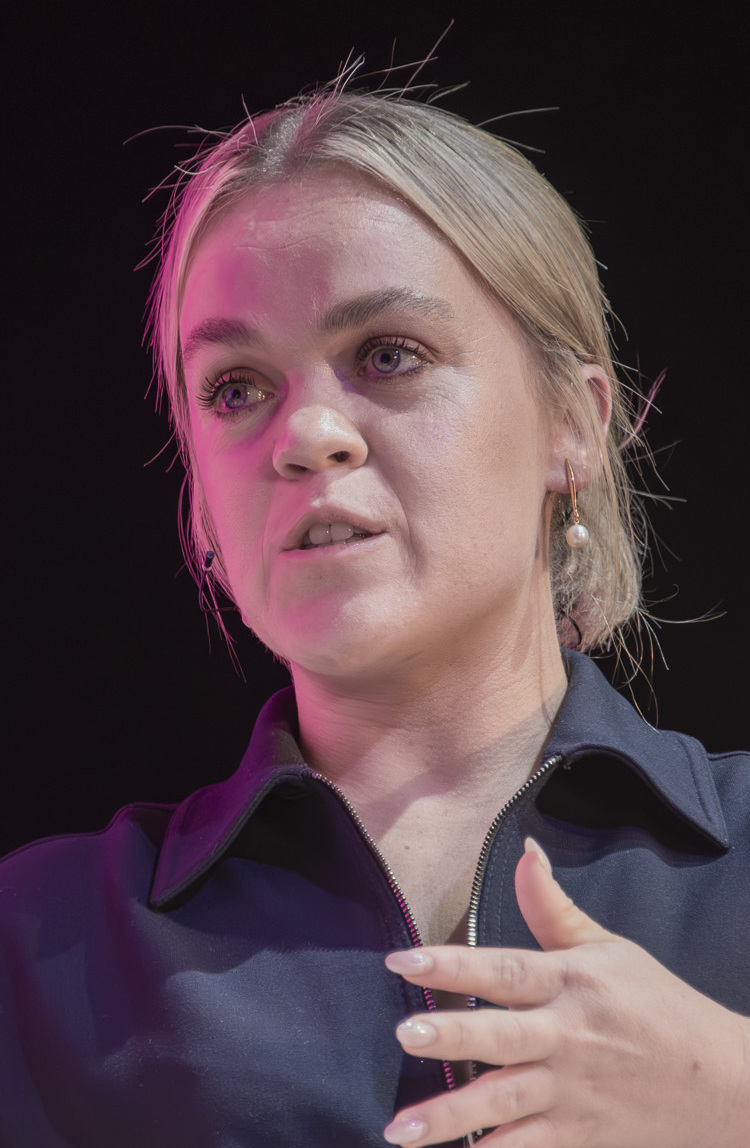
Ellie Simmonds, 2025

- Thomas Foster (1848–1929), cricketer who played 90 matches for Derbyshire
- Joseph Bowden (1884–1958), cricketer who played 231 first-class cricket games for Derbyshire
- Leonard Oliver (1886–1948), cricketer who played 174 first-class cricket games for Derbyshire
- Frederick Bracey (1887–1960), cricketer who played 77 first-class cricket games for Derbyshire
- Terry Fogerty (1944–2013), rugby league footballer who played 298 games with Halifax Panthers
- Dan Money (born 1976), bobsleigher who represented GB at the Vancouver 2010 Winter Olympics.
- Keith Briggs (born 1981), football coach and former player, he played over 300 games
- James Vincent (born 1989), footballer and coach who played 374 games
- Ellie Simmonds (born 1994), retired Paralympian swimmer who won two gold medals at the 2008 Summer Paralympics
- Andy Cannon (born 1996), footballer played 250 games, lived in Simmondley and attended St Philip Howard Catholic Voluntary Academy.
- Alisha Palmowski (born 2006), English racing driver, runner up in the 2024 GB4 Championship

== See also ==
- Listed buildings in Glossop
