= St Philip Howard Catholic Voluntary Academy =

Location
- Sunlaws Street; Glossop; Derbyshire, SK13 8DR; England; 53°26′32″N 1°57′24″W

Information
- Type: Academy
- Motto: ‘The more suffering for Christ in this world, more Glory with Christ in the next' – Philip Howard, 20th Earl of Arundel, 22 June 1587
- Religious affiliation: Roman Catholic
- Established: September 1961 as 'Blessed Philip Howard'
- Local authority: Derbyshire
- Trust: St Ralph Sherwin Catholic Multi-academy trust UID 4442
- Department for Education URN: 142042 Tables
- Ofsted: Reports
- Headteacher: Louisa Morris
- Staff: 35
- Gender: Mixed
- Age: 11 to 16
- Enrolment: 474
- Capacity: 520
- Houses: Challenge, Courage, Determination, Endeavour
- Colours: Maroon and gold
- Website: www.sph.academy

St Philip Howard Catholic Voluntary Academy (formerly St Philip Howard Catholic School) is a Roman Catholic secondary school located in Glossop in northern Derbyshire.

== Description ==
St Philip Howard Catholic Voluntary Academy is a small co-educational, three form entry, 11–16 Catholic comprehensive school that has traditionally provided secondary education for Catholic school children in the Glossopdale and Longdendale valleys. The school attracts applications from a wide variety of backgrounds and other primary schools in Glossop. The current headteacher is Louisa Morris. The school attends a religious service at the nearby St Mary's Catholic Church at least once a term. The school welcomes applications from all students, but makes clear that Catholic children come first in the selection process. Students come from Catholic primary schools around Glossop, Gamesley, Hadfield and Old Glossop and some join the school from other non-religious schools in Glossop, Tintwistle and the Longdendale and Tameside areas.

- All Saints Catholic Primary School, Old Glossop
- St Margarets Catholic Primary School, Glossop
- St Mary's Catholic Primary School, Glossop
- St Charles Catholic Primary School, Hadfield

== Governance ==
Previously it was a voluntary aided school administered by Derbyshire County Council. St Philip Howard Catholic School converted to academy status in September 2015 and was renamed St Philip Howard Catholic Voluntary Academy. It joined the St Ralph Sherwin Catholic Multi Academy Trust in 2018. The school retains a relationship with the Roman Catholic Diocese of Nottingham.

== Curriculum ==
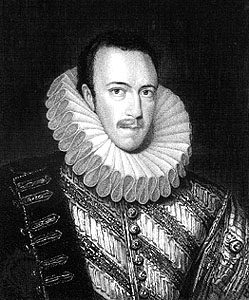
St Philip Howard, after whom the school is named

Students enter the school in Year 7 with a wide variety of traditional subjects on offer. The emphasis is on English, Maths and Science. The school is a specialist sports college with English as the second specialist subject. The school offers three separate sciences at GCSE for those deemed capable.

=== Key Stage 3 ===
At Key Stage 3, the school aims to deliver broad and balanced curriculum, developing a "thirst for learning" in the students. They need this prior learning and new skills and knowledge, so they can benefit from the more focused work in Key Stage 4. Over a two-week timetable totalling 50 hours, students will study English eight hours, Maths eight hours, History and Geography for three hours each, Science for six hours, Technology for two hours and a Modern Foreign Language for four hours. Religious Education gets five hours, PHSE gets one hour, Art, Computing, and Music get two hours. Physical Education has two, two-hour slots.

In year 9, students start to specialise, they take three subjects alongside the core subjects of English, Maths, Science and RE. This personalised curriculum allows students to study at greater depth developing a deeper knowledge and understanding of the chosen subjects, and have support in choosing the correct pathway for their future careers.

=== Key Stage 4 ===
Students continue to study their three subjects whilst continuing with English, Maths and Science, Religious Education and Physical Education. All of the traditional subjects are on offer. Students can choose to do Physical Education at GCSE and will therefore increase their time in this subject. The school has introduced a broad range of vocational qualifications which allows students to attend a separate college one day a week to study extra courses.

== Buildings ==
The school has two main areas, known as "The Main Building" and "Campion House". The latter was named after the Catholic martyr Edmund Campion (1540–1581), who was executed in the reign of Elizabeth I. Three new classrooms have recently been built, added to the lower part of Campion House.

== Results ==
GCSE Results August 2011 73% achieved five or more A* to C Results including Maths and English. 88% achieved five or more A* to C's. The results are above average compared to similar schools nationally, and have improved year on year. However based on the new English Baccalaureate introduced by the Conservative Education Secretary Michael Gove in 2011, only 13% of students achieved five A* to C grades.
