= St Luke's Church, Glossop =

St. Luke's Church Glossop
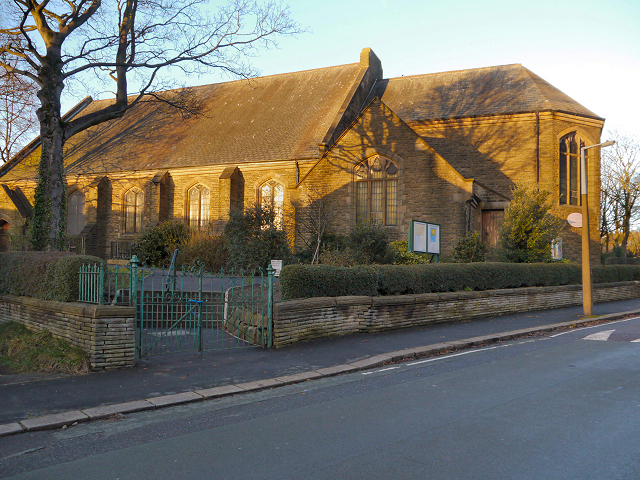
- St Luke's Church Glossop
- St. Luke's Church Glossop
- 53°26′46.9″N 1°57′4.2″W
- OS grid reference: SK 03340 94398
- Location: Glossop, Derbyshire
- Country: England
- Denomination: Church of England
- Churchmanship: Evangelical

History
- Dedication: St Luke
- Consecrated: 18 October 1906

Architecture
- Construction cost: £4,000 (equivalent to £420,000 in 2025).

Administration
- Province: Canterbury
- Diocese: Derby
- Archdeaconry: Derby
- Deanery: Glossop
- Parish: Glossop

St. Luke's Church, Glossop is an Anglican church in Glossop, Derbyshire, England.

== History ==
The current building was dedicated on St. Luke's day (18 October) 1906 by the Bishop of Derby. It was built at a cost of £4,000 and was the gift of Mrs. S. Wood of Moorfield.

== Parish ==
Along with St James' Church Glossop, it makes up Whitfield Parish Glossop within the Diocese of Derby. and is in the evangelical tradition. The church is situated on Fauvel Road, just a few minutes walk from Glossop town centre.

The minister-in-charge of St. Luke's from January 2004 to January 2010 was the Rev'd Dr Terry Clark. From September 2010 the Associate Minister with responsibility for the St. Luke's Congregation is the Rev'd Brian Magorrian.
