= Shire Hill Hospital =

- Tameside and Glossop Integrated Care NHS Foundation Trust
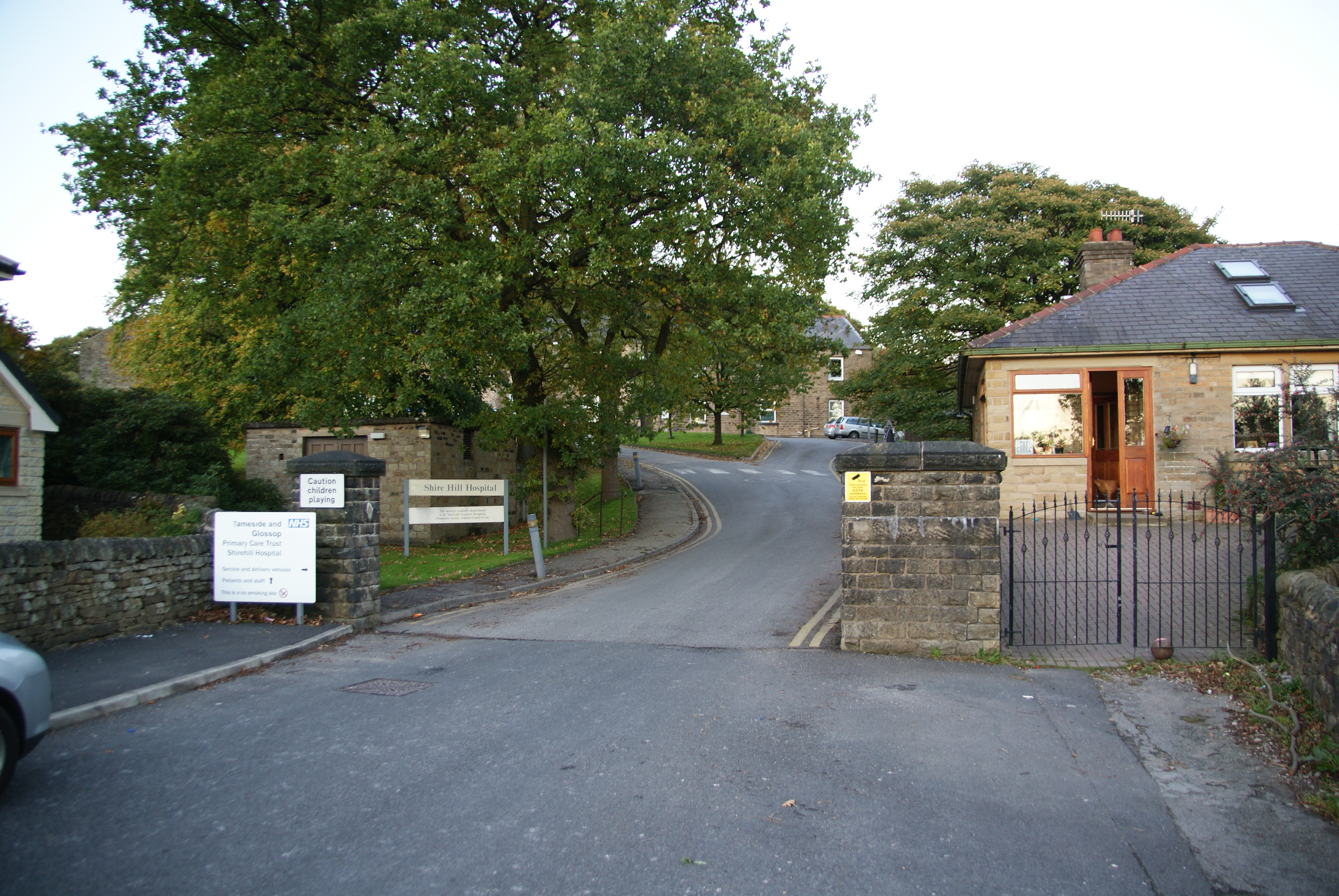
- Shire Hill Hospital

- Location in the Borough of High Peak

Geography
- Location: Bute Street, Glossop, Derbyshire, England
- Coordinates: 53.4537°N 1.9383°W

Organisation
- Care system: NHS
- Type: Community

History
- Founded: 1837
- Closed: 2018

Links
- Website: https://www.tamesidehospital.nhs.uk/

Shire Hill Hospital was a healthcare facility in Bute Street, Glossop, Derbyshire, England. It was managed by Tameside and Glossop Integrated Care NHS Foundation Trust.

== History ==
The facility was opened as the Glossop Union Workhouse in 1837. An infirmary building was subsequently added and extended in 1927. During the First World War beds were set aside for British military casualties. It became the Glossop Public Assistance Institution in 1930 and joined the National Health Service as Shire Hill Hospital in 1948. The trust announced a consultation on the potential closure of the hospital in 2017. After services were transferred to Tameside General Hospital, Shire Hill Hospital closed in 2018.
