= St James' Church Glossop =

St James's Church Glossop
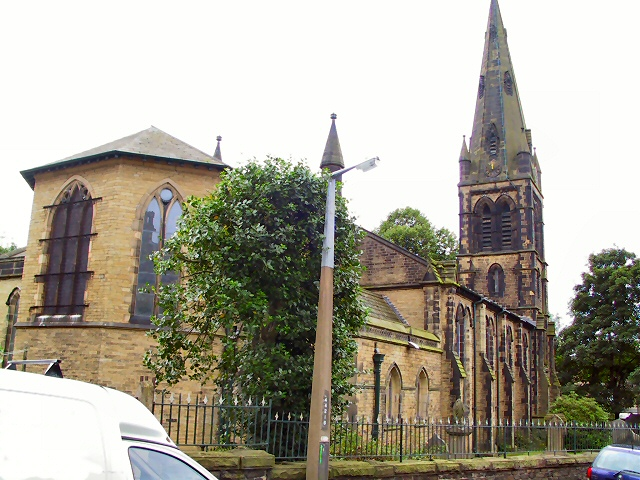
- St James's Church Glossop
- St James's Church Glossop
- 53°26′19.32″N 1°57′10.08″W
- Location: Glossop
- Country: England
- Denomination: Church of England
- Churchmanship: Evangelical

History
- Dedication: St. James
- Consecrated: 8 September 1846

Architecture
- Heritage designation: Grade II listed
- Designated: 22 May 2000
- Architect: Edwin Hugh Shellard
- Groundbreaking: 27 September 1844
- Completed: 1846

Administration
- Diocese: Diocese of Derby
- Archdeaconry: Chesterfield
- Deanery: Glossop
- Parish: Whitfield

St. James's Church is an Anglican church in the evangelical tradition in the town of Glossop, Derbyshire, in the north-west of England. Along with St. Luke's Church, it makes up Whitfield Parish within Derby Diocese.

The churchyard contains war graves of three soldiers of World War I, and a Grade II listed memorial to Samuel Wood, a local mill-owner.

== History ==
The foundation stone was laid on 27 September 1844 and construction started to the designs of the architect Edwin Hugh Shellard. The church was consecrated on 8 September 1846 by the Bishop of Lichfield. The chancel was enlarged in 1897 by Naylor and Sale, and a vestry added at the turn of the 20th century. In 2000, the church was designated a Grade II listed building.

== Organ ==
The church has a pipe organ by Forster and Andrews dating from 1859. A specification of the organ can be found on the National Pipe Organ Register.

== See also ==
- Listed buildings in Glossop
