= Glossop Castle =

Coordinates: 53.4563°N 1.9592°W

Glossop Castle (also known as Mouselow Castle) is a Norman earthwork north of Glossop, off Hilltop Road, 14 miles (23 km) east of Manchester, on the A57. The site is visible from the main road, standing atop a commanding ridge. Some 12 miles (19 km) southeast is Peveril Castle.

== History ==
The castle is a Norman earthwork motte-and-bailey fortress, founded by William Peverel. The Norman castle sits on an old Celtic hilltop site, possibly a hillfort. The earthworks have been damaged by quarrying and the position of the bailey has been lost. The site is a Scheduled Monument.
