= Little Hayfield =

Hamlet in Derbyshire, England

Coordinates: 53.398°N 1.955°W

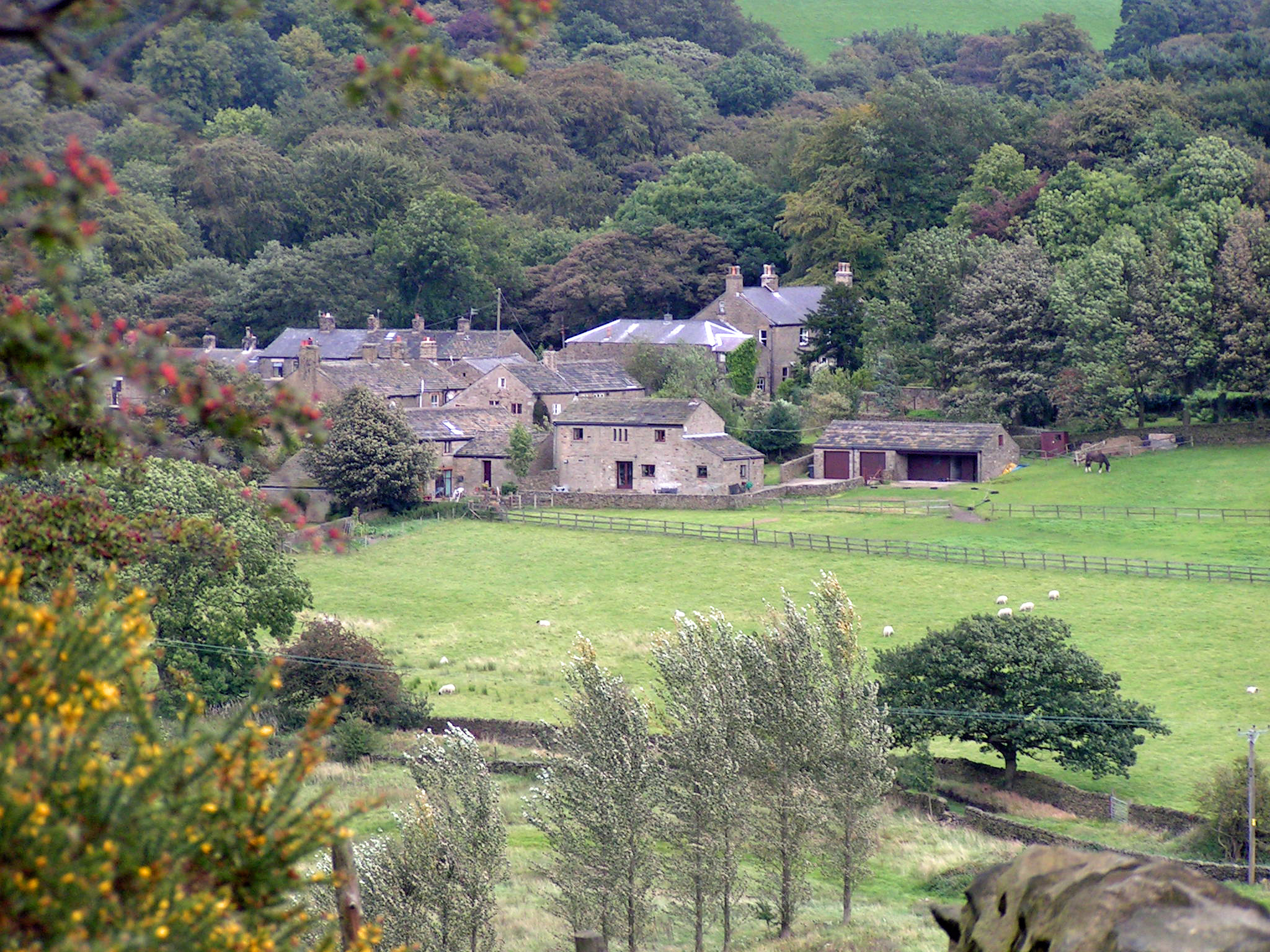
- Little Hayfield from the southwest

- Location within Derbyshire
- OS grid reference: SK030890
- District: High Peak
- Shire county: Derbyshire
- Region: East Midlands
- Country: England
- Sovereign state: United Kingdom
- Post town: HIGH PEAK
- Postcode district: SK22
- Dialling code: 01663
- Police: Derbyshire
- Fire: Derbyshire
- Ambulance: East Midlands
- UK Parliament: High Peak

Little Hayfield is a hamlet in the Peak District National Park, in Derbyshire, England. It lies on the A624 between Hayfield and Glossop. At the centre of the hamlet is the Lantern Pike pub, named after the nearby hill of the same name. Fell racing take place in Little Hayfield, and until 2021 an annual country show was held on a local farm, including sheepdog trials.

From Clough Mill, a former water-powered and later steam-powered textile mill converted to apartments in 1989, a footpath leads to the summit of Lantern Pike.

The screenwriter Tony Warren lived in the village, and is said to have conceived the soap opera Coronation Street in the Lantern Pike pub. Actors Pat Phoenix and Kenneth Cope had spells living in the village, as did producer Bill Podmore.

== Landmarks ==
Park Hall is a Grade II listed house nearby. Its semicircular stable block is listed at the higher grade, grade II*. The current house, on the site of an earlier building, was built in 1812, and the stables in 1820. Within the grounds of the hall was an outdoor swimming pool, built in 1934 and open to the public until 1970. Several local farmhouses and other farm buildings are also listed at Grade II.

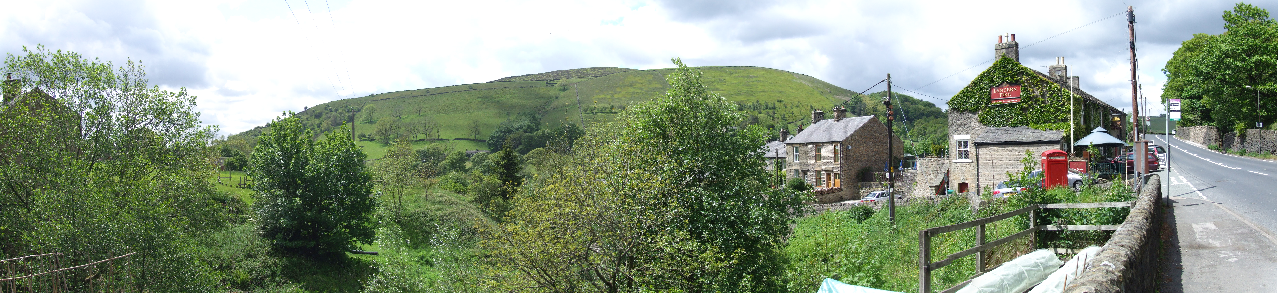
Lantern Pike
