= John Wood (millowner) =

British millowner

John Wood of Marsden came to Glossop from Manchester in 1819 and bought existing woollen mills which he expanded. These were the Howard Town mills. In 1825, John Wood installed the first steam engine and power looms. The Howardtown Mills became the largest spinning weaving combine in Glossop, and with Wren's Nest, and Waterside Mills, Hadfield dominated the Derbyshire cotton industry.
