= Glossop Town Hall =

Municipal building in Glossop, Derbyshire, England

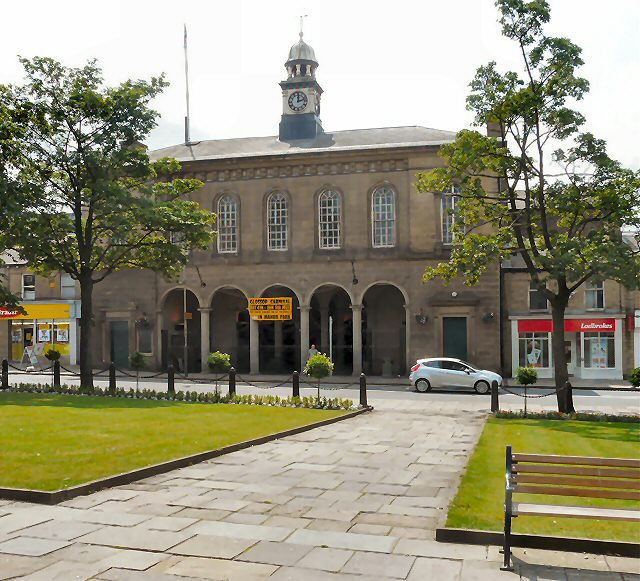
- Glossop Town Hall from Norfolk Square
- Interactive map of the Glossop Town Hall area

General information
- Classification

Listed Building – Grade II
- Designated: 4 December 1958
- Reference no.: 1384269
- Location: Glossop, England
- Coordinates: 53.443169°N 1.949726°W
- Completed: 1923
- Opened: 1838
- Cost: £8,500

Design and construction
- Architect: Matthew Ellison Hadfield

Glossop Town Hall, Market Hall, and Municipal Buildings is a complex in the centre of Glossop, Derbyshire, providing offices for High Peak Borough Council, a retail arcade, and covered market. The Town Hall was constructed in 1838 and significantly extended and altered in 1845, 1897 and 1923. The Town Hall building was designed by Weightman and Hadfield of Sheffield for the 12th Duke of Norfolk. It is constructed from millstone grit ashlar and topped with a distinctive circular cupola and clock. It is Grade II listed, forming a group with the market and Municipal Buildings to the south, and rows of shops to High Street West either side which were also part of Hadfield's design, and which marked the transition of Howard Town from a satellite industrial village to a freestanding urban entity.

It lies in the Norfolk Square Conservation Area which includes a number of other listed buildings around the square. The main elevation, intact with many surviving architectural details, forms an important part of the composition of the historic Norfolk Square. A blue plaque was erected by Glossop Heritage Trust in 2015 to commemorate its architect Matthew Ellison Hadfield and his contribution to the area.

== Description ==
The building is Italianate in style and designed in its original form as a T-plan. The north elevation fronts High Street West opposite Norfolk Square with the taller town hall block surrounded by four shops either side. One of the domed pavilions on the ends has now been demolished. The ground floor has vermiculated rustication and a central five-bay open arcade (leading to the market hall) with round arches and Tuscan Doric columns, flanked by single doorways with double doors and moulded ashlar surrounds and bracketed hoods. There is a square clock turret on the roof with a circular cupola.

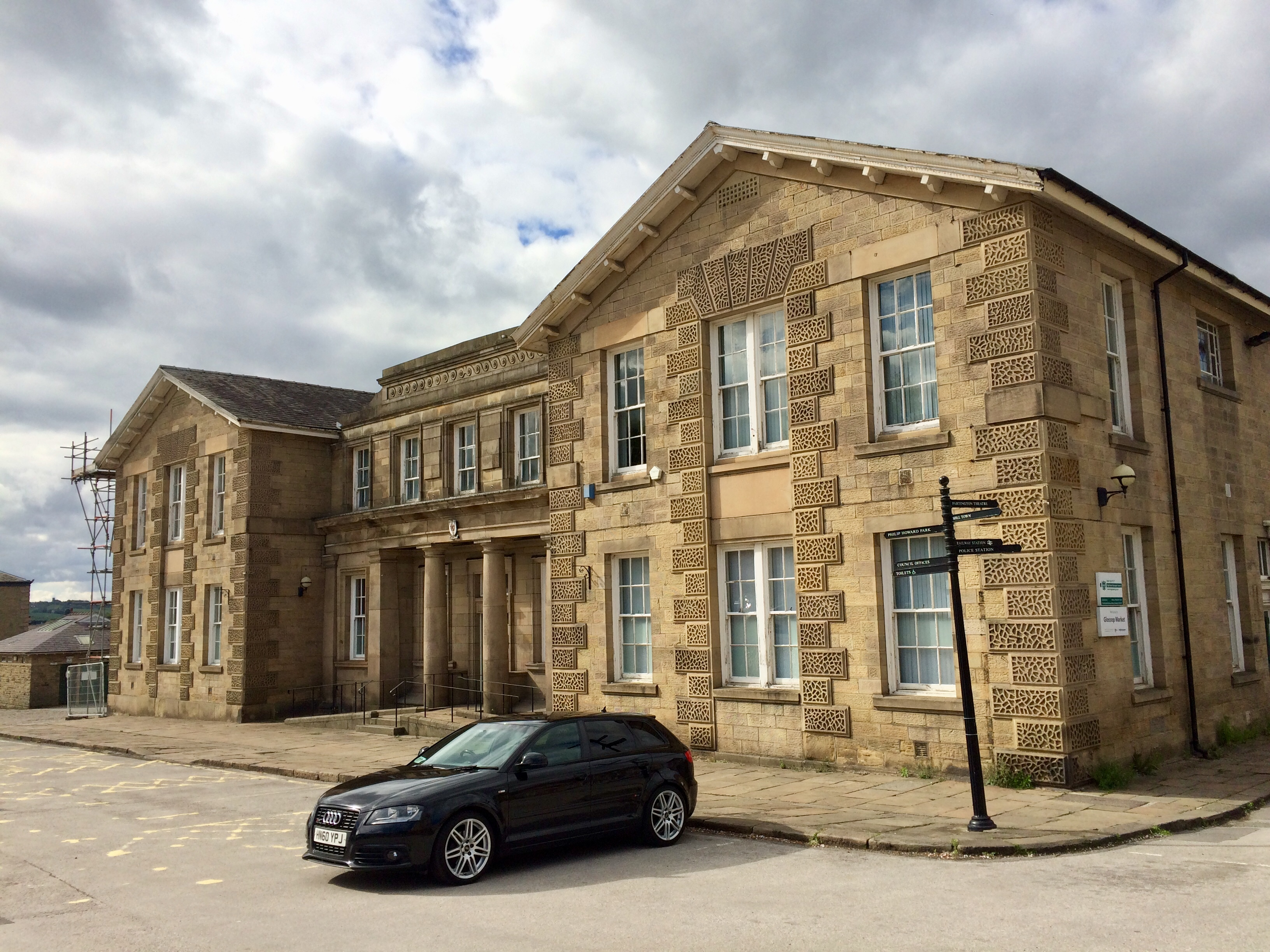
Glossop Municipal Buildings and council car park

Facing south, connected to the market hall and Town Hall, is the Municipal Buildings of 1923, which still serves as council offices, a function shared with Buxton Town Hall at the other end of the borough, and also as an information centre. This is in a different, more Classical, style with further use of Tuscan Doric columns, but also gables and vermiculated quoins, topped by a parapet with Vitruvian scroll motif. To the south of the Municipal Buildings and outdoor market, there is a large public car park surfaced with asphalt, beneath which runs the culverted Glossop Brook.

== History ==
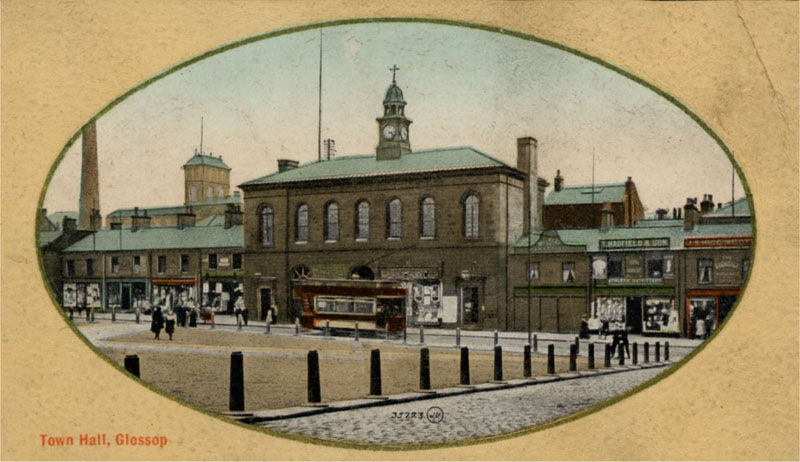
A postcard of Norfolk Square and Glossop Town Hall, c.1910

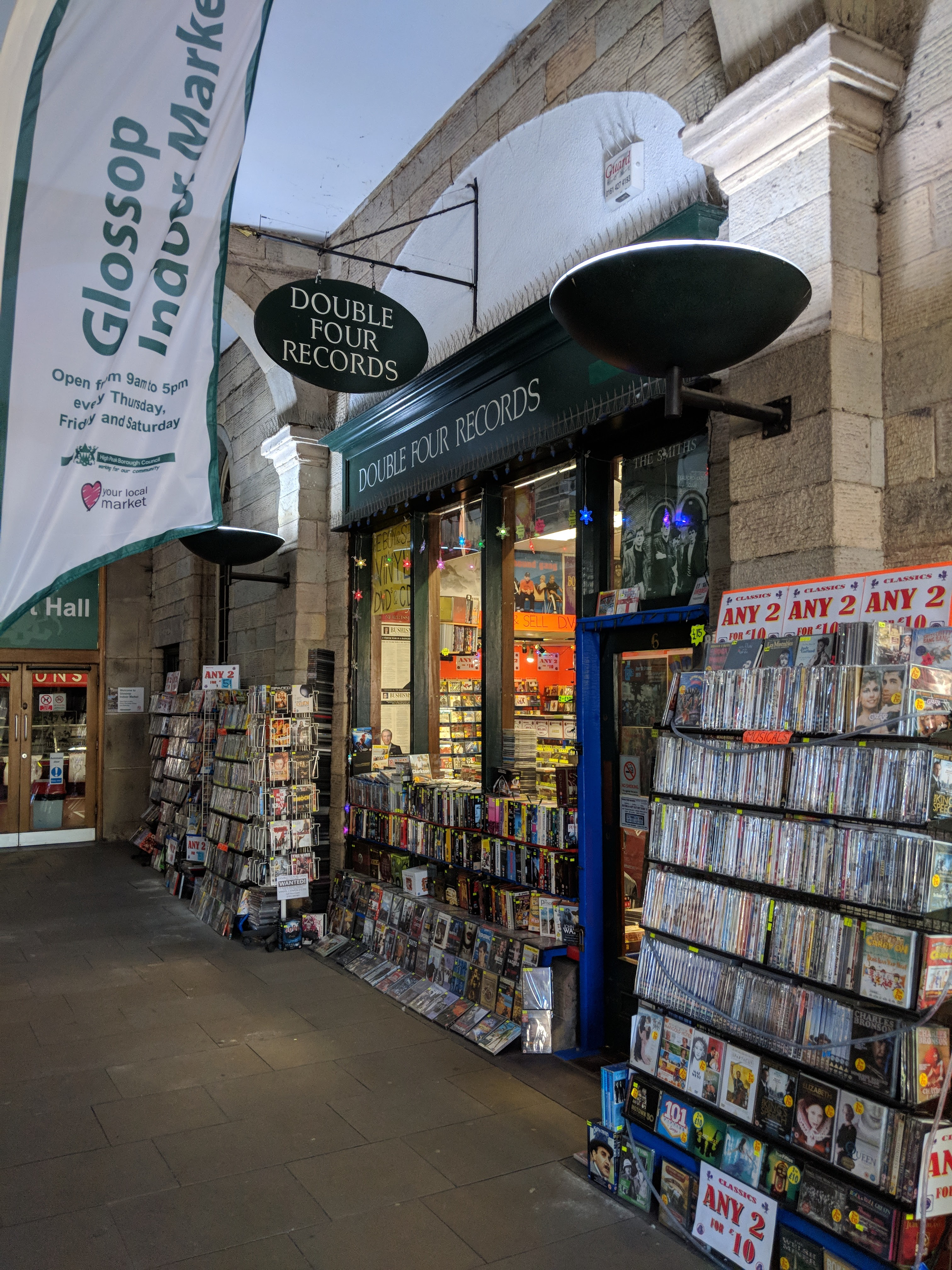
A shop inside the downstairs arcade

The town of Glossop began to develop on the junction of two roads in a fairly remote location as activity was stimulated in the 16th and 17th centuries by the expansion of the wool and cotton industries which expanded further in the 18th century by industrialisation. As the mill's trade grew, the population rose rapidly, as did demand for housing and services. The new community became known as Howardtown – named after the Lords of the Manor who were at that time the Howards, Dukes of Norfolk – and was the most populated and important township within Glossop. No elected administration existed and all communal facilities such as roads and public buildings were the responsibility of the landowner, the Duke. In 1838, Bernard Howard, 12th Duke of Norfolk, commissioned the building of the Town Hall to provide an administrative centre to the thriving township.

The foundation stone of the Town Hall was laid with much ceremony, on Queen Victoria's coronation day, 28 June 1838. The two-storey building was designed by the locally born Matthew Ellison Hadfield with his partner John Grey Weightman. It was completed by the end of 1842 and the scheme cost £8,500 (equivalent to £831,031 in 2025). The roof had a square turret housing a clock and bell by Lomas of Sheffield.

The form of the Town Hall – an arcaded space open to front and rear, and two rooms upstairs, facing onto the High Street – was similar to those found in many English towns from the late Middle Ages up to the Georgian era, and designed to provide a meeting place above and a covered market area below. Its Italian Renaissance style, which had been popular, was somewhat out of date for its time, with public buildings having been adopting the Classical style, with tastes turning towards the Gothic Revival. Matthew Ellison Hadfield was one of the pioneers of the Gothic Revival, and it is not clear why he adopted the Italian style for this building. A possibility is that he was just conforming to the conservative tastes of his client, the Duke, then aged 73. Had Hadfield had free rein, Glossop's town hall might have been in the much more modern Gothic style. The good proportions of the "Georgian Italianate", while distinguishing, are faintly out of place in the otherwise plainly 19th-century setting.

In the middle of the century, the chaotic development and resulting squalor and disorder of local mill towns such as Ashton and Stalybridge led to a drive in such towns to establish specific urban governance arrangements in the form of borough or urban district status, which came with new town halls in part to accommodate the new paid administrators. Until 1866, about 40 years after most towns of a similar size, Glossop continued to be run by the parish and manor, as the Howard estate owned virtually all the land and its agents controlled the local governance. There was, therefore, no need for offices within the Town Hall, as the administration was based at the Estate Office at Glossop Hall half a mile away. When a Borough Council was finally established, it held its meetings in the Town Hall, but its offices were scattered around the town.

The primary function of the upstairs rooms was as a home for the courts. Before the Victoria Hall was opened in the town in 1888, the Town Hall was practically the only place where balls, bazaars, sales of work, concerts, and public meetings could be held. It has also been the object of attack by-election rioters. It also had an important educational function; on 15 January 1856, Edmund Potter, owner of the largest calico printworks in the world and grandfather of Beatrix, gave a lecture there, to the Littlemoor & Howard Town Mechanics' Institution, on his researches into the town, entitled "A Picture of a Manufacturing District".

Henry Howard, 13th Duke of Norfolk, came into possession of the manor of Glossop on the death of his father and during his time he made many improvements in the town. One of his first acts was to obtain the Glossop Market Act in 1844, as the informal weekly market had grown steadily in size and was clearly meeting a local need, but required larger accommodation. The market hall, to the south of the Town Hall and connected to its arcade, was opened on 12 July 1845 and proved such a success that it was enlarged in 1854. Subsequent to the market opening, the arcade was used as the home of the Glossop Dale Savings Bank.

Another new function was for some prison cells; although the magistrates’ court, and most of the offenders, were now in Howard Town, the cells were still over in Old Glossop, and in 1841 Hadfield submitted plans for a cell block, but they were not completed until 1847. In 1853, 20 years after Stalybridge, Glossop got its own paid police force, volunteer constables having been keeping law and order up to that point. White's Directory in 1857 recorded a superintendent and four assistant constables based in the Town Hall. The cells were underground on the west side, but were soon closed after a county police station was built on Ellison Street.

In 1875, ready for the creation of a Rifle Volunteer Corps in the town, one half of the market hall was turned into a drill hall by Lord Howard for a nominal rental. The 23rd Glossop RVC was attached to the 6th Battalion, Cheshire Regiment even though it was in the adjacent county of Derbyshire; volunteers attended the Town Hall on 10 January 1865 to enroll.

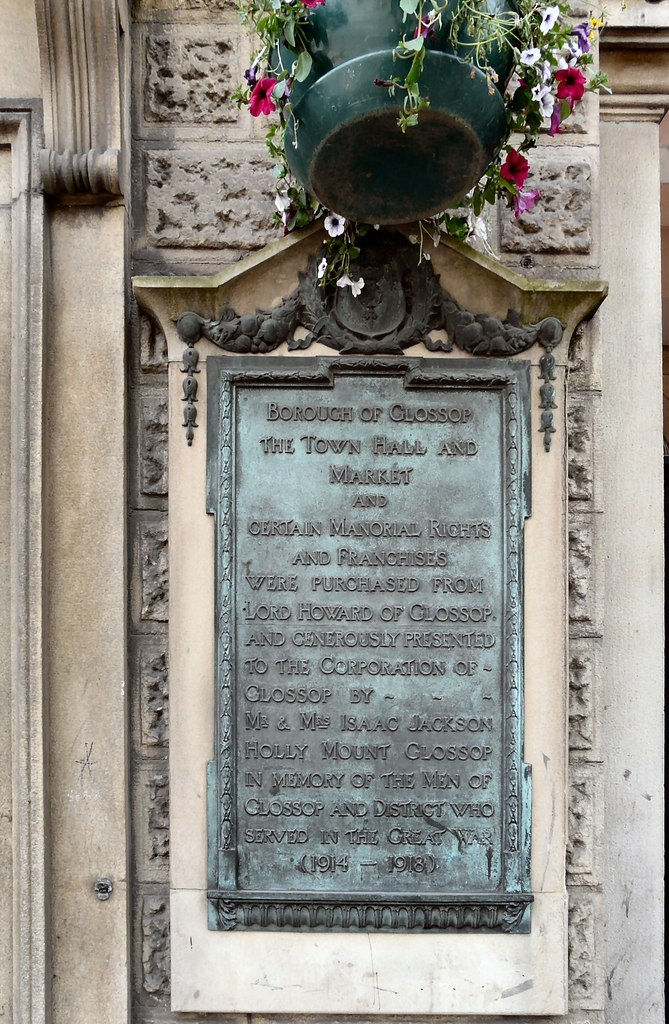
Bronze plaque on Glossop Town Hall marking its purchase and donation in 1919

In 1896, the Borough of Glossop acquired the leases, having rejected as "too expensive" Lord Howard's offer to sell the buildings outright for £10,000 (equivalent to £1,150,000 in 2025). The following year, as part of a package of improvements, the Borough added a Baroque cupola and weather vane to Hadfield's Italianate clock tower, creating a much larger structure which has since become a key town landmark. A new hour-striking clock was commissioned by Lord Howard from Potts of Leeds, and the Borough corporation provided a new bell.

The successful local industrialists Isaac and Harriet Jackson, who started as saddlers in Victoria Street, bought the Town Hall and market rights from Lord Howard in 1919 and presented them to the people of Glossop in honour of the fallen of the town in the Great War, with a bronze memorial plaque. This gave the Council the chance to bring its various offices and meeting rooms into one place, and it built and opened the Municipal Buildings at the south end of the Market Hall in 1923. This included a new purpose-built council chamber, formally marking the end of aristocratic dominance of the town and its affairs. The Howards sold all of their Glossop property and left, two years later.

Because the new Municipal Buildings had no suitable event facilities, the Council upgraded the Town Hall to make it a worthy venue for civic hospitality, adding flat-roofed, rendered extensions to either side of the smaller room at the rear, containing toilets, a kitchen and a Mayor's Parlour in which to entertain the Council's guests. In 1927, the jewellers and clock-makers Henry Fielding and Son paid for the clock tower, originally plain sandstone, to be “gilded and redecorated”, although the white paint on the dome is much more recent.

In 1974, Glossop became part of the Borough of High Peak, bringing to an end the Town Hall's role of hosting grand civic functions, as they moved to Buxton Pavilion Gardens. Social uses of the rooms continued, but alternative venues with more modern facilities now competed. Control of the magistrates' court also passed away from the local authority, and the rooms were unable to meet the requirements of the government Courts Service. The age of the fabric combined with lack of maintenance also began to take a visible toll, with water from the leaking gutters pouring down the walls of the stairwells and mouldy plaster falling away. Finally, in 2008, the court moved out after 165 years, and the building was closed. Subsequently, it was discovered that, as a result of earlier works to seal the leaking slates, the roof space was full of loose asbestos fibres, so it was impossible to gain access to the clock when it developed a fault, leaving the hands stuck at 12.

The complex is recorded in the National Heritage List for England as a Grade II listed building, having been designated on 4 December 1958. Grade II is the lowest of the three grades of listing, and is applied to "buildings that are nationally important and of special interest". The listing also includes the overall High Street West terrace of which the Town Hall is the centrepiece, and the iron railings and boundary piers to the market ground.

== Present use ==
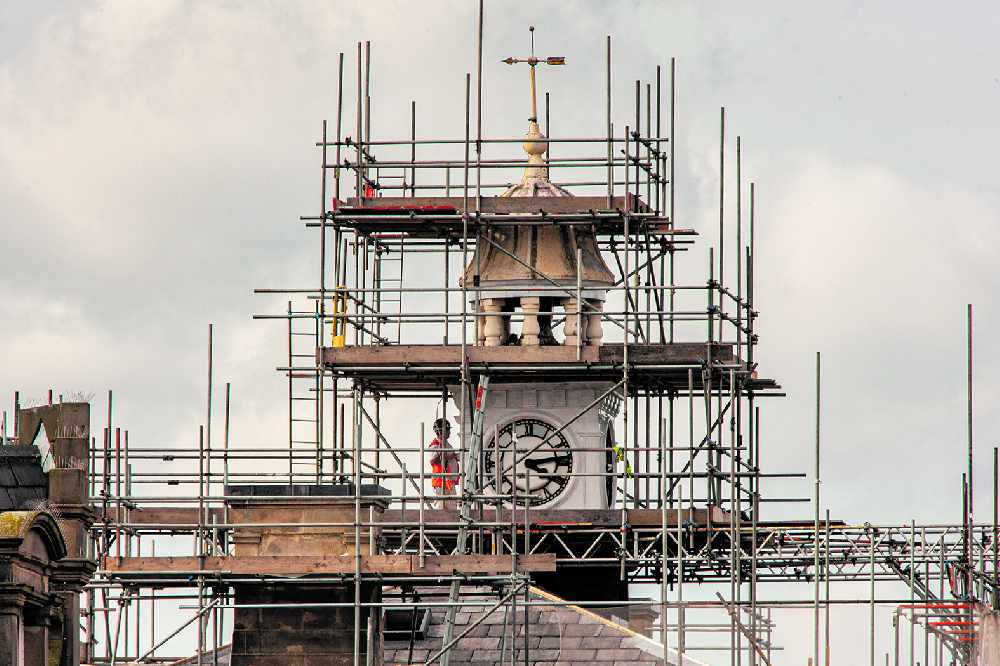
Scaffolding around the clock during restoration works, 2019

The Municipal Buildings is used as office accommodation and a base for High Peak Borough Council, and the Market Hall still trades as a market three days a week. The Town Hall, which has been out of use since 2008 due to accessibility issues and limited use, has seen investment to conserve the building. A plan by the development trust Locality to turn Glossop Town Hall into arts venue was reported in 2013. The roof was replaced in 2012, and the clock was repaired and refurbished in 2019 by HPBC and Smith of Derby. A multi-million pound external refurbishment of the Town Hall and market hall was undertaken through 2019, by G F Tomlinson Group of Derby.

A further £2 million renovation was announced in August 2020 for the whole of the Town Hall, Market Hall and Municipal Buildings complex. It will create a business start-up space, with a focus on creative industries and multi-use event space accommodating food and drink and retail businesses. Additional sustainability features for energy and carbon reduction are included.

== See also ==
- Listed buildings in Glossop
