= Glossop Tramway =

Former tramway in Derbyshire, England

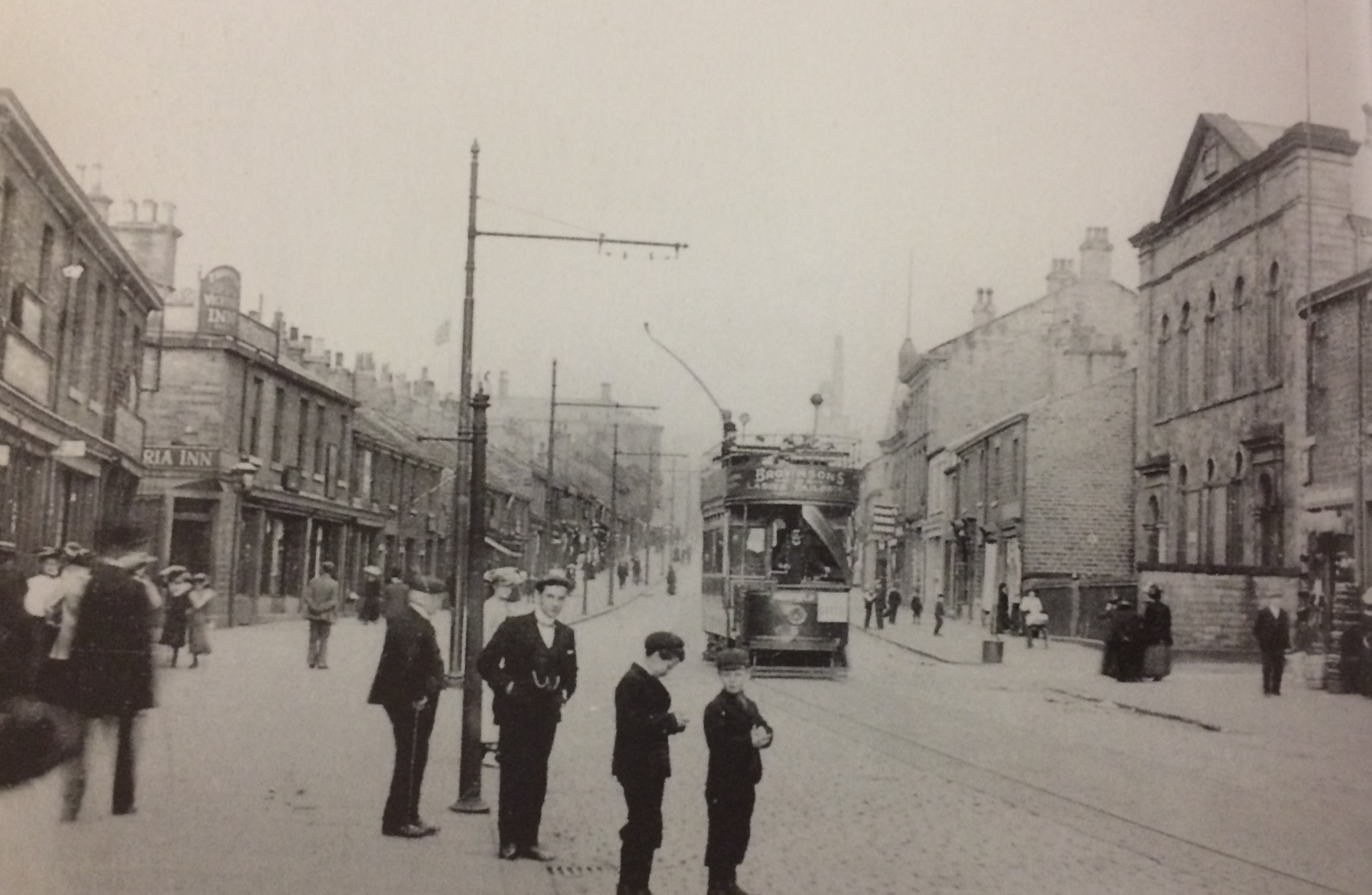
- Tram No.5 on High Street West near Arundel Street

Operation
- Locale: Glossopdale, Derbyshire
- Open: 20 August 1903
- Close: 24 December 1927
- Status: Closed
- Owner: Urban Electric Supply Company

Infrastructure
- Track gauge: 1,435 mm (4 ft 8 1/2 in)
- Propulsion system: Electric
- Stock: 7x Milnes; 1x Brill 21E; 1x ERCTW

Statistics
- Route length: 4.5 miles (7.2 km)
Overview

The Glossop Tramway was a 4.5-mile (7.2 km) long passenger tramway service connecting the mill towns of Glossop and Hadfield in Derbyshire, England. It was authorised by the Board of Trade in 1901 and was opened in 1903 on a gauge of 4 ft 8 1/2 in (1,435 mm). It was closed in 1927, with the branch to Whitfield closing in 1919.

Glossop's was the second electric tramway in Derbyshire, opening three years after that of Ilkeston. It was a private enterprise run by the Urban Electric Supply Company, which also owned the Camborne and Redruth Tramway in distant Cornwall. The line was in the form of an inverted C, with the main termini at Hadfield and Old Glossop, with a short spur that terminated at Whitfield.

== History ==
=== Context ===
In the late 19th century, Glossop and Hadfield, which sit at the base of Longdendale in the South Pennines, were spread-out settlements with many works and factories strung along the routes between them. The valley bottom was populated by cotton mills making use of water power. Although the Sheffield, Ashton-under-Lyne and Manchester Railway had opened stations at Glossop, Hadfield and Dinting in 1844-5, urban public transport, to connect the areas where workers lived with the town centre mills, did not exist. The first service came with the introduction by the Glossop Carriage Company in the early 1890s of a horse-drawn omnibus from the Norfolk Hotel at Howard Town to the Commercial Inn at Bankbottom in Hadfield, which ran three times daily.

=== Origin ===
Glossop, being a small mill town with a population of around only 22,000, was an unusual choice for a new urban tramway. However, there was a large supply of potential customers in the cotton workers holding jobs at the many factories. Additionally, the Stalybridge, Hyde, Mossley and Dukinfield Joint Board (SHMD) network was being developed to run to Mottram, only 2 miles (3.2 km) from the county boundary, which may have offered the possibility of a future connection.

The Glossop Corporation (borough council) had been negotiating with a small number of private companies to exercise its powers to provide electrical lighting and supply since 1898, and an agreement was made with the Urban Electric Supply Company (UESCo) in December 1899. The UESCo was itself a subsidiary of Edmundsons Electricity Corporation, which controlled numerous electricity supply companies across the country, as well as the Scarborough Tramways Company. Edmunsons advised the corporation that, should it wish to establish a tramway in the future, it would be much cheaper to do those works at the same time as the power and lighting supply were installed than to put one in later. They came to an agreement that the UESCo would build, operate and take on the risk of the tramway under similar terms to the electrical contract, and the corporation would authorise the seeking of a provisional order under the Tramways Act 1870, which it did in August 1900. There was an attempted amendment to extend the route into Padfield, which was prevented by a low railway arch at Platt Street, and also an objection from the railway to the tramway passing under Dinting Viaduct, but the order passed its readings in the Lords and Commons. Authority for the tramway was given by the Board of Trade and by Parliament under the Glossop Electric Tramways Order 1901.

The UESCo appointed local magistrate and electrical engineer Charles Edward Knowles was appointed manager of the project, and Leo Arthur Hards MIEE, an expert electric tramway engineer with the UESCo, was given responsibility for the layout of the system. It was planned as a 4-mile (6.4 km) inverted 'C', with the north-west terminus in Hadfield, and the north-east at Old Glossop, joining relatively undeveloped stretches of roadway peppered with factories and large mills. A half-mile spur, known as the Whitfield Branch, ran south of the main track to Charlestown. The route was planned to be standard gauge, like other tramways in the Manchester region, powered by overhead catenary, and single-track with passing loops. For the depot and power station, a site on the north bank of the Glossop Brook at Dinting was selected. Tracklaying began in December 1902. Seven open top, double decker tramcars with reversed stairs were ordered.

The power station was functional by August 1903 and the formal opening for passengers was set for the 20th. However, the Board of Trade deferred its final inspection until the 21st, though the opening ceremony went ahead as scheduled, with a ceremony and an inaugural tramcar which took dignitaries on a tour of the whole system. Public services started the following day (21 August 1903).

=== Operation ===
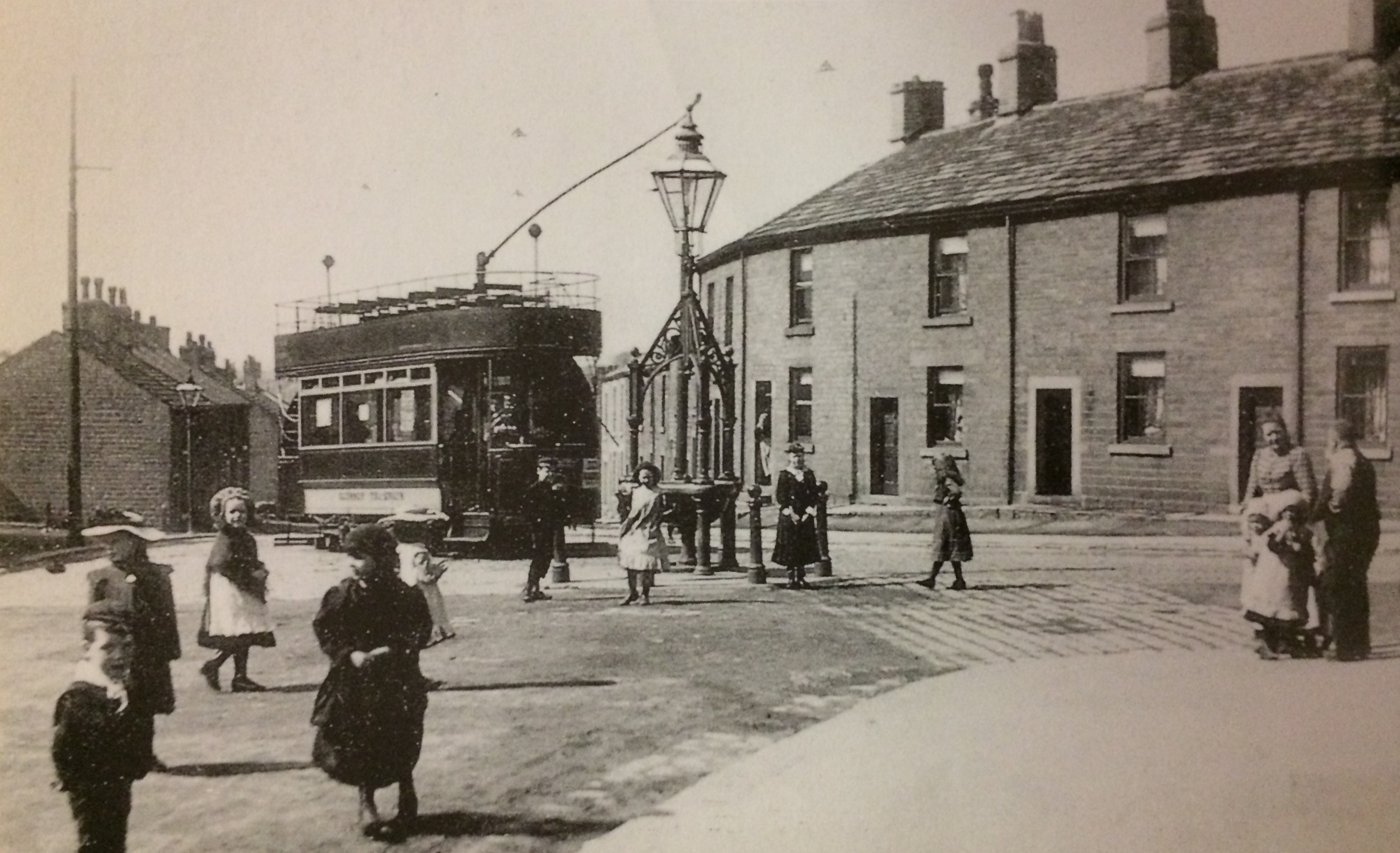
Westbound tram at the corner of High Street East and Hall Street (now Manor Park Road), c. 1903

There was initial success upon the tramway's opening. It ran a 15-minute service with a one-hour round trip time, which required four cars, each with a driver and conductor, to operate. Services divided at Glossop with alternate cars taking the Whitfield and Old Glossop routes. 8,505 passengers used the system within the first two days, averaging 20,000 per week over the first three months. This popularity forced the railway to reduce its fares, with the tramway attracting three-quarters of passenger traffic between Glossop and Hadfield. The fare for the whole journey between termini was 2d, but later penny stages (and halfpenny stages for workmen) were introduced.

Despite the high number of Hadfield to Glossop journeys, a lack of demand was soon demonstrated for the Whitfield branch. A one-man, single-deck demi-car was purchased from the British Electric Car Company (BEC) to take over shuttle operations on the spur in August 1904, the same year the tramway's only recorded accident occurred, in the form of a runaway tram which lost control, sped down Victoria Street and collided with a shopfront in High Street.

The financial viability of the tramway came into doubt within only a few years; revenues began to fall sharply in 1905 as the cotton industry, on whose workers the tramway was dependent for most of its passengers, began to experience depressions. The company paid no dividend from 1910 to 1920, with the profits made insufficient to cover the ongoing maintenance of the track and trams. Though royal assent was gained for the Stalybridge, Hyde, Mossley and Dukinfield Tramways and Electricity Board Act 1915 (5 & 6 Geo. 5. c. lxi) which included a plan to create a connection with the SHMD, this attempt did not succeed. World War I necessitated the first use of female conductors by the tramway. By the end of the war in 1918, a run-down Glossop Tramway was left with a backlog of repairs after several years of minimal investment and labour shortage. It resulted in 1918 in the originally temporary closure of the less-used Whitfield branch line, in response to a Board of Trade request for tramways to save coal by reducing miles travelled, but this became a permanent closure.

=== Decline and closure ===
Terminal troubles began after the war with the tramway facing significant costs needed for works to renew its track, and also public dissatisfaction with the service. Journey frequency went down as the tramway tried to save money. Glossop Borough Council asked for the wartime economy closure of the Whitfield branch to be reversed but this did not happen. In June 1920, a ten-day strike was held by the tram crews disgruntled at their reduced working hours and to improve wages, though they did not win the dispute. The system was fast becoming a liability to the UESCo, which offered it for sale to the council in the same month, which was declined.

By 1923, motorbuses were providing unwelcome competition along the tram route, while revenue and mileage on the trams continued to slide. A final offer was made to offload to the council in November 1927, this time to hand over the tramway, whose infrastructure was reaching a dangerous state, for free if the borough agreed to buy electricity off the UESCo. It was again refused, and the announcement was subsequently made that Glossop Tramway would be closed in its entirety on at 23.00 on 24 December 1927. The North Western Road Car Company took over the disused route with a motorbus service from 26 December.

== Route infrastructure ==
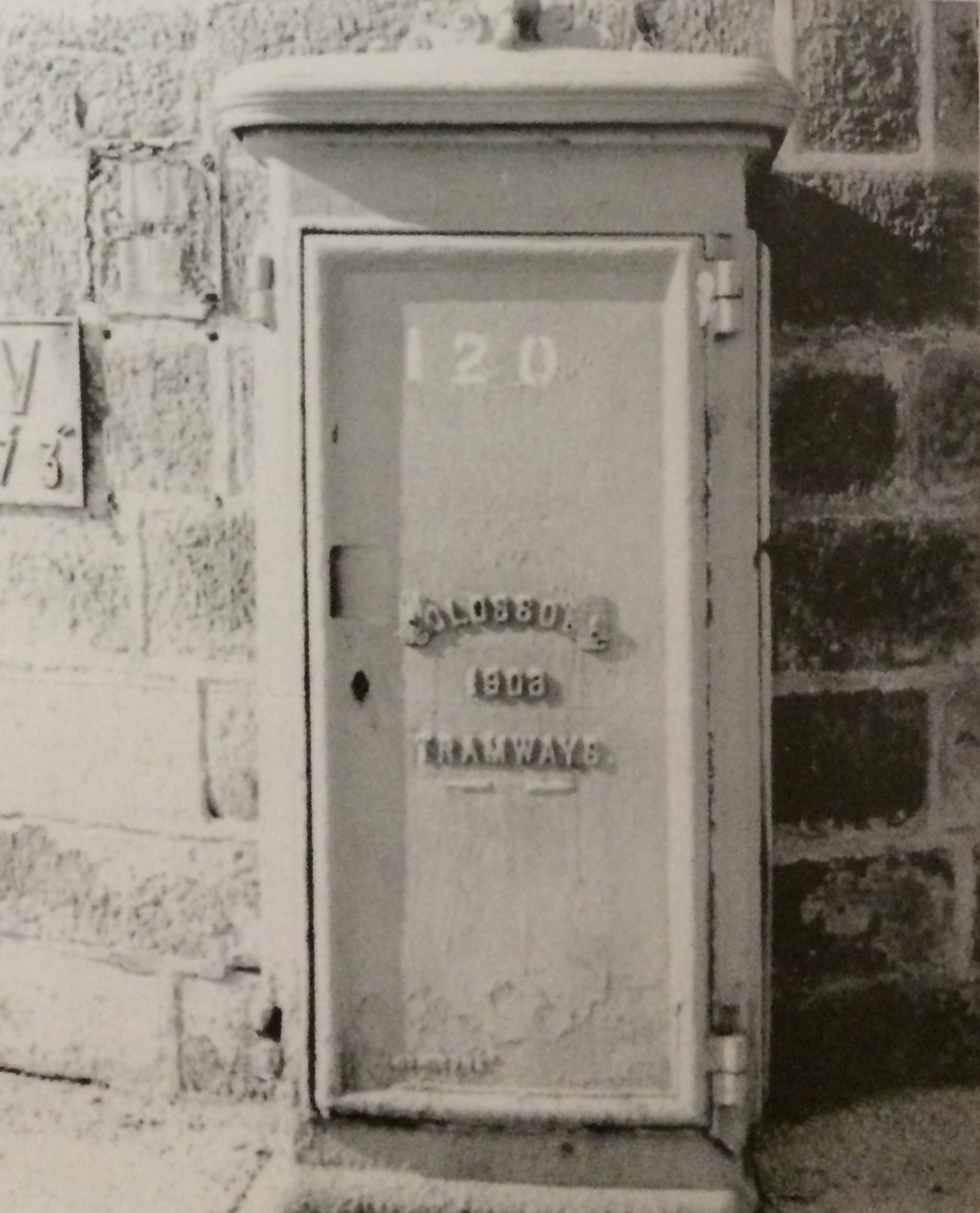
Glossop Tramways junction box

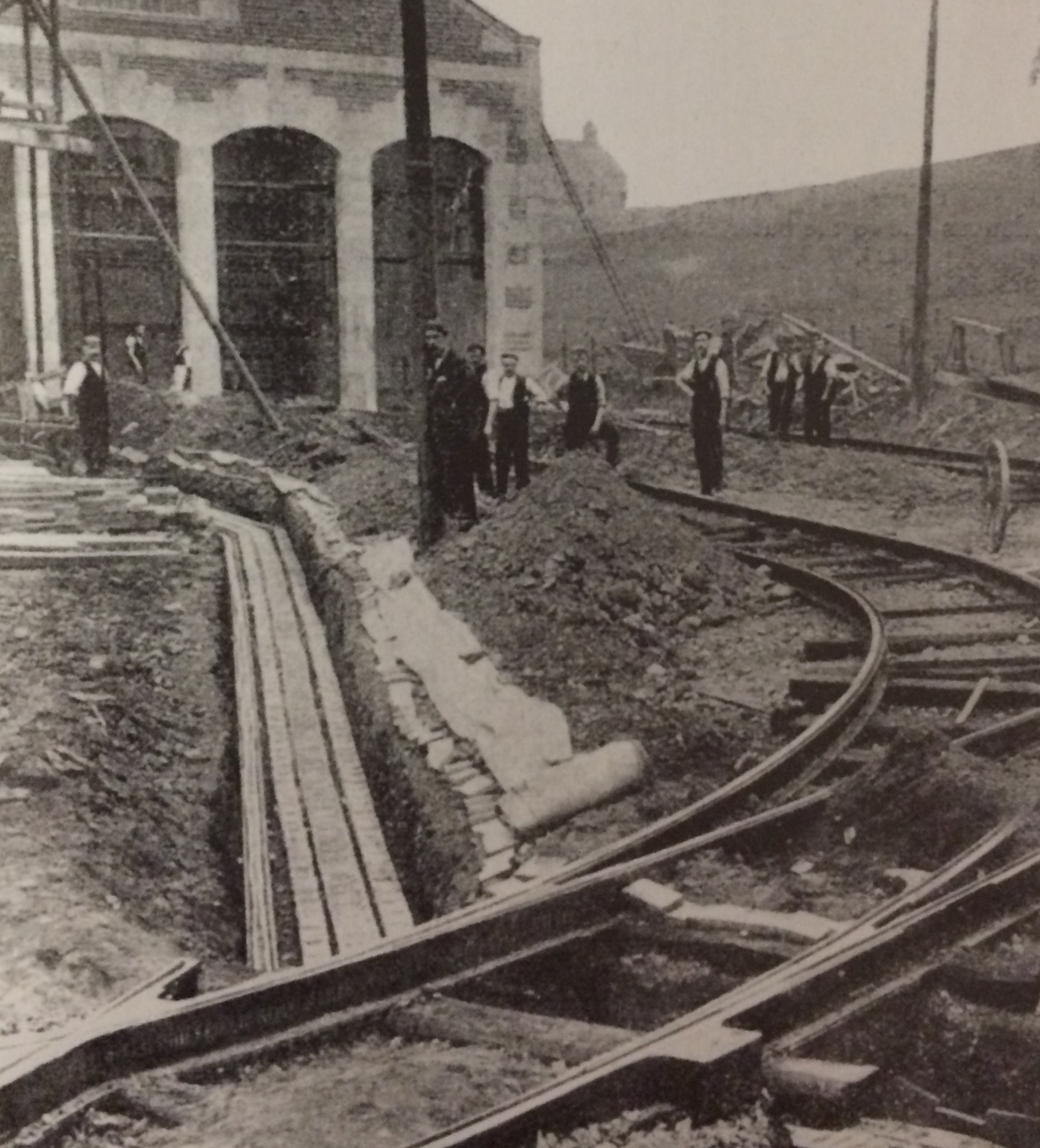
Laying of the tramlines and feeder cable from the completed depot

The Glossop Electric Tramways Order 1901, under which the route was authorised, provided for a single-track tramway connecting the Great Central Railway's Hadfield station - which had through services from Manchester to Sheffield via the Woodhead line - with the Queen's Arms Hotel in Old Glossop, via Woolley Bridge, Brookfield and the centre of Glossop (Howard Town). The Hadfield terminus was situated on a loop immediately outside the Palatine Hotel opposite the station. The line, which extended to 4.56 miles (7.34 km), was designed to serve as many of the mills of Glossopdale as possible, and included a branch line of 0.5 miles (0.8 km) from Norfolk Square the gates of Whitfield House at Charlestown. There were nine passing loops on the main line and one on the Whitfield line, as well as terminus loops. A proposal by Councillor Braddock that the Hadfield end of route should extend to Post Street in Padfield was rejected on the grounds that it would not be economical.

Underground cables from the power plant paralleled the track, with a cast iron feeder pillar (or box) every half mile, from which the current was fed up to the overhead wires, through wires in the tram poles. Each pillar contained switches and fuses to allow isolation of both the underground cables and overhead wires if anything went wrong in any half-mile section. Telephone cables ran alongside the tramway cables, with telephones in all the feeder pillars to enable communication with the generating station.

The tramway remained physically isolated from neighbouring systems, the closest being the Stalybridge, Hyde, Mossley and Dukinfield Joint Board tramway at Mottram, less than two miles distant.

== Rolling stock ==
Nine vehicles were used on the tramway during its existence. Upon opening in 1903, the service was operated using seven double-deck tramcars manufactured by G. F. Milnes of Hadley, Shropshire, which had reversed stairs and were painted in dark green and primrose. Their capacity was 22 inside and 26 on the open top deck. Numbers 1-7 were supplemented in 1904 by a British Electric Car Company (BEC) single-deck tram with a custom-made truck of 6 ft wheelbase, which ran the shuttle to Whitfield. This demi-car was one of the first nationally to be fitted with the innovative new regenerative braking system refined by Alfred Raworth, aiming to use their reduced size and weight and regenerative control system to save on electricity usage by 25%. A second single-decker from Sheffield, built by ERTCW on a 7-foot (2,100 mm) Brill 21E truck, was procured in 1918. It had been No. 56 in Sheffield and was new in 1899. All types were withdrawn in 1927.

Fleet numbers	Type	Builder	Dates of service
1-7	Double-deck	Milnes	1903-1927
8	Single-deck demi-car	BEC	1904-1927 (Sheffield 1899-1904)
9	Single-deck	Brill/ERTCW	1918-1927

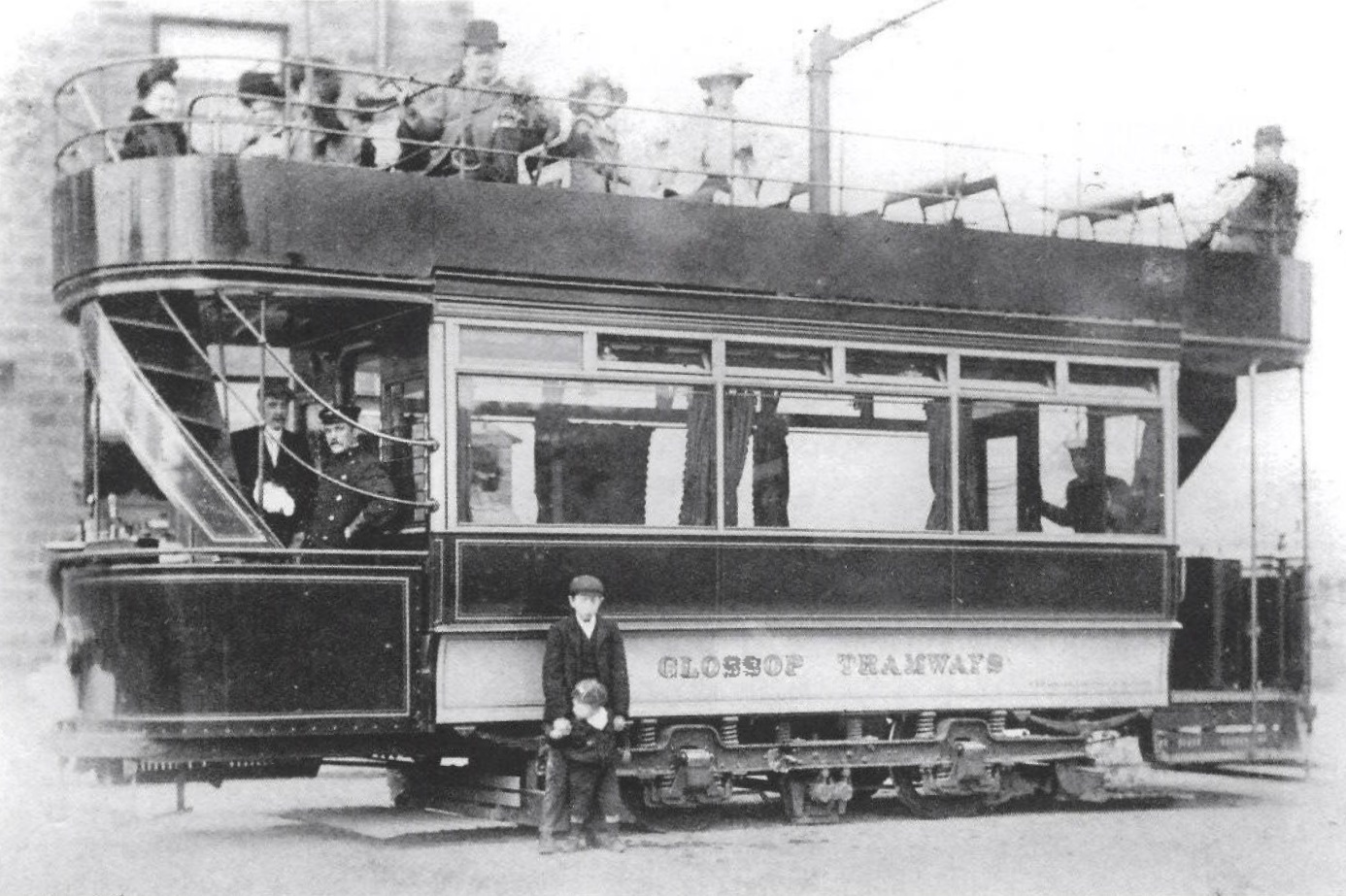
Side view of one of the new trams in 1903 including the livery, truck and track brake. Note the luxury of lower saloon curtaining.

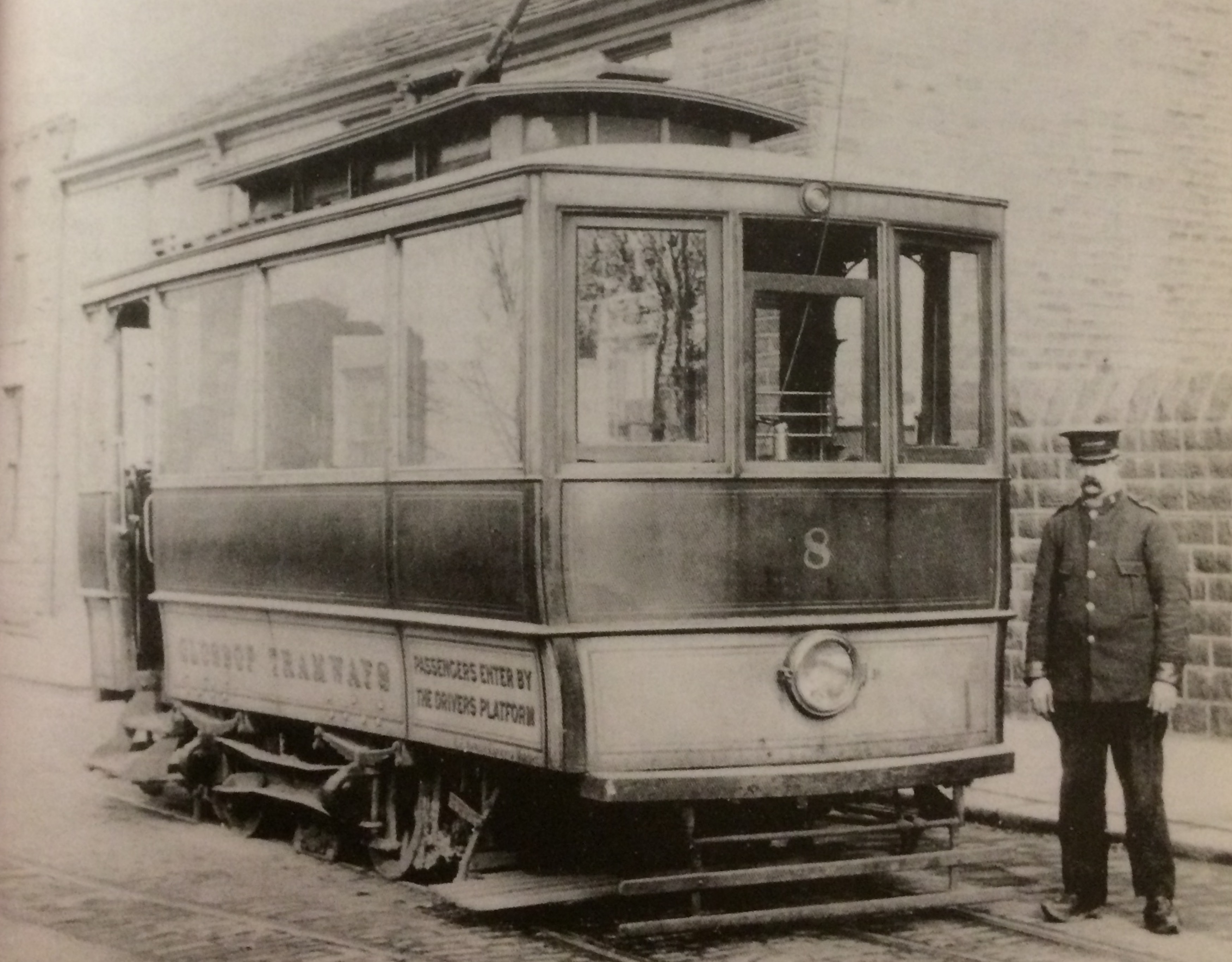
Demi-car 8 at the Charlestown Road terminus loop at what is now the entrance to Glossop Fire Station

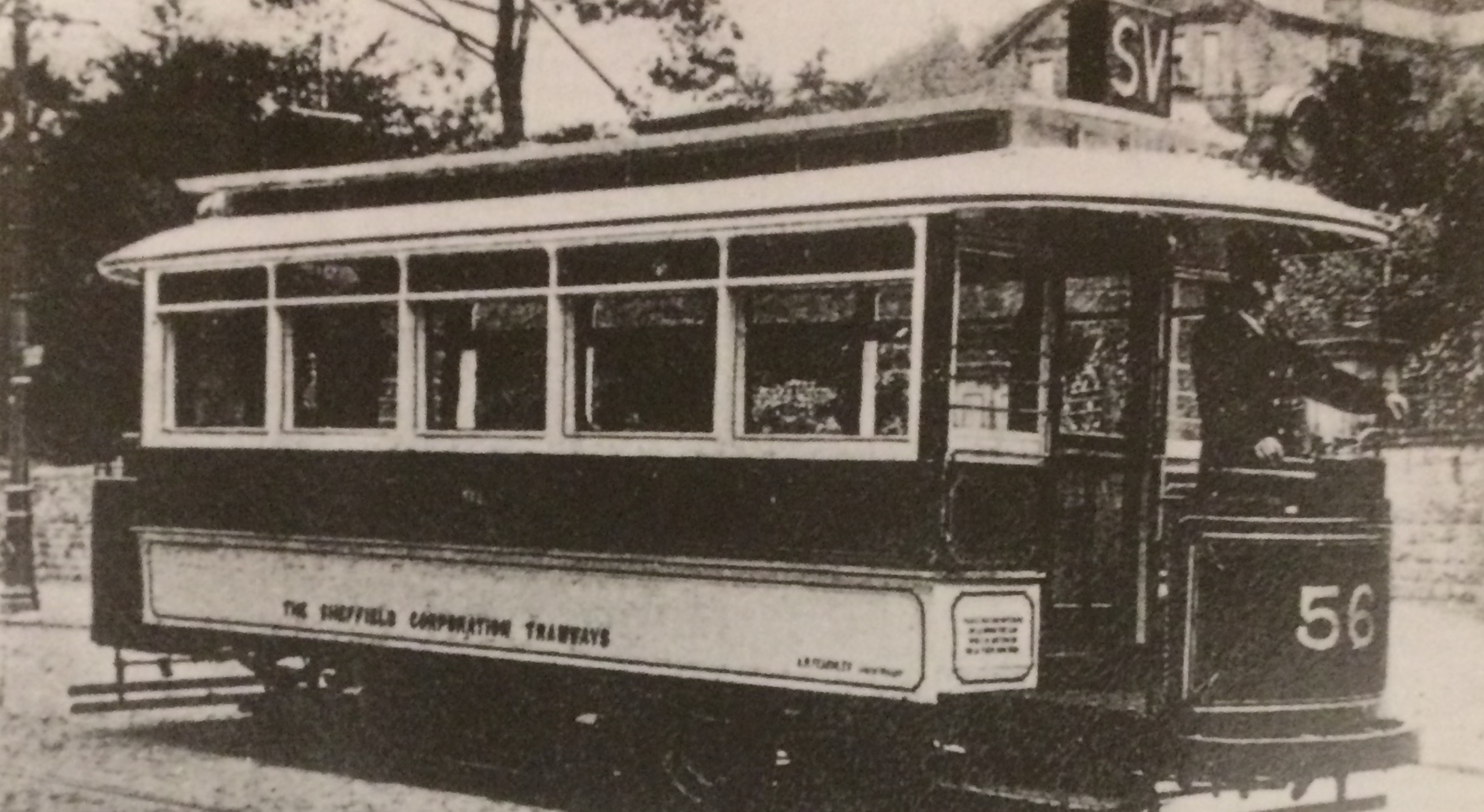
Sheffield Tramways No.56 before entering service in Glossop

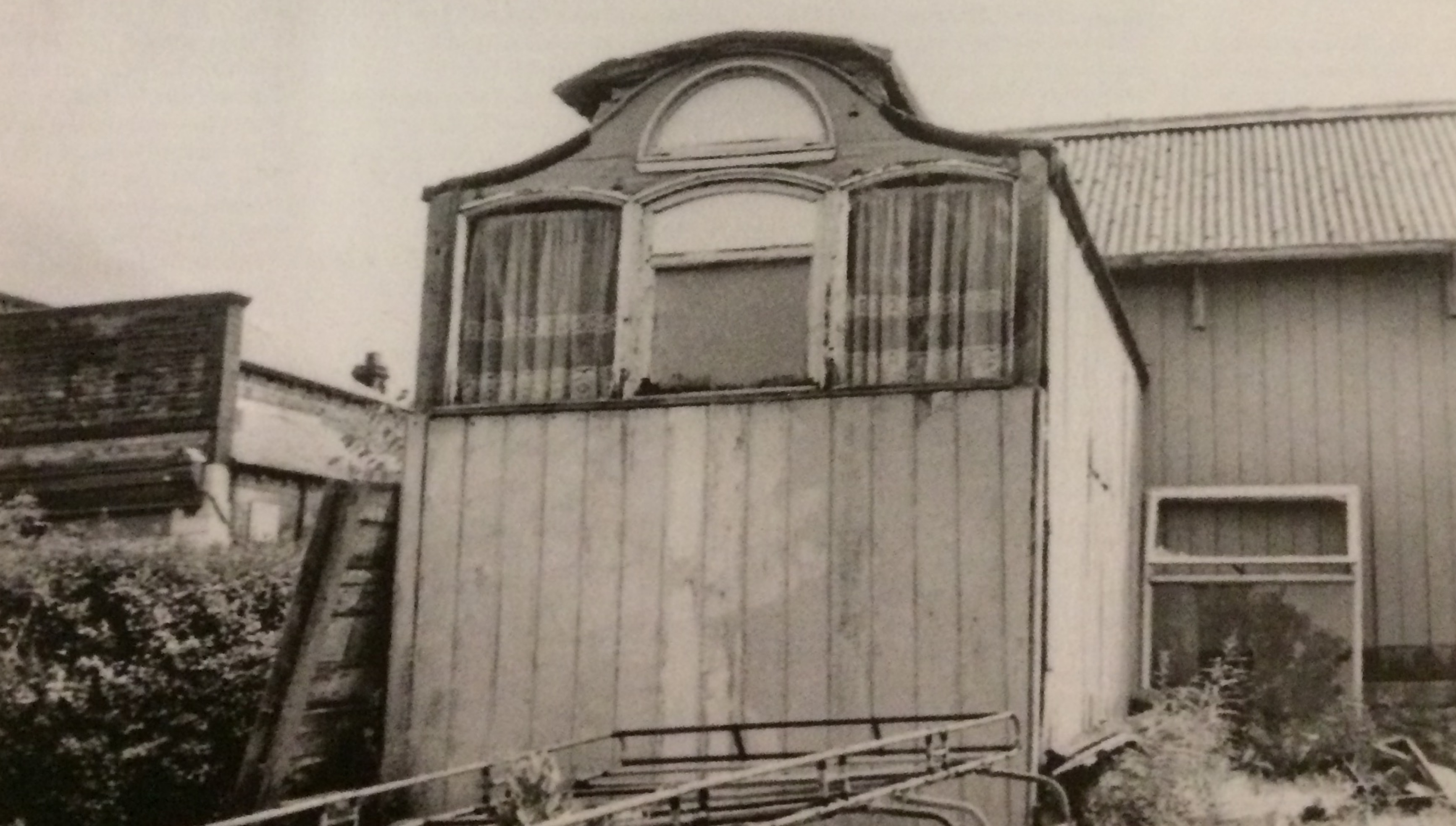
After the closure of the tramway, the car bodies were sold off locally. One of them, possibly No.8, saw service as part of a hairdressing salon alongside the Spread Eagle Inn at Woolley Bridge.

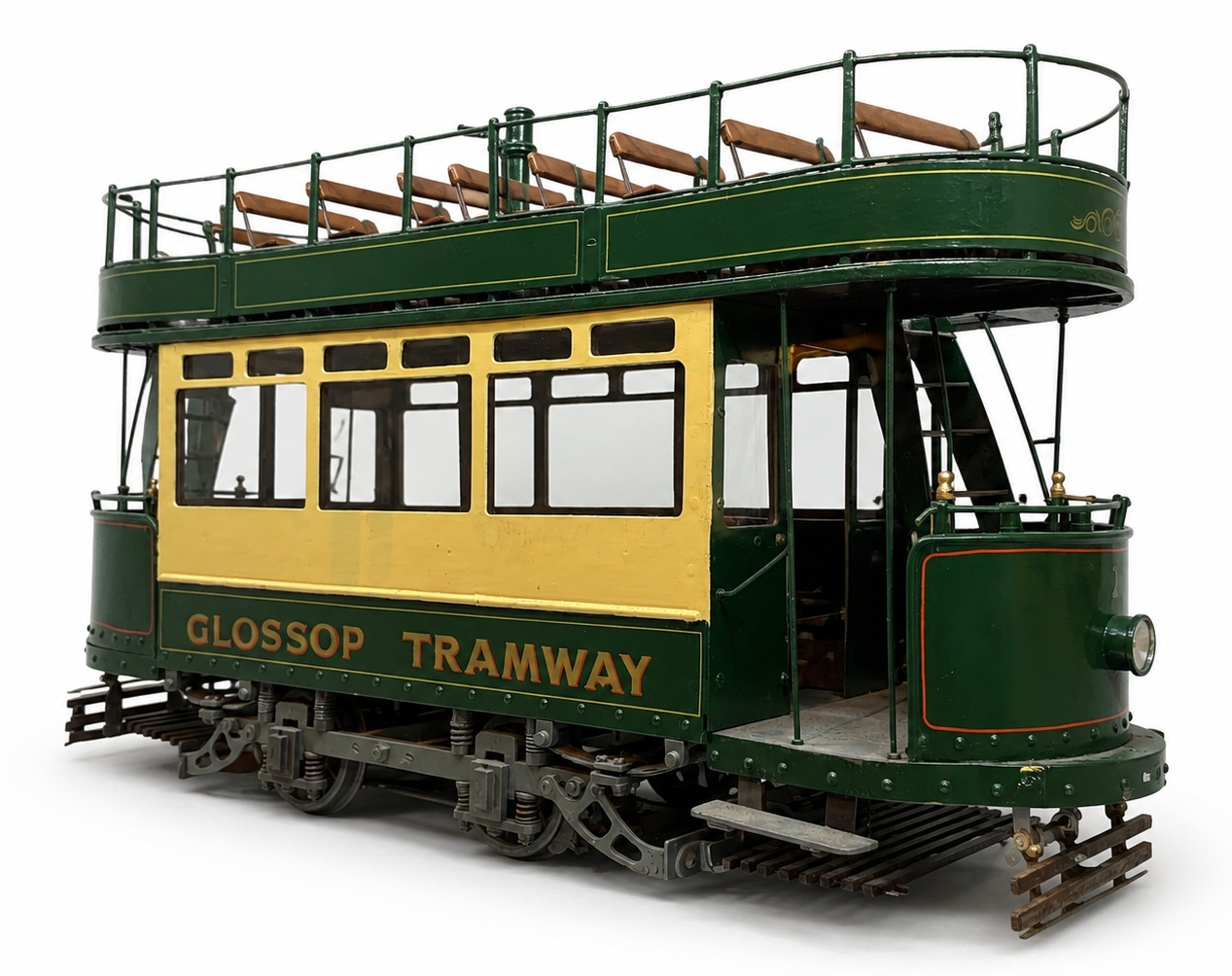
Scale model of a Glossop Milnes tram

== Depot ==
The UESCo's offices and combined electricity generating plant and tram depot was accessed by a gap between houses on High Street West and across a bridge over Glossop Brook. The tram shed contained four pits while the power plant included a high-speed steam engine, made by Belliss and Morcom, with a direct drive to the dynamos, constructed by Thomas Parker of Wolverhampton. There were also two boilers and two large sets of accumulators - one for traction and the other for the borough's lighting. 500 volts of current was generated by the dynamos and taken to a switchboard to be divided by the lighting and tramway systems.

After the 1927 closure of the tramway, the buildings remained in industrial use. Once electricity generation had been moved elsewhere (the Urban Electric Supply Company was abolished and nationalised on 31 March 1948 under the terms of the Electricity Act 1947), Lancashire Chemicals and then the Plater Group occupied the premises.

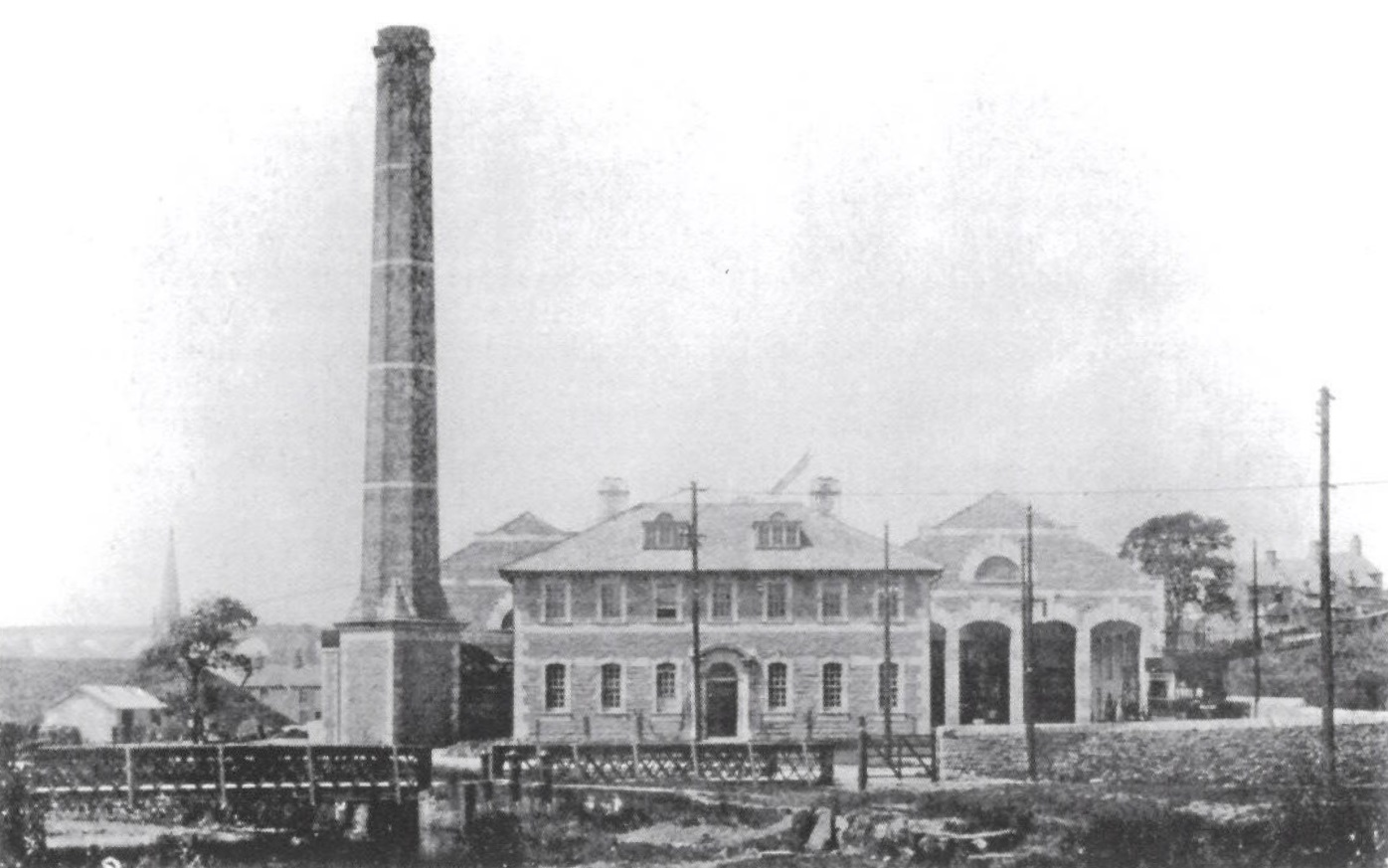
The depot complex c. 1910. The Glossop Brook iron bridge appears in the foreground.

Map of the depot's location off High Street West

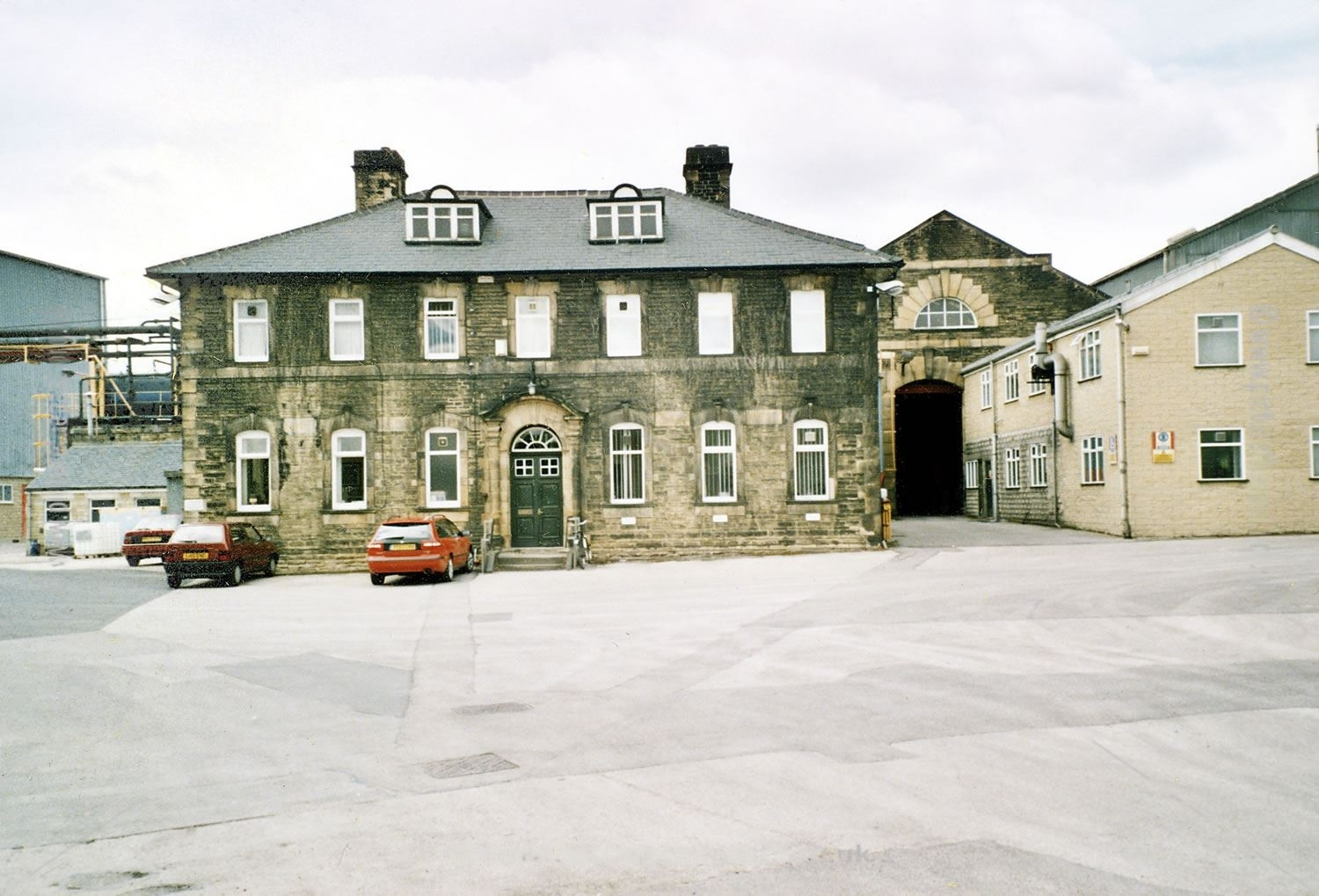
Site of the former depot c. 1980s

== Uniforms ==
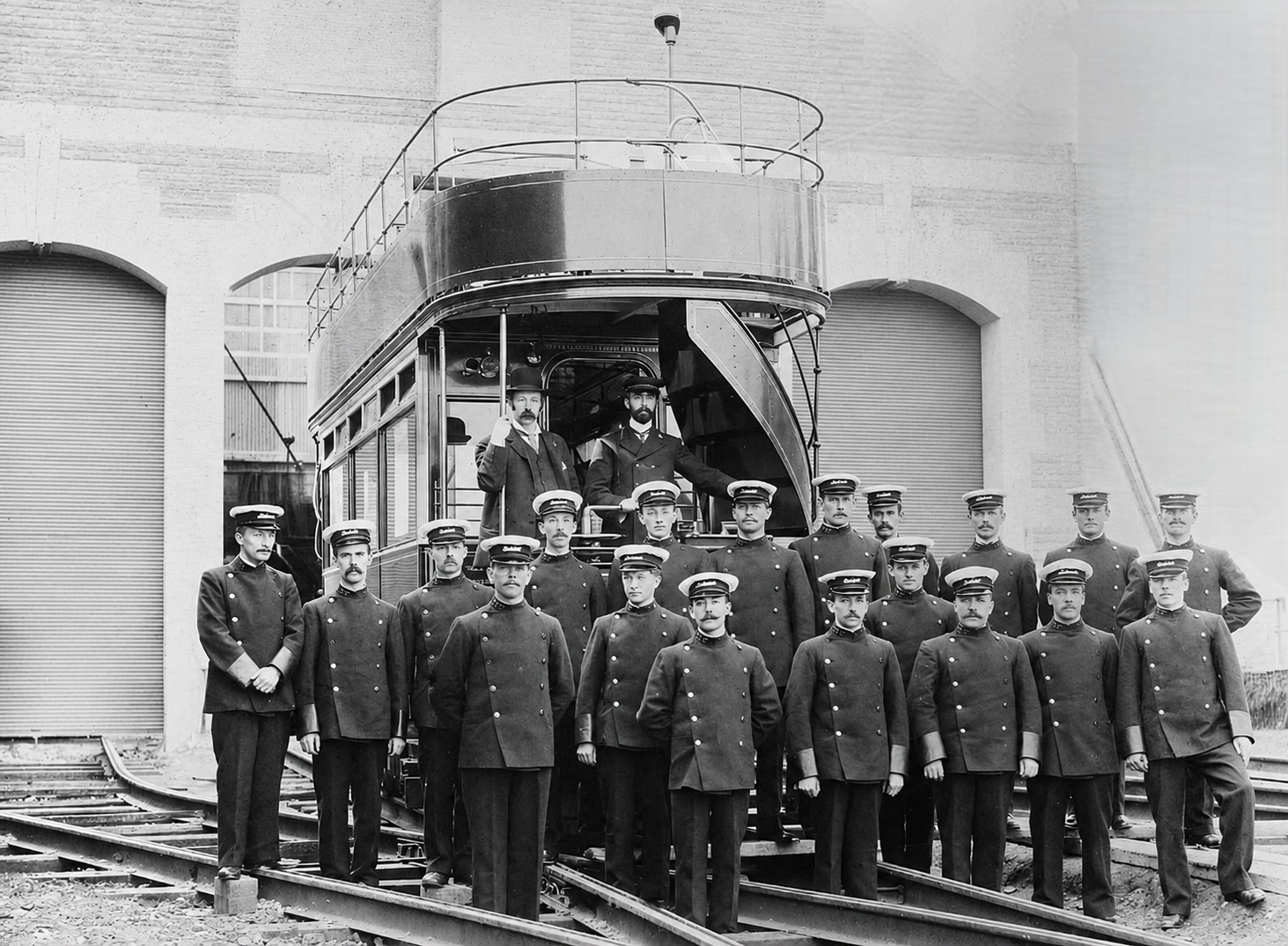
Motormen and conductors parade in smart 'maternity jacket' rig, including white-topped caps, in front of one of the new cars outside the Dinting tram shed at the start of the service

Employees of Glossop Tramway wore at least two uniforms over its twenty-four years. It began by issuing a militaresque outfit consisting of a double-breasted tunic with five pairs of buttons and upright collars, which bore metal insignia stating 'UESCo' on one side and the employee's number on the other, and peaked caps with a brass badge reading either 'Motorman' or 'Conductor' in script lettering.

A second uniform is visible in photographs from the mid-Edwardian era, to a single-breasted jacket design with new hip pockets and different collars, and five brass buttons. This changed within a couple of years to a jacket with breast pockets and epaulettes. Double-breasted greatcoats were also issued for the cold weather.
