= Listed buildings in Glossop =

Glossop is a market town in the High Peak district of Derbyshire, England. The town and surrounding areas, which include Dinting and Old Glossop, contain 56 listed buildings that are recorded in the National Heritage List for England. All the listed buildings are designated at Grade II, the lowest of the three grades, which is applied to "buildings of national importance and special interest". The town originated in what is now Old Glossop, where the older buildings are to be found, and in the 19th century its centre moved to the southwest, into the area known as New Glossop, or Howard Town centred around Norfolk Square. Most of the listed buildings are houses, cottages and farmhouses and associated structures, and the others include churches and items in churchyards, chapels, some of which have been converted for other uses, shops, public houses, public buildings, a market cross, a drinking trough, a former cotton mill, a railway station, a school, a bank, a theatre, a war memorial, and a pair of telephone kiosks.

== Buildings ==
Name and location	Photograph	Date	Notes
All Saints' Church, Old Glossop; 53.45026°N 1.93889°W		14th century	The church, which was altered and extended in the 19th and early 20th centuries, is in millstone grit with Welsh slate roofs. It consists of a nave with a clerestory, north and south aisles, a south porch, a chancel with a north chapel and a south organ chamber and vestry, and a west steeple. The steeple has a tower with angle buttresses, a square-headed west doorway in a pointed arch, over which is a three-light window, and a clock face. The bell openings have two lights and hood moulds, and the tower is surmounted by an octagonal broach spire with two tiers of gabled lucarnes.
The Market Cross; 53.45008°N 1.93814°W		15th century (probable)	The market cross is in millstone grit. It has an octagonal shaft on a square plinth, and has pyramid stops, a moulded base and a moulded cap. On the top is a Celtic cross that was added in 1912.
Bull's Head Public House; 53.45073°N 1.93909°W		c. 1605	A weaver's house, later rebuilt and extended, and converted into a public house. It is in millstone grit, with quoins, and a roof of Welsh slate and stone slate, with a coped gable and kneelers on the right. There are three storeys, three bays, a two-storey single-bay extension on the right, and a single-storey extension at the rear. The doorway has a flush surround, and the windows are casements, some with mullions, and the windows in the right extension have Tudor hood moulds.
16 and 18 Church Street South; 53.45010°N 1.93798°W		Early 17th century	A pair of houses in millstone grit, with quoins and stone slate roofs. There are two storeys and a complex plan. The windows are mullioned and contain casements.
34 Church Street South; 53.45041°N 1.93842°W		Early 17th century	The house is in millstone grit, rendered at the rear, with quoins and a stone slate roof. There are two storeys, two bays, and a rear lean-to. On the front is a doorway with a chamfered surround and, to the right, a doorway with a flush surround. In the upper floor is a sliding sash window, at the rear are casement windows, and the other windows are mullioned.
36 Church Street South; 53.45049°N 1.93847°W		Mid-17th century	The house is in millstone grit, rendered on the left return and at the rear, with quoins, and a stone slate roof with coped gables and kneelers. There are two storeys and attics, a single-storey extension on the left, and two gabled bays. The doorway has a chamfered surround and a four-centred arched head, and above it is a blocked window. The windows are mullioned and transomed with four lights, and in the attic are three-light mullioned windows. Inside the house are two inglenook fireplaces.
28, 28A and 30 Church Street South; 53.45022°N 1.93840°W		Late 17th century	A farmhouse, later three cottages, in millstone grit, with quoins, and a stone slate roof with coped gables and kneelers. There are two storeys, and it consists of a two-bay range, and a two-bay gabled cross-wing on the right, with a single-storey lean-to at the end. On the front are two doorways with flush surrounds, and a blocked doorway with a quoined surround and a massive lintel, and there is a doorway with a flush surround in the cross-wing. Most of the windows are mullioned.
12 and 14 Wellgate; 53.45096°N 1.93825°W		Late 17th century	Two cottages combined into a house, it is in millstone grit, with overhanging eaves and a stone slate roof. There are two storeys and three bays, and a single-storey extension with an attic on the left. The windows are mullioned and contain casements.
32 Church Street South; 53.45033°N 1.93842°W		c. 1700	The house is in millstone grit with quoins and a stone slate roof. There are two storeys and one bay. On the front is a doorway, and in each floor is a four-light mullioned window containing casements.
Higher Dinting Farmhouse; 53.44923°N 1.96468°W	—	1728	The farmhouse is in millstone grit, with quoins, and a stone slate roof with coped gables and kneelers. There are two storeys and four bays, and a two-storey rear outshut. The doorway has a chamfered surround, and an ornately carved lintel, with initials and the date in a shaped medallion, flanked by inscribed roundels. The windows are casements, with some mullions remaining.
Pyegrove and Pyegrove House; 53.44576°N 1.92907°W		1747	A farmhouse, later two houses, in millstone grit, partly rendered, with quoins, and a stone slate roof. There are two storeys and an irregular plan. Some windows are mullioned, some have lost their mullions, and there are later casement windows. Features include a doorway with a dated and initialled lintel.
56 Church Street; 53.45010°N 1.94091°W		Mid-18th century	Two cottages and a workshop, later combined into a house in millstone grit with quoins and a stone slate roof. There are two storeys, and an L-shaped plan, consisting of a front of two bays and a rear wing. In the centre is a doorway converted into a window, with a small square window above, and to the right is a doorway with a flush surround. The windows on the front are sliding sashes, and in the left return are two casement windows.
22 and 22A Church Street South; 53.45020°N 1.93807°W		Mid-18th century	A pair of weavers' cottages, later houses, in millstone grit, the sides and rear wing rendered, with a roof of tile to the main range, and Welsh slate and stone slate to the rear wing. There are three storeys, a front of three bays, and a single-storey rear wing. On the front are two doorways with flush surrounds, and most of the windows are mullioned and contain casements.
14 Church Street South; 53.44997°N 1.93802°W		Late 18th century	A house in millstone grit with a stone slate roof. There are two storeys, a double depth plan, and two bays. The central doorway has a flush surround, and the windows are mullioned with three lights.
Royle House; 53.45020°N 1.94405°W		Late 18th century	A presbytery, rebuilt in 1836 by M. E. Hadfield and T. E Weightman, it is in millstone grit on a plinth, with overhanging eaves on paired brackets, and a hipped Welsh slate roof. There are two storeys, east and west fronts of four bays, and a single-storey extension to the north. The windows are sashes, and there is a tall round-headed stair window.
Bodycheck; 53.44125°N 1.94986°W		1811	A church designed by M. E. Hadfield, it was enlarged in 1845, and converted for other uses in the 20th century. It is in millstone grit with a moulded cornice and a Welsh slate roof, and has a rectangular plan, with a polygonal apse. The entrance front has a protruding centre with quoins and an open pediment. In the ground floor are three round-arched windows flanked by round-arched doorways, all with moulded surrounds. Above is a Venetian window and a small semicircular opening. On the sides are two tiers of windows, and on the apse is a bellcote over a semicircular opening.
Norfolk Arms Public House; 53.44358°N 1.94908°W		1823	Originally a coaching inn, it is in millstone grit with hipped Welsh slate roofs. There are two storeys, a double depth plan, and a front of seven bays, the middle three bays projecting slightly. In the centre is a flat-roofed porch, and the windows are sashes. In the right return are three bays and a central porch, with square Tuscan Doric columns and moulded round arches with moulded imposts and keystones, and a dentilled cornice.
3–9 Ellison Street; 53.44448°N 1.94791°W		Early 19th century	A row of eight back-to-back houses, later four houses, in millstone grit with console-shaped corbels to the eaves and stone slate roofs. There are two storeys, and each house has two bays, a central doorway, and casement windows.
8 Henry Street; 53.44397°N 1.95029°W		Early 19th century	A shop in a row, in millstone grit with a Welsh slate roof. There are two storeys and a symmetrical front of two bays. The central doorway has pilasters with moulded capitals and bases, and a fanlight. It is flanked by shop windows with pilasters and a moulded entablature, and the upper floor contains sash windows.
10–18 Henry Street; 53.44398°N 1.94991°W		Early 19th century	A row of five shops, incorporating a Masonic hall, in millstone grit with a moulded cornice, a plain frieze, and Welsh slate roofs. There are two storeys and eleven bays. In the ground floor are shop fronts with varying surrounds, and the entrance to the Masonic hall. At each end is a cart entrance, the entrance on the right with channelled rustication and rusticated voussoirs. The upper floor contains sash windows.
8–14 High Street East; 53.44318°N 1.94840°W		Early 19th century	A row of houses, later shops, in millstone grit with stone slate roofs. There are two storeys, and in the upper floor are four sash windows and a casement window, all with wedge lintels. The ground floor contains four shop fronts with moulded pilasters and cornices, alternating with doorways with square-headed lintels.
25 High Street East and wall 53.44342°N 1.94730°W		Early 19th century	A house later used for other purposes, it is in millstone grit, rendered at the front, with a stone slate roof. There are two storeys and an attic, and two bays. The doorway and the windows, which are sashes, have flush surrounds. Attached on the left is a wall containing a doorway.
Former Bank House; 53.44396°N 1.94973°W		Early 19th century	A house with a banking hall added to the right, later used for other purposes, it is in millstone grit on a plinth, with rusticated quoins, a moulded cornice, dentilled on the right, and Welsh slate roofs. The original house to the left has two storeys and five bays. In the centre is a round-headed doorway with a moulded surround and a bracketed flat hood, flanked by shop windows, and in the upper floor are sash windows. The banking hall is taller with a hipped roof, two storeys, and a single-storey porch to the right. In the ground floor are three round-arched windows with moulded surrounds, and above is a tripartite sash window with pilasters. The porch contains a doorway flanked by square columns with capitals, a plain frieze, a moulded cornice, and an arcaded parapet.
Former Dollars public house 53.44263°N 1.95080°W		Early 19th century	The former public house is in millstone grit, with quoins, a moulded cornice, and a hipped slate roof. It is on a corner site and has three storeys, a front of three bays, and two bays on the right return. The central doorway has pilasters, a rectangular fanlight, and a flat hood. On the corner is a canted doorway with a moulded surround, pilasters, and a corbelled lintel. The windows are sashes.
Howard Town House; 53.44321°N 1.94675°W		Early 19th century	A house, later offices, in millstone grit, with a moulded eaves cornice, and a hipped stone slate roof. There are two storeys and four bays. The round-headed doorway has a moulded architrave, a semicircular fanlight, and a keystone. The windows are sashes, and at the rear is a tall round-headed staircase window.
Ryecroft; 53.44821°N 1.93804°W		Early 19th century	A house, sometime offices, in millstone grit, with quoins, a sill band, a moulded cornice, and a hipped Welsh slate roof. There are two storeys and a symmetrical front of three bays. In the centre is a round-arched doorway with pilasters, a fanlight, a keystone, and a moulded cornice, and the windows are sashes.
Former stables and living accommodation (now "The Barn"); 53.44883°N 1.93761°W		Early 19th century	The building, later converted for residential use, is in millstone grit with quoins, a stone slate roof on the main part, and a Welsh slate roof on the extension. There are two storeys, and a single-storey extension at right angles. The building contains doorways, taking-in doors, and windows, and in the left gable end is a coped pigeon loft with three rows of triangular openings.
Northern Glass Works, gates and railings 53.44662°N 1.93895°W		1836	Originally a Wesleyan chapel, later used as a Sunday School then for commercial purposes, it is in millstone grit with shaped corbels to the eaves and a slate roof. There is a single storey and three bays. The central doorway and the flanking windows have round heads, imposts and keystones, and the doorway has a fanlight. The low stone wall to the front of the building has iron railings and four gate piers, and to the side of the building is a wall with coping, and square-headed caps with chamfered corners.
Roman Catholic Church of All Saints; 53.45026°N 1.94376°W		1836	The church, designed by M. E. Hadfield and T. E Weightman in Neoclassical style, is in millstone grit with a Welsh slate roof. It consists of a nave and an apsidal sanctuary, with vestries over a basement at the rear. The entrance front is rusticated, and has four giant Tuscan Doric pilasters, a central doorway with a moulded surround, a fanlight, and a bracketed hood, flanked by casement windows. Above is a panel flanked by sash windows, and a pediment containing a circular window. On the opposite front is a bellcote with a round-arched openings, a bell, a bracketed cornice, and a cross finial.
Gates and walls, Roman Catholic Church of All Saints; 53.44981°N 1.94367°W	—	1836	At the entry to the churchyard is a cast iron gate, flanked by double cast iron gate piers, with pomegranate finials and spear headed railings. Outside these are square millstone grit piers with pyramidal caps, and curved coped walls similar outer piers.
Gates and boundary wall, Royle House; 53.44983°N 1.94413°W	—	1836	The wall is in millstone grit with semicircular coping, and it curves to join two stone gate piers. The wall contains a drinking trough set under a round-headed arch.
Gatepiers and gates, All Saints' Church, Old Glossop; 53.45011°N 1.93850°W		1837	At the entry to the churchyard are a pair of carriage gates, outside which are pedestrian gates in cast iron. These are flanked by four square limestone gate piers. Each pier is panelled, and has a moulded base and a shallow pyramidal cap.
Town Hall, Market Hall, railings and piers 53.44300°N 1.94976°W		1838	The town hall and the market hall, which was added in 1844–45, were designed by M. E. Hadfield and T. E Weightman, and are in millstone grit with slate roofs. The entrance on High street has two storeys, the ground floor with vermiculated rustication, and seven bays, the outer bays projecting, and the inner bays containing an arcade of five round arches with Tuscan Doric columns. Above are round-arched sash windows, and a bracketed cornice, and on the roof is a square clock tower with a circular cupola. Flanking this are four two-storey two-bay shops, and at the ends are taller shops with curved corners. Behind the arcade is a doorway with Tuscan Doric columns, and a parapet with a Vitruvian scroll motif. This leads to the market hall and the municipal buildings that have a south front of eleven bays. The surrounding area is enclosed by iron railings and boundary piers.
Wren Nest Mill, chimney and wall 53.44387°N 1.95840°W		c. 1840	A former cotton mill and integral engine house, later converted into flats. It is in millstone grit with a roof of stone slate and tile. There are five storeys, fronts of 22 and four bays, and a later single-storey extension on the front. Most of the windows have square-headed lintels, and there are two round-headed windows to the former engine house. Associated with the mill is a tall brick chimney stack, and a stretch of walling along the street.
St James' Church; 53.43874°N 1.95277°W		1844–46	A Commissioners' church designed by E. H. Shellard in Early English style, the chancel was enlarged in 1897, and the vestry added in about 1900. It is built in millstone grit with a Welsh slate roof, and consists of a nave, north and south aisles, a southwest porch and chapel, a chancel with southeast and southwest chapels and a vestry, and a northwest steeple. The steeple has a tower with four stages, angle buttresses, lancet windows and bell openings, corner pinnacles, and an octagonal spire with lucarnes. At the west end of the church is a triple-arched entrance with a hood mould, over which are eight lancet windows and a rose window. The porch has two storeys, a doorway with a pointed arch, and a frieze with trefoils.
Lychgate and wall, St James' Church; 53.43874°N 1.95277°W		1844	The wall is contemporary with the church, and the lychgate was added as a war memorial in about 1920. The wall enclosing the churchyard is coped, and has iron railings. The lychgate has low coped stone walls, a timber superstructure, and a stone slate gabled roof, with bargeboards and a cross finial. On the inner walls are war memorial tablets.
Glossop Gas Works; 53.44386°N 1.95373°W		1845	The building is in millstone grit, with vermiculated quoins, moulded cornice, and a Welsh slate roof. There are two storeys, a symmetrical front of five bays, and two bays on the sides. The central doorway has pilasters, a rectangular fanlight and a pediment, and the windows are tall and round-headed with vermiculated keystones. Between the floors is an inscribed band, and on the sides are pediments.
Railway station and former engine sheds 53.44423°N 1.94892°W		1847	The railway station, and the former engine sheds that have been converted for other uses, were designed by M. E. Hadfield and T. E Weightman. They are in millstone grit with rusticated vermiculated quoins, and roofs of Welsh slate and tile. There is a single storey, and four parallel ranges linked by a curtain wall. The former sheds to the left have pedimented coped gables. To the right the main station entrance has vermiculated rustication, a round-headed archway, and an entablature on which is a large carved lion. In the linking wall are two round-headed doorways, and the station has overhanging eaves and sash windows. Inside is a wooden decorated canopy on cast iron columns.
Duke of Norfolk's School and Schoolhouse; 53.45013°N 1.94007°W		Mid-19th century	The school, and the former schoolhouse to the east, are in millstone grit on a chamfered plinth with a sill band, and a Welsh slate roof with coped gables, kneelers, and ball finials. There is an E-shaped plan, the school has a single storey, and the house has two. The school has ten bays, and gabled cross-wings. The doorways have four-centred arched heads, and the windows are mullioned, and there is a mullioned and transomed window in the house.
Lodges, gates and walls, Wood's Mill; 53.44265°N 1.94906°W		Mid-19th century	The lodges flanking the entrance to the mill are in gritstone with sides in millstone grit, and Welsh slate roofs. They have rusticated fronts with a single storey, pilasters, a plain frieze and a pediment. Each lodge has a central doorway with an architrave and a cornice on brackets. The north lodge has sash windows on the front and side, and the south lodge has casement windows on the side. The four gate piers are rusticated and have pyramidal caps on scrolled brackets, and the gates are ornate and in cast iron. The walls are in millstone grit with buttresses at intervals.
Former Methodist church, Sunday school, walls and railings 53.44450°N 1.95507°W		1855	The former church, and the Sunday school at right angles, are in millstone grit with Welsh slate roofs, and both with two storeys. The entrance front to the church has a coped pediment containing a quatrefoil, a central round-headed doorway with a moulded surround, and a Venetian window above. The windows in the ground floor have flat heads, in the upper floor they have round heads, and along the sides are two tiers with five windows in each floor. The Sunday school has a gabled front with a quatrefoil, and contains a central round-arched doorway, a Venetian window above, flanking tall round-headed windows, and a smaller round-headed doorway on the left. In front of the church entrance are coped walls, square gate piers with moulded pyramidal caps, and cast iron gates with fleur-de-lys finials, and in front of the Sunday school are cast iron railings and a gate.
Premises occupied by Helme Footwear (now "The Coppice"); 53.44646°N 1.93891°W		1860	A former chapel, later used for commercial then residential purposes, it is in millstone grit, with rusticated quoins, a sill band, a corbel band, and a slate roof with coped gables and a finial. There are two storeys, a symmetrical front of three bays, and four bays on the left side. All the openings on the front have round heads and panelled surrounds. The doorways in the outer bays have fanlights, and the upper floor windows have aprons. In the gable is a small semicircular opening over a dated plaque.
Wood Monument; 53.43849°N 1.95310°W		1869	The monument in the churchyard of St James' Church is to the memory of Samuel Wood. It is in stone and has a square base with a panel, over which is a string course, and an octagon with pierced panels, and a squat spire with an Iona cross. Attached is an enclosed rectangular grave with a stone cross, and low chamfered walling with an iron rails.
The Oakwood; 53.44330°N 1.95262°W		c. 1870	A public house and restaurant on a corner site in millstone grit, with a sill band, bracketed and moulded eaves, and a Welsh slate Mansard roof. There are two storeys and an attic, four bays on High Street, and nine on George Street. The ground floor contains shop fronts with pilasters and columns, and windows with moulded round arches, over which is a fascia board. In the corner is a canted doorway with a fanlight, over which is a canted bay window, and an octagonal spire with a lead cap. In the centre of the Grove Street front is a doorway with a pointed arch, pilasters, and a gabled hood on brackets, with a carved shield and two marble roundels. Over this is a window with a balcony under a reliving arch, and a gable with an ornate iron finial. The windows in the upper floor are paired sashes with moulded pointed arches and columns, and in the attic are segment-headed dormers with moulded surrounds.
Holy Trinity Church, Dinting; 53.44571°N 1.96961°W		1873–75	The church, which was extended in 1931, is in gritstone with a Welsh slate roof, and is in Early English style. It consists of a nave with a clerestory, north and south aisles, a chancel with an apse, vestry and choir vestry, and a southwest steeple. The steeple has an entrance tower with three stages, angle buttresses rising to gabled pinnacles, embattled parapets, and an octagonal spire with a weathervane.
Drinking trough 53.44336°N 1.94912°W		1881	The former drinking trough is in millstone grit on a double chamfered plinth, and on the north side is a red granite trough with rolled edges on shaped granite legs. Above, is a chamfered and coped gable with gabled kneelers and a stepped carved finial, containing a moulded and pointed arch with a hood mould. In the apex of the gable is a heraldic shield, and on the north side is an inscription and the date.
Former Littlemoor Church, railings and gate piers 53.44123°N 1.95043°W		1881	The church and Sunday school, which have been converted for other uses, are in millstone grit with polychromatic stone dressings and Welsh slate roofs, and have two storeys. The church has four bays facing the street, with a porch and a tower in the right bay. The porch is gabled and has a doorway with a pointed arch. The tower is square and tall, and has a pyramidal roof with a ball finial. In the left return, the church has one bay, and the Sunday school has five, and they contain windows with pointed polychromatic arches. At the front of the church is a low wall with chamfered coping, and ornate cast iron railings. The gateway has square gate piers with chamfered corners and pyramidal caps, and ornate cast iron gates.
Church of St Mary Crowned; 53.44157°N 1.95595°W		1882–87	The church is in millstone grit with a Welsh slate roof. It consists of a nave with a clerestory, north and south aisles, a west baptistry, a southwest gabled porch, and at the east end is a polygonal apse with a pierced parapet. On the southeast corner of the nave is a bell turret.
Victoria Hall and Public Library; 53.44656°N 1.95002°W		1887–88	The concert hall and library are in millstone grit on a chamfered plinth, with chamfered sill bands, and Welsh slate roofs with coped gables and kneelers. There are two storeys and a cruciform plan, the main range containing the library in the ground floor with the hall above, the entrances in the wings, and a bell tower in an angle. At the north end is a polygonal apse with a balustraded parapet and ball finials, and a central pedimented gable with an inscribed escutcheon and ball finial. The tower has an entrance with a moulded surround, a fanlight, and a four-centred arch. Above are two windows and an inscribed plaque, bell openings with pointed arches, a quatrefoil parapet, corner pinnacles with ball finials, and a spire with lucarnes and a finial.
National Westminster Bank; 53.44355°N 1.94948°W		1897	The bank is in millstone grit on a chamfered plinth, with a panel frieze, bands, and a Westmorland slate roof with terracotta ridge tiles. There are three bays, the left bay with three storeys, a shaped gable, a lion finial and a datestone, and the others have two storeys and a stepped parapet. In the ground floor of the left bay are a doorway and window with round-arched heads and mullioned fanlights, above which is a canted oriel window on a corbelled base, and a five-light window in the top floor. The other bays have segment-headed windows in the ground floor, and three-light windows above. All the windows are mullioned and transomed.
Laneside Farm; 53.45445°N 1.94376°W		c. 1899	A model farm, the buildings in blue brick, with dressings in red brick and stone, and tile roofs with overhanging eaves. The farm buildings are arranged around three sides of a courtyard, the farmhouse and dairy are on the east, and there is a four-stage square tower with a pyramidal roof and a weathervane is at the northeast. The other buildings include a shippon, a cart shed, pig sties, and a horse gin. The farmhouse has an L-shaped plan with a porch in the angle, and the dairy has an open verandah.
Adult Education Centre; 53.44621°N 1.95019°W		1899–1901	Originally a technical school, the centre is in stone on a moulded plinth, with quoins, a floor band, an eaves cornice, and a Westmorland slate roof with coped gables and ball finials. There are two storeys over a deep basement, a central range of five bays, flanked by projecting three-bay gabled wings. Steps with railings lead up to the central round-headed doorway that has pilasters, a fanlight, and a keystone. The windows are sashes with moulded surrounds, those in the upper floor of the wings with round heads.
Conservative Club; 53.44398°N 1.94846°W		1909	The club building is in millstone grit on a plinth, with a moulded floor band, and a Welsh slate roof with coped gables and kneelers. There are three storeys and a basement, and a front of three irregular bays with a shaped gable and ball finials. The front has two segmental-headed basement windows, to the left is a doorway with a moulded surround, a round-arched fanlight and a keystone, and to the right are three-light mullioned windows with a cartouche between. In the left corner of the middle floor is a balcony with a column, an open balustrade and shouldered arches, to the right are three mullioned windows, and above is an inscribed frieze. The top floor contains mullioned windows, above which is a dated shield. The left return has six irregular bays, and contains various windows, one circular, and a stair tower.
Partington Theatre; 53.44374°N 1.94944°W		1914	Originally the Liberal Club, it was converted into a theatre in 1957. It is in stone with brick at the rear, and has moulded bands, a cornice, an arcaded parapet, and a stone slate roof. There are three storeys and a basement, a front of four bays, and seven bays along the right return. The front contains a doorway to the left, over which is a balcony on console brackets, with a parapet. The windows are mullioned and transomed, and in the top floor is a niche containing a statue.
War memorial 53.44375°N 1.94993°W		c. 1920	The war memorial has a square stone base of five steps, and a rectangular plinth, on which is a bronze statue by Vernon March depicting a winged Victory. On the sides of the plinth are bronze laurel wreaths, and on the front is an inscription and brass plates with the names of those lost in the two World Wars.
Pair of telephone kiosks 53.44342°N 1.94958°W		1935	The telephone kiosks are of the K6 type designed by Giles Gilbert Scott. They are constructed in cast iron with a square plan and a dome, and have three unperforated crowns in the top panels.
