= Norfolk Square, Glossop =

Town square in Glossop, England

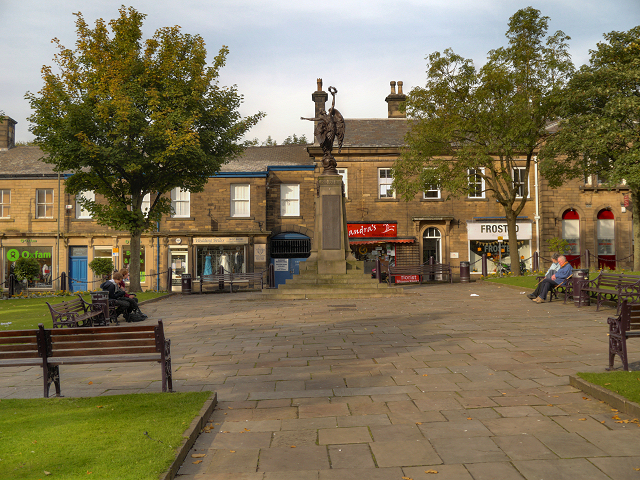
War memorial in the centre of Norfolk Square

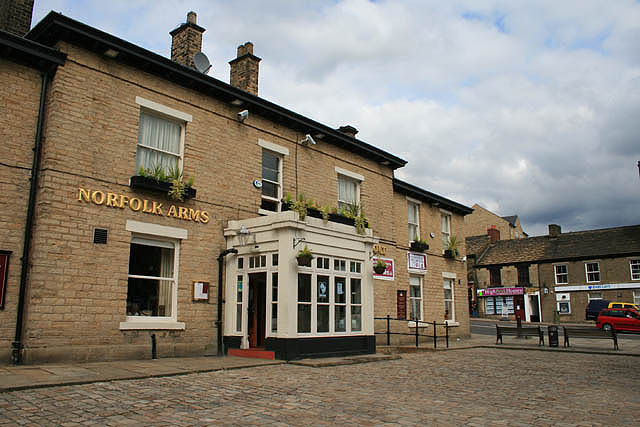
Norfolk Arms pub

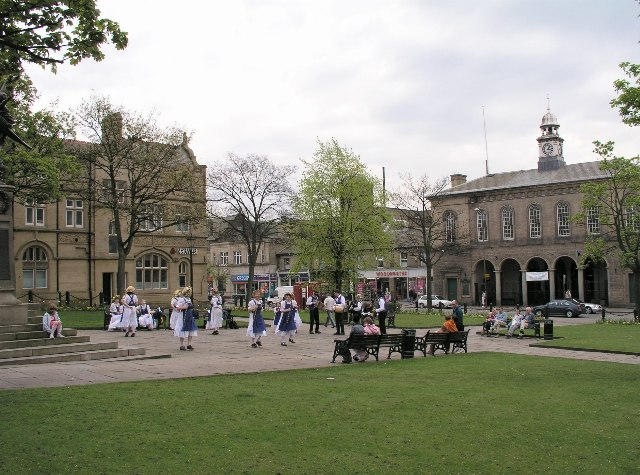
View of square with Glossop Town Hall on right

Norfolk Square is in the centre of Glossop in Derbyshire, England, a former mill town close to the Peak District. It forms part of the town centre, adjacent to the crossroads where the A57 road meets the A624. Glossop railway station, opened in 1845, is just to the north of the square. It is at the centre of modern Glossop, with many of the buildings dating from the 19th century, as the heart of the town shifted westwards from Old Glossop during the Industrial Revolution. It forms the focus of the town's commercial area with numerous shops, restaurants and pubs in the streets leading off it.

It takes its name from the Dukes of Norfolk, a major landowning family in the area who constructed many of the buildings in the square, which was once known as Norfolk Gardens. Glossop Market and Glossop Town Hall are on the southern side, dating from 1838. Many of the square's buildings are listed as Grade II among the numerous listed buildings in the town. The Norfolk Arms public house, dating from 1823, stands by the crossroads. The northern side of the square features the 1914 Partington Theatre. The middle of the square is a pedestrianised garden featuring an 1881 drinking fountain and a war memorial commemorating the dead of the First World War. In the early twentieth century it was connected to the Glossop Tramway before its closure in 1927.

== Bibliography ==
- Buxton, Margaret (2009). Derbyshire Through Time. Amberley Publishing Limited. ISBN 1848685173.
- Cooper, Glynis (2015). Glossop in the Great War. Pen and Sword. ISBN 1473821711.
- Moat, Helen (2016). Slow Travel The Peak District. Bradt Travel Guides. ISBN 1784774243.
- Pevsner, Nikolaus; Williamson, Elizabeth (1978). Derbyshire. Buildings of England. Yale University Press.
