= Glossop Gas Works =

Building in Glossop, Derbyshire, England

Coordinates: 53°26′38″N 1°57′14″W

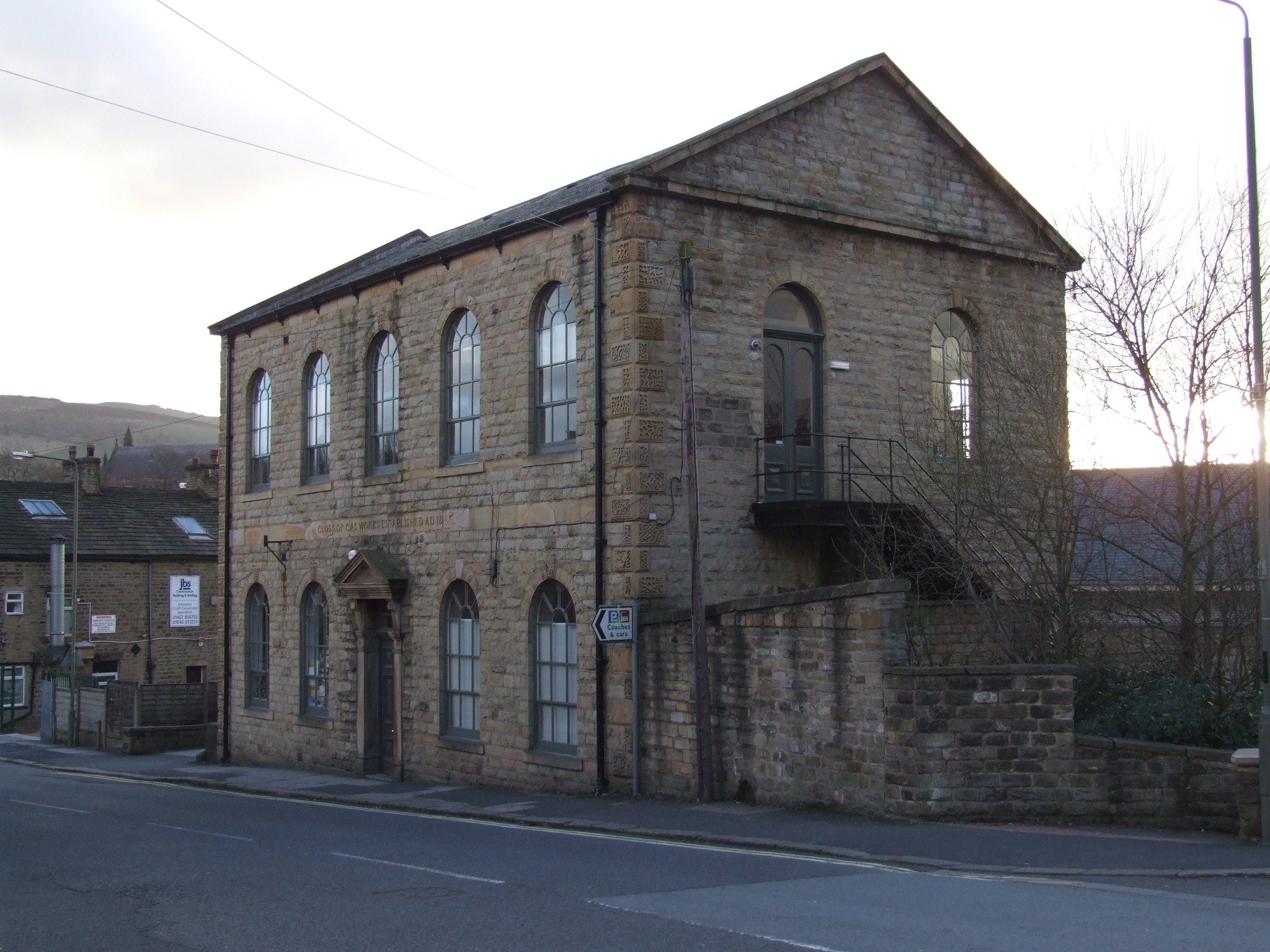
View from Arundel Street

Glossop Gas Works is a historic building in Glossop, England. It was constructed in the late 19th century on Arundel Street, Glossop, as the headquarters of the town's gas company.

== 2005 to present day ==
In 2005 the building, now a Grade II listed building, was bought by two brothers Duncan and David Wright with a view to bringing the building, which at the time was largely unused, back into use. At the time Glossop Gasworks housed a tool hire company run by Northern Tool Hire, and Wains Services, an art supply and stationery shop.

The renovations included the addition of a third floor in the existing roof space, and of roof lights to the rear, but the building's facade was preserved, leaving its front elevation unaltered. In 2006, Glossop Gasworks opened as a serviced office facility, and became home to a number of businesses. Northern Tool Hire moved out in 2006. Wain Services continued to operate from the building until closing its doors on 31 July 2021 having traded in the town since 1971.

In 2015 the top floor was converted to accommodate the Glossop Gasworks Business Hub, a co-working and shared workspace. Following the closure of Wains Services, In October 2021 the vacated ground floor space was taken over by KIN.DER, a local Creative Collective focused on Textile Design & Photography. At this point, the space also become the home of Glossop Creates, one of the initiatives developed by the Glossop Creative Trust CIC to support and develop the creative scene within the town.

== See also ==
- Listed buildings in Glossop
