= All Saints' Church, Glossop =

All Saints’ Church, Glossop
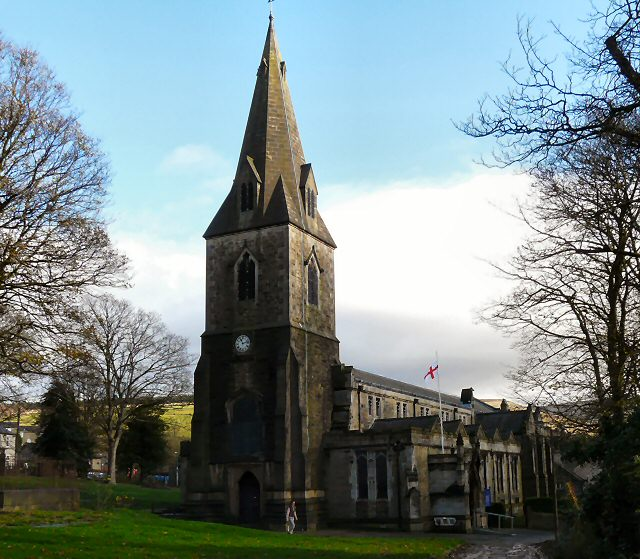
- All Saints’ Church, Glossop
- All Saints’ Church, Glossop
- 53°27′0.45″N 1°56′20.86″W
- OS grid reference: SK 04151 94830
- Location: Glossop, Derbyshire
- Country: England
- Denomination: Church of England
- Website: glossopparishchurch.btck.co.uk

History
- Dedication: All Saints

Architecture
- Heritage designation: Grade II listed
- Designated: 4 December 1958

Specifications
- Length: 117 feet (36 m)

Administration
- Province: Canterbury
- Diocese: Derby
- Archdeaconry: Chesterfield
- Deanery: Glossop
- Parish: Glossop

All Saints’ Church, Glossop, is a Grade II listed parish church in the Church of England in Glossop, Derbyshire, England.

== History ==
The first mention of a church in Glossop is in the charter of 1157 conferring the manor of Glossop on Basingwerk Abbey. Although the dedication of the church to All Saints may indicate an Anglo-Saxon origin, no trace of such a church has been found. The first recorded vicar is William, of 1252. At this time the church was probably aisleless. When the taxation roll of Pope Nicholas IV was drawn up in 1291, the rectory of Glossop was valued at £34 13s. 4d. (equivalent to £34,421 in 2025).

It was altered in the 15th century when the nave was rebuilt with arcades, aisles and an arch at the east end of the north aisle. At the time of the dissolution of the monasteries, the Valor Ecclesiasticus gives the value of the vicarage as £12 18s. 9d. (equivalent to £9,237 in 2025).

In 1554 a new and taller tower with a broach spire was built 3 feet west of the old tower, incorporating the east wall of the previous tower. The nave was completely rebuilt in 1831, with removal and replacement of much of the old fabric including the tracery of the aisle windows. The work was carried out by the firm of E. W. Drury of Sheffield, the cost far exceeding the initial estimate of £700 (equivalent to £62,787 in 2025). The architects were Matthew Ellison Hadfield and John Grey Weightman.

When the nave was rebuilt in 1914 it was discovered that the arch leading to the chancel had been partly made up of plaster, the wall supported by this arch had not been bonded into the existing chancel walls, and the "oak" roof bosses were also plaster. Between the pillars of the nave sleeper walls had been built to a higher level than the pillar bases. These walls appear to have been needed to counteract the effects on the church structure of a combination of excess drainage from the nearby hillside and the numerous burials inside the church. The pillars of the new nave of 1914 were superimposed on the bases of the old pillars, and the floor built up to cover the sleeper walls.

The tower and chancel were demolished and rebuilt in 1853–55, the new tower also having a broach spire. It was paid for by the Duke of Norfolk.

The chancel was again rebuilt in 1923, completing the architect C. M. Hadfield's plan of 1914. It was the gift of churchwarden Harriet Jackson in memory of her husband Isaac, a local industrialist and great benefactor to the town. The present church has a nave of 5 bays, 25 yards long by 16 yards wide, with north and south aisles, and a chancel of 14 yards by 7 yards with a north aisle dedicated as St Catherine's Chapel.

== Organ ==
An organ was installed in 1871 by Brindley & Foster. This was replaced in 1984 by an organ from the Unitarian Church in Glossop which was originally from 1910 by Norman and Beard. A specification of the organ can be found on the National Pipe Organ Register.

== Clock ==
The clock had no face until 1740 with its bell being the timekeeper for the town. The present clock dates from 1883 and was made by William McFerran of Manchester. It was the gift of Samuel Wood, a Glossop cotton mill owner. Unusually for a church clock, it only has one face which is on the west side of the tower. It is still driven by its original weight and pulley mechanisms.

== Bells ==
There was originally a separate bell-house in the churchyard which was a low building surrounded by railings but in 1709 the medieval bells were replaced by six bells described as "very deep in tone" which were bought from Woodford in Cheshire and installed in the tower. These bells were recast by James Harrison of Barton-upon-Humber in 1816. In 1854 two additional treble bells were added when the tower was rebuilt. The ring was rehung in 1880 and the whole ring was recast in 1923 by Gillett & Johnston. A major refurbishment was completed in 2018 with the replacement of the clock room floor and the rehanging of the bells and replacement of most of the running gear.

== See also ==
- Listed buildings in Glossop
