= Urban Electric Supply Company =

1898–1948 British electric holding company

Urban Electric Supply Company Limited
- Company type: Public limited company
- Industry: Energy, Electricity supply
- Founded: 1898
- Defunct: 31 March 1948
- Fate: Abolished by nationalisation
- Successor: British Electricity Authority, area electricity boards
- Headquarters: London
- Area served: Great Britain
- Key people: see text
- Services: Electricity generation and supply
- Net income: see table
- Owner: Edmundsons Electricity Corporation
- Subsidiaries: Cornwall Electric Power Company Limited, East Anglian Electric Supply Company Limited

The Urban Electric Supply Company Limited (UESCo) was a British electricity industry holding company that operated from 1898 until the nationalisation of the electricity supply industry in 1948. It controlled directly, or indirectly through its subsidiaries, electricity undertakings throughout Britain.

== History ==
The company was founded in 1898 for the purpose of obtaining parliamentary powers to operate electric light and tramway undertakings in England, Wales and Scotland. By 1901 powers had been obtained to construct electricity systems in the following towns, given together with the projected cost of these works:

Urban Electric Supply Company 1901, cost of works
Town	Works cost £	Town	Works cost £
Camborne and Redruth	35,000	Bishop Auckland	15,000
Glossop	27,000	Godalming	14,000
Twickenham	26,000	Newton Abbot	15,000
Hawick	16,000	Stamford	15,000
Grantham	17,000	Dartmouth	15,000
Berwick-on-Tweed	14,000	Weybridge	16,000

In addition to electric light supplies there were two electric tramways being developed: Camborne and Redruth (£40,000) and Glossop (£50,000). The construction of all these systems was undertaken by Edmundsons Electricity Corporation.

The Urban Electric Company raised capital in June 1901 by issuing £500,000 of shares. Further capital was raised by the subsequent issue of shares: £650,000 in July 1905; £640,000 in June 1923; and £250,000 of £1 ordinary shares in 1930.

In 1905 Bishop Auckland was no longer controlled by the company but the Caterham and Newbury undertakings had been added to the Urban Electric Supply Company's portfolio.

In 1923 the company controlled the following undertakings, these were generally small scale, the installed generating capacity, electricity sold and operating surplus was:

Urban Electric Supply Company, 1923, electricity generation, sales and operating surplus
Undertaking	Generating plant kW	Electricity sold MWh	Surplus revenue over expenses £
Berwick-upon-Tweed	470	423	5,085
Camborne	?	105	1,518
Caterham	180	216	5,018
Dartmouth and Kingswear	330	278	3,922 + 561
Glossop	425	702	6,964
Godalming	600	352	7,019
Grantham	670	532	8,125
Illogan	–	32	-68
Newbury	672	546	6,556
Newton Abbot	520	526	7,192
Redruth	–	164	1,029
Stamford	580	366	4,909
Walton and Weybridge	–	981	9,142 + 6,119

In 1930 the capital raised by the issue of shares was used to acquire control of the following electricity undertakings:

- Bodmin Electric Light and Supply Company Limited
- East Cornwall Electricity Supply Company Limited
- Looe Electricity Company Limited
- North Cornwall Ice and Cold Storage Company Limited (Padstow)
- Wadebridge and District Electric Supply Company Limited
- Liskeard Gas and Electricity Company Limited
- Launceston and District Electric Supply Company Limited

=== Subsidiary companies ===
==== Cornwall Electric Power Company ====
Cornwall Electric Power Act 1902
- Act of Parliament
- Parliament of the United Kingdom
- Long title: An Act for incorporating and conferring powers on the Cornwall Electric Power Company.
- Citation: 2 Edw. 7. c. xxxiv

Dates
- Royal assent: 28 April 1902

Cornwall Electric Power Act 1936
- Act of Parliament
- Parliament of the United Kingdom
- Long title: An Act to confer further powers on the Cornwall Electric Power Company and for other purposes.
- Citation: 26 Geo. 5 & 1 Edw. 8. c. liv

Dates
- Royal assent: 14 July 1936

Text of statute as originally enacted

Cornwall Electric Power Act 1940
- Act of Parliament
- Parliament of the United Kingdom
- Long title: An Act to confer further powers on the Cornwall Electric Power Company and for other purposes.
- Citation: 3 & 4 Geo. 6. c. xxi

Dates
- Royal assent: 13 June 1940

Text of statute as originally enacted

The Cornwall Electric Power Company Limited was a subsidiary company, which operated power stations at Hayle (8.80 MW in 1923, 32.5 MW in 1939) and Carn Brea (900 kW in 1923).

In 1931 the world price of tin suffered a serious fall. This had an impact on the Cornwall Electric Company which was dependent on tin mines for the bulk of its income. There was a drop of 4 GWh in electricity supply, which reduced the income from £9,250 to £7,500.

==== East Anglian Electric Supply Company ====
In 1934 the Urban Electric Supply Company acquired another subsidiary, the East Anglian Electric Supply Company Limited. The area supplied by the East Anglian company had an additional 134 miles of high voltage and 80 miles of low voltage distribution mains.

=== Post-war operations ===
By 1946 the only generating station operated by the Urban Electric Supply Company was the Hawick undertaking, with an output of 1,888 MWh. The Cornwall Electric Power Company Limited operated Hayle power station, output 142,868 MWh; and the East Anglian Electric Supply Company operated power stations at Cromer, output 62.9 MWh; and Southwold, output 392 kWh.

=== Nationalisation ===
The Urban Electric Supply Company was abolished on 31 March 1948 under the terms of the Electricity Act 1947 which nationalised the British electricity supply industry. The company's power stations and electricity transmission systems were vested in the British Electricity Authority. The local distribution systems and the electricity supply functions were vested in the various geographical electricity boards.

== Financial ==
The net profit from the company's operations was:

Urban Electric Supply Company profits 1902–34
Year	Net profit £	Year	Net profit £
1902	1,871	1918	59,920
1903	12,181	1919	55,604
1904	19,234	1920	86,685
1905	26,000	1921	95,562
1911	47,649	1922	122,006
1912	54,264	1930	154,273
1913	61,684	1931	151,819
1914	65,666	1932	105,693
1915	65,311	1933	106,005
1916	61,772	1934	104,333
1917	64,521		

== Key people ==
The board of directors in 1901 was:

- Francis Edward Gripper (Chairman)
- Edmund Charrington
- Herbert Brent Grotrian
- William Page
- John Cuthbert Wigham

Subsequent chairmen were:

- Edmund Charrington, 1905
- Philip Debell Tuckett, 1921–1933
- Sir Holberry Mensforth, 1935 (b. 1871, d. 1951)
- Wade Hampton Hayes, 1940 (b. 1879, d. 1956)

== See also ==
- Timeline of the UK electricity supply industry
- Electric Supply Corporation Limited
