= Glossop War Memorial =

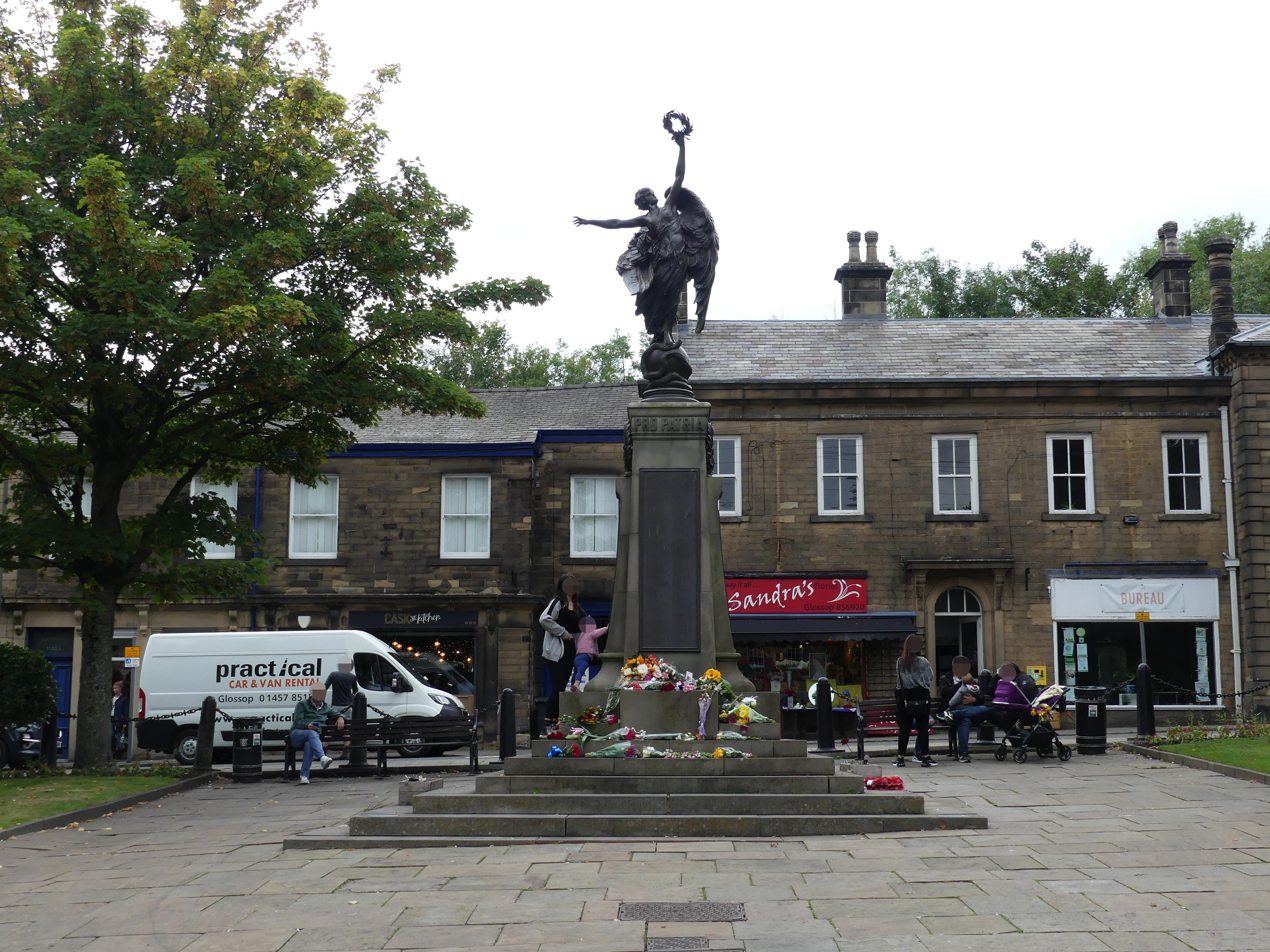
- Glossop War Memorial

- Location in Derbyshire
- 53°26′37″N 1°57′00″W
- Location: Glossop, Derbyshire, England

Listed Building – Grade II
- Official name: War Memorial
- Designated: 22 May 2000
- Reference no.: 1384285

Glossop War Memorial is a 20th-century grade II listed war memorial in Norfolk Square in Glossop, Derbyshire.

== History ==
The war memorial was unveiled on 26 March 1922. It features the names of local residents who died during the First and Second World Wars.

The memorial has been Grade II listed since 22 May 2000.

== See also ==
- Listed buildings in Glossop
