= Howard Town Brewery =

English microbrewery

Howard Town is a microbrewery established in 2005 in Glossop, Derbyshire, England. It distributes cask ale to pubs throughout Northern England.

== Brewery ==
The brewery was established in the former Bridge End Fulling Mill with brewing kit from the Porter Brewing Co Ltd. In 2006, the mill caught fire and brewing was suspended until new premises were found at Hawkshead Mill in Old Glossop.

== Beers ==
As well as the regular beers below, the brewery also produces occasional one-offs.

Mill Town (abv 3.5%)

Longdendale lights (3.9%) - named for the famous mystery lights of the region

Monk's Gold (abv 4%)

Wren's Nest (abv 4.2%)

- Gold, Best Bitter category Sheffield Beer Festival September 2006
- Silver, Beer of Festival Sheffield Beer Festival September 2006
- Gold, Best Bitter category SIBA Midlands Beer Competition 2006
- Supreme Champion SIBA Midlands Beer Competition 2006
- Gold, Best Bitter category SIBA National Beer Competition 2007
- Supreme Champion SIBA National Beer Competition 2007

Superfortress (abv 4.4%)

Dark Peak (abv 6.0%)
