= Old Glossop =

Historic centre of Glossop, England

Coordinates: 53.44°N 1.95°W

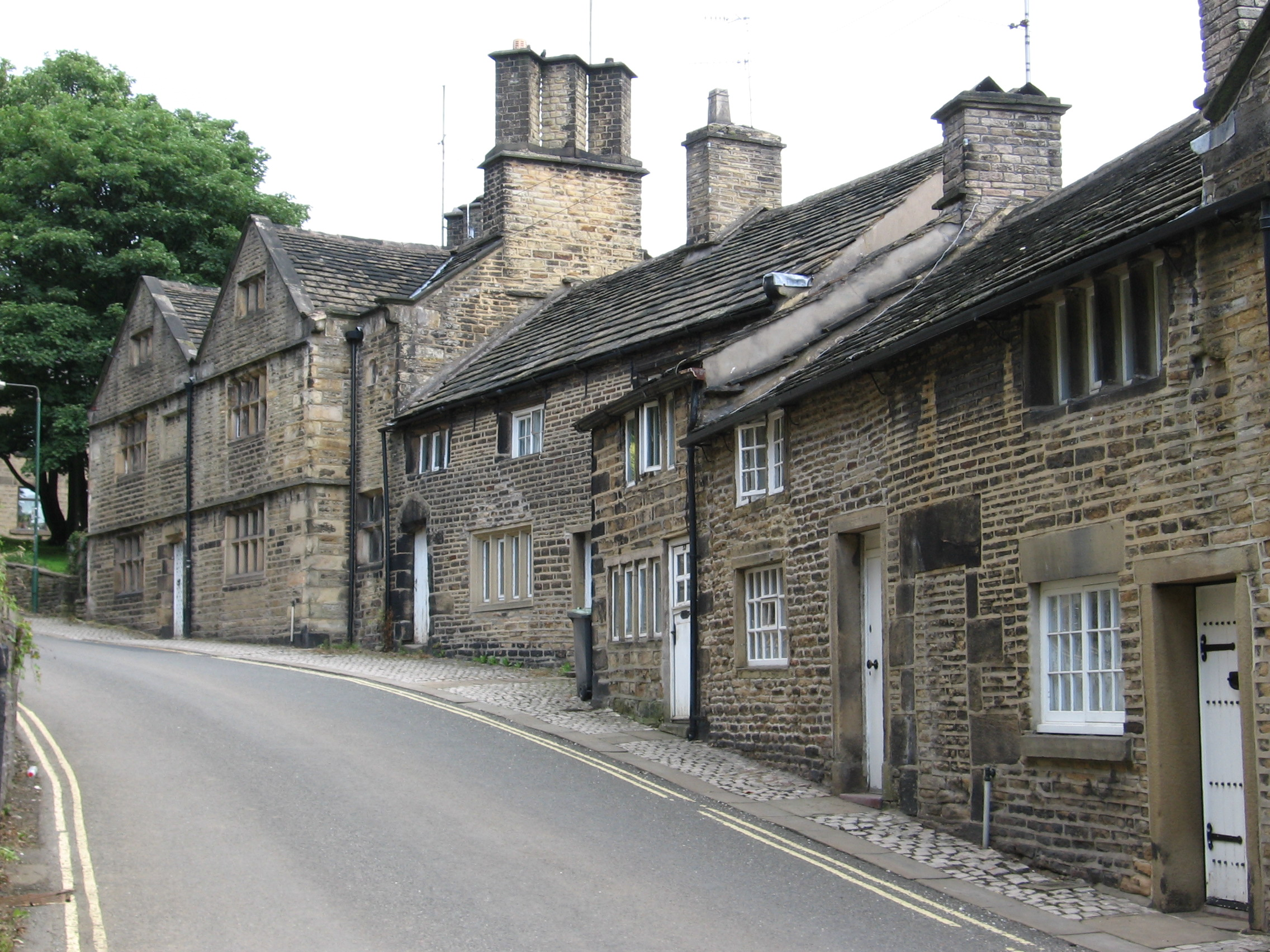

- Location within Derbyshire
- OS grid reference: SK0393
- District: High Peak
- Shire county: Derbyshire
- Region: East Midlands
- Country: England
- Sovereign state: United Kingdom
- Post town: GLOSSOP
- Postcode district: SK13
- Dialling code: 01457
- Police: Derbyshire
- Fire: Derbyshire
- Ambulance: North West
- UK Parliament: High Peak

Old Glossop is a village and the original part of the town of Glossop in the High Peak area of Derbyshire, England, about 15 miles (24 km) east of Manchester and 23 miles (37 km) west of Sheffield. The village is on the very edge of the Peak District national park. The town centre was originally this village, but it migrated to the west with the Industrial Revolution and the building of a planned mill town (originally called Howard Town or New Glossop) and the railway from Manchester to Sheffield and its branch to Glossop railway station just north of Norfolk Square.

Although High Peak Borough Council has now called a large area of Glossop "Old Glossop" for political ward reasons, the original parish boundaries cover an area with a population of about 1,100.

At the beginning of the 1900s the village had eight pubs, but there are now only three: the Bull's Head, the Wheatsheaf and the Queen's Arms Hotel. In addition, a microbrewery, Howard Town Brewery, is located in Old Glossop.

In 2013, Old Glossop was used for filming in the BBC drama series The Village, starring John Simm and Maxine Peake. The parish church of All Saints and the former Duke of Norfolk school building appeared in the series.

== See also ==
- Listed buildings in Glossop
