= Sleeper wall =

A sleeper wall may refer to the following types of walls:

sleeper wall
a short wall used to support floor joists, beam and block or hollowcore slabs at ground floor. It is constructed in this fashion when a suspended floor (also called suspended slab) is required due to bearing conditions or ground water presence. Essentially, it is a wall in the way that it is constructed, but a sleeper in the way that it functions. Stretcher bond or header-stretcher bond can be used in these walls.
railway sleeper wall
a retaining wall made from railway sleepers. It is used to prevent erosion. It can be made from bricks or concrete blocks. The wall is often used in landscaping.
