= Lintel =

Structural horizontal block that spans the space between two vertical supports

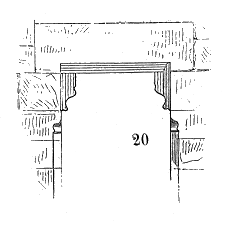
Structural lintel

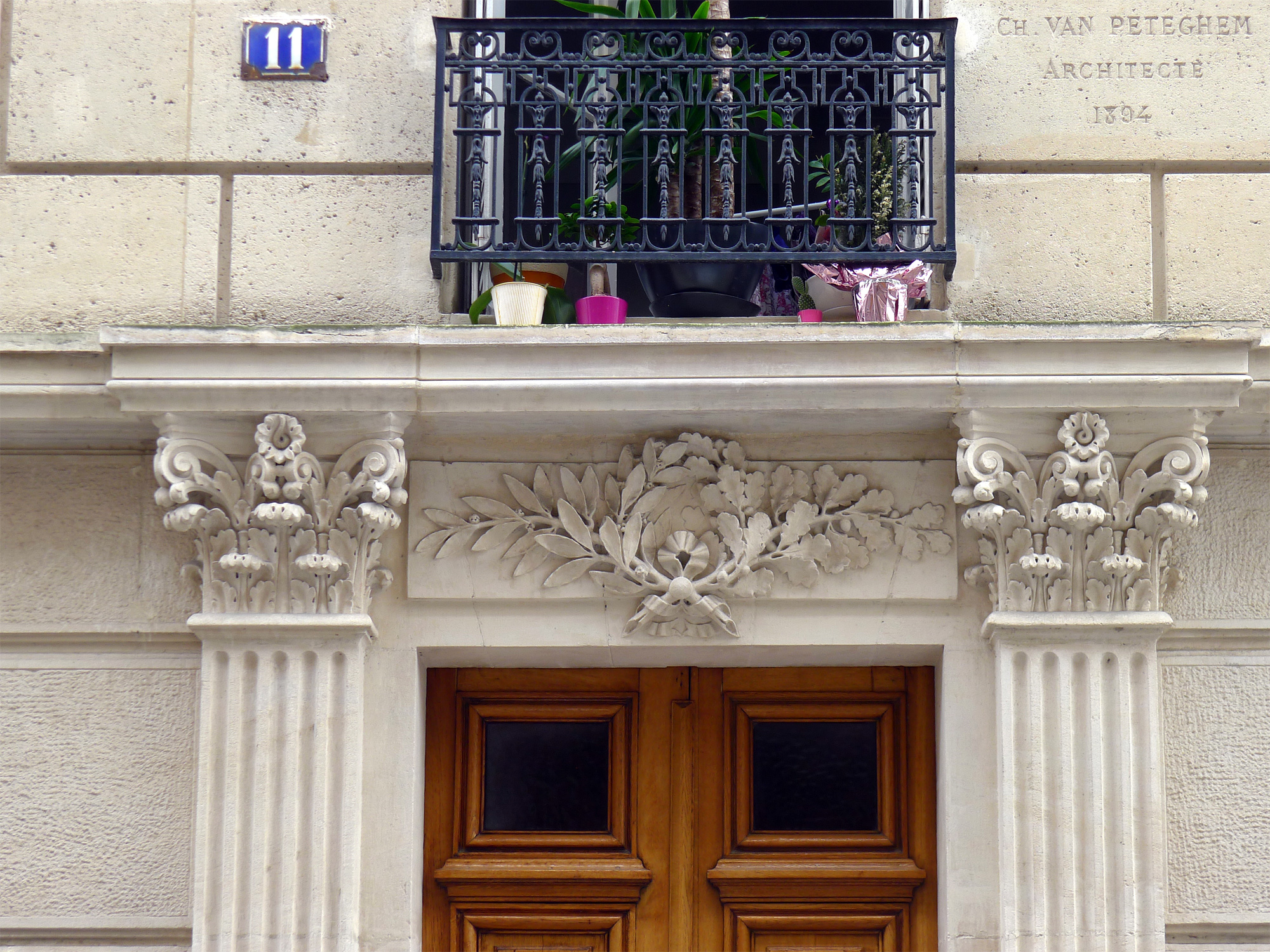
Lintel above a door in Paris

A lintel or lintol is a type of beam (a horizontal structural element) that spans openings such as portals, doors, windows and fireplaces. It can be a decorative architectural element, or a combined ornamented/structural item. In the case of windows, the bottom span is referred to as a sill, but, unlike a lintel, does not serve to bear a load to ensure the integrity of the wall. Modern-day lintels may be made using prestressed concrete and are also referred to as beams in beam-and-block slabs or as ribs in rib-and-block slabs. These prestressed concrete lintels and blocks can serve as components that are packed together and propped to form a suspended-floor concrete slab.

An arch functions as a curved lintel.

== Structural uses ==
In worldwide architecture of different eras and many cultures, a lintel has been an element of post and lintel construction. Many different building materials have been used for lintels.

In classical Western architecture and construction methods, by Merriam-Webster definition, a lintel is a load-bearing member and is placed over an entranceway. The lintel may be called an architrave, but that term has alternative meanings that include more structure besides the lintel. The lintel is a structural element that is usually rested on stone pillars or stacked stone columns, over a portal or entranceway.

A lintel may support the chimney above a fireplace, or span the distance of a path or road, forming a stone lintel bridge.

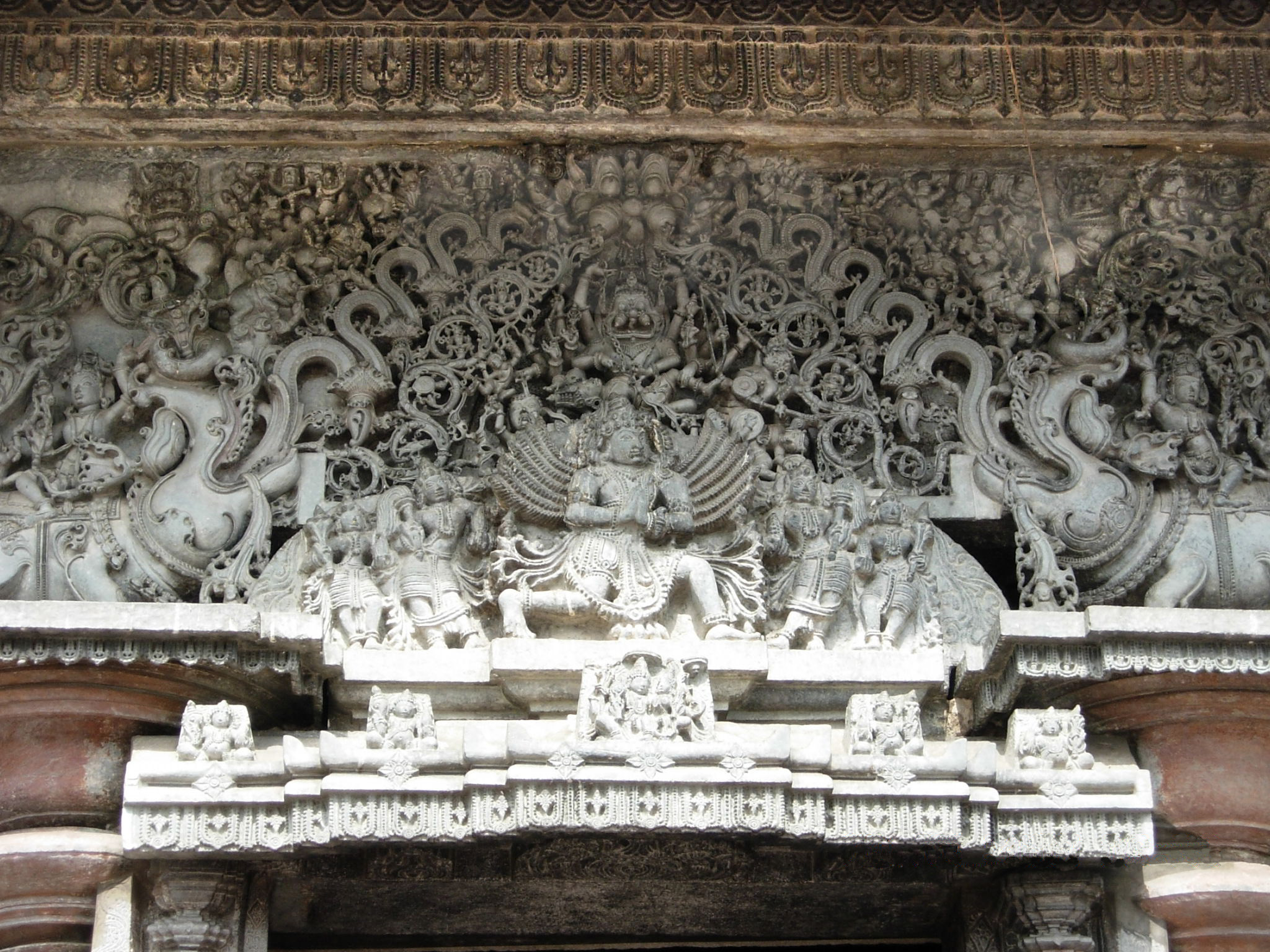
Ornamental carved lintel over Mandapa entrance at Chennakesava Temple, in the Hoysala architecture tradition of southern India

== Ornamental uses ==
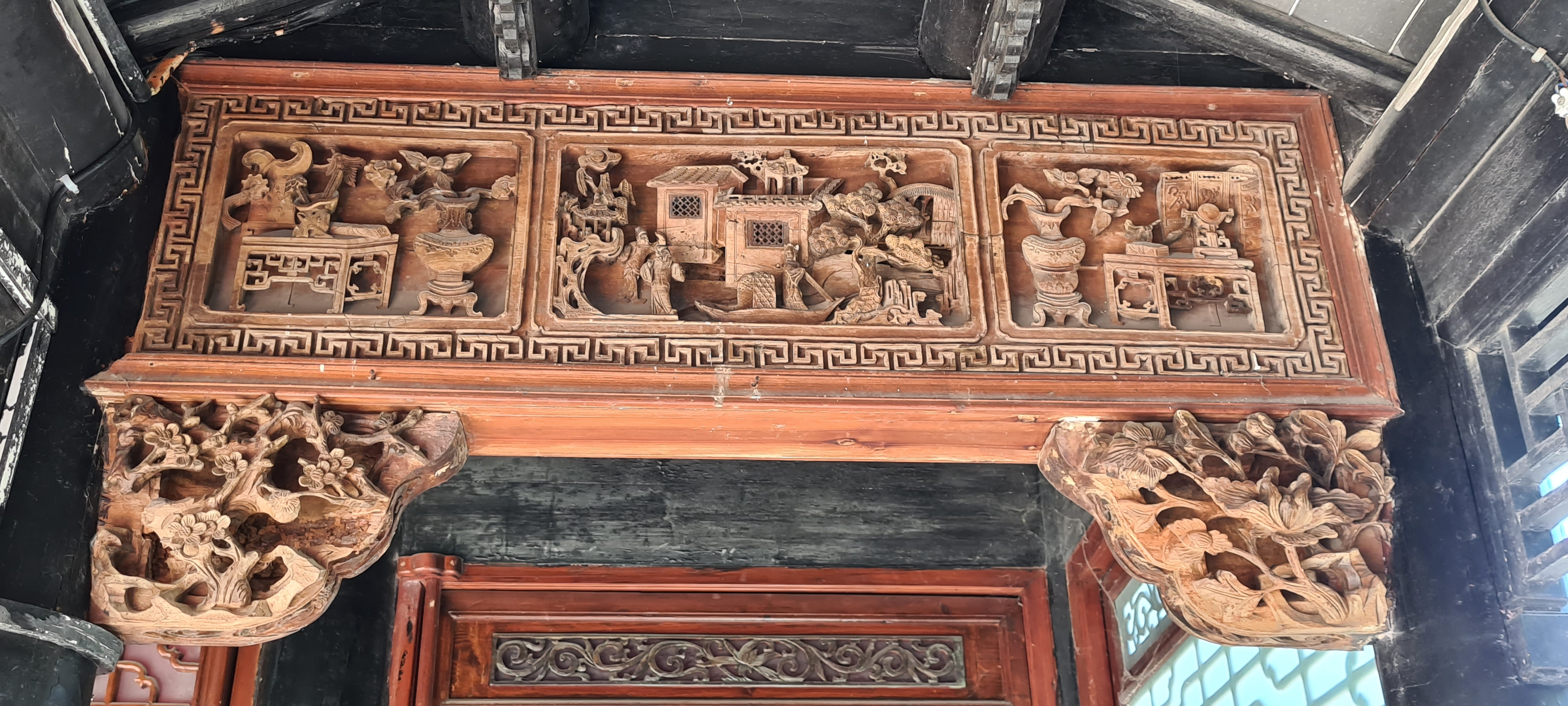
Ornamental Chinese lintel at Zhan Yuan.

The use of the lintel form as a decorative building element over portals, with no structural function, has been employed in the architectural traditions and styles of most cultures over the centuries.

Examples of the ornamental use of lintels are in the hypostyle halls and slab stelas in ancient Egypt and the Indian rock-cut architecture of Buddhist temples in caves. Preceding prehistoric and subsequent Indian Buddhist temples were wooden buildings with structural load-bearing wood lintels across openings. The rock-cut excavated cave temples were more durable, and the non-load-bearing carved stone lintels allowed creative ornamental uses of classical Buddhist elements. Highly skilled artisans were able to simulate the look of wood, imitating the nuances of a wooden structure and the wood grain in excavating cave temples from monolithic rock. In freestanding Indian building examples, the Hoysala architecture tradition between the 11th and 14th centuries produced many elaborately carved non-structural stone lintels in the Southern Deccan Plateau region of southern India. The Hoysala Empire era was an important period in the development of art and architecture in the South Indian Kannadiga culture. It is remembered today primarily for its Hindu temples' mandapa, lintels, and other architectural elements, such as at the Chennakesava Temple.

The Maya civilization in the Americas was known for its sophisticated art and monumental architecture. The Mayan city of Yaxchilan, on the Usumacinta River in present-day southern Mexico, specialized in the stone carving of ornamental lintel elements within structural stone lintels. The earliest carved lintels were created in 723 CE. At the Yaxchilan archaeological site there are fifty-eight lintels with decorative pieces spanning the doorways of major structures. Among the finest Mayan carving to be excavated are three temple door lintels that feature narrative scenes of a queen celebrating the king's anointing by a god.

== Radiation protection ==
Lintels may also be used to reduce scattered radiation in medical applications. For example, Medical linacs operating at high energies will produce activated neutrons which will be scattered outside the treatment bunker maze with a dose rate that depends on the maze cross section. Lintels may be visible or recessed in the roof of the facility, and reduce dose rate in publicly accessible areas by reducing the maze cross section.

== Types ==
=== Decoration ===
- Atalburu – Basque decorative lintel
- Marriage stone – decorative (can be structural) lintel

=== Structure ===
- Architrave – structural lintel or beam resting on columns-pillars
- Dolmen – prehistoric megalithic tombs with structural stone lintels
- Dougong – traditional Chinese structural element
- I-beam – steel lintels and beams
- Post and lintel

== Gallery ==
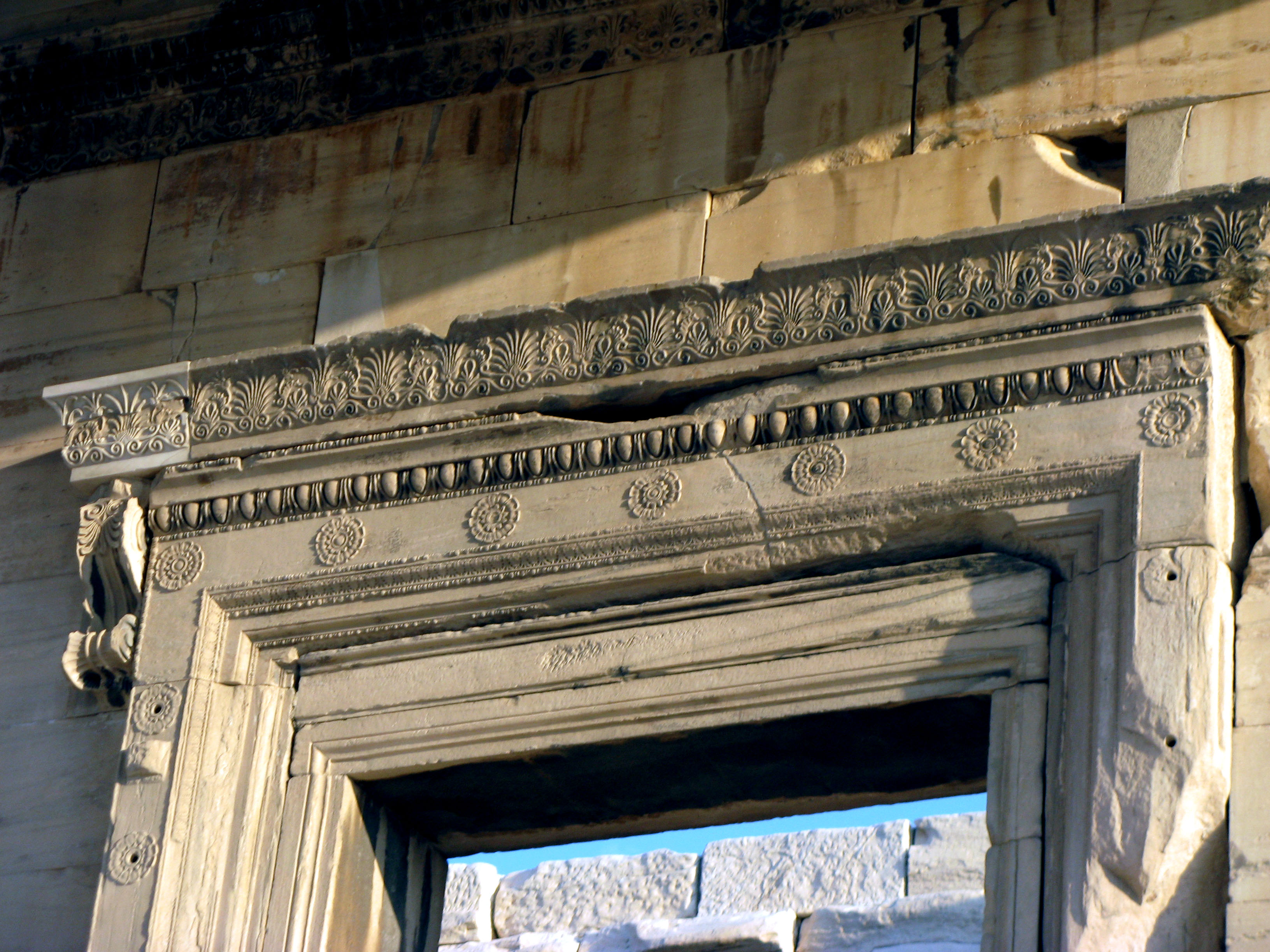
Structural lintel over entrance, Erechtheion, Athens, Greece

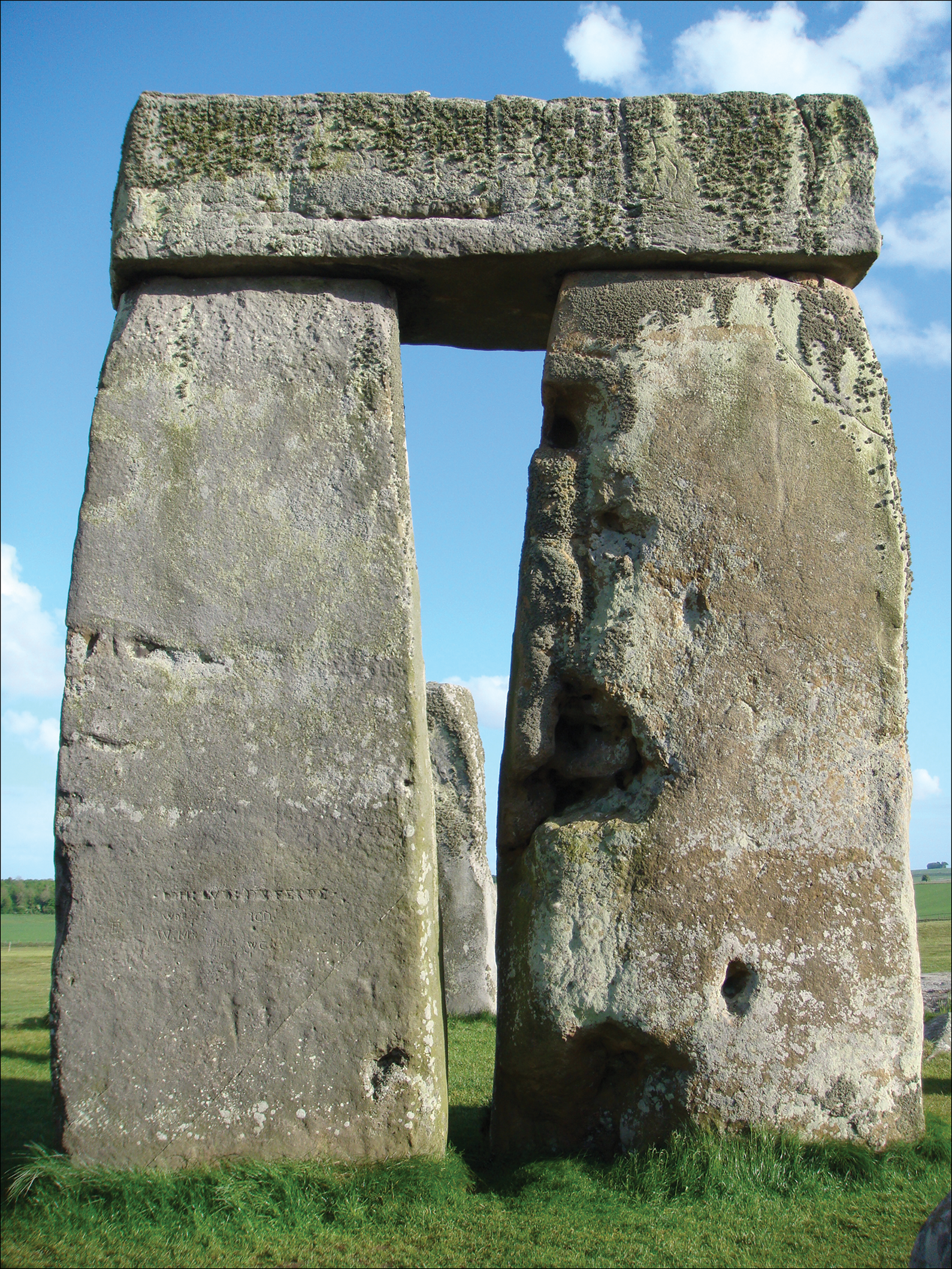
A trilithon at Stonehenge, showing a lintel stone supported by two large post stones

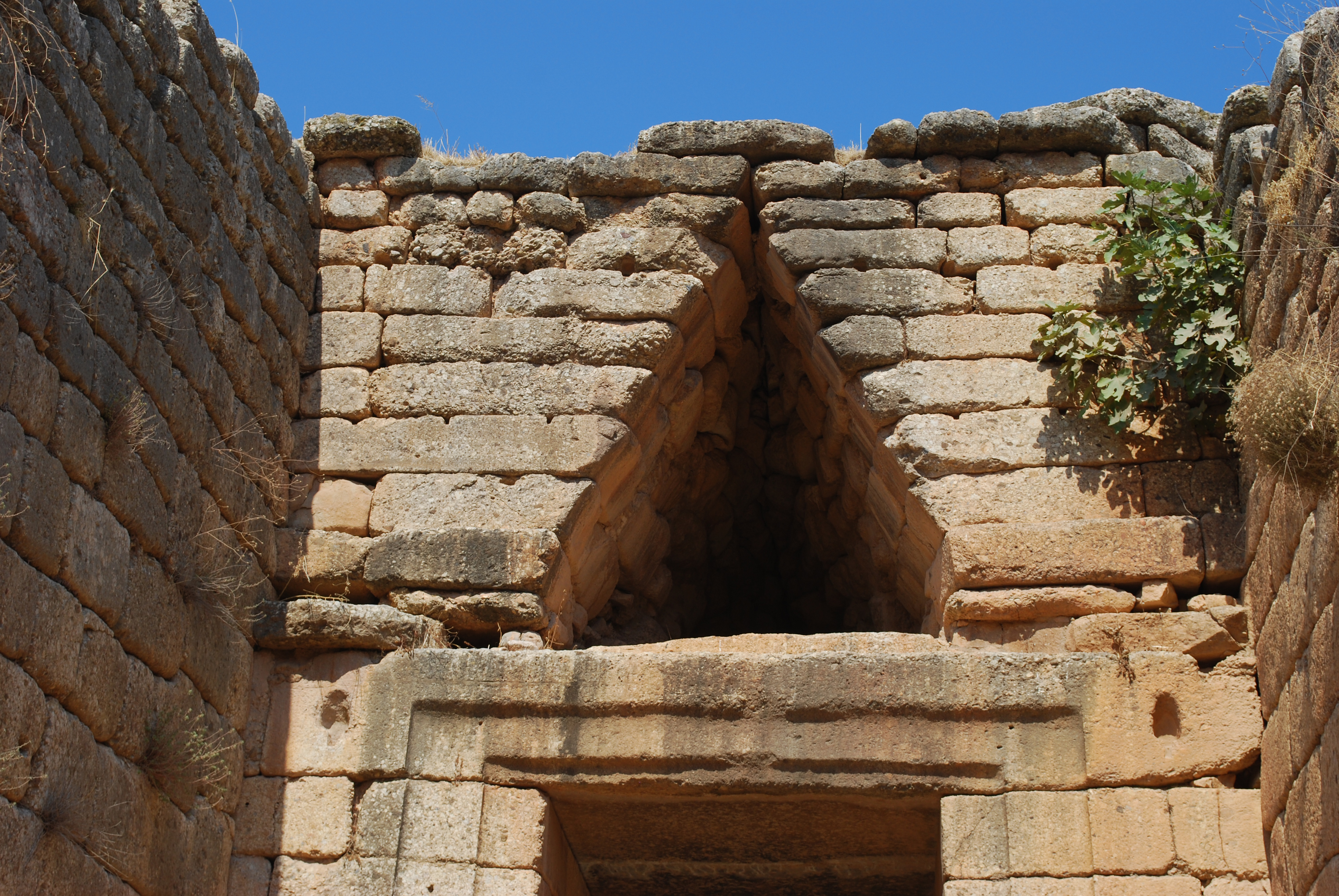
The lintel stone at the Treasury of Atreus, Mycenae, Greece (external view)

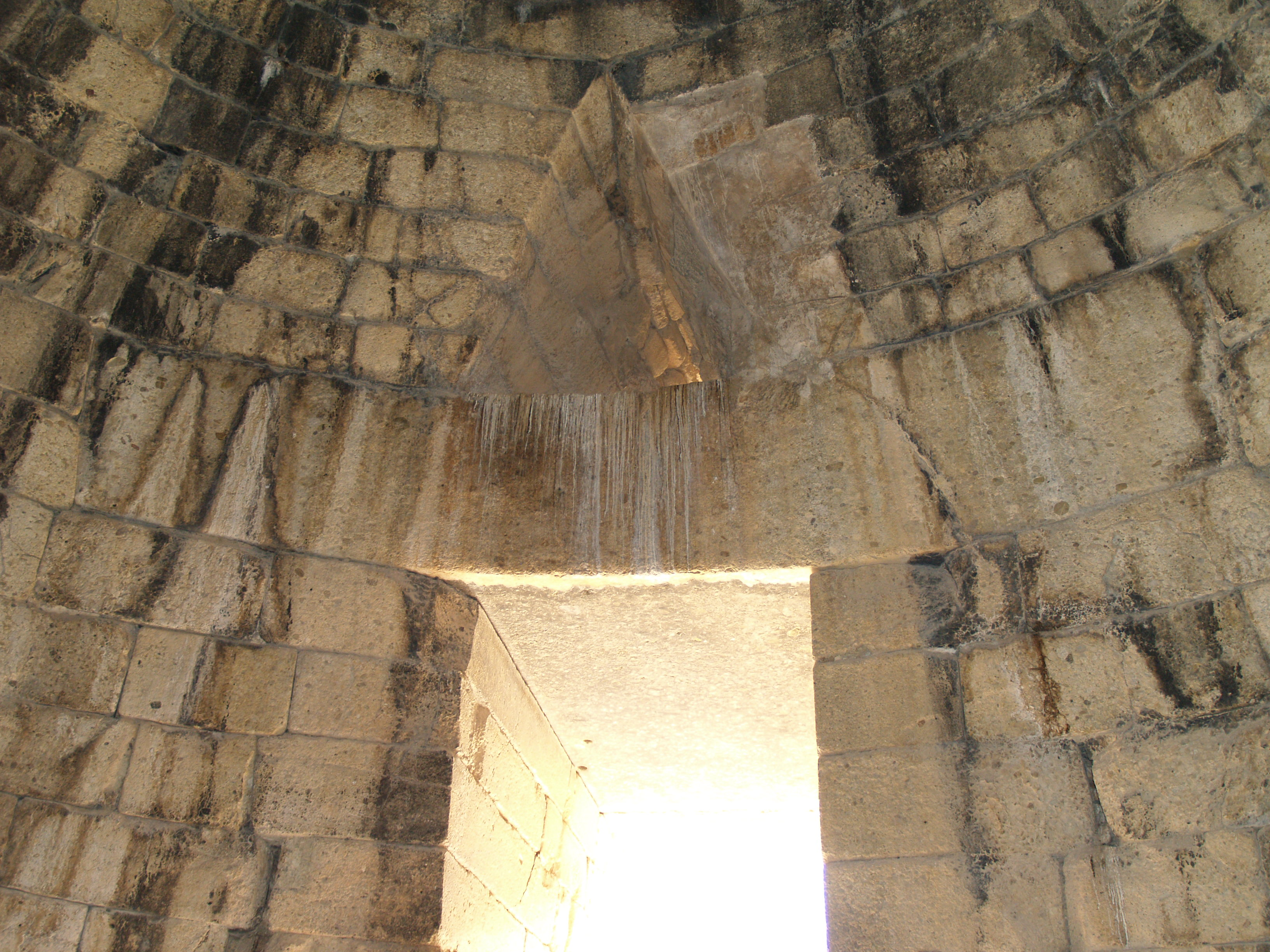
The lintel stone at the Treasury of Atreus (internal view)

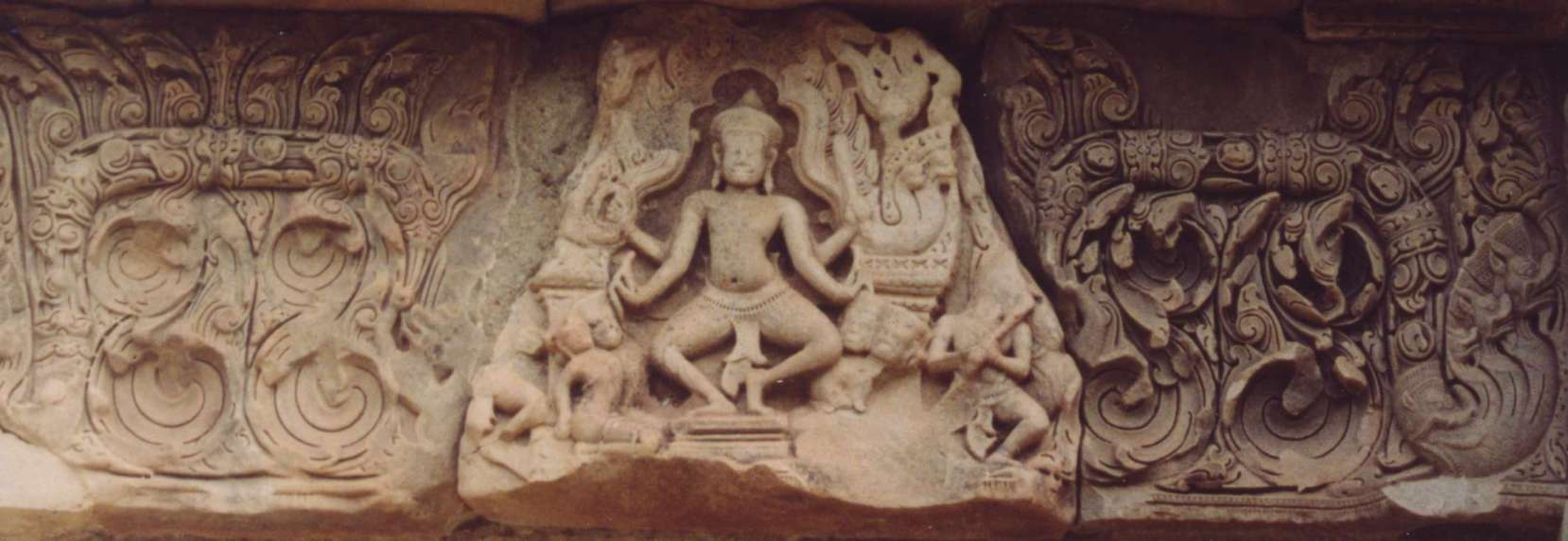
Structural lintel over the entry to main Buddhist shrine, Phimai historical park, Thailand

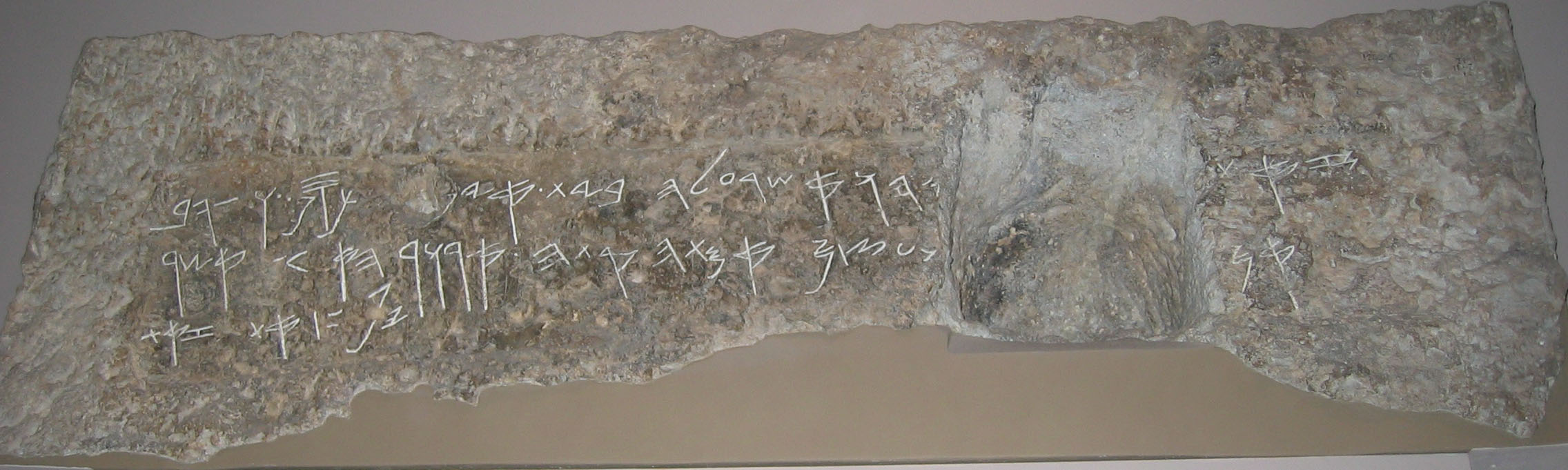
Shebna Inscription on a lintel of a tomb cave near Jerusalem, 8th/7th century BCE

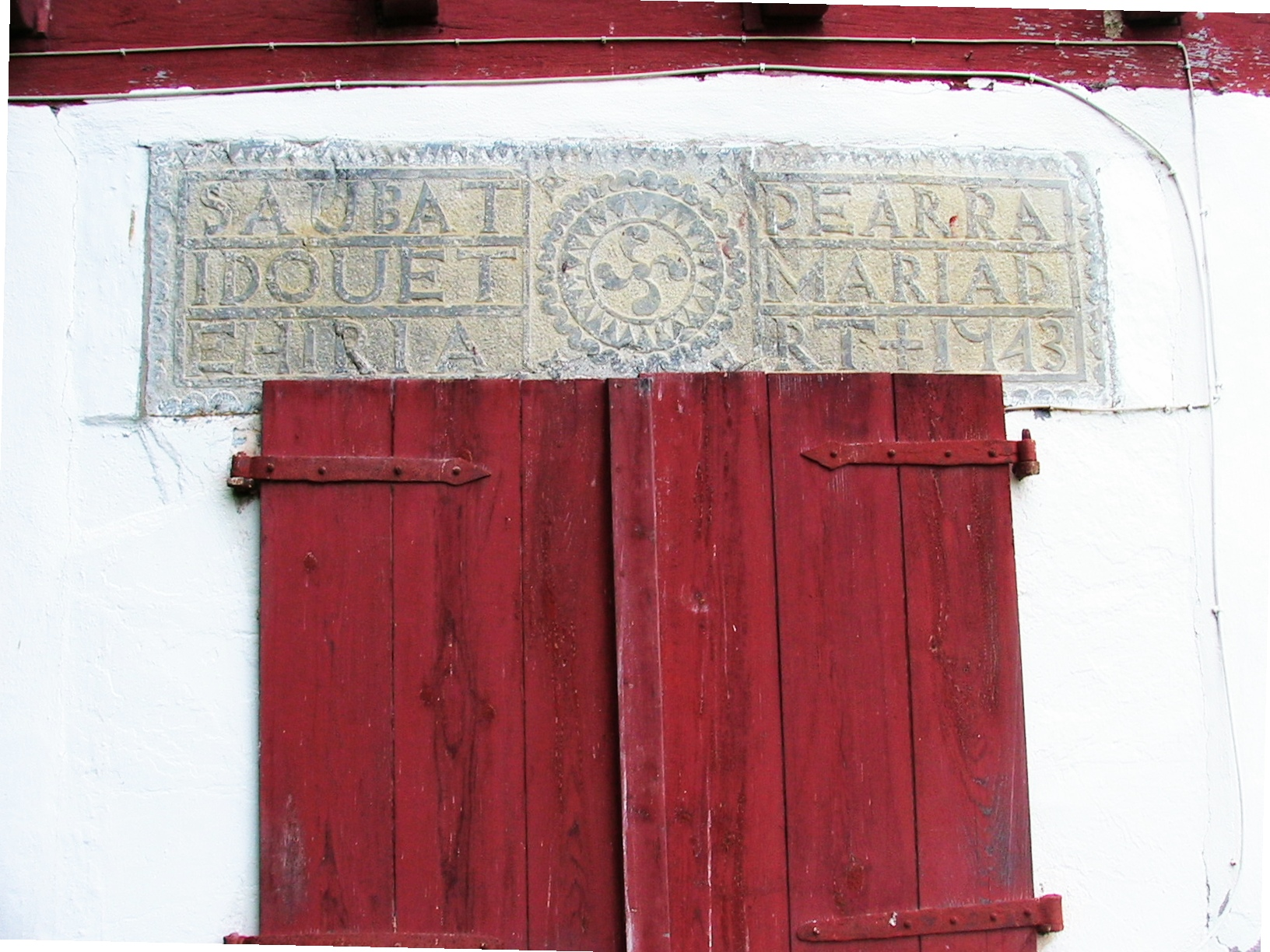
Structural lintel with a lauburu and founders' names, above traditional Basque houses in Lower Navarre, Spain

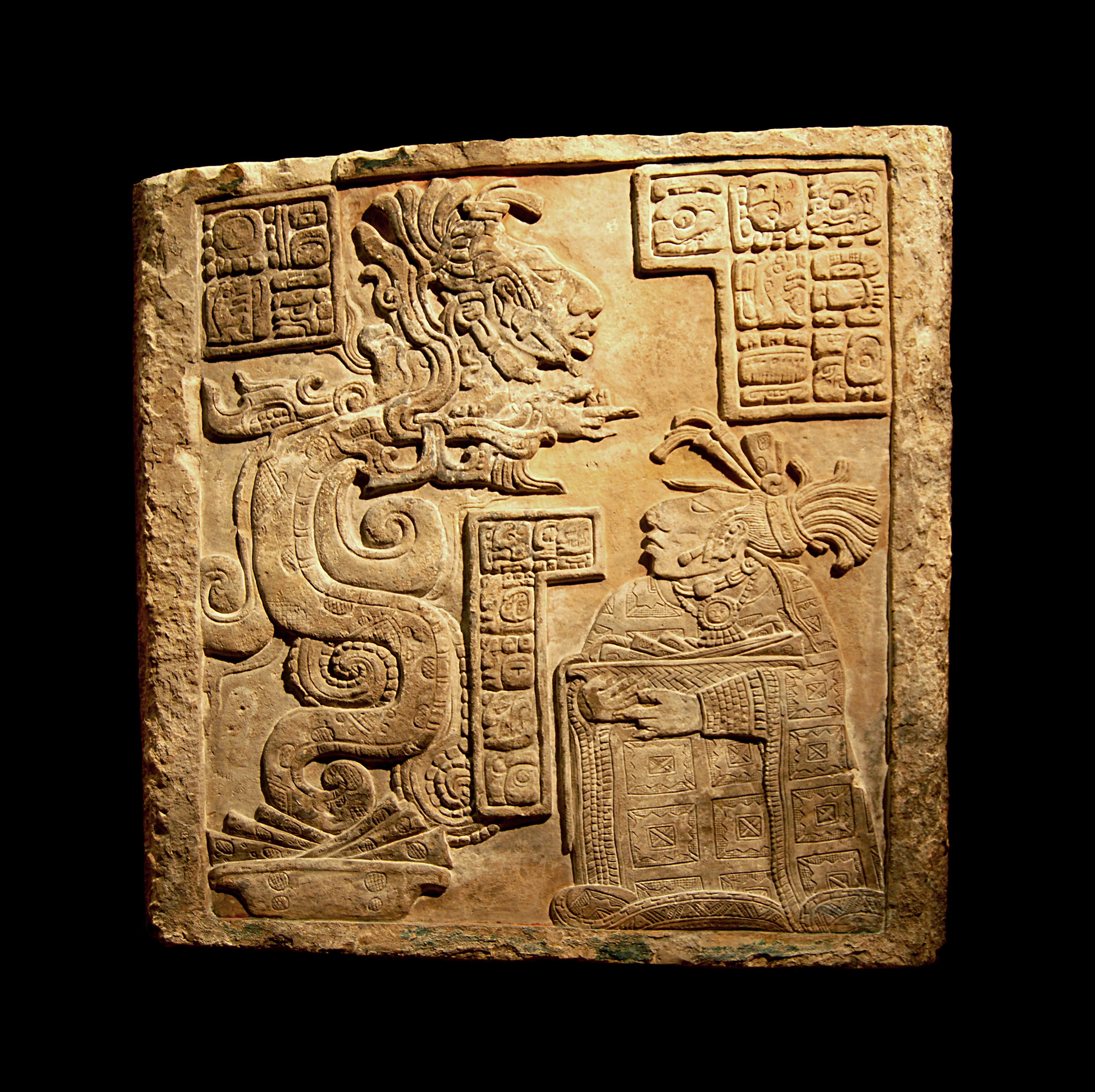
Non-structural Mayan ornamental lintel stone, from the Yaxchilan city site in Chiapas, southern Mexico. (Late Classic period, 600-900 CE).

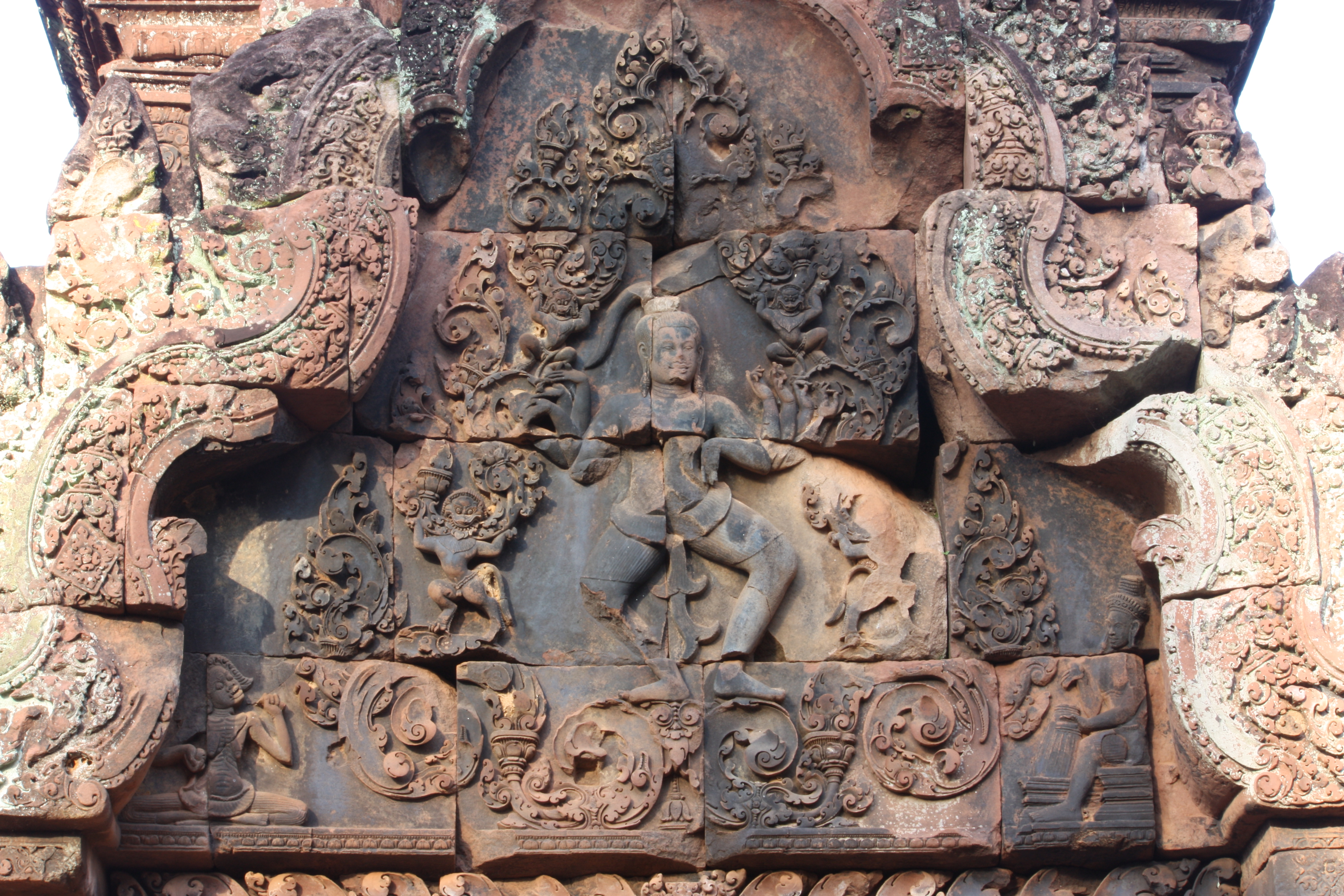
Non-structural decorative lintel at Buddhist Banteay Srei, in Cambodia

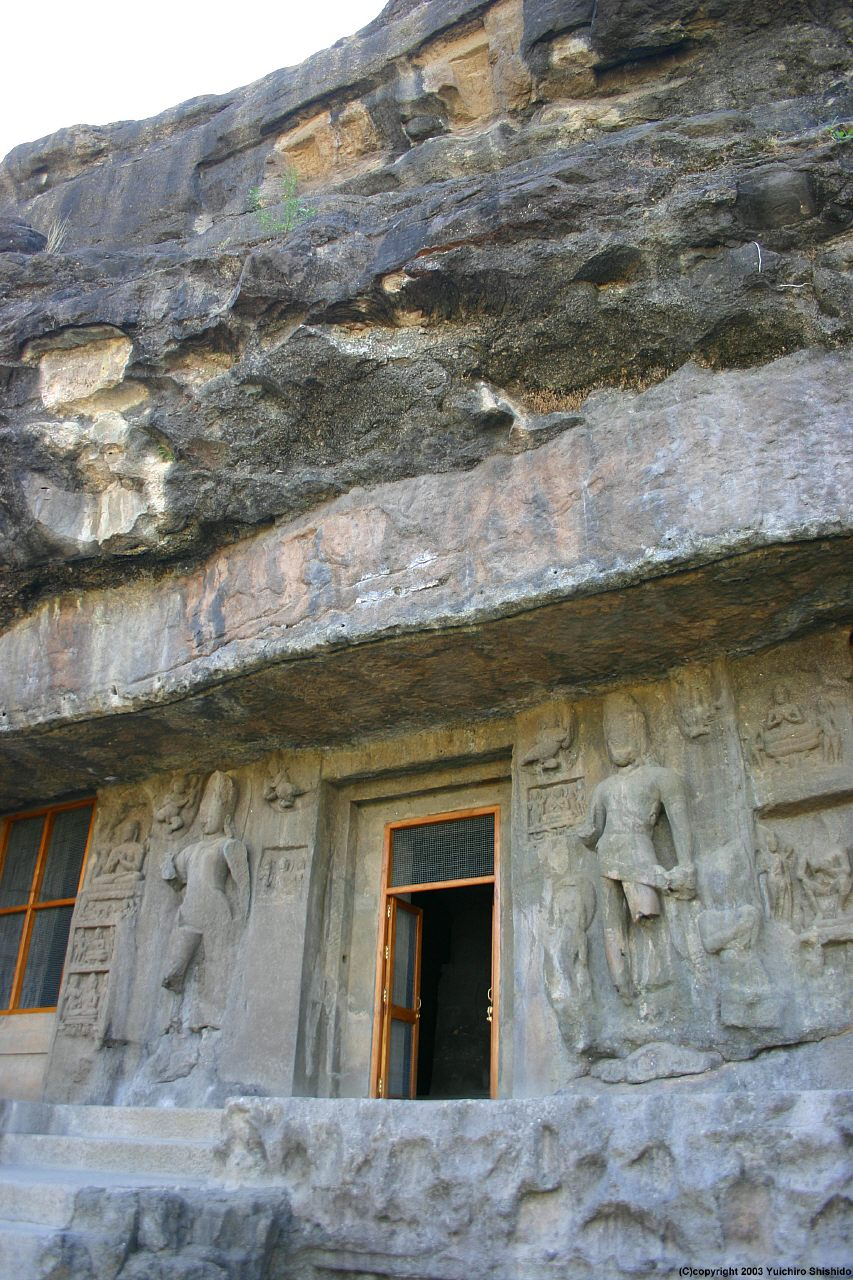
Non-structural lintel in Buddhist cave temple at Ellora Caves, India

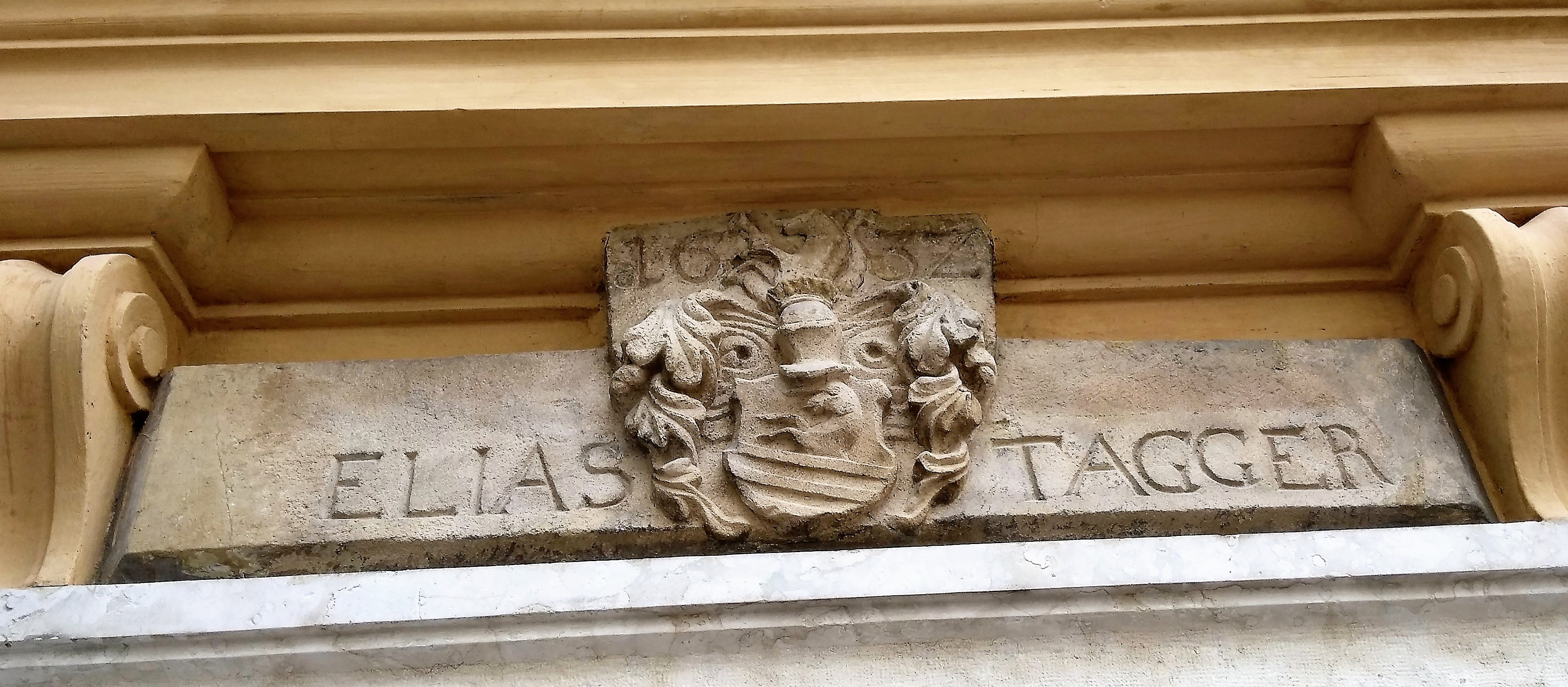
Door lintel in Bozen-Bolzano from 1632 with Elias Tagger's coat of arms, South Tyrol, Italy

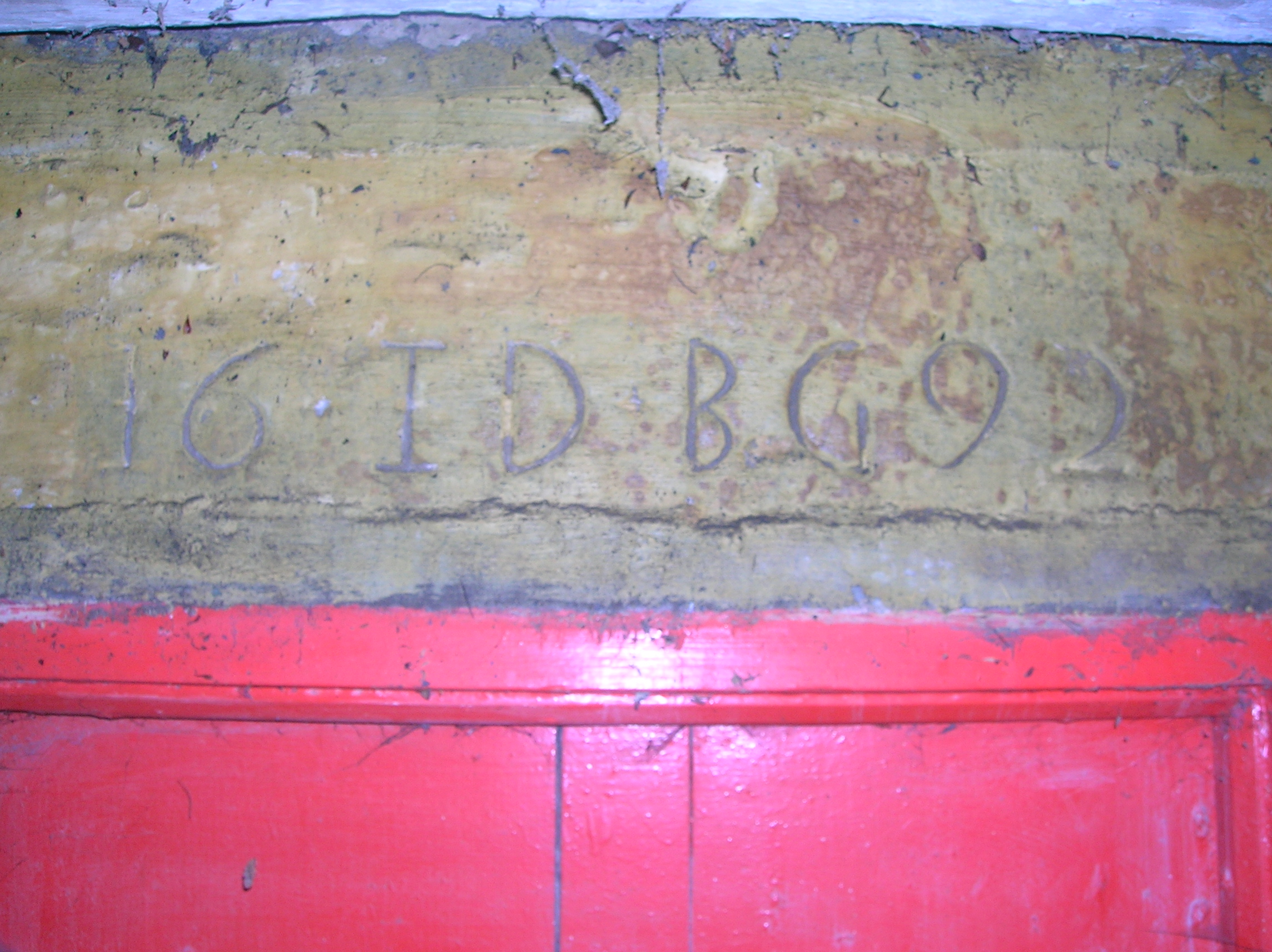
Non-structural marriage stone lintel at 'The Hill' farm, Dunlop, East Ayrshire, Scotland

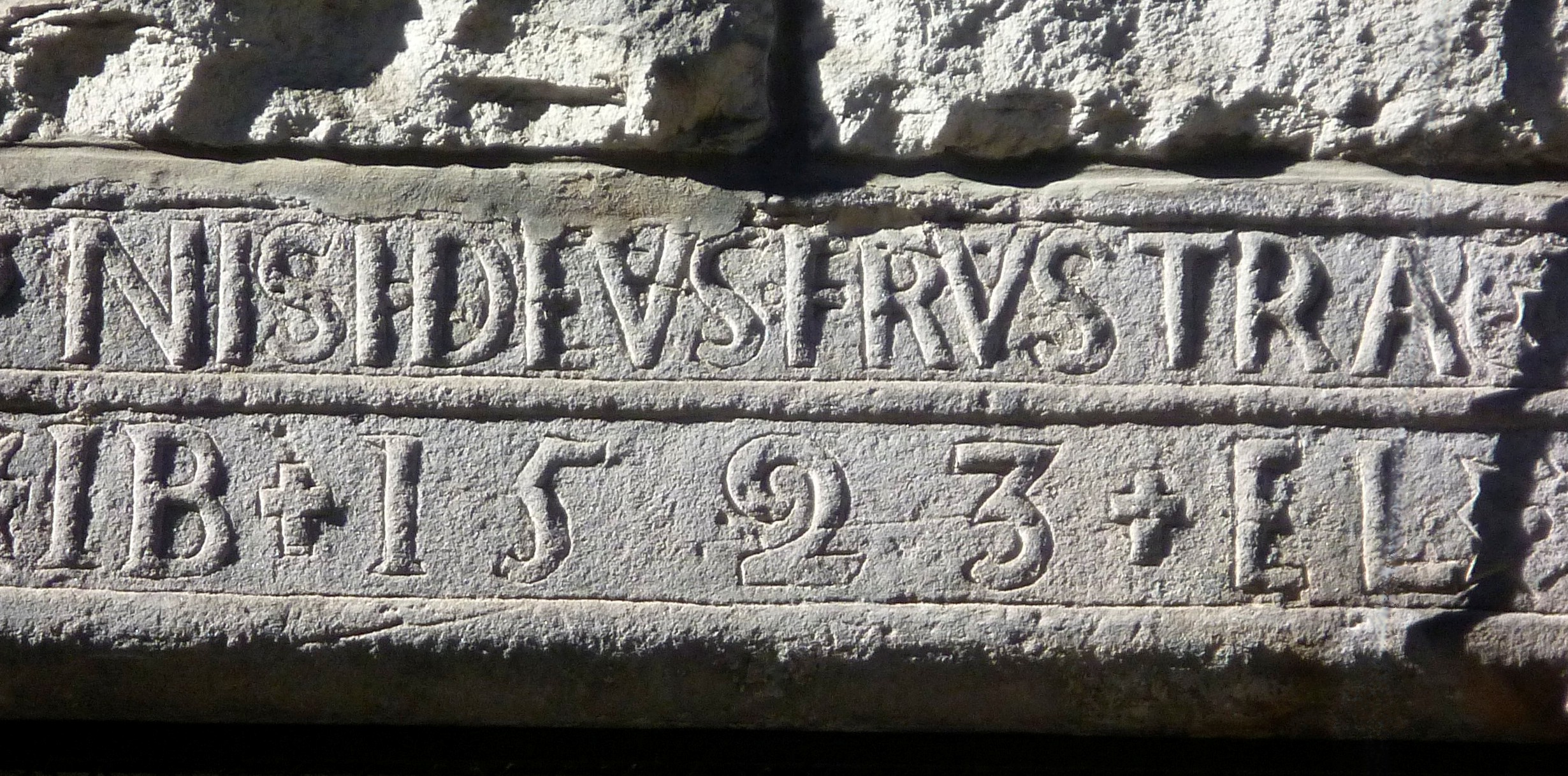
One of many 16th century door lintels in Edinburgh's Old Town

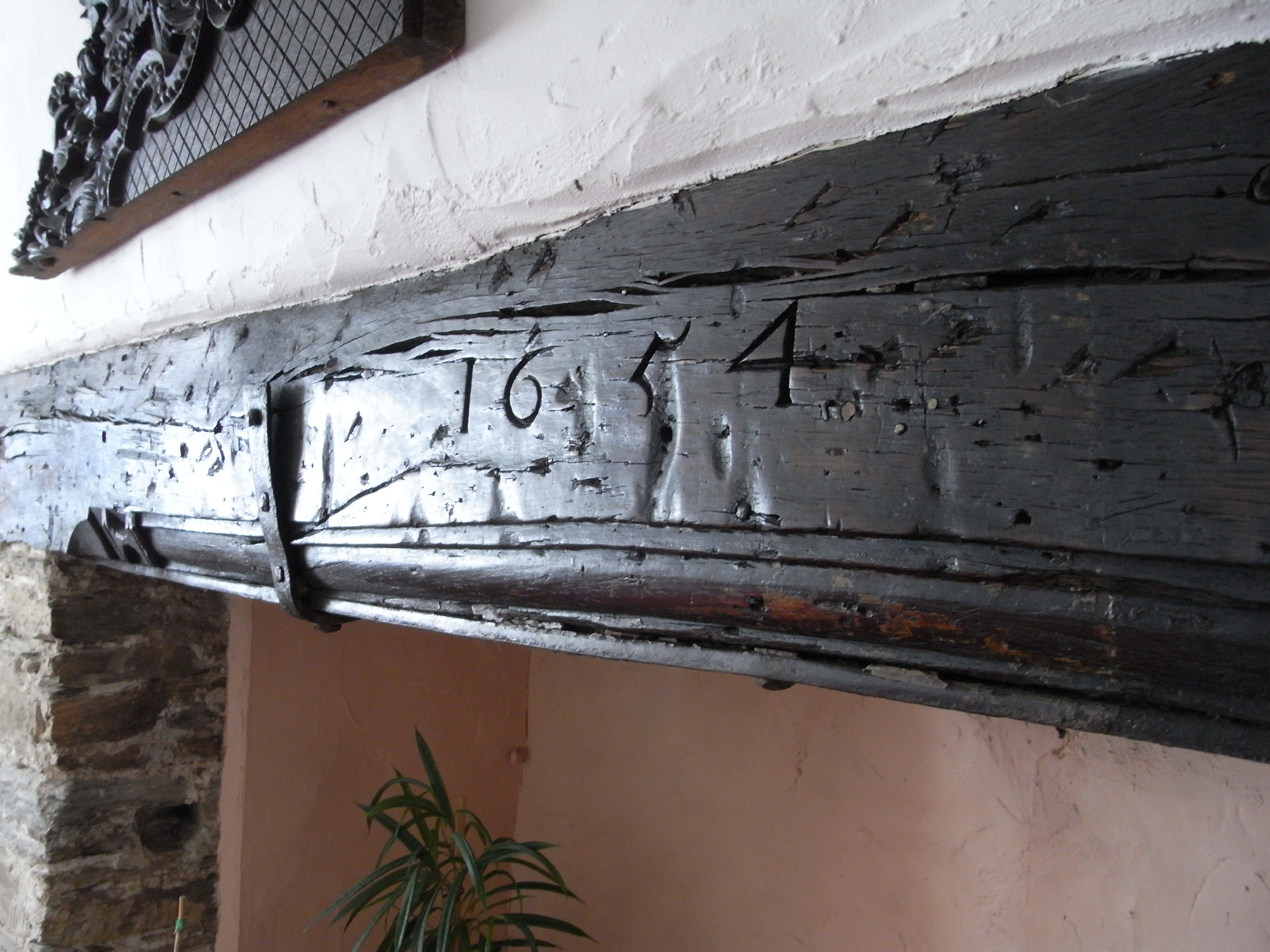
Simonsbath House, Simonsbath, Exmoor Parish, Devon. Wooden lintel over kitchen fireplace with carved date of 1654

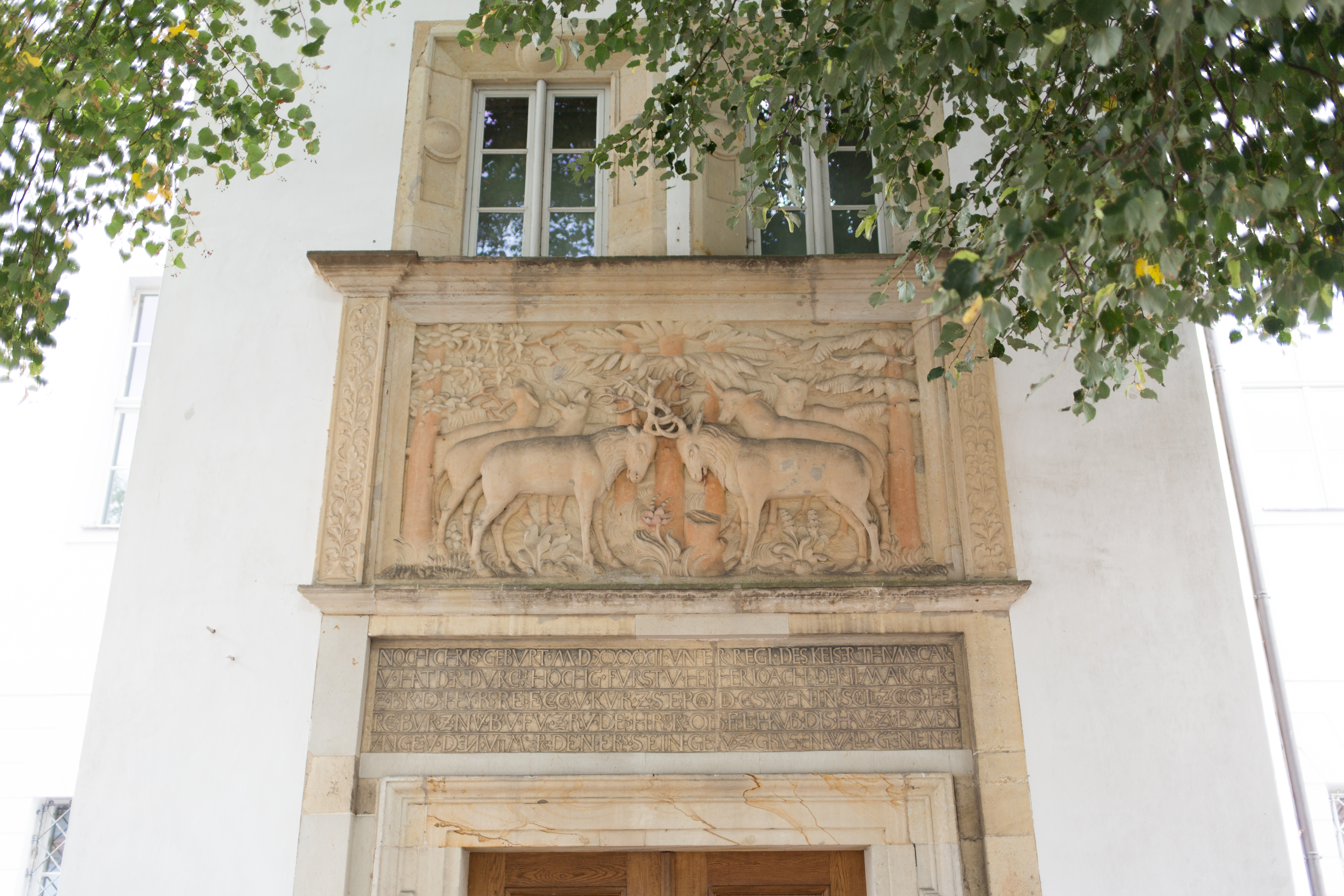
Lintel above the entrance to Jagdschloss Grunewald, Germany

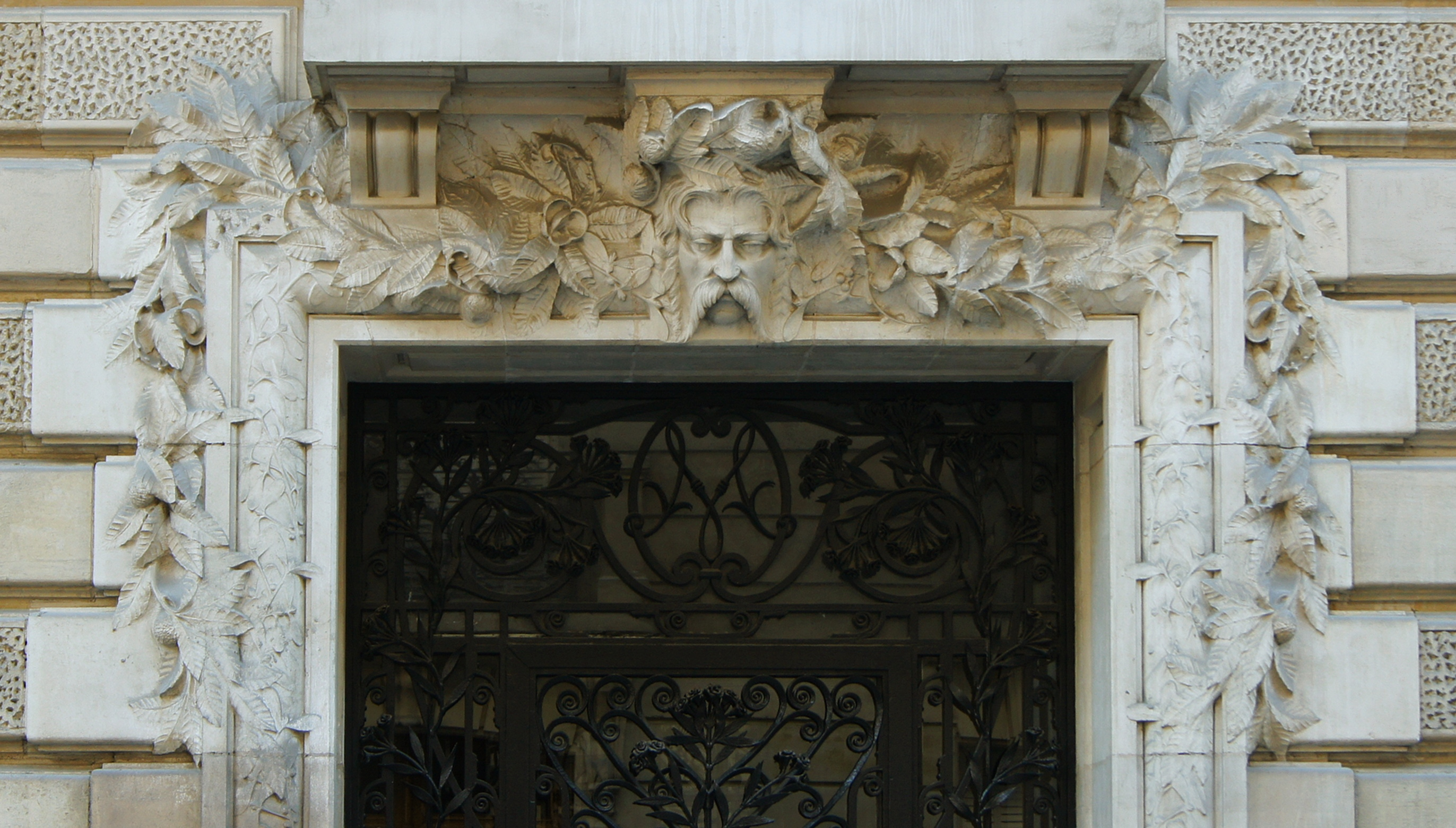
Lintel above a door from Paris

== See also ==
- Span (architecture)
