= Waffle slab foundation =

A waffle slab foundation, also called a ribbed slab foundation, is an above-ground type of foundation used to provide load-bearing capacity in expansive, rocky or hydro collapsible soils. The foundation is created by placing a series of single-use plastic forms set directly on grade to create a grid of ribs, and then monolithically pouring a post tensioned, rebar or Fiber reinforced concrete slab, usually 4 to 8 inches thick between the ribs. Sometimes, expanded polystyrene blocks are used instead of plastic forms, to prevent creating an air space under the slab. The monolithic pour creates concrete beams running throughout the footprint and perimeter of the foundation, with voids between, in one operation. The completed slab then sits on the ground bearing on the ribs created between the forms. The void areas underneath the slab allow for soil movement.

The waffle slab foundation is very stiff, with strength to resist differential swelling resulting from landscaping practices, surface drainage, or flooding from any source. It does not require presoaking underlying soil pads, and there is no need for footings, meaning no earth spoils. And, since the slab section is typically 14 to 20 inches above grade, it typically does not require a capillary break or moisture barrier.

Current design practice provides post-tensioned on-grade slabs with stiffness equal to or better than other post-tensioned slab types, but with less susceptibility to swell pressures exerted by expansive soils. An on-grade mat foundation provides all of the elements of the in-ground rib and uniform thickness slabs, but with greater performance provided by its geometry and smaller contact area.

== Building Code considerations ==
Waffle slab foundations adhere to International Building Code requirements. By 2008, most states put into effect the changes adopted in the 2006 IBC and, in regards to foundations, the on-grade mat foundation has become a more attractive design because, as an engineered system, it already accommodates the 2008 design recommendations, and required no major modifications to bring it into compliance. In 2008, the Post-Tensioning Institute (PTI) approved two key specifications for waffle-slab foundations and incorporated them into the PTI Manual, which is frequently referenced by building codes for post-tensioned slab design.

- Section 4.5.2.1 was revised to permit rib spacing of less than 6 feet, and to clarify what spacing shall be used to compute moments and shears.
- Section 4.5.2.3 was revised to limit rib widths to a range of 6 to 14 inches (from the previous 8 to 14 inches).

== Performance of an on-grade mat foundation ==
=== Structural considerations ===
An engineer designing an on-grade slab makes the same calculations and follows the same requirements used in the design of traditional post-tensioned slabs on grade, and then applies them to the on-grade mat foundation ensuring the system possesses equal or greater stiffness.

=== Geotechnical considerations ===
The higher contact pressures along the base of the ribs and the voids or low pressure areas in the system limit deformations of soil due to moisture variation to the void spaces, reducing the impact of the soil's volume change on the on-grade mat slabs.

=== Environmental considerations ===
Environmental engineers note reduced carbon emissions and air quality emissions are usually of the same magnitude as the reduction in concrete needed for any foundation project. Since use of an on-grade mat foundation typically results in a 20% - 30% reduction in concrete, a similar or even greater reduction in carbon emissions and air emissions will also occur. Because a waffle slab uses less raw materials (cement, iron, fuel, water, aggregate, and sand) than traditional slab-on-grade foundations, the system is also more environmentally sustainable.

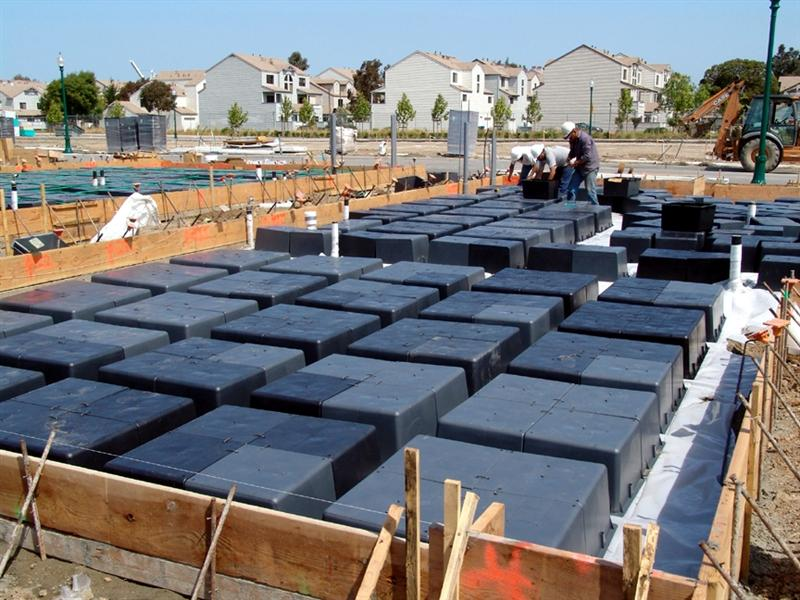

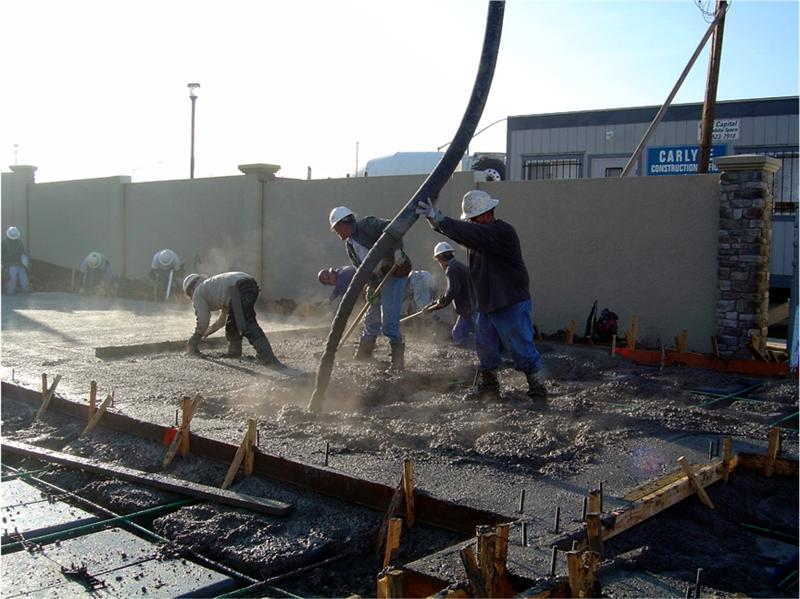

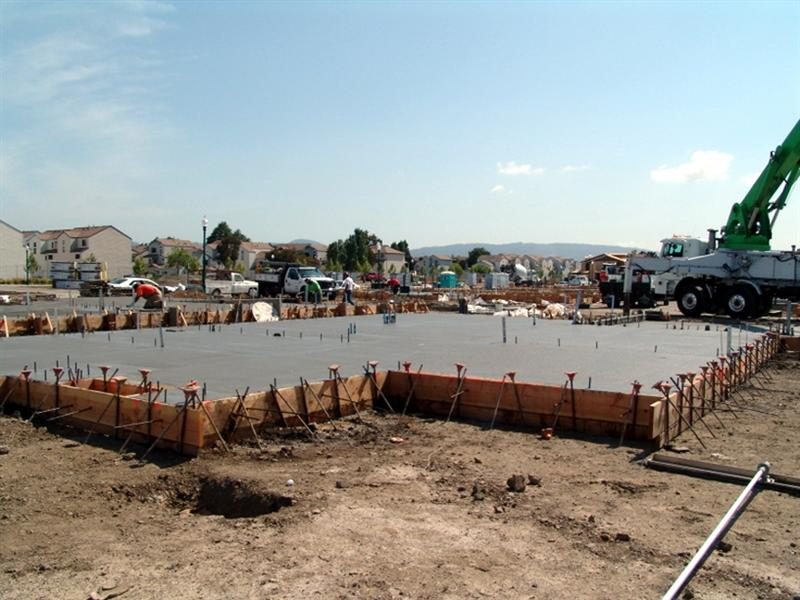

== See also ==
- Waffle slab
