= Waffle slab =

Concrete flooring structural system

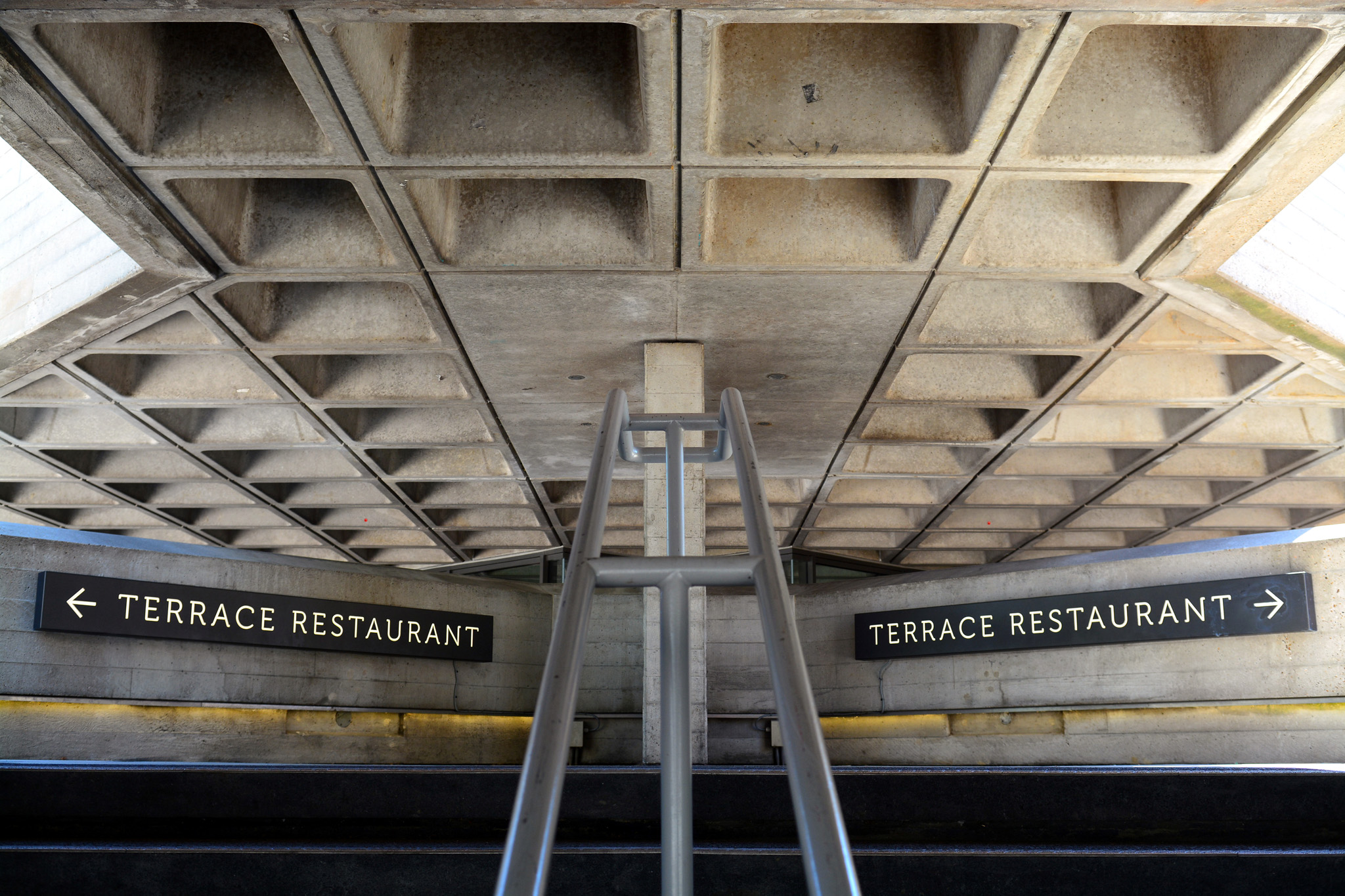
The underside of a waffle slab, showing the grid-like structure, from Washington's National Theatre.

A waffle slab or two-way joist slab is a concrete slab made of reinforced concrete with concrete ribs running in two directions on its underside. The name waffle comes from the grid pattern created by the reinforcing ribs. Waffle slabs are preferred for spans greater than 40 feet (12 m), because, for a given mass of concrete, they are much stronger than flat slabs, flat slabs with drop panels, two-way slabs, one-way slabs, and one-way joist slabs.

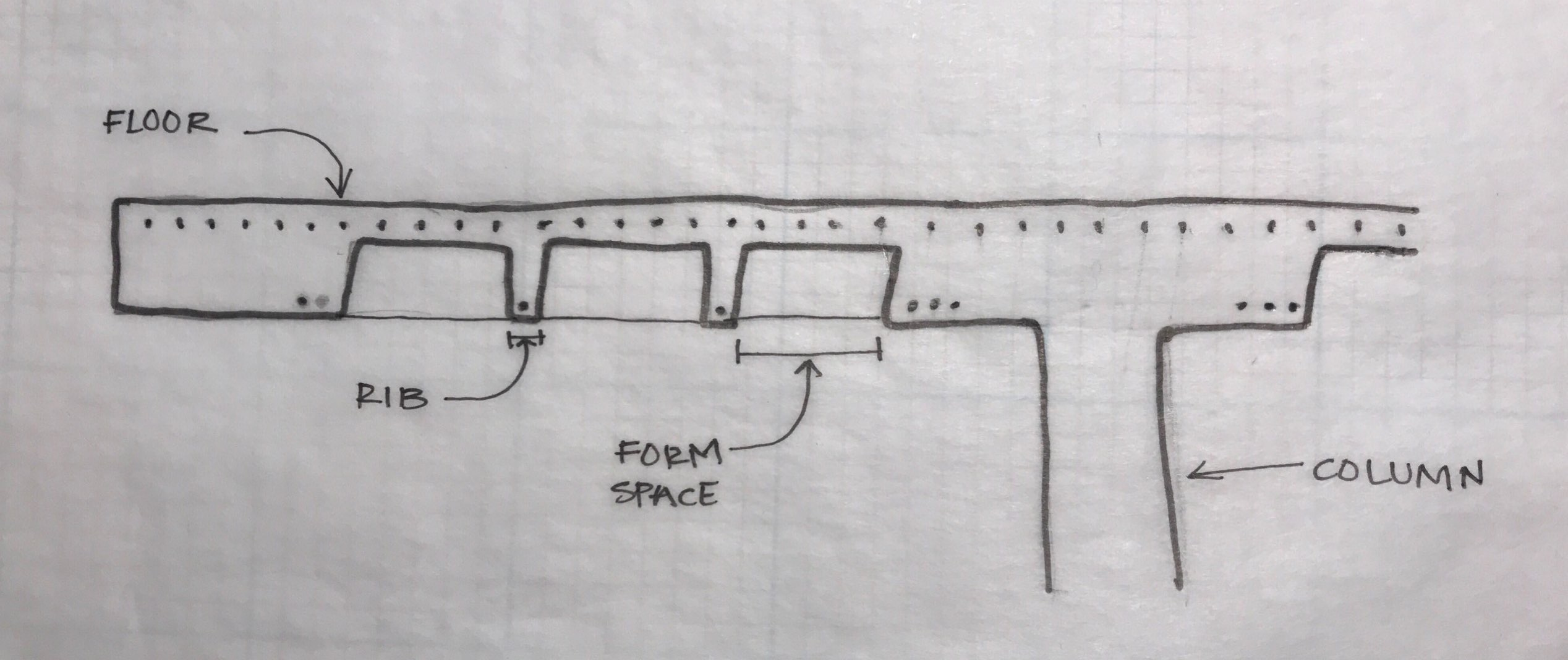
Section of a waffle slab including beam, ribs, and column head

== Description ==
A waffle slab is flat on top, while joists create a grid-like surface on the bottom. The grid is formed by the removal of molds after the concrete sets. This structure was designed to be more solid when used on longer spans and with heavier loads. This type of structure, because of its rigidity, is recommended for buildings that require minimal vibration, like laboratories and manufacturing facilities. It is also used in buildings that require big open spaces, like theatres or train stations. Waffle slabs are composed by intricate formwork, and may be more expensive than other types of slabs, but depending on the project and the quantity of concrete needed, it may be cheaper to build.

There are two types of waffle-slab system: one-way and two-way.

== Construction process ==
A waffle slab can be made in different ways, but generic forms are needed to give the waffle shape to the slab. The formwork is made up of many elements: waffle pods, horizontal supports, vertical supports, cube junctions, hole plates, clits, and steel bars. First the supports are built, then the pods are arranged in place, and finally the concrete is poured. This process may occur in three different approaches; however, the basic method is the same in each:

- In situ: Formwork construction and pouring of concrete occur on site; then the slab is assembled (if required).
- Precast: The slabs are made somewhere else and then brought to the site and assembled.
- Prefabricated: The reinforcements are integrated into the slab while being manufactured, without needing to reinforce the assembly on site. This is the most expensive option.

=== Waffle-slab design ===
Different guides have been made for architects and engineers to determine various parameters of waffle slabs, primarily the overall thickness and rib dimensions. The following are rules of thumb, which are explained further in the accompanying diagrams:

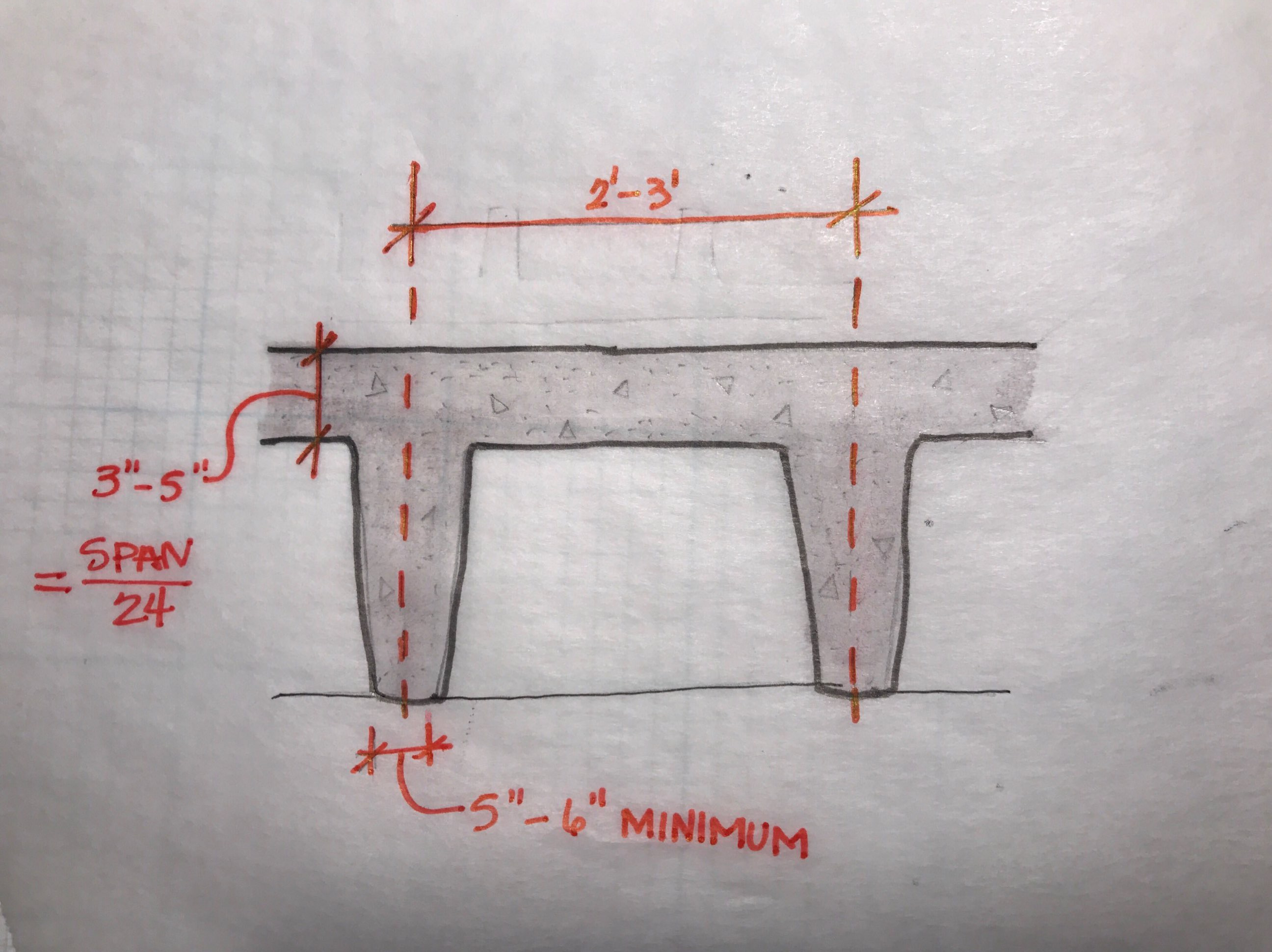
Slab- and rib-width with rules of thumb

- Slab depth is typically 75 mm (3 in) to 130 mm (5 in) thick. As a rule of thumb, the depth should be 1/24 of the span.
- The width of the ribs is typically 130 mm (5 in) to 150 mm (6 in), and ribs usually have steel rod reinforcements.
- The distance between ribs is typically 3 ft (90 cm).
- The height of the ribs and beams should be 1/25 of the span between columns.
- The width of the solid area around the column should be 1/8 of the span between columns. Its height should be the same as the ribs.
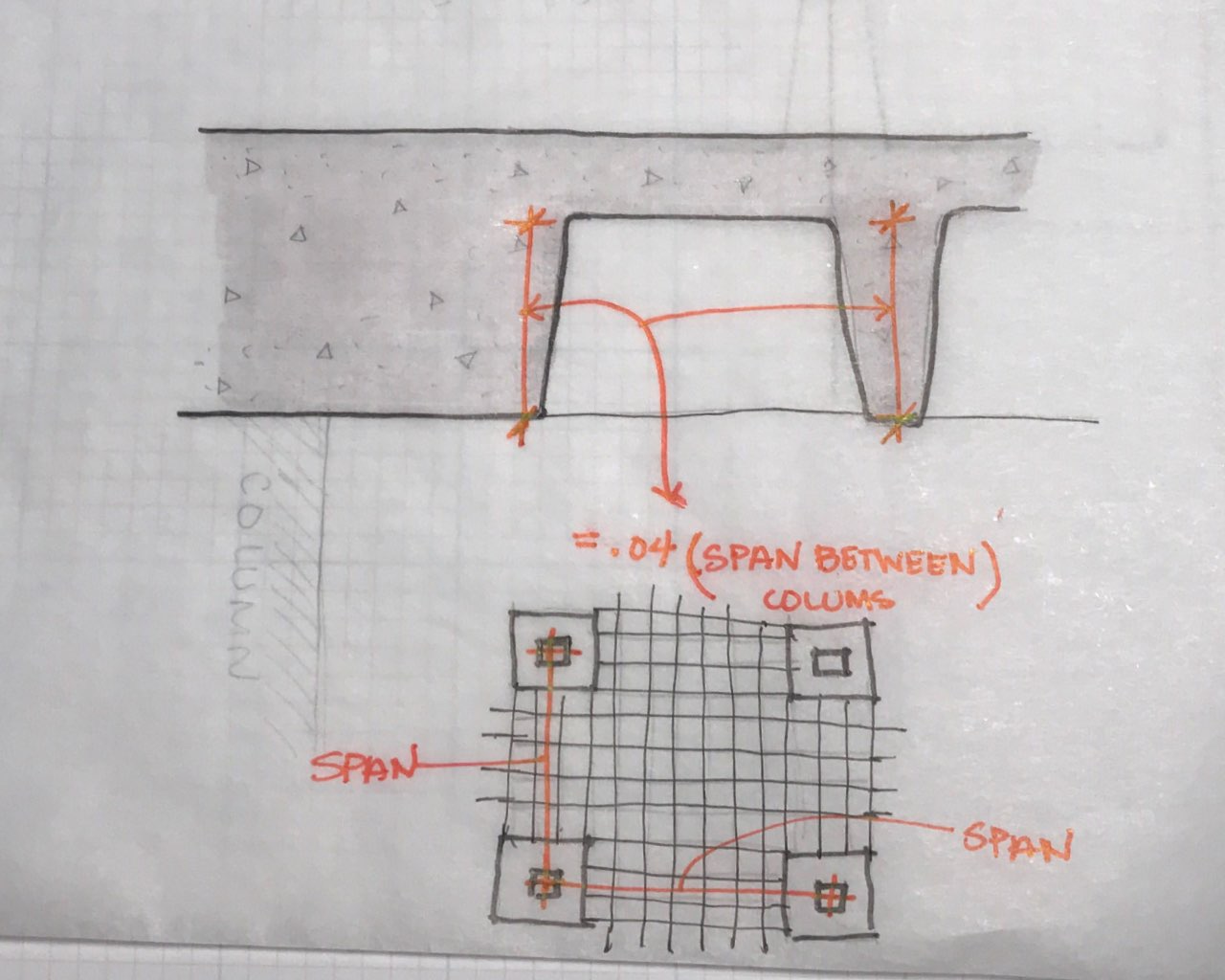
  Rib and beam heights rule of thumb

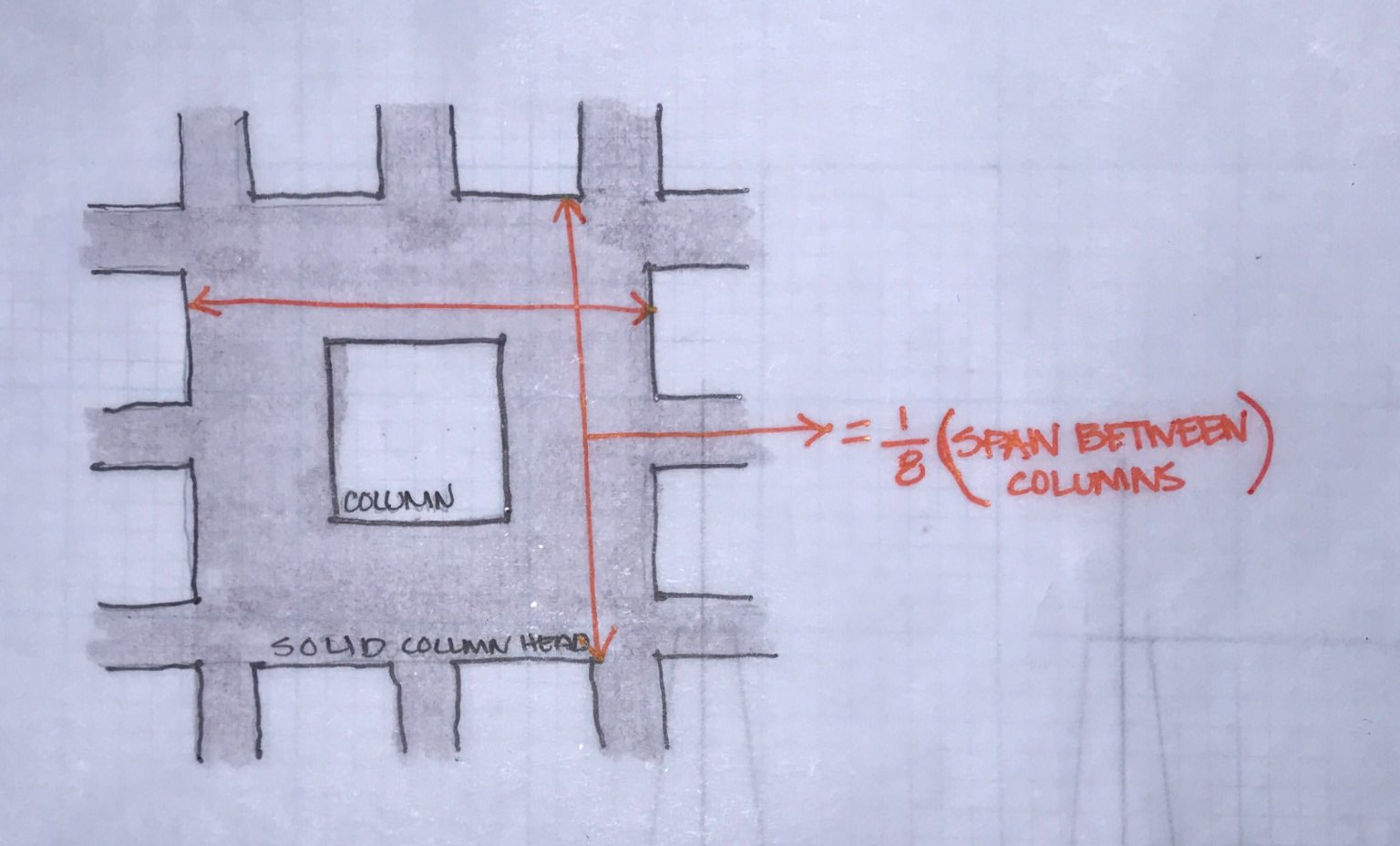
Width of the column head with rule of thumb

== Advantages ==
The waffle-slab floor system has several advantages:

- It is better for buildings that require less vibration – this is managed by the two-way joist reinforcements that form the grid.
- Bigger spans can be achieved with less material, which is more economical and environmentally friendly.
- Some people find the waffle pattern aesthetically pleasing.
- It has a greater load capacity than traditional one-way slabs.
- Forms can be implemented with wood, concrete, or steel.
- If holes are provided between the ribs, the building services can be run through them. One proprietary implementation of this system is called Holedeck.

== Disadvantages ==
- Greater quantities of formwork materials are needed, which can be very costly.
- Waffle slabs are thicker than flat slabs, so the height between each floor must be greater to have enough space for the slab system and other building services.
- Waffle slabs are preferred for flat topographical areas, not sloped sites.

== Examples ==
- Royal National Theatre, London, United Kingdom
- Harborplace, Baltimore, Maryland
- Washington Metro Building
- Logistic and Telecommunication SL, Madrid, Spain
- Barangaroo House, Sydney, Australia
- GS1 Portugal, Lisboa, Portugal
- Galbraith Hall, UC San Diego, California
- odD House, Quito, Ecuador
- Centro de Bellas Artes de Caguas Parking Garage, Caguas, Puerto Rico

== See also ==
- Waffle slab foundation
- Reinforced concrete
- Concrete slab
- Formwork
