= Hollow-core slab =

Type of concrete slab

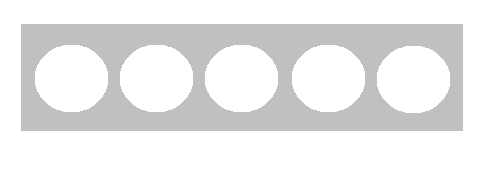
Diagram of a concrete slab of hollow core construction

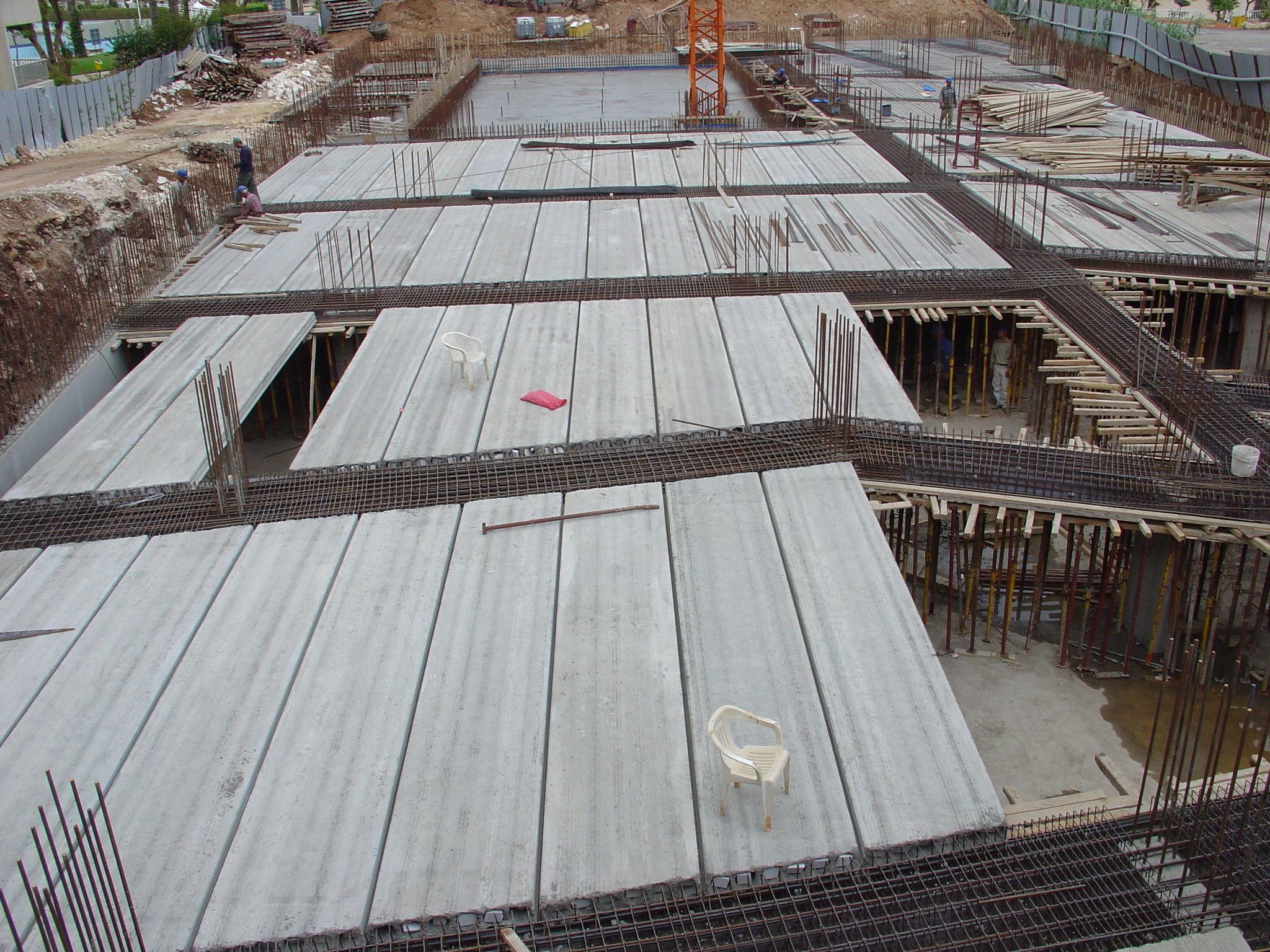
Photograph of a hollowcore assembly

A hollow core slab, also known as a voided slab, hollow core plank or simply a concrete plank is a precast slab of prestressed concrete typically used in the construction of floors in multi-story apartment buildings. The slab has been especially popular in countries where the emphasis of home construction has been on precast concrete, including Northern Europe and former socialist countries of Eastern Europe. Precast concrete popularity is linked with low-seismic zones and more economical constructions because of fast building assembly, lower self weight (less material), etc.

The precast concrete slab has tubular voids extending the full length of the slab, typically with a diameter between two-thirds and three-quarters of the thickness of the slab. This makes the slab much lighter than a massive solid concrete floor slab of equal thickness or strength. The reduced weight also lowers material and transportation costs. The slabs are typically 120 cm wide with standard thicknesses normally between 15 cm and 50 cm. Reinforcing steel wire rope provides bending resistance.

Slabs in prestressed concrete are usually produced in lengths of up to 200 meters. The process involves extruding wet concrete along with the prestressed steel wire rope from a moving mold. The continuous slab is then cut to required lengths by a large diamond circular saw. Factory production provides the obvious advantages of reduced time, labor and training.

Another fabrication system produces hollow-core floor slabs in reinforced concrete (not prestressed). These are made on carousel production lines, directly to exact length, and as a stock product. However, the length is limited to about 7-8 meters. Especially in Belgium, this method is widely used in private housing.

To meet modern standards (both hollow-core and massive slab) of soundproofing the floor needs to be covered with a soft floor covering that is able to dampen the sound of footsteps or a floating floor screed should be installed. An alternative is to put a strip of rubber underneath the floor slabs.

Hollow-core slabs and wall elements without prestressed steel wire can be formed by extruders. The size of these elements will typically range in width from 600 to 2400 mm, in thickness from 150 to 500 mm, and can be delivered in lengths of up to 24 m.

The voids of the hollow core can be used as conduit for installations. The interior of the core can be coated in order to use it as a ventilation duct.

== Bridges ==
Hollow-core slabs are also used in the construction of bridges. In many cases the slab is molded in situ.

== See also ==
- Hollow structural section
