= Beam and block =

Beam and block is a construction method to support flooring, especially for ground floors as well as multi story buildings. It is made of cast concrete, one piece of which is a prestressed concrete beam, which can be an inverted T-shaped beam, or lintel, the other piece being a simple rectangular block. The beams are placed at regular intervals and the blocks placed between them. They form a support for the next layer of flooring materials.

Beam and block is also referred to as rib and block or lintel and block in some countries. Certain countries incorporate the use of temporary propping for 21 days while other rib and block systems use propless systems. Systems where props are used incorporate lighter beams while the prop line allows for structural cross support. Propless systems used heavier inverted T beams to compensate for the exclusion of props.

The lintels and blocks are packed above load bearing walls under supervision and design by a structural engineer. This system is extremely versatile in achieving complex designs and using unskilled labour. It is cost efficient as well as easily understood by all contractors.

Polystyrene blocks are used to replace concrete hollow blocks for lightweight insulated slabs. This keeps buildings warmer in winter and cooler in summer. From a structural viewpoint a lighter slab assists by allowing load-bearing walls and foundations to take less strain.
