= 2015 deaths in British television =

This is a list of deaths that took place in 2015 related to British television.

== January ==
Date	Name	Age	Broadcast credibility
1 January	Fiona Cumming	77	Actress and director (Doctor Who)
1 January	Barbara Atkinson	88	Actress
3 January	Roger Kitter	65	Actor ('Allo 'Allo!)
6 January	Lance Percival	81	Comedian, actor and singer (That Was the Week That Was, Up Pompeii!)
7 January	Nancy Thomas	96	Television producer (Monitor)
10 January	Brian Clemens	83	Scriptwriter and producer (The Avengers, The New Avengers, The Professionals)
19 January	Anne Kirkbride	60	Actress (Coronation Street) Deirdre Barlow
19 January	Bob Symes	90	Inventor and television presenter
21 January	Pauline Yates	85	Actress (The Fall and Rise of Reginald Perrin)
23 January	Barrie Ingham	82	Actor (The Great Mouse Detective, Doctor Who, A Challenge for Robin Hood)
30 January	Geraldine McEwan	82	Actress (Agatha Christie's Marple, Mapp & Lucia)

== February ==
Date	Name	Age	Broadcast credibility
4 February	Richard Bonehill	67	Actor and stuntman (Doctor Who, Return of the Jedi)
14 February	Pamela Cundell	95	Actress (Dad's Army, EastEnders, A Fantastic Fear of Everything)
14 February	Alan Howard	77	Actor (The Lord of the Rings)
15 February	Eileen Essell	92	Actress (Duplex, Charlie and the Chocolate Factory, The Producers)
25 February	Barry Newbery	88	Production designer (Doctor Who)

== March ==
Date	Name	Age	Broadcast credibility
6 March	Osi Rhys Osmond	71	Painter and television presenter.
10 March	Stuart Wagstaff	90	Entertainer
13 March	Vincent Wong	87	Actor (Doctor Who, James Bond, Ministry of Mayhem)
17 March	Shaw Taylor	90	Television presenter and actor (Police 5)
21 March	Jackie Trent	74	Singer-songwriter (co-authored Neighbours theme)
23 March	Lil' Chris	24	Singer-songwriter, actor, and television personality (Rock School, CharliiTV)

== April ==
Date	Name	Age	Broadcast credibility
2 April	Dennis Marks	66	Television producer and music director
3 April	Robert Rietti	92	Actor
2 April	Tom Coyne	84	News broadcaster and television presenter (Top Gear)
9 April	Richie Benaud	84	Cricket commentator
9 April	Paul Almond	83	Director (Up Series)
13 April	Rex Robinson	89	Actor (Doctor Who, Yes Minister, Only Fools and Horses)
13 April	Ronnie Carroll	80	Singer and UK Eurovision contestant (1962 and 1963)
20 April	Peter Howell	95	Actor (Emergency – Ward 10, Doctor Who, Scum)
28 April	Keith Harris	67	Ventriloquist (Orville the Duck)
30 April	Nigel Terry	69	Actor (Excalibur, War Requiem)

== May ==
Date	Name	Age	Broadcast credibility
2 May	Ruth Rendell	85	Author and novelist with Inspector Wexford and The Ruth Rendell Mysteries
13 May	Derek Davis	67	Broadcaster with BBC Northern Ireland and RTÉ
22 May	Terry Sue-Patt	50	Actor (Grange Hill)
30 May	Jake D'Arcy	69	Actor (Still Game)

== June ==
Date	Name	Age	Broadcast credibility
1 June	Charles Kennedy	55	Liberal Democrat leader and guest presenter of Have I Got News for You
5 June	Richard Johnson	87	Actor (Midsomer Murders, Waking the Dead, Silent Witness, Doc Martin)
7 June	Christopher Lee	93	Actor (Gormenghast, The Man with the Golden Gun)
11 June	Ron Moody	91	Actor
25 June	Patrick Macnee	93	Actor (The Avengers)
26 June	David McAlister	64	Actor (Hollyoaks)
30 June	Edward Burnham	98	Actor (Doctor Who, To Sir, with Love, The Abominable Dr. Phibes)

== July ==
Date	Name	Age	Broadcast credibility
1 July	Val Doonican	88	Singer and entertainer (Sunday Night at the Palladium, The Val Doonican Show)
10 July	Roger Rees	71	Actor and director (Cheers, Singles, The West Wing)
29 July	Peter O'Sullevan	97	Racing Commentator
30 July	Stuart Baggs	27	Candidate on The Apprentice

== August ==
Date	Name	Age	Broadcast credibility
1 August	Cilla Black	72	Singer and television presenter (Surprise Surprise, Blind Date, The Moment of Truth)
5 August	George Cole	90	Actor and voice actor (Minder, Cleopatra, My Good Friend, Mary Reilly, Dad, Tube Mice)
8 August	Susan Sheridan	68	Actress and voice artist (The Black Cauldron, The Hitchhiker's Guide to the Galaxy, Noddy's Toyland Adventures, Moomin)
8 August	David Nobbs	80	Comedy writer and humanist (The Two Ronnies, The Fall and Rise of Reginald Perrin, A Bit of a Do, Gentlemen's Relish)
9 August	Jack Gold	85	Film and television director (Escape from Sobibor, The Naked Civil Servant, The Rose and the Jackal, The Chain, Goodnight Mister Tom, Ball Trap on the Cote Sauvage, The Medusa Touch, Heavy Weather)
12 August	Stephen Lewis	88	Actor (On the Buses, Oh, Doctor Beeching!, Last of the Summer Wine)
15 August	Geraint Stanley Jones	79	Television executive, controller of BBC Wales (1981–1989), chief executive of S4C (1989–1994)
16 August	Kitty McGeever	48	Actress and comedian (Emmerdale, London's Burning)
25 August	Colin Fry	53	Television medium

== September ==
Date	Name	Age	Broadcast credibility
3 September	Judy Carne	76	Actress (Juke Box Jury, The Rag Trade, Marks in His Diary)
19 September	Brian Sewell	84	Writer, art critic and media personality
19 September	Jackie Collins	77	Actress, writer and romance novelist
22 September	Derek Ware	77	Actor and stuntman (Doctor Who)
27 September	John Guillermin	89	Film director, writer and producer (The Towering Inferno, King Kong, Death on the Nile, Sheena, King Kong Lives)

== October ==
Date	Name	Age	Broadcast credibility
7 October	William Mitchell	87	Writer and editor (Dalesman magazines)
8 October	Hugh Scully	72	Presenter (Antiques Roadshow)
8 October	Jim Diamond	64	Singer-songwriter (recorded the Boon theme tune, "Hi Ho Silver")
8 October	Richard Davies	89	Actor (Z-Cars, Please Sir!, Coronation Street)
9 October	Gordon Honeycombe	79	Newscaster (ITN News, TV-am)
9 October	Julia Jones	82	Television writer and former actress (Quiet as a Nun, Miss Marple, Wycliffe, Anne of Green Gables, Our Mutual Friend, Echoes, The Famous Five)
13 October	Sue Lloyd-Roberts	64	Television journalist (BBC News, Newsnight, ITN News)
17/18 October	Jacky Sutton	50	BBC journalist and producer, Iraq director for the Institute for War and Peace Reporting
22 October	Peter Baldwin	82	Actor (Coronation Street)
29 October	Kenneth Gilbert	84	Actor (Doctor Who, House of Cards)
30 October	Al Molinaro	96	Actor

== November ==
Date	Name	Age	Broadcast credibility
1 November	Stephen Hancock	89	Actor (Coronation Street)
3 November	Colin Welland	81	Actor and screenwriter (Z-Cars, Blue Remembered Hills)
14 November	Warren Mitchell	89	Actor (Till Death Us Do Part, Death of a Salesman)
15 November	Saeed Jaffrey	86	Actor (The Jewel in the Crown, Coronation Street)
18 November	Redvers Kyle	85	Broadcaster, voice over artist, actor and composer
20 November	Peter Dimmock	94	Sports journalist and BBC executive (Grandstand, BBC Sports Personality of the Year)
20 November	Keith Michell	88	Actor and director (The Six Wives of Henry VIII)
22 November	Hazel Adair	95	Writer and producer (Crossroads)
22 November	Robin Stewart	69	Actor (Bless This House, Cromwell, The Legend of the 7 Golden Vampires)
25 November	Beth Rogan	84	Actress (Mysterious Island)

== December ==
Date	Name	Age	Broadcast credibility
2 December	Anthony Valentine	76	Actor (Colditz, Coronation Street, Escape to Athena)
6 December	Nicholas Smith	81	Actor (Are You Being Served?, Grace & Favour, Doctor Who, Wallace & Gromit: The Curse of the Were-Rabbit)
7 December	Shirley Stelfox	74	Actor (Emmerdale, Keeping Up Appearances, Coronation Street) Edna Birch
15 December	Kathy Secker	70	Broadcaster and television presenter (Tyne Tees Television)
19 December	Jimmy Hill	87	Footballer, football manager and football pundit (Match of the Day)

== See also ==
- 2015 in British music
- 2015 in British radio
- 2015 in the United Kingdom
- List of British films of 2015
