= Hob (folklore) =

Household spirit

A hob is a type of small mythological household spirit found in the English Midlands, Northern England, (Note: J. C. Atkinson. "Hob". Cleveland Dialect. "The appellation of a spirit, or being of elf-nature, who must once have occupied a prominent place in the belief or popular faith of the people of the district." p. 262.) (Note: Harry J. Scott. Yorkshire. "In the moorland areas the farming community preserved their old customs ... Cut off from the outside world except for rare occasions, a supernatural world provided explanations ... There were many Hobs – which might be good or evil spirit ... A good Hob would help his master bring in the hay or cure an ailing pig ... A bad Hob would pester a man so that all went ill ... Good or bad, a self-respecting Hob would attach himself to a family and stay with them ...) and on the Anglo-Scottish border, according to traditional folklore of those regions. They could live inside the house or outdoors. They are said to work in farmyards and thus could be helpful; however if offended they could become nuisances. The usual way to dispose of hobs was to give them a set of new clothing, the receiving of which would make the creatures leave forever. It could, however, be impossible to get rid of the worst hobs.

== Etymology ==
‘Hob’ is a diminutive form of the name Robin, which is itself a diminutive form of the name Robert.

Hob is sometimes a generic term given to a goblin, bogle or brownie. The name Hob became associated with the mythical creature as ‘a piece of rude familiarity to cover up uncertainty or fear’; essentially, calling a mystical creature by a common nickname was a way to make the concept less frightening and the nickname eventually became the common term.

As well as the brownie, another cognate exists in the Scandinavian nisse or tomte; all are thought to be derived from the household gods of olden times, known in England as the cofgodas (Old English for ‘house-gods’), of which the brownie and hob are indeed a survival.

The term 'hob' is also linked in the north of England to the Old English þyrs and Old Norse þurs, meaning 'giant' or 'monster’. These roots give rise to dialectal variants such as hob-thrush, hob-thrust and hob-dross, recorded across Yorkshire, Lincolnshire and Derbyshire.

== Folklore ==
=== Yorkshire ===
Hobs have been described as small, hairy, wizened men. Hobs were viewed as kind but mischievous spirits, helpful to local people in need. One famous hob lived near Runswick Bay in a hobhole; this hob was believed to be able to cure young children of kink-cough (whooping cough). Parents would bring their ailing young to the hob's cave dwelling and recite the following:

Hobhole Hob!
Ma' bairn's gotten 't kink cough,
Tak't off ! tak't off!

Hobs are generally considered household spirits who preferred to be about at night. Hobs were not tied to a particular place but seemed to come and go as they chose. A hob would help the farmer in the field or the shopkeeper in his store. The householder had to be careful in dealing with a hob so as not to offend it. If a farmer were to speak poorly of a hob on his farm, the hob might retaliate by breaking dishes and turning loose livestock. Most importantly, a hob must not be given a gift of clothing, as this would be greatly resented and might cause a helpful hob to leave immediately.

A recurring motif in northern folklore is that when a hob is offered clothes—often a coarse shirt or hood—he vanishes, offended. This is often marked by a rhyme, such as: “Ha! a cap and a hood, / Hob’ll never do mair good.” (Sturfit Hall)

“Gin Hob mun hae nowght but a hardin’ hamp, / He’ll come nae mair nowther to berry nor stamp.” (Hart Hall, Glaisdale)

These couplets often signal the end of a hob’s aid, linking him to the wider European motif of the departing brownie or tomte.

=== North York Moors ===
==== Farndale flit ====
Farndale in the North York Moors is separated from its neighbour Rosedale to the east by a high but relatively level moorland promontory known as Blakey Ridge. On the east side of that ridge is a topographical feature known as Hobb Crag, overlooking the village of Rosedale Abbey. A local story relates how a farmer in Farndale was so troubled by a Hob that he decided to move to another farm – just to get rid of that Hob.

He loaded his cart with furniture and farm equipment and set off. On the way he met a neighbour who exclaimed, "What's thoo doin' George, flittin'?" And a voice from the churn called out, "Aye, lad, we're flittin'!" So the farmer turned his horse and cart round and went back to his farm, knowing that the hobgoblin would always be with him.

Note the local dialect word flittin (Note: J. C. Atkinson. "Flit". Cleveland Dialect . "1. To remove one's goods, household furniture, and gear generally, in the process of removing from one tenement or residence to another." p. 190.) which may be derived from the Old Norse language.

== Names and habitations ==
=== Names ===
==== Local name ====
"Hob-trush Hob ! Where is thou ? (Note: J.C.Atkinson – Cleveland Dialect < Hobtrush >..."Hobtrush Hob, a being once held to frequent a certain cave in the Mulgrave Woods......"he is supposed to haunt woods only : Hob o' t' hyrst...)
. . ."Ah's tying on mah left-fuit shoe;
An' Ah'll be wiv thee—Noo!"

— J.C.Atkinson – Cleveland Dialect.

It was customary for a local hob to have a local name and a local habitation. (Note: J.C.Atkinson – Cleveland Dialect < Hob >..."Probably, like the nisses of popular faith in Denmark, there were many Hobs, each with a local habitation and a local name...)

Some "Hob" names may suggest their mischievous personality:

- Jester
- Hobshaddow (Note: Harry J. Scott – Portrait of Yorkshire..."Good or bad, a self-respecting Hob would attach himself to a family and stay with them...)

==== Hobbe Hyrste ====
The name Hob-thrush may be derived from Hobbe Hyrste (Note: Charles Scott – The Devil and his Imps..."I suppose it to have been existent as early as 1489, at which date...Hobbe Hyrste...) or Hob o' t' hyrst – "Hob of the hurst". (Note: J.C.Atkinson – Cleveland Dialect < Hob >..."Certainly, it is not impossible that Hob-thrush, as well as Hob-thrust, may be a corruption of this assumed Hob o' t' hurst...)

1. Hob o' t' hyrst
2. Hob-t-hyrst
3. Hob-thyrst
4. Hob-thrust
5. Hob-thrush

See also WiKtionary : Old English < hyrst > ..."hurst, hillock, eminence, height, wood, wooded eminence".

The following names may be derived from Hobbe Hyrste:

Name	Habitation	Location
"Hob-trush"	Hob-trush Cave	Mulgrave woods, North Yorkshire.
"Hobthrush"	Obtrush Rook (Note: J.C.Atkinson – Cleveland Dialect < Hob >..."Hobt'rush Rook on the Farndale Moors...Obtrush Rook...)	Farndale, North Yorkshire.
"Hobthrush"	Hobthrush's Isle	St Cuthbert's Isle (Hobthrush), Northumberland.
"Hob Hurst"	Hob Hurst's House	Hob Hurst's House, Beeley Moor, Derbyshire.

Similar names are found in disparate parts of the country – it is possible that these were introduced by migrant workers while moving between employments, especially those involved with mining and railway construction.

=== Habitations ===
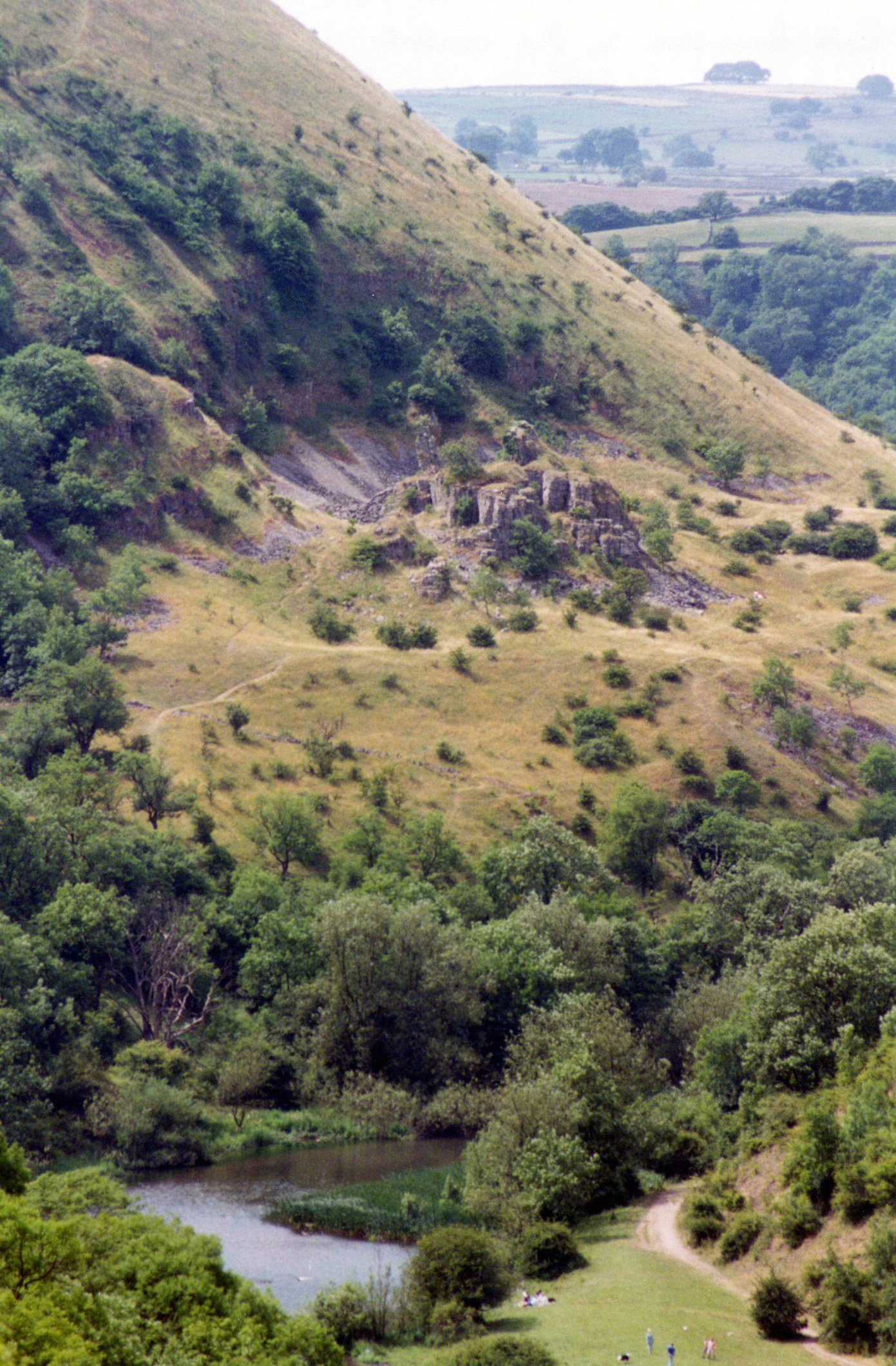
Hob's House Cave, Monsal Dale, Derbyshire.

The habitation was usually a topographical feature, such as a hill, crag, hole, cave or island.

Often the feature would be within view of the farm or local settlement:

Habitation	Settlement
Hobb Hill	Bloxham near Banbury.
Hobb Crag	Rosedale Abbey
Hobthrush Isle	Holy Island

==== Hob Hole ====
WiKtionary: The name element hole might relate to:

1. English < hole > ..."A hollow place or cavity; an excavation; a pit; a dent; a depression; a fissure".
2. Old Norse < hóll > ..."hill, hillock, knoll".

Habitation	Location
Hob Hole (Note: J.C.Atkinson – Cleveland Dialect < Hob >..."Thus there is a Hob Hole at Runswick, a Hob Hole near Kempswithen...)	Calais Beck south of Runswick Bay, North Yorkshire.
Hob Hole	Hob Hole Beck near Kempswithen, Kildale Moor, Eskdale, North Yorkshire.
Hobbs Hole	Hobbs Hole Farm near Great Tew, Oxfordshire.

==== Tumuli ====
It was common for Hob place names to be associated with tumuli:

Habitation	Location	Listed
Hobthrush Rook (Note: Historic England..."Obtrusch round cairn was originally known as Hobthrush Rook...)	Farndale, North Yorkshire.	Two round cairns
Hob on the Hill	Commondale Moor, North Yorkshire.	Wayside cross Round barrows
Hob Hurst's House	Beeley Moor, Derbyshire.	Square tumulus

== Legacy ==
=== Place names ===
==== Yorkshire place names ====
Many topographical features, especially in North Yorkshire, are named "Hobs". (Note: Harry J. Scott – Portrait of Yorkshire..."This may explain why you will so frequently find "Hob" place names in Cleveland...) Dickins provides dozens of attested hob place-names across Northern England, many associated with barrows, springs, or moorlands.

Place name	Link	Location	Area	Feature	Map (Note: MAGiC MaP – Help: 1. Use Table of Contents for Colour mapping.; 2. There may be intermittent problems with the magic.defra.gov.uk website, if so then try again another time.)	Latitude N – S
Hob Hill		The Fairy Glen, Saltburn-by-the-Sea. (Note: Hob Hill is above a deep river gorge known locally as The Fairy Glen.)	North Yorkshire	Hill		520200
Hob Hole	Hob Hole	Calais Beck south of Runswick Bay.	North York Moors	Hole		515500
Hob on the Hill	Tumuli	Between Guisborough and Commondale. (Note: Hob on the Hill is the meeting point for three parish boundaries: East – LOCKWOOD CP; West – GUISBOROUGH CP; South – COMMONDALE CP)	North York Moors	Cross		512420
Hob-trush Cave	Name	Mulgrave woods (Note: The exact location of the cave, if one exists, is not known. The grid reference is for the Norman Castle in Mulgrave woods.)	North Yorkshire	Cave		511700
Hobshaddow Wood	Name	Between Hutton Rudby and Stokesley.	North Yorkshire	Wood		508300
Hob Hole Beck	Hob Hole	South of Kempswithen (Kildale moor) near Castleton, Eskdale. (Note: Hob Hole Beck is upstream from Dibble Bridge)	North York Moors	Hole		507800
Hobb Crag	Habitat	West of Rosedale Abbey, Rosedale.	North York Moors	Crag		495400
Hobthrush Rook	Name	Farndale, North Yorkshire.	North York Moors	Tumulus		494400

==== Scotland – England ====
Place name	Link	Location	Area	Feature	Map	Latitude N – S
Hobthrush	Name	Lindisfarne	Northumberland	Islet		641600
Hobkirk		South-east of Hawick	Scottish Borders	Church		610900
Hobb's Flow		Anglo-Scottish border near Kielder Forest	Northumberland	Wetland		590100
Hobroyd		Whitfield, Glossop.	Derbyshire	Wood		393200
Hob Hill		Whitfield, Glossop.	Derbyshire	Hill		392800
Hob's House Cave		Monsal Dale	Derbyshire	Cave		371300
Hob Hurst's House	Tumuli	Beeley Moor near Chatsworth House	Derbyshire	Tumulus		369200
Hob Hall; Hob Wood		South of Wirksworth	Derbyshire	Croft; Wood		352700
Jester's Hill	Name	Shutford near Banbury. (Note: Jester's Hill is 2.5 miles (4.0 km) north-west of Hobb Hill, Bloxham.)	Oxfordshire	Hill		239500
Hobb Hill	Habitat	Bloxham near Banbury.	Oxfordshire	Hill		236600
Hobb's Hole	Hob Hole	Hobbs Hole Farm near Great Tew.	Oxfordshire	Hole		229100
Hobbard's Hill		North-west of Wootton-by-Woodstock.	Oxfordshire	Hill		220400
Hobb's Hill		Hobb's Hill tin mine, Bodmin Moor.	Cornwall	Hill		069400

=== Notable people ===
- Hobhouse is a rare English family name, belonging originally to a Somerset family.
- The Scottish national hero Robert the Bruce was known as King Hobbe by his English enemy. (Note: Ian Crofton. Walking the Border. "Hobb was formerly a familiar name for anyone called Robert or Robin. The English soldiery gave the nickname 'King Hobbe' to Robert the Bruce and sang rather a rude song about him in Middle English. ... Hob was also the name of Robin Goodfellow, the mischievous sprite also known as Puck. Robin Goodfellow was associated with Will-o'-the-wisp, the pale flares of marsh gas sometime seen in boggy areas at night.")

=== Modern popular culture ===
- The 1958 TV serial Quatermass and the Pit, and the later film version, centre around the fictional Hobbs Lane (formerly called Hob's Lane), the significance of the name becoming apparent as the plot unfolds.
- In Jim Butcher's The Dresden Files, hobs are eyeless creatures who burn in light. They serve the Queen Mab of the Winter Court of the Sidhe.
- In Lionhead Studios' video games Fable, Fable II, and Fable III some of the minor adversaries are creatures known as "hobbes". They are created from children who misbehave and are captured by hobbes.
- In J. K. Rowling's Harry Potter series, house-elves (such as Harry's friend Dobby) appear to be a type of hob, doing household tasks for human masters and driven from their households if given gifts of clothing (in what most house-elves see as a type of shameful expulsion, but the eccentric Dobby – and several human observers – consider an emancipation from slavery).
- The Hob appearing in The Years of Longdirk by Ken Hood is considerably different from the traditional depiction, being a powerful spirit which is amoral, neither good nor bad, but which has considerable destructive powers it can use if provoked. In Hood's fantasy world, "Hob" and "Imp" are two names for much the same kind of being.
- In The Hob's Bargain by Patricia Briggs, the Hob is a powerful creature, possibly the last of his kind, who bargains to help protect a local village from a necromancer in exchange for a mate. The heroine who brought the Hob to the village agrees to his bargain in exchange for his help.
- In Moonshine, the second novel of the Cal Leandros novels by Rob Thurman, the villain is "Hobgoblin" or "the Hob", the oldest of the race of immortal creatures known as pucks. In this series, the pucks all look alike, with curly brown hair, green eyes, and "foxlike" faces. Unlike his fellow puck, Robin Goodfellow, the Hob sees humans merely as toys and tools, beings which are utterly beneath him.
- In An Elder Scrolls Novel: The Infernal City, hobs are used as kitchen slaves.
- In Richard Dawson's 2017 album Peasant, a song titled "Hob" tells the story of a family's encounter with a hobthrust.
- In Travis Baldree's book Legends & Lattes, the main character hires a hob as a carpenter in her coffee shop, noting that they are disparagingly referred to as 'pucks' by humans and are not often seen in cities.

== See also ==
- Hobbit
- Hobgoblin
- Lubber fiend, also known as "Lob".

== General and cited sources ==
- Atkinson, John Christopher (1868). A Glossary of the Cleveland Dialect (1st ed.). London: J. R. Smith.
- Crofton, Ian (2014). Walking the Border: A Journey Between Scotland and England. Birlinn. ISBN 978-1-78027-207-8.
- Dickins, Bruce (1942), ‘Yorkshire Hobs’, Transaction of the Yorkshire Dialect Society 7, 9-23.
- Scott, Charles P. G. (1895). "The Devil and His Imps: An Etymological Inquisition". Transactions of the American Philological Association. 26: 79–146. doi:10.2307/2935696. JSTOR 2935696.
- Scott, Harry J. (1965). Portrait of Yorkshire. Portrait Books. London: Robert Hale Limited. OCLC 2898758. Linked version is the 1977 second edition.
