= Derbyshire moors =

The Derbyshire moors are moorlands in the English county of Derbyshire, and form the southern part of the Peak District.

They include:

- Beeley Moor (SK290700)
- East Moor (SK290700)
- Brampton East Moor
- Gibbet Moor (SK270760)
- Harewood Moor (SK300670)
