= Settle Stories =

Charity founded in 2011

- Founded: 2010 by Sita Brand
- Registration no.: 1141649
- Purpose: Storytelling, Oral history
- Location: Settle, England
- Coordinates: 54.068670°N 2.276310°W
- Region served: Yorkshire
- Website: www.settlestories.org.uk

Settle Stories is a registered charity and company founded in 2011 by Sita Brand, following the running of the Settle Storytelling Festival in 2010. The charity seeks to promote storytelling for individuals, communities and organisations.

== History ==
In 2010, Sita Brand, a performance storyteller, theatre director, writer, and producer, established the first Settle Storytelling Festival in Settle, a small market town in North Yorkshire. The aims of the festival were:

1. To increase access to traditional and modern forms of storytelling.
2. To improve the storytelling skills of users.
3. To increase the availability of, access to, and diversity of stories and storytelling.

At the core of the initiative was a belief by Brand in the power of storytelling to help people learn and communicate universal truths. Brand believes that stories ignite the imagination in ways that help people to listen, learn, make emotional connections with ideas and effectively communicate with others. She also saw the festival as a way of contributing to the economic development of the market town.

Funding was obtained from the Arts Council England, with additional contributions from Craven District Council, Settle Town Council. The first Settle Storytelling Festival was successfully launched in 2010, involving professional storytellers, musicians and other artists. Over 500 people attended, with a similar number of local children taking part in schools-based workshops.

Following the success of the 2010 festival, Settle Stories became a registered charity (registered charity no.1141649). Subsequent festivals in each of the following years saw a steady increase in visitors, with over 1,000 attending the 2013 event. The festival has since grown to become the largest storytelling festival in the north of England with over 70 events in 2018.

In June 2011, Settle Stories established the W R Mitchell Archive, which is a unique collection of audio and visual recordings of life in the North West of England, particularly the Yorkshire Dales. The charity is now in the process of digitising the material and making it available as a resource for learning (see below).

In 2018, Settle Stories established The Joinery, a venue and creative space for users to meet, create and share arts work,

The company is funded by Arts Council, Heritage Lottery Fund, Settle Town Council, Trusts and Foundations, commercial sponsors and individuals.

The company continues to innovate and has developed a number of digital projects including a live streamed events. and Interactive Fiction. In 2019 the company created the world's first Listening Gallery in a BT heritage phone box.

In 2019 they worked with Shanthamani Muddaiah to create a new work Life in our Hands.

== W R Mitchell Archive ==
The W R Mitchell Archive is a collection of oral history recordings, photographs and other materials collected by W. R. Mitchell over a 60-year period to record the history of Yorkshire, Cumbria and Lancashire.

Mitchell (Bill) (1928 - 2015) was a journalist, historian, and author of over 100 books and articles on the Yorkshire Dales. He joined The Dalesman magazine in 1948 and was its editor from 1968–88. From the 1980s onward, Bill toured the region recording on cassette tape the memories of local people on a wide range of topics, but particularly the everyday experiences of people, as remembered and told by Dales people in their own words and dialects. In 1996, in recognition of his work, he was awarded the MBE and was made an honorary Doctor of Letters by the University of Bradford.

By 2010, Dr Mitchell had amassed a collection of over 300 audio tapes, with an accompanying collection of photographs and some video footage, of his interviewees.

In January 2012, Settle Stories received a £50,000 Heritage Lottery Fund Grant for a pilot project to digitise a selection of cassette tapes and make the recordings available online.

The archive continues with the support of volunteers.
