= Harry J. Scott =

- Born: Henry John Athelson Scott; 23 July 1901; Stonehouse, Plymouth
- Died: 12 January 1978 (aged 76); Grange-over-Sands, Cumbria
- Resting place: Clapham, North Yorkshire
- Occupations: Editor, writer, publisher

Henry John Athelson Scott (23 July 1901 – 12 January 1978) was founding editor of the Dalesman magazine, in Yorkshire, northern England. He established the journal, originally called The Yorkshire Dalesman, from the front room of his cottage in Clapham, North Yorkshire, in 1939. He remained editor, then managing director, of The Dalesman and sister magazine Cumbria until his death in 1978, aged 76. In the meantime The Dalesman grew to become Britain's best-selling regional magazine. Scott was also an early BBC royal correspondent. During the late 1930s he described a number of royal visits to the north of England for broadcast on the BBC's Northern Programme. Later in his career he wrote a number of books about his beloved Yorkshire and his business became a prolific publisher of books in the North of England.

== Early life and career ==
Harry J. Scott was born in 1901 in Stonehouse, Plymouth, to a Quaker family. Moving north when he was very young, the Scotts moved first to Manchester then later to Hyde Park, Leeds. Scott originally wanted to be an architect but the cost of training proved prohibitive, so it was decided he should become an accountant. However, soon realising he preferred words to numbers, he took a job as a newspaper reporter at the Yorkshire Evening Post, then the Yorkshire Post. The young journalist married Dorothy Wise in Leeds in 1928 and the couple had two children, Martin and Margaret. Harry and Dorothy left the city for the countryside each summer, renting part of a farm in the Washburn Valley. They never had a car and Scott would walk into Otley before catching the bus to Leeds for work. During these extended stays in the countryside, Harry began jotting down details of life in the Dales - the stories of the folk who lived there and the customs and traditions they maintained. He kept these notes in a shoebox, thinking they may come in useful one day.

Sure his future lay away from the city, Scott travelled to Burford to meet J. W. Robertson Scott, editor of countryside quarterly Countryman (magazine). He didn't take the job on offer there, because he preferred the countryside of the North to the Cotswolds. However, perhaps inspired by this trip, Scott began considering publishing a countryside magazine of his own, about the Yorkshire Dales. In 1934 he quit his job at the Yorkshire Post and became a freelance. Leaving the city behind, he rented a cottage in Clapham, which he renamed Fellside, and continued to work for a number of newspapers, including the Yorkshire Post, Yorkshire Evening Post, Leeds Mercury and Lancashire Evening Post, on a freelance basis. He reckoned if he could earn £3 a week this way he could pay his way.

As well as writing for various newspapers Scott tried his hand at broadcast journalism. He was handed the prestigious task of commentating on royal visits to the north for the fledgling BBC which had only been broadcasting for some 10 years. Between 1937 and 1939 he provided eye-witness accounts of visits by George VI to Yorkshire, Lancashire and County Durham. The Sheffield Independent of Thursday 14 October 1937 reported: "The BBC has arranged for an observer to follow the King and Queen as they tour the West Riding next Tuesday, Wednesday and Thursday. Three eye-witness accounts will be given by Mr Harry J Scott, a Yorkshire journalist, from 10.25 to 10.30 each night." He also occasionally broadcast to the nation. On 17 September 1938 he co-presented an evening programme called "Saturday Talk on Sport" on BBC National radio. The subject was Sheep Dog Trials.

== The Dalesman ==
In 1939 Scott showed his shoebox full of stories from the Dales to six friends, including Linton Andrews, editor of the Leeds Mercury. They each loaned him £50, and so The Yorkshire Dalesman was born.

From the front room of Fellside, the first edition of the magazine's 28 pages were pulled together. They were hand-set and printed by Lamberts of Settle. Some 3,000 copies of the April 1939 edition were printed at a cost of £25. Famous contributors who wrote in that first issue included J.B. Priestley and Willie Riley. Harry Scott carefully crafted that small-format magazine, introducing features such as "A Yorkshire Dalesman's Diary" and "Readers' Club" which survive to this day.

The publication proved an immediate success, receiving glowing reviews in the Yorkshire press." But the declaration of war in September of that year threatened to scupper the Dalesman before it had even properly begun. Harry Scott took the brave decision to carry on publishing. A columnist in the Leeds Mercury wrote in October 1939: "Anyone who knows The Yorkshire Dalesman will be glad that its editor, Mr. Harry J. Scott, has courageously decided to continue publication in war-time as a reminder of good things still alive in the world. This little 3d. monthly, with its photographs and drawings and its sketches of country life and character will bring the comforting thought of the Dales to many in need of relief from war duties and anxieties. It is easily packed, and I hope that it reaches many a Yorkshire unit in France. If it does it will be eagerly passed round."

Harry Scott managed to keep the magazine published throughout the Second World War but plans to expand had to be put on hold and the size and circulation of the magazines was severely restricted.

Production of the Dalesman became a cottage industry in Clapham, with various villagers helping stuff envelopes and other administrative tasks. Money was tight and Scott took a job as sub editor at the Craven Herald & Pioneer It was here, in 1943, that he met a young W. R. Mitchell, on his first day as a trainee reporter. Mitchell often recalled how Scott's memorable first words of greeting were "Hail to thee, blithe spirit!" Mitchell would later become his assistant at the Dalesman, then eventually take his place in the editor's chair.

Once the war ended, with paper restrictions lifted, Scott was finally able to implement his expansion plans. More pages were added, and more copies printed. Scott was also able to move into book production. Dalesman published a number of small books each year from 1946 onwards, the first written by Arthur Raistrick, while Scott wrote his own first book the same year - The Changeless Dale, published by Blandford Press.

As part of the expansion of his magazine, Scott changed the name of The Yorkshire Dalesman to The Dalesman and increased its area of coverage to include not just the Dales, but all the Yorkshire countryside, including the moors and coast. Always keen to innovate he also introduced the magazine's first full colour picture in 1946 - a painting by local artist Fred Lawson.

In 1948, Scott hired W. R. (Bill) Mitchell, in a stroke doubling the staff of The Dalesman. That year Scott also began publishing a second magazine, the Northern Review, covering the whole of the North of England, but it never emulated the success of The Dalesman and was soon merged with its sister title. In 1951, another acquisition proved to have more longevity. Following a meeting with the Youth Hostel Association in the North West he agreed to take on publication of their irregular publication Cumbria. Scott turned the magazine monthly and it remains a sister title to Dalesman to this day.

By 1955, The Dalesman's circulation had reached 25,000 copies, and it was finally decided the business had outgrown the Scotts' front room at Fellside and new, much bigger, premises were acquired elsewhere in Clapham in the summer of 1955.

== Retirement ==
Scott officially retired as editor of The Dalesman in the summer of 1969, left day-to-day operations some four years earlier. His long-standing assistant Mitchell took over as editor, while Scott remained on board as managing director. He and Dorothy took semi-retirement, moving from Clapham to Grange-over-Sands, in Cumbria, from where he would hold monthly management meetings with Mitchell and other senior staff. Scott retired leaving The Dalesman in fine fettle. Its circulation had grown above 60,000 and the magazine was read all over the world.

Harry J. Scott died on 12 January 1978. Mitchell wrote shortly after: "He remained, to the end, an unassuming man. His love of people shone through all his utterances and writings. I saw him on the day before he died, at his home in Grange-over-Sands, overlooking the restless tides and magnificent sunsets of Morecambe Bay. He was delighted to be reassured that The Dalesman, his creation, would continue along the general lines he first prescribed nearly 40 years ago." Mitchell listed Scott's achievements and noted that "he had become something of a legend in the world of rural journalism." Scott's ashes were scattered in his beloved Clapham.

== Bibliography ==
All non fiction.

• Countryside Character 1946 (Contributor) (Blandford Press)

• The Changeless Dale 1946 (Blandford Press)

• Portrait of Yorkshire 1965 (Robert Hale Ltd)

• Yorkshire Landmarks 1967 (Dalesman Publishing Company Ltd)

• Yorkshire Heritage 1970 (Robert Hale Ltd)

• View of Yorkshire 1975 (Robert Hale Ltd)

• Yorkshire 1977 (Robert Hale Ltd)

• Yorkshire Tales and Legends 1990 (Dalesman Publishing Company Ltd)
