= Shanthamani Muddaiah =

Indian sculptor

- Born: 1967 (age 58–59); Mysore, Karnataka, India
- Occupation: Sculptor
- Years active: From 1984
- Known for: Sculpture and installation artist
- Notable work: www.shanthamani.com

Shanthamani Muddaiah is a sculptural artist who uses ephemeral natural materials in her visual art work such as paper and charcoal to create, install and display exhibits. Her sculptures have been exhibited in many biennial art shows in India and at many international centers. She has received many awards for her works.

== Biography ==
Muddaiah was born in Mysore, Karnataka in 1967. She graduated with a Bachelor of Fine Arts (BFA) in Painting from Chamarajendra Academy of Visual Arts, Mysore. Following this, she obtained her Master of Fine Arts (MFA) degree in painting from the M. S. University Baroda. She studied for one year in 2004 for a course in paper-making under the fellowship of the Charles Wallace Scholarship in Glasgow, Scotland. She has also received the National Junior Fellowship from Ministry of Tourism and Culture, New Delhi for 2006–08.

== Work and Exhibits ==
The sculpture titled Backbone made of cement and luminous cinder in the form of a large spinal column was exhibited at the Kochi-Muziris Biennale in 2014. It measured 7x5x70 ft sculpted in the shape of a meandering river. The inspiration for this art work came from her three months tour along the meandering Ganges river during 2010, and is considered a metaphor as the "backbone of our culture". Muddaiah also said that an anesthesia injection to her spine when in labour gave her the idea for the sculpture. Jitish Kallat, the curator of the Kochi-Muziris Biennale 2014 where the sculpture was displayed in Kochi said it is "as if some long gone history is invoked in the form of this seemingly unearthed fossil" and that "the use of volcanic rock like cinder is especially very interesting as the porous surface of the material bears some geological traces, and itself appears like fossils".

Another notable sculpture is titled Metamorphosis Favourite which is a sculpture of pupa that represents the evolution stage between the pupa and the butterfly. It is made from charcoal of wood and pulp of cotton rags. It is suggestive of "decay, morbidity and death".

Over the years, some of her other sculptural exhibits are the Frozen Phoenix, Silent Speak, Gestures Speak and Turning wheel -Tradition unbound in India and Sri Lanka. Her sculptures are permanent exhibits at the Venkatappa Art Gallery, of the Karnataka State Museum, Bangalore. Her works are also part of many private galleries.

In 2019 she collaborated with Settle Stories and people of the Yorkshire Dales to create a new work Life in our Hands which was a video record of conversations with locals about the life and the history of the Craven district where also created images of the participants' hands through the technique of plaster casting. In the same year, she also came up with another sculpture Drop. A visualization of a single drop of ink that is frozen in the moment it touches the ground, it was the memorialization of the significance of each drop. Muddaiah said that the sculpture arose out of her journey from the beginning to the mouth of the river Ganga where she witnessed millions of people offering Arghya (Hindu ritual of offering water to a deity). Seeing them cupping hands full of water and offering them back to the river made her see the allegory in the cyclical nature of life.
