= Pottery Cottage murders =

1977 crime in England

- Pottery Cottage, pictured following the arrival of Derbyshire Constabulary at the premises, 14 January 1977
- Date: 12–14 January 1977
- Location: Pottery Cottage, Eastmoor, Chesterfield, England; 53°14′16.8″N 1°32′47.4″W
- Deaths: Pottery Cottage: Amy Minton (67); Arthur Minton (72); Richard Moran (41); Sarah Moran (10); Rainow: William Hughes (30) (perpetrator)
- Injuries: 4 (2 seriously)

The Pottery Cottage murders were a series of murders committed in Eastmoor, Chesterfield, between 12 and 14 January 1977. The murders occurred after William Thomas Hughes escaped from custody whilst being transferred from prison to court to face charges of rape and grievous bodily harm. Hughes stabbed two prison officers during his escape before holding a family of five hostage at Pottery Cottage for over two days, ultimately murdering four members of the family.

Hughes was shot dead by police marksmen after a high-speed, multiple-vehicle pursuit on 14 January. He was the first person to be shot dead by Derbyshire Constabulary and the first prison escapee to be shot dead in the United Kingdom in modern times. Chief Inspector Peter Howse was later awarded the Queen's Commendation for Brave Conduct for his role in apprehending Hughes and saving the life of the sole survivor.

== Background ==
=== William Hughes ===
William Hughes

William Thomas Hughes was born on 8 August 1946 in Preston, Lancashire. He was the first of six children born to Thomas Hughes and his wife Mary. Hughes had little interest in his education; his academic performance was poor and he was prone to antisocial behaviour and petty criminality from a young age, being first arrested upon a charge of theft at the age of fourteen. (Note: This would prove to be the first of 21 criminal charges Hughes received in his lifetime.) He failed to hold down a job for any lasting duration after leaving school at age 15. Hughes' escalating criminal behaviour resulted in spells in approved school and, later, borstal. He received the first of multiple prison sentences in 1966. As the majority of his criminal offences involved violence, he gradually earned the nickname "Mad Billy".

In 1972, Hughes married his fiancée, Jean Nadin; a Blackpool native and mother-of-one whom he initially proposed to while incarcerated at HMP Walton. The couple initially resided close to Blackpool's Golden Mile and had one daughter, Nichola (b. 6 August 1972), although they frequently changed addresses, in part due to Hughes' reluctance to pay landlords' rent charges. Initially, the couple's relationship was harmonious, although their relationship gradually became beset with neglect, abuse, violence and infidelity, and his wife saw little of him. The following year, he was sentenced to three-and-a-half years' imprisonment, having been convicted of four counts assault causing actual bodily harm for violently assaulting two police officers who had stopped his car and discovered a cache of drugs in the vehicle's boot, and assaulting two other officers as he violently resisted arrest following a brief chase. He was released from custody in early 1976.

Hughes abandoned his wife and child in March 1976; he later moved to Chesterfield with his girlfriend, Teresa O'Doherty. Five months later, on the night of 21 August, he followed a young couple whom he had met in a nightclub to a local park where he beat the man about the head with a brick, rendering him unconscious, before proceeding to drag his partner to a nearby riverbank where he raped her at knifepoint.

Following a public appeal, police received an anonymous tip-off and Hughes was duly arrested, charged and remanded to HMP Leicester on 27 August. He initially corresponded with O'Doherty on a frequent basis from this prison, although shortly after his incarceration, O'Doherty terminated their relationship and relocated to a separate address in Chesterfield. As such, subsequent letters penned by Hughes to O'Doherty were unanswered.

Despite his extensive history of violent behaviour, Hughes was categorized as a Category B inmate and allocated work in the prison kitchen from where, on 3 December 1976, he stole a seven-and-a-half-inch boning knife which he managed to keep concealed inside a small, fine tear he had carved in the base of his mattress despite subsequent searches for the utensil.

During his imprisonment at HMP Leicester, Hughes did not display any unusual behaviour or give any cause for concern. Although a report on Hughes was published which stated he was "of a violent nature" and may attempt to escape, this, along with the full record of Hughes' previous convictions, did not arrive at HMP Leicester until after his escape and the subsequent events to unfold. (Note: During the official Prison Service inquiry into Hughes' escape, officials discovered that the police had provided HMP Leicester with minimal information about Hughes and that Prison Service Headquarters had not furnished them with a comprehensive record of his previous convictions or his prior custodial history. As such, the department responsible for categorizing prisoners designated him as a Category B inmate—non-dangerous and a low escape risk.)

=== Pottery Cottage family ===
The entrance sign to Pottery Cottage

Arthur Minton (b. 2 March 1904, Solihull) and his wife Doris Amy (née Aubrey; b. 28 July 1909, Chesterfield) had married in June 1931. The couple had two daughters, Barbara (b. 1936) and Gillian Ann. The Mintons ran a grocery shop in School Lane, Acocks Green until Arthur's retirement. Shortly after selling their business, the couple relocated from the West Midlands to Derbyshire, sharing a home with their younger daughter Gillian and her husband, Richard Moran. The two families lived in separate sections of the household separated by a sliding door.

Richard Moran (b. 19 May 1935, Kilmoganny, Ireland) was born to a single mother. As a baby, he was fostered by a local Catholic family, whom he remained close to for his entire life. Moran left school at the age of 14 and started his working life as a labourer. He later served in the Irish Army via voluntary National Service. Shortly thereafter, Moran followed his foster sister, Margaret Hawe, to Birmingham, where he initially worked in a factory whilst studying in the evenings, later securing a role as a sales clerk with a local building company.

Gillian Moran (née Minton, b. 24 March 1938, Birmingham) was raised in Acocks Green. Upon leaving school, she enrolled in a secretarial college before working as a typist and delivery driver. Via this role, she first encountered Richard Moran in June 1958; the two were engaged by the following autumn, and married on 21 September 1959. Upon discovering they were unable to conceive, the couple chose to adopt a baby girl in 1966; the adoption was completed on 14 April 1967. Richard and Gillian named their daughter (b. 20 September 1966) Sarah Bridget. The child was raised in a loving and considerate household.

At the time their paths crossed with William Hughes, Richard worked as a sales director for a Chesterfield-based plastics manufacturing firm named Brett Plastics; Gillian worked as a secretary for a firm of accountants (also in Chesterfield); and Sarah was a content child and excellent student at her local primary school. The Mintons were both retired, although Amy did perform cleaning work at a neighbouring home twice weekly to supplement the family income.

== 12 January 1977 ==
=== Spouse threats ===
Shortly after 7 a.m. on 12 January 1977, Hughes made a phone call to O'Doherty from the landing of HMP Leicester. In this phone call, he taunted his former lover by whispering "No-one with you, I hope" before alluding to her efforts to evade him by changing her address—sarcastically revealing he had duped a "directory enquiries lady" into providing him with her new address.

Despite this revelation, O'Doherty sternly informed Hughes their relationship was over. Although Hughes rebuffed her subsequent insistence he serve his potentially-imposed sentence and return to his wife and child, when O'Doherty refused to appear as a character witness to "put a word in" on his behalf at a scheduled court appearance later that day, he briefly pleaded with her, claiming she was "all [he had] in the world" before becoming enraged as she terminated the phone call, stating: "You fucking bitch! You'd better lock your fucking doors!" He then calmly entered the prison kitchen to perform his assigned work duty of washing cutlery.

=== Escape ===
Later that morning, Hughes was driven from the prison to appear at Chesterfield Magistrates Court for a scheduled remand hearing. Hughes was transported to Chesterfield via taxi, accompanied by prison officers Donald Sprintall and Kenneth Simmonds; he was frisked, handcuffed to Simmonds and placed in the back seat of the taxicab, with Sprintall sitting in the front passenger seat. The method of handcuffing Hughes meant that, although he was handcuffed to another officer, he had one hand free. (Note: This was not the first occasion Hughes had been transferred to court via taxi; he had made the same journey on four previous occasions since being remanded into custody, having been described as "no cause for [security] concern" by his previous escorts.)

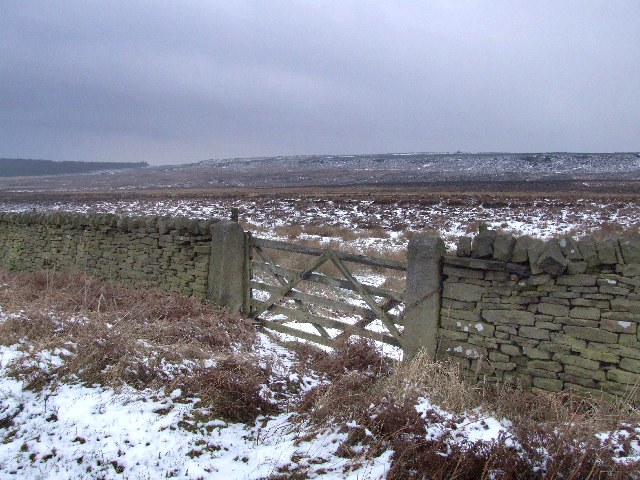
Beeley Moor

General weather conditions were poor on this date: heavy snow had recently fallen and general traffic flow along the 55-mile route was hindered by the elements. Initially, Hughes engaged in small talk with the officers, although at a location between Junctions 25 and 26 of the M1 motorway, Hughes insisted that he needed to use the bathroom. The prison officers allowed the vehicle to pull into a service station, where Hughes used the opportunity to discreetly retrieve the stolen boning knife he had hidden on his person before allowing himself to again be handcuffed to Simmonds.

Shortly after the journey restarted, Hughes attacked both prison officers inside the vehicle. He first attacked Sprintall, stabbing him in the back of the neck and narrowly missing his spine, (Note: Sprintall would later reflect: "The blow hit me with such force I thought we had been hit from behind by a lorry.") before turning his attention to Simmonds, whom he slashed across the jaw and hand. After incapacitating the prison officers and forcing Sprintall to provide the handcuffs as he held a knife to his throat, Hughes forced the taxi driver, David Reynolds, to continue driving at knifepoint along the A617 for a short distance before dumping him and the badly injured officers at the roadside and commandeering the vehicle.

Hughes proceeded to drive for only a short distance before crashing the car into a wall along the B5057 and fleeing on foot onto Beeley Moor. The vehicle was discovered abandoned close to Chatsworth House approximately one hour later.

=== Initial police search ===
Police were notified of Hughes' escape at approximately 10 a.m.; the crashed taxi Hughes had been travelling in was located within the hour. The immediate search was led by Chief Inspector Peter Howse. At the scene, the police dogs were unable to pick up a scent, the heavy snowfall had already concealed any footprints and there were no witnesses to the crash itself as the roads were largely deserted due to the harsh climate. A search radius was immediately established to encompass isolated local properties, farms and outbuildings. Initial available resources were insufficient to thoroughly search every property in the area; as such, police focused on the most vulnerable, 256 of which were checked in the first few hours, to no avail.

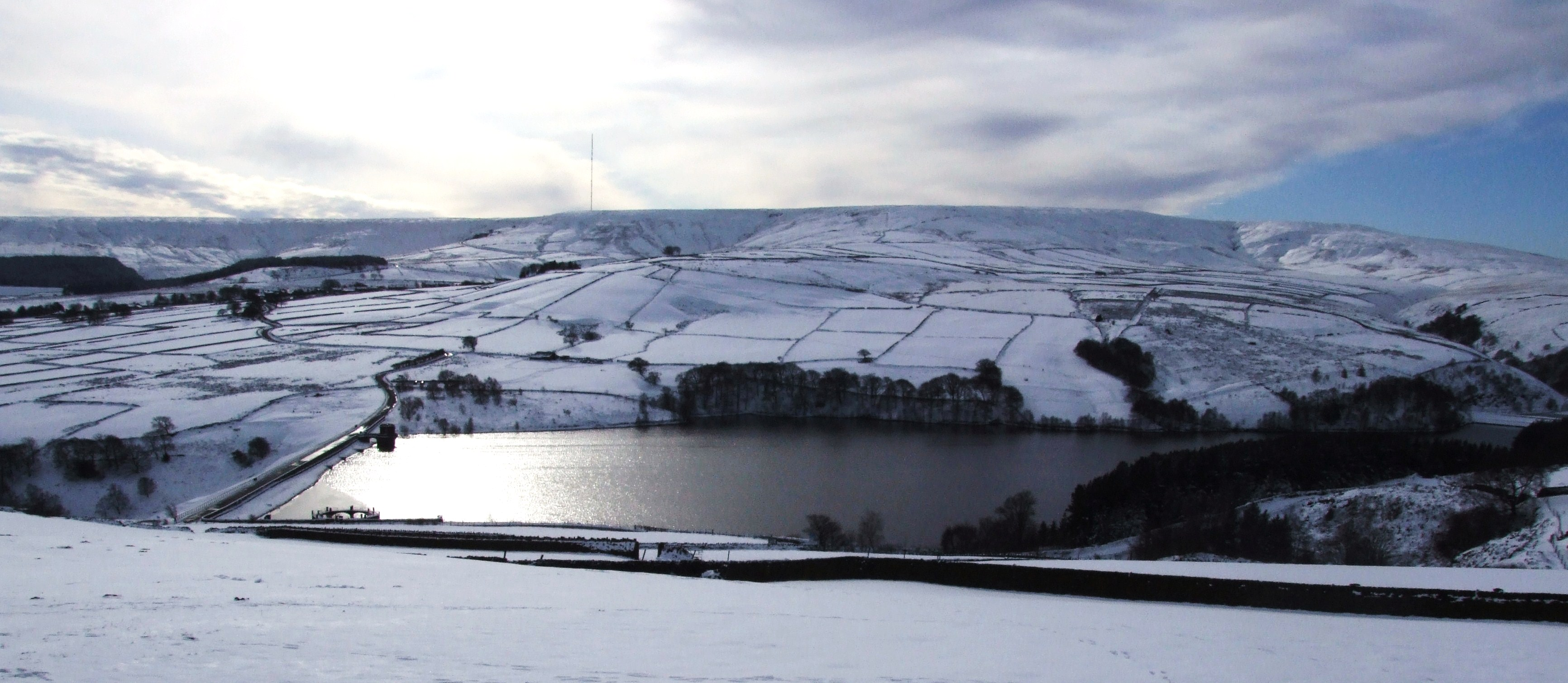
The Peak District in winter. Hughes crossed several miles of similar terrain following his escape from custody before sighting Pottery Cottage

Investigators believed the most likely scenario pertaining to Hughes' movements to be that he would continue towards Beeley, ultimately desiring to reach the A6, and unlikely that he would have headed onto the vast, open moors in such treacherous conditions. However, Hughes had done exactly that, making his way over four miles of exposed moorland amidst a fierce blizzard, heading north across frozen fells until—approximately two hours later—he reached Baslow Road, Eastmoor, close to the A619 road. One of the first residences he will have undoubtedly seen would have been Pottery Cottage.

=== Pottery Cottage ===
Northend Farm was a converted 18th century pottery barn on the edge of the Peak District National Park in Eastmoor. The property had been converted into three homes, with the Moran and Minton families having moved into one end of the property in October 1969 from a more modern residence in the village of Old Tupton. The family converted the property into three living units and renamed the premises "Pottery Cottage". The other end of the property was occupied by two schoolteachers named Leonard and Joyce Newman. The central section was unoccupied.

The Mintons were at home at Pottery Cottage when Hughes walked in through the back door of the property, armed with two axes he had retrieved from their shed. He informed the retired couple that he was on the run from the police, having stabbed "two prison officers" and that he needed to lie low until nightfall. Hughes initially assured the Mintons that, if they cooperated, he would not harm them.

Gillian Moran was the first to arrive home following Hughes' intrusion, arriving at her home shortly after 3 p.m. Approximately thirty minutes later, her daughter Sarah alighted her school bus and entered the property. To allay any fear in her daughter, Gillian told the child that Hughes was a stranded motorist waiting for his car to be repaired. The two exchanged smiles. Initially, the adults made small talk over coffee as Sarah—initially believing her mother's claims—sat on the floor and began sewing. Shortly thereafter, the child and her grandfather walked into the annexe to watch television. In a subsequent witness statement, Gillian described Hughes' behaviour in the initial hours of her captivity as calm, illustrating an almost domesticated scene: "Up to this time, (Hughes') manner was friendly." However, he became increasingly agitated as time passed, awaiting Richard's return.

Richard Moran arrived home from a business meeting in Birmingham just after 6 p.m. to find Hughes holding a boning knife to his wife's throat, threatening to kill her if anyone approached him. He forced Richard to the floor and bound his hands and legs with flex cut from a vacuum cleaner and washing line, then tied up Gillian and Amy with similar cords. Amy's distress drew Arthur and Sarah from the annexe; both angrily castigated Hughes, with Arthur shouting for him to leave the family alone as Sarah blurted: "Don't you dare hurt my mummy and daddy! Don't you dare!" Hughes threw Arthur to the ground before dragging the resisting pensioner across the floor, placing him in an armchair where he bound him as Sarah sat terrified and mute on the floor. Despite his earlier assurances to the contrary, Hughes then gagged all the adults, whom he isolated in separate rooms before taking Sarah through to her grandparents' bedroom.

All five hostages spent the first night of captivity alone, bound and gagged, in separate rooms of Pottery Cottage: Gillian in her marital bedroom; Amy in Sarah's bedroom; Richard in a spare room (which had two single beds); Sarah in her grandparents' bedroom; and Arthur in the downstairs lounge. At one stage in the evening, Gillian heard the sounds of a disturbance emanating from the lounge below and rapidly realized that her father was being beaten. Hughes then made tea for his hostages, holding the cup for Gillian while she drank before proceeding to sexually assault her. He then spent the rest of the night chatting to her husband, who was bound in an adjacent room, boasting of his criminal past "as if he'd met [Richard] in a pub".

== 13 January 1977 ==
On the night of 12–13 January, the Peak District saw the heaviest snowfall recorded in the region in over 50 years; many roads were cut off and further blizzard conditions were forecast.

At approximately 7:30 a.m., a local authority vehicle arrived to empty the property's septic tank. Hughes directed Gillian outside to greet the two council workers after warning her to "deal with them, and act normal." (Note: The two council workers later recalled there was nothing within Gillian's demeanour to suggest that anything was untoward.) At this point, Gillian briefly observed her father sitting in the same armchair as the night before, covered with a suede coat. She noted her father was motionless, later recollecting: "He wasn't moving [...] I couldn't see if he was injured or bleeding." Hughes dragged her away, claiming that Arthur was asleep and he had covered him with the coat to keep him warm. He then instructed her to phone her employer and "call in sick"; she was then forced to contact her daughter's school to inform staff her daughter was also unwell. When she enquired as to Sarah's whereabouts and welfare, Hughes claimed the child was asleep in the annexe.

Richard was then forced to phone his place of work to advise that he was also ill before Gillian was ordered to drive to Chesterfield to purchase newspapers and cigarettes and check for roadblocks, with Hughes cautioning her at the doorway to the property: "I've got your family here, Gill. Don't do anything stupid."

When Gillian returned to Pottery Cottage, she immediately noted that her father was no longer sitting in the lounge armchair, causing Hughes to claim he had moved the pensioner into his bedroom. At Hughes' instruction, Gillian prepared "a proper meal" for himself and her family. She and Amy would repeat this experience over the following day. In each instance, Hughes took platefuls of food and beverages through to where he had taken Arthur and Sarah in apparent efforts to convince the three hostages known to be alive at this point that the other two were unharmed. (Note: Investigators later discovered numerous plates and cups of untouched food and drink close to the bodies of Arthur and Sarah, leading investigators to believe the two had been murdered between the late evening of 12 January and the morning of 13 January.) On one occasion, Gillian queried as to why her daughter had not asked for either a "comfort towel" the child had invariably slept with since she had been a baby, or a particular small grey elephant teddy she also slept with every night. Hughes simply shrugged, claiming Sarah "just hasn't" before agreeing to take the items through to the bedroom he had taken her. Upon his return, he claimed to Gillian her daughter "was really pleased to see them", again adding he was forbidding her to see her child.

After reassuring Gillian, Richard and Amy that he intended to leave that evening, Hughes untied them before asking, "You got any cards?" Over the following hours, the four played several games of gin rummy as they drank a bottle of whisky, with Hughes at one point attempting to teach his hostages how to play a Chinese version of patience. Later that evening, Hughes twice briefly left the property on the premise of preparing to escape: firstly taking both Richard and Gillian with him to test run Richard's Chrysler 180 (which he claimed to plan to use in his getaway); then Gillian alone to Sutton in Ashfield in the early hours of the following morning upon the false claim he planned to collect some money owed to him from a friend with whom he had previously committed a burglary.

The region was still experiencing heavy snowfall, and driving conditions were treacherous. As a result, Hughes remained at Pottery Cottage for a second night. Shortly thereafter, Gillian again enquired as to her daughter's well-being; again requesting he allow her daughter to at least sleep alongside her for the night, adding "She must be so frightened." Hughes refused; Gillian later stated: "He became very tense. I didn't mention it again because he frightened me and I wanted to keep him happy."

=== Ongoing police search ===
By 13 January, additional manpower had been devoted to the search, with more than 200 police officers searching within the primary area of focus at any given time. Two British Army helicopters were also deployed to assist in the search, but were soon grounded.

The ongoing search for Hughes remained primarily focused around the area between the crashed vehicle along the B5057 and the A6 road, with the overall strategy of the search focused around the premise that Hughes would inevitably seek temporary respite from the severe weather conditions before ultimately attempting to make his way towards the North West. However, the heavy snowfall and blizzard conditions continued to hamper the search efforts.

The 14 January 1977 front page of the Derbyshire Times, describing the ongoing manhunt to locate Hughes

Due to the extreme weather conditions, both police and the media gave serious credence to the possibility Hughes had sought refuge in a local household, and may be holding the occupant or occupants hostage. House-to-house checks were conducted throughout villages encompassed within the search radius, including as Beeley and Rowsley. However, Pottery Cottage was located just 200 yards to the north of the search radius. Searches were called off in the early evening of 13 January due to the adverse and worsening weather conditions.

== 14 January 1977 ==
On the morning of 14 January, Hughes ordered Gillian to prepare tea and toast for everyone (again taking plates and cups to Arthur and Sarah to give the impression the two were still alive). He then informed Richard and Gillian he needed supplies to assist in his escape, ordering the Morans to drive into Chesterfield to purchase the supplies he would need while on the run including food, cigarettes, a camping gas stove, and fuel. Handing her £25 he had stolen from the couple two days earlier, Hughes stated: "While you're out, buy a nice present for Sarah."

By this stage, all three surviving hostages were close to nervous collapse. While slowing to approach a red traffic light during their journey into Chesterfield, Richard tried to convince his wife that they should go to the police. Fearing the repercussions for their family members still captive inside the house, Gillian sternly refused. The couple purchased all the items Hughes requested before returning to Pottery Cottage.

=== Escape preparations ===
Hughes spent much of the remainder of the afternoon preparing to leave; he again took plates of food and other items through to the grandparents' bedroom for Sarah and the downstairs annexe for Arthur—occasionally relaying fabricated conversations he claimed to have had with Sarah to Gillian to allay any suspicions. At approximately 6 p.m., Hughes announced almost everything was ready for his escape, but he needed more money. He asked Richard whether any cash was stored at the plastics manufacturing firm where he worked. When informed there was, Hughes said, "Right, we'll go and get it." He then forced the Morans to drive him to Brett Plastics, where he stole approximately £210 (the equivalent of about £1,430 as of 2026) from some wage packets and petty cash from the company safe before ordering the couple to drive him back to Pottery Cottage, where he again bound Richard before packing his supplies into the family Chrysler and announcing he was leaving, taking Gillian as a hostage and adding that—as he had previously promised his captives—she would be released to return home to free them once he had driven a reasonable distance from the property.

=== Further murders and police alert ===
Hughes and Gillian departed Pottery Cottage later that evening. After driving for several miles, Hughes insisted on returning to the house, claiming to have forgotten a map. He entered the home alone and fatally stabbed both Richard and Amy with a boning knife he had previously retrieved from the kitchen.

Upon his return to the car, the Chrysler failed to start. Outraged and panic-stricken, Hughes ordered Gillian to approach her neighbours to request assistance. Both Leonard and Joyce Newman quickly deduced something was troubling Gillian, who by this stage was practically insensate from fear. In a croaking voice, Gillian informed the couple as to her family's predicament, saying: "Len, for God's sake, help us!" The couple—who had no phone—immediately drove at high speed to the nearest phone box to alert police. (Note: Upon receipt of this phone call, police deployed numerous officers to Pottery Cottage in addition to erecting numerous roadblocks at strategic positions.)

As Hughes angrily berated Gillian for warning the Newmans as to his whereabouts and her family's predicament, his attention immediately shifted to the sight of a blood-soaked and fatally wounded Amy Minton, who had climbed through a window Hughes had opened, staggering towards the vehicle. Amy collapsed before she could reach the car. Of this scene, Gillian later recollected: "I couldn't believe it [...] She staggered very slowly towards the car. [...] I could see mum lying on her back in the snow [...] I was petrified [...] I was at my wits end." Hughes then dragged Gillian from the car, saying the two would have to "make a run for it". The two soon arrived at the home of another neighbour, mechanic Ronald Frost, whom Hughes asked for assistance in towing the vehicle with his pick-up to "get the car going". Frost agreed, although he understood Gillian was being held captive, and deliberately prolonged the process as much as he could as his wife, Madge, also contacted police from their home. Shortly thereafter, Ronald Frost succeeded in activating the engine to the Chrysler, which sped away in the direction of Baslow.

== Crime scene ==
Having been alerted to the whereabouts of their fugitive and the hostage situation at Pottery Cottage by Leonard and Joyce Newman, scores of police officers and marksmen were deployed to strategic locations around the area; other officers arrived at the premises shortly before 9 p.m. Officers discovered Amy Minton's body, partially covered by snow, lying face-upwards in the garden. The bodies of Richard and Sarah Moran and Arthur Minton were then discovered inside the house. Each decedent had died as a result of shock and haemorrhage due to multiple stab wounds inflicted to their throat and chest. Richard was discovered lying bound and face-down upon the landing; Sarah's body was discovered in a foetal position upon her grandparents' bedroom floor; and Arthur was discovered downstairs with his arms bound behind his back, concealed beneath a white overcoat.

Physical and circumstantial evidence at the crime scene revealed that, although Hughes had attempted to deceive Amy, Gillian and Richard that Arthur and Sarah had been alive throughout their captivity, both had most likely been murdered either on the night of 12 January or in the early hours of the following day.

=== Police pursuit ===
Although Hughes had managed to leave the vicinity of the crime scene shortly before the arrival of police, the Chrysler was soon observed driving at high speed along the A619. Numerous police cars soon caught up with the vehicle and thus began a high speed, multiple-car chase across Derbyshire, via Chapel-en-le-Frith, and which ultimately progressed into Cheshire.

At one stage of the pursuit, an unmarked Morris Marina police car cut in front of the Chrysler, causing Hughes to swerve and crash into a wall. The two officers inside the vehicle ran towards the Chrysler, only to observe Hughes threatening to murder Gillian if they approached further. Hughes then dragged Gillian from the vehicle, forcing the two officers to surrender their vehicle to him. He then continued to drive away at high speed from the scene of the accident.

=== Standoff ===
The police pursuit of Hughes ultimately ended just before 10 p.m. when he attempted to avoid a Crosville single-decker bus which had been strategically positioned to horizontally block an arterial road in the village of Rainow. Hughes attempted to swerve around the bus but lost control of the car, spinning the Morris Marina around, mounting a kerb and crashing through a street sign, then into a drystone wall.

The site of Hughes' final standoff with police following his crash in Rainow, Cheshire, as photographed 14 January 1977

The Marina was rapidly surrounded by numerous police vehicles as Hughes held an axe over Gillian's head, screaming threats and demanding a vehicle in which to escape to be parked directly alongside the Marina, facing in the direction of Macclesfield, and a safe passage to drive from the scene. As firearms officers moved into place, Chief Inspector Peter Howse led the hostage negotiations, even offering himself as an alternate hostage if Hughes agreed to release Gillian. A getaway vehicle was provided midway through the stand-off, but Gillian—virtually catatonic by this stage—refused to move. (Note: Of this decision on Gillian's part, Howse later recalled: "Their relationship as hostage and captor had reached breaking point.")

=== Perpetrator's death ===
After approximately fifty minutes of negotiations, Hughes' patience snapped. He screamed "Right! Your time's up!" and swung the axe at Gillian's head. Simultaneously, Howse jumped through the rear window of the vehicle, partly parrying the blow from the weapon (which gashed Gillian's forehead) while a firearms officer named Frank Pell fired one shot through the shattered rear passenger window, which deflected off Hughes' skull. Hughes then struck Howse once upon the arm with the axe as Gillian attempted to cower against the door of the vehicle. As he bit deeply into Howse's arm as he continued to attempt to strike Gillian, a further three rounds were fired, the last of which entered Hughes' shoulder, passing through his aorta and killing him. Hughes' body fell across Gillian's lap. The final and fatal shot was fired by an officer named Alan Nicholls.

== Official inquiries ==
=== Chief Inspector of the Prison Service inquiry ===
On 10 March 1977, the Chief Inspector of the Prison Service, Gordon Fowler, published a fifty-seven page report into the systematic failings which had allowed Hughes to escape from prison. The Fowler Report severely criticised the management and staff at HMP Leicester regarding their failure to pursue standard searching procedures after Hughes had stolen the knife from the prison kitchen more than one month before his escape. Fowler was also critical of the procedural search methods used before prisoner transfers; recommending obligatory strip searches in all future cases. He also noted the lack of information provided by the police to the prison service to enable the prison service to correctly assess the level of danger Hughes actually presented to society and thus categorize Hughes appropriately. Further criticism focused upon the overall breakdown in communications between differing prison departments which had ultimately left Hughes' records incomplete.

"The information sent to the prison by the police and other agencies while [Hughes] was on remand was not enough to identify him as a person prone to extreme violence or as a potentially dangerous psychopath."

— Section of the Fowler Report, published 10 March 1977.

Fowler made seventeen separate recommendations to be implemented with immediate effect—all of which the Home Secretary, Merlyn Rees, accepted. A further eight were recommended for further review. Despite the numerous issues highlighted in the Fowler Report, no disciplinary action was initiated against any member of staff or management, as the failures were deemed to have been systematic and not the fault of any individual.

Derbyshire Constabulary were also criticised for primarily concentrating their search for Hughes upon routes from Chesterfield to Lancashire in the belief he would most likely be heading in this direction. In a Parliamentary debate held on the date of the publishing of the Fowler Report, Home Secretary Merlyn Rees stated the isolated or abandoned properties in bleak moorland would have been ideal for a fugitive hiding from the police and taking shelter in the extreme weather conditions and that, although police searches had "extended to farm buildings in the Eastmoor area", Pottery Cottage was not searched, in part due to "all outward appearances the cottages were occupied by their usual residents and life was continuing normally" for the occupants.

=== Coroner's inquiry ===
The official inquest into the deaths at Pottery Cottage and the shooting of Hughes was held in Chesterfield on 27 April 1977.

The two police officers who fired upon Hughes testified at these hearings that they had done so to protect the life of his hostage. Also to testify was Superintendent Peter Howse, (Note: By April 1977, Howse had been promoted to the rank of superintendent.) who stated Hughes was "in a state of frenzy" at the time he was shot and that Gillian "would not have been alive today if we had not taken the course (of action) we did." Home Office Pathologist Dr. Alan Usher also confirmed that all four victims found at Pottery Cottage had died as a result of multiple stab wounds inflicted by Hughes and that Hughes himself had died from gunshot wounds. Unanimous murder verdicts were returned for each of the victims at Pottery Cottage and a verdict of justifiable homicide in the case of Hughes.

At the conclusion of the inquest, both the coroner and jury praised the bravery of Superintendent Howse for preventing Hughes from striking Gillian with the axe, with the latter recommending that he receive a commendation. Howse was later awarded the Queen's Commendation for Brave Conduct.

== Aftermath ==
The shooting of Hughes proved to be the first occasion an officer from Derbyshire Constabulary had fatally shot a suspect and the first instance in which British police had shot dead an escaped, armed and dangerous prisoner.

Both prior to and immediately after receiving medical treatment at a local hospital, Gillian repeatedly asked as to the welfare of her family, although police and medical staff delayed relaying this information to her. She was not informed of the fate of her parents, husband and only child until shortly after receiving treatment for her injuries.

The joint funeral service for Richard and Sarah Moran and Arthur and Amy Minton was conducted at Brimington Cemetery, Chesterfield on Friday 21 January 1977. Over one hundred mourners attended the service. Gillian and her sister, Barbara, were driven to the funeral service in a black Daimler accompanied via a police escort. In efforts to distract the media, the women were required to switch vehicles midway to the service.

The same day as the funerals of those killed at Pottery Cottage was held, an ATV journalist conducted an interview with Teresa O'Doherty, who had terminated her relationship with Hughes via telephone shortly before his escape. In this interview, O'Doherty discussed aspects of her relationship with Hughes and her apprehension upon learning of his escape from prison before stating: "All I can say is I wish to God it had been me and not that family... and I really mean that."

The responsibility for arranging the funeral of Hughes fell to the Home Office. Initial plans were devised for Hughes to be buried at Chesterfield's Boythorpe Cemetery on 25 January. However, news of this decision triggered fierce protests from local residents who did not wish him to be buried in the cemetery and insisted he be interred at HM Prison Leicester with other inmates who had previously been executed at this location.

Numerous local residents vowed to disinter Hughes' corpse if he was interred within the cemetery; several residents refilled the burial site which had been prepared for the scheduled funeral before attaching a set of chains tied with a padlock to the cemetery gates and hanging a board, signed by scores of local residents protesting the decision to inter Hughes in the cemetery, at the location. These protests lead to the proposed funeral plans to be altered at the last minute. Hughes' body was later cremated. The service was conducted at the same location as those whom he had murdered.

Gillian Moran later sold the exclusive rights to her story to the Daily Mail; she was interviewed by Lynda Lee-Potter and her account was serialised in eight parts, commencing 14 February 1977. She has never since spoken to the media about the events at Pottery Cottage.

In December 1978, Gillian married Jim Mulqueen; a cousin of her first husband. Two years later, she gave birth to a daughter. Reportedly, the strain of emotionally supporting Gillian took its toll on her husband, who began drinking heavily. In December 1987, Mulqueen was jailed for two years for threatening a publican with a shotgun.

At Gillian's request, she and Superintendent Howse met by prearrangement three months after the murder of her family and her rescue. At this meeting, she thanked Howse for his role in saving her life. In 2017, Alan Nicholls (who had died eight years previously) was posthumously awarded the Derbyshire Police Federation bravery award, which was formally accepted by members of his family.

== Media ==
=== Literature ===
- Lee, Carol Ann; Howse, Peter (2020). The Pottery Cottage Murders: The First-hand Account of a Family Held Hostage. New York City: Little, Brown Book Group. ISBN 978-1-4721-4391-4

=== Television ===
- In 1982, YTV began production upon the film The Pottery Cottage Murders. The director of this project was David Green, with Julie Walters cast as Gillian Moran. However, the project was scrapped in 1983, in part due to general public revulsion.

== See also ==
- Hostage taking
- List of hostage crises
- Manipulation (psychology)
- Stockholm syndrome – Contested psychological condition

== Cited works and further reading ==
- Allen, Robert; Frost, John (1983). Voice of Britain: The Inside Story of the Daily Express. Yeovil: Patrick Stephens Publisher. ISBN 978-0-850-59569-7.
- Baggoley, Martin (2012). Derbyshire Murders. Cheltenham: History Press. ISBN 978-0-752-48405-1.
- Burrows, Robert (2006). Infamous Cheshire. Cheltenham: History Press. ISBN 978-0-750-95330-6.
- Crelinsten, Ronald D. (1979). Hostage-taking. Singapore: Marshall Cavendish. ISBN 978-0-669-02841-6.
- Franscell, Ron (2011). Delivered from Evil: True Stories of Ordinary People Who Faced Monstrous Mass Killers and Survived. Massacheusetts: Fair Winds Press. ISBN 978-1-592-33440-7.
- Hickey, Eric (2003). Encyclopedia of Murder and Violent Crime. London: Sage Publications. ISBN 0-7619-2437-X.
- Hurndall, Alan. R. (2019). Pottery Cottage: The Peak District Killings That Shook Britain. Sheffield: Northend Publishing Ltd. ISBN 978-1-999-70267-0.
- Lane, Bran (1993). Real-Life Crimes. London, England: Eaglemoss Publications Ltd. ISBN 978-1-856-29960-2.
- Lane, Brian; Gregg, Wilfred (1994) [1988]. The Encyclopedia of Mass Murder. London: Headline Book Publishing. ISBN 0-747-20897-2.
- Lee, Carol Ann; Howse, Peter (2020). The Pottery Cottage Murders: The First-hand Account of a Family Held Hostage. New York City: Little, Brown Book Group. ISBN 978-1-4721-4391-4.
- Lloyd, Georgina (1986). One Was Not Enough: True Stories of Multiple Murderers. London: Bantam Books. ISBN 978-0-553-17605-6.
- Saddler, Geoffrey (2004). More Foul Deeds and Suspicious Deaths Chesterfield. Barnsley: Wharncliffe Books. ISBN 978-1-903-42568-8.
- Whittington-Egan, Richard; Whittington-Egan, Molly (1992). The Murder Almanac. Glasgow: Neil Wilson Publishing Ltd. ISBN 978-1-897-78404-4.
