= Listed buildings in Whitfield, Derbyshire =

High Peak District England

Whitfield is a hamlet to the south of Glossop in the High Peak district of Derbyshire, England. The hamlet contains 14 listed buildings that are recorded in the National Heritage List for England. All the listed buildings are designated at Grade II, the lowest of the three grades, which is applied to "buildings of national importance and special interest". Apart from a well, all the listed buildings are houses, some of which have been converted from buildings with other original uses.

== Buildings ==
Name and location	Photograph	Date	Notes
Hobb Hill Cottage; 53.43573°N 1.94639°W		1638	A farmhouse, later a private house, in millstone grit, partly rendered, with quoins, and a stone slate roof. There are two storeys and a front of two bays, the left bay gabled. The doorway has a flush surround, the windows have chamfered surrounds, some with hood moulds, and in the upper floor is an initialled datestone.
60, 62 and 64 Hague Street; 53.43476°N 1.94704°W		Late 17th century	A laithe house and outbuilding, later converted into three houses. They are in millstone grit with quoins mad stone slate roofs. There are two storeys, five bays, and a rear wing. The doorways have flush surround, some windows are mullioned and others are replacement casements.
53 Hague Street; 53.43536°N 1.94705°W		Early 18th century	A house and a barn, later combined into a house, it is in millstone grit with quoins and a stone slate roof. There are two storeys, a single depth plan, two bays, and a lean-to porch on the left. On the front and left return are mullioned windows, and at the rear are double doors, casement windows and slit vents.
40 Hague Street; 53.43542°N 1.94720°W		Mid-18th century	A house in millstone grit, with a stone slate roof, a double depth plan, and two bays. The doorway has a square surround, and the windows are casements.
52, 54 and 56 Hague Street; 53.43509°N 1.94733°W		Mid-18th century	A public house and two houses, later three houses, in millstone grit with stone slate roofs. The former public house on the left, has two storeys and a basement, a double depth plan, and a single bay. On the front is a lean-to porch, and the windows either have a single light, or are mullioned. The other houses have two storeys, one bay each, and contain mullioned or cross casement windows.
Flatt Farmhouse; 53.43819°N 1.94426°W		Mid-18th century	A farmhouse, later a private house, in millstone grit, with quoins, and a stone slate roof. There are two storeys, three bays, and a small rear outshut. The central doorway is round-headed with a rusticated surround. The windows are mullioned with some mullions removed, and at the rear is a narrow staircase window.
Whitfield Well; 53.43745°N 1.94704°W		Mid-18th century	The well consists of an L-shaped series of rectangular troughs containing spring water, with moulded stone dams at intervals, and a stone table above part of a trough. To the rear are two sections of coped walling.
7, 29 and 31 Hague Street and ramp 53.43656°N 1.94558°W		1773	A house, later divided into three, it is in millstone grit with quoins, and a roof of Welsh slate at the front and tile at the rear. There are two storeys, an attic and a basement, and a symmetrical front of three bays. The central doorway has a heavy lintel, and above it is a diamond-shaped initialled and dated plaque. The windows are mullioned with some mullions removed, and contain casements. In front of the house are ramps and iron railings with barley-sugar balusters and finials.
35 Whitfield Cross; 53.43745°N 1.94613°W		1773	A farmhouse, later a private house, in millstone grit, the right return rendered, with a stone slate roof. There are two storeys, two bays, and a rear outshut with a catslide roof. The doorway has a flush surround, the windows are casements, some with mullions, and in the upper floor is a painted dated plaque.
3 and 5 Hague Street; 53.43676°N 1.94529°W		Late 18th century	A farmhouse, cottage, smithy, and stables, later two houses. They are in painted millstone grit on a plinth, with quoins, and a stone slate roof. There are two storeys and an attic, and five bays. The windows are casements, some with mullions.
22, 24 and 28 Hague Street; 53.43566°N 1.94711°W		Late 18th century	A farmhouse and outbuilding, later three houses, in millstone grit with a stone slate roof. There are two storeys, three bays, a single depth plan, a catslide roof at the rear, and a parallel projecting range on the right. One doorway has a heavy lintel and band, and another has a flush surround. The windows are casements, with some mullions removed.
55, 57 and 59 Hague Street; 53.43519°N 1.94709°W		Late 18th century	A row of weavers' cottages, later three houses, in millstone grit with quoins and stone slate roofs. There are two storeys and seven bays. The doorways have flush surrounds, and the windows are casements, some with mullions.
61 Hague Street; 53.43496°N 1.94700°W		Late 18th century	A pair of weavers' houses, later combined into one house. It is in millstone grit with a stone slate roof, three storeys and two bays. In the centre are paired doorways with flush surrounds, and the windows are mullioned with three lights, those in the lower two floors with flat hoods. In the right return is a taking-in door converted into a window, and on the left return is an inserted architectural ornament.
School House and Building; 53.43628°N 1.94628°W		1779	A school and schoolmaster's house converted into three dwellings, the building is in millstone grit, it has a stone slate roof, and on the left gable is a bellcote with pilasters and a ball finial. There are four bays, the left three the former school, with two storeys, the right bay the house, with three storeys, all under the same roof. In the left bay is a doorway with a pointed arch, and above is a painted plaque. The second and third bays contain windows with pointed arches, and between the upper floor windows is an inscribed plaque with a pointed head. The right bay contains a doorway with a rusticated surround and a heavy lintel, and casement windows.
