= Hob Hurst's House =

Bronze Age barrow in Derbyshire, England

Coordinates: 53°13′12″N 1°34′12″W

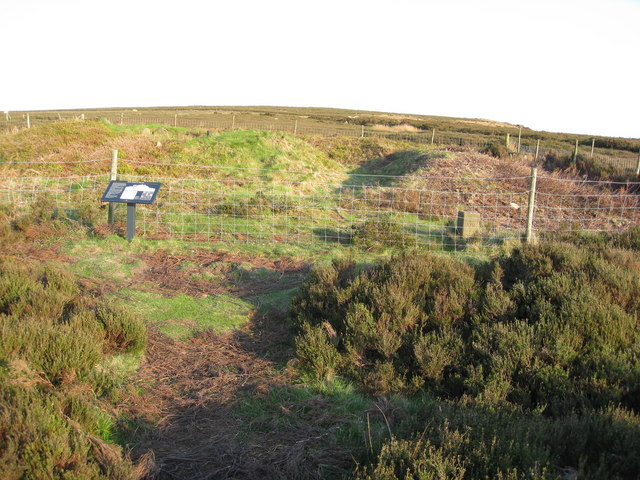

Hob Hurst's House is a Bronze Age barrow on Beeley Moor near Bakewell in Derbyshire. It is unique in that instead of the normal round shape, Hob Hurst's barrow is rectangular. Originally made with 13 stones, only five remain today.

The barrow is in the guardianship of English Heritage and is a Scheduled Ancient Monument.

It is situated on Harland Edge above Chatsworth House, near the highest part of Beeley Moor.

The Peak District Boundary Walk runs alongside Gibbet Moor, past Hob Hurst's House and onto Beeley village.

The barrow is 11 yards (10 m) in diameter and 4 feet (1.2 m) high, with a ditch and an external bank of 22 yards (20 m) diameter.

The barrow was excavated in 1853 by Thomas Bateman, the "Barrow Knight". The dig found a stone-lined grave containing some scorched human bones plus some lead ore.

== See also ==
- Bronze Age Britain
- Hob, a mythical creature in English folklore.
- Wayland's Smithy, an Early Neolithic chambered long barrow.
- The Excavation of Hob's Barrow, a video game partially inspired by Hob Hurst's House.
