= Barbara Atkinson =

British actress

- Born: 8 January 1926; Manchester, UK
- Died: 1 January 2015 (aged 88)
- Occupation: Actress

Barbara Atkinson (8 January 1926 – 1 January 2015) was an English actress from Manchester. Her first professional appearance was at the Birmingham Repertory Theatre in December 1945. She appeared in various television episodes from 1965 onwards.

== Biography ==
Barbara Atkinson was born in Manchester to Charles Stuart Atkinson and Dorothy Carol (née Lyons) Atkinson. She was educated in Châtelard and trained for the stage at the Birmingham Repertory Theatre.

== Stage work ==
Atkinson made her first professional stage appearance at the Birmingham Repertory Theatre in December 1945 in the role of Mr. Fox in Toad of Toad Hall. Her early career also included repertory work in such towns as Swindon, Wigan, and Wednesbury. Atkinson made her debut West End theatre performance in the role of Mary Williams in Serious Charge at the Garrick Theatre in February 1955. She went on to do more repertory work in such towns as Oxford, Birmingham, and Nottingham. Atkinson appeared with the National Theatre Company for the 1969–70 season as "Mincing" in The Way of the World. In 1978, Atkinson appeared at the Greenwich Theatre as Lady Markby in An Ideal Husband.

== Film work ==
Atkinson appeared on several television shows since 1965. Her first television performance was in an episode of The Wednesday Play in 1965. Atkinson went on to portray Miss Fellowes in the 1974 television adaptation of William Somerset Maugham's novel Cakes and Ale. She also played neurotic and socially superior inmate Margaret Wallace in a memorable 1976 episode of the prison drama Within These Walls. Her most recent television performance was in a 1998 episode of The Bill.

== Death ==
Barbara Atkinson died on New Year's Day 2015, one week before her 89th birthday.
