= Whitfield, Derbyshire =

Hamlet in Derbyshire, England

Coordinates: 53.441°N 1.952°W

Whitfield
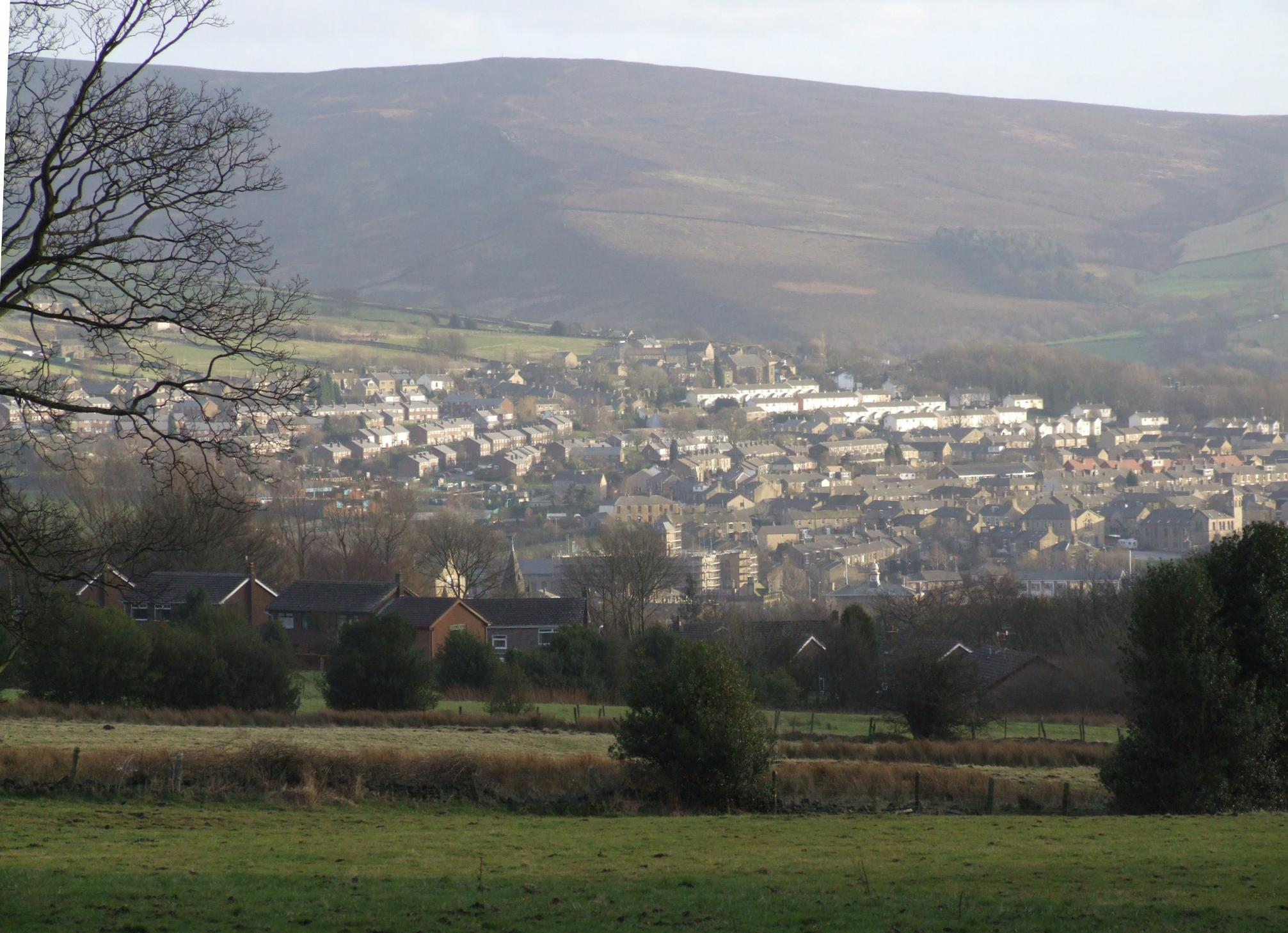
- Whitfield

- Location within Derbyshire
- OS grid reference: SK034938
- District: High Peak
- Shire county: Derbyshire
- Region: East Midlands
- Country: England
- Sovereign state: United Kingdom
- Post town: GLOSSOP
- Postcode district: SK13
- Police: Derbyshire
- Fire: Derbyshire
- Ambulance: North West
- UK Parliament: High Peak

Whitfield is a hamlet and former parish in Derbyshire, England. It is half a mile (1km) south of Glossop Town Hall, south of Glossop Brook between Bray Clough and Hurst Brook. Whitfield was one of the original townships in the ancient Parish of Glossop. Up to the latter part of the 18th century the hamlet was devoted mostly to agriculture with an area of 2,608 statute acres.

== Name ==
The name was recorded as Witfeld in the Domesday Book of 1086 A.D. The Survey of English Place-Names records it as Witfeld (1086), Whitefeld (1226) and Wytfeld (1282)

The name element wit is from Old English wiht ("weight") which itself is derived from Latin vectis ("lever"). The name element feld is from Old English feld ("field").

== History ==
The Manor of Whitfield was conveyed in 1330 to John Foljambe. Though held with the manor of Glossop, the land in Whitfield was mostly not part of the Norfolk estate unlike most of the manor of Glossop. When it was enclosed by act of parliament in 1810 it was recorded as being 1,577 acres (6.38 km^{2}). Included in Whitfield are the villages of Charlestown and Littlemoor.

The Turnlee Paper factory was in Littlemoor. St James, Littlemoor, was consecrated in 1845 and is built in the Early English style, with tower and 114-foot (35 m) spire. There is a Methodist Chapel at Whitfield; the Wesleyan Reformers and Independent Calvinists had chapels at Littlemoor.

When Glossop expanded, and the Howardtown Mills were constructed, Whitfield was subsumed into the new town. Power looms were introduced into these mills in 1825. In 1835 Whitfield church was extended to take the increased congregation, and a Church of England primary school was built in 1848; an infant school was added by Anne Kershaw Wood in 1913.

== See also ==
- Listed buildings in Whitfield, Derbyshire
- List of mills in Longdendale and Glossopdale
- List of Sites of Special Scientific Interest in Derbyshire
- Peak District Boundary Walk

== Sources ==
- Morris, Mel (2014). Whitfield Conservation Area – Character Appraisal (PDF). High Peak Borough Council.
- Clark Hall, John Richard (1916). A Concise Anglo−Saxon Dictionary, Second Edition. The Macmillan Company.
- Levin, John, ed. (1896). 'OS Map name 002/SE', in Map of Derbyshire (Southampton, 1882-1896) (Map). British History Online.
