= W. R. Mitchell =

British writer and editor

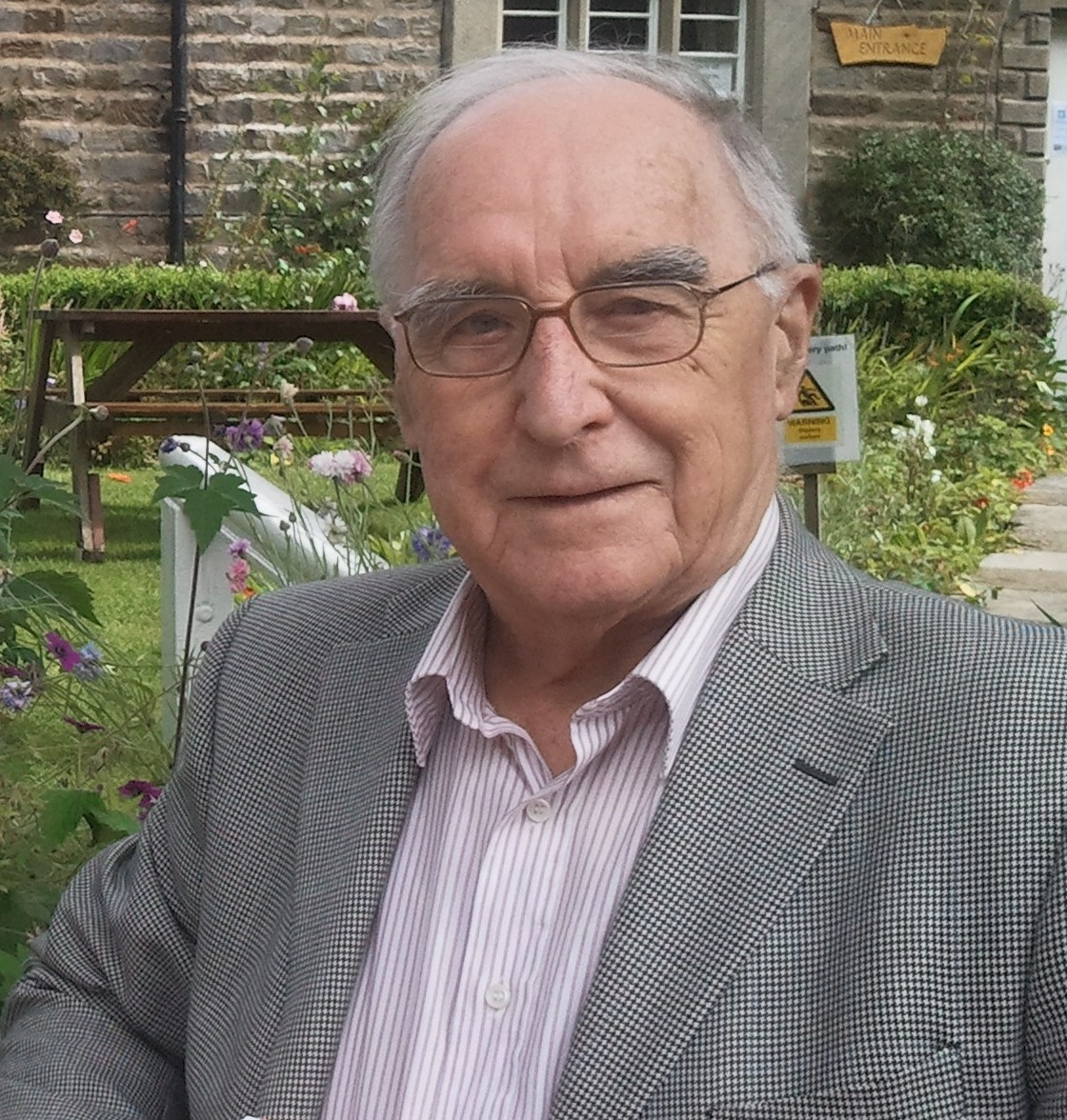
- Born: William Reginald Mitchell; 15 January 1928; Skipton, West Riding of Yorkshire, England
- Died: 7 October 2015 (aged 87); Steeton with Eastburn, West Yorkshire

William Reginald Mitchell MBE (15 January 1928 – 7 October 2015) was a British writer who was the editor of Dalesman magazine for twenty years and over a sixty-year period wrote over 200 books, hundreds of articles, and delivered many talks on the history and physical and natural evolution of North Britain, with particular emphasis on the Yorkshire Dales, Lancashire and the Lake District. These include the regions' biographies, social history, topography, and natural history. In the course of his career Mitchell made and collected many taped interviews with people of these regions - now housed at the Universities of Leeds and Bradford - representing a unique archive of dialect and history.

== Life and career ==
W R Mitchell was born in 1928 at Skipton, then in the West Riding of Yorkshire. His family worked in the local textile industry and were staunch Methodists; a religion that played an important part in Bill Mitchell's own life in later years; he was a Methodist local preacher for over 40 years. In 1943, aged 15, Bill Mitchell joined the 'Craven Herald' regional newspaper as a junior reporter.

After national service at Royal Navy air stations, he returned to the newspaper, but in 1948 was asked by Harry J. Scott, editor of Dalesman, to join the staff of the magazine. Dalesman, founded in 1939, is a well-regarded regional magazine still in publication today, and has since its inception documented the lives, past and present, of people in the Yorkshire Dales and the wider Yorkshire countryside.

From 1951, in addition to his work with Dalesman, Mitchell began editing 'Cumbria', a magazine that covered the Lake District area of England. In the course of his journalistic work, he met and interviewed many people, which subsequently formed the basis for his feature articles and many of his later books. In 1952 he married Freda Bancroft and has two children, David and Janet.

In 1969 Mitchell became editor of Dalesman, a post he held until his retirement in 1986. Yorkshire Television marked his retirement with a programme about his life, narrated by Alan Bennett. Following his retirement, he established his own publishing company, 'Castleberg', from his home in Giggleswick, near Settle, North Yorkshire. In 1996 Mitchell was awarded the MBE for his services to journalism in Yorkshire and Cumbria, and received an honorary degree of Doctor of Letters from the University of Bradford. In the same year Mitchell became an Honorary member of the Yorkshire Dales Society, later President and the Society's first Patron.

Bill Mitchell was always been a keen naturalist and this interest infused his writing over many years. He was associated with the British Deer Society, The Yorkshire Naturalist Trust, the Cumbrian Wild Life Trust, and the Royal Society for the Protection of Birds. He was a founder member of the Royal Naval Bird Watching Society. He also received a Golden Eagle Award in 2007 from the Outdoor Writers’ and Photographers’ Guild, which cited him as one of the founding fathers of outdoor writing. In September 2009 he was voted 'Greatest Living Icon' for the Yorkshire Dales National Park in a poll by this organisation to mark the 60th anniversary of the National Parks. The following year, May 2010, he won the Lifetime Achievement Award at the Dalesman Rural Awards Ceremony in Harrogate for his work in recording the history, heritage and wildlife of the Yorkshire Dales and Moors. In April 2014, to commemorate the 75th anniversary of the Dalesman, he was voted no 33 in a poll to find the 75 Greatest Icons of Yorkshire.

He wrote a regular column in the Bradford 'Telegraph & Argus' newspaper for several years: 'Letter from the Dales'; he was also a regular contributor to the North Yorkshire 'Craven Herald' newspaper (History Pages); and had a monthly feature in the Dalesman:'Dalesfolk I Remember'(see Media Coverage links, below). He died at Airedale General Hospital on 7 October 2015, aged 87.

== W. R. Mitchell Archive ==
The majority of Mitchell's cassette tapes of Dales life are deposited in the University of Leeds (Special Collections) library. The university has a large collection of oral histories as part of The Leeds Archive of Vernacular Culture (survey of English dialects).

These cassette tapes feature interviews, including those conducted with the author, Alfred Wainwright, and with Alf Wight, more commonly known as ‘James Herriot’, as well as interviews with people who had known Beatrix Potter. These taped stories range from those told by the local gentry - such as the Dawsons of the Folly in Settle, and the Yorkes of Halton Place - to ordinary folk living in remote Dales communities.

They also present a record of different Dales accents and dialects used over forty years ago and which, because of greater social mobility, are less frequently heard today. The Leeds Archive collection also features a selection of Bill Mitchell's printed works and correspondence with Lakeland residents, including the sculptor Josephina Banner de Vasconcellos.

The University of Bradford Library also has eight boxes of W R Mitchell material, including scrapbooks, correspondence and audio tapes.

In 2011 the W.R. Mitchell Archive was established by Sita Brand and is managed by the charity, Settle Stories, based in Settle, North Yorkshire. The aim is to make a selection of these tapes easily and freely accessible to the public. In January 2012, Settle Stories received a £50,000 Heritage Lottery Fund grant to digitise a selection of the cassette tapes. This will enable all interested to research, read and listen to these oral histories online.

== Works ==
=== Books (including co-authorship) ===
• North Ribblesdale (1961) Clapham (North Yorks.):Dalesman.

• Hollow mountains: The story of man's conquest of the caves and potholes of North-West Yorkshire throughout 10,000 years (1961 self-published, reprinted 1989 by Castleberg).

• Long Drag A Story Of Men Under Stress During The Construction Of The Settle - Carlisle Line (self published 1962).

• Men of Lakeland (1966) London: Dent.

• Lancashire Witch Country (1966) Clapham (North Yorks.):Dalesman.

• Sacred Place of the Lake District (1966; reprinted 1999) Giggleswick: Castleberg.

• Settle-Carlisle Railway: the Midland's Record-breaking Route to Scotland. (1966). Clapham (North Yorks.):Dalesman.

• Haworth and the Brontes: A visitor's guide (1966) (1966). Clapham (North Yorks.):Dalesman.

• A Year with the Curlews: Life on the Northern Pennines (1967) Giggleswick: Castleberg.

• Haworth and The Brontes (A Visitor’s Guide) (1967) Clapham (North Yorks.): Dalesman.

• The John Peel Story (1968). Clapham (North Yorks.):Dalesman.

• Settle-Carlisle Railway (1969) Clapham (North Yorks.):Dalesman.

• Haunted Yorkshire (1969) Clapham (North Yorks.): Dalesman.

• Grasmere and the Wordsworths (1970). Clapham (North Yorks.):Dalesman.

• Haunts of Robin Hood (1970). Clapham (North Yorks.):Dalesman.

• Haworth and the Brontes (1971). Clapham (North Yorks.):Dalesman. • A Few Million Birds (1971) London: Hale.

• Highland Spring Travels In The Highland (1972) London: Hale.

• Pennine Birds: A Visitor's Handbook (1973) Clapham (North Yorks.):Dalesman.

• Across Morecambe Bay: By the Oversands Route (1973) Clapham (North Yorks.):Dalesman.

• Lakeland Birds (1974) Clapham (North Yorks.): Dalesman.

• Lakeland A-Z: A Handbook for Visitors (1975). Clapham (North Yorks.):Dalesman.

• The Railway Shanties. Navvy Life During The Construction Of The Settle-Carslisle Line (1975). Clapham (North Yorks.):Dalesman.

• West Highland Summer (1975) London: Hale.

• Yorkshire Dales A-Z (1975). Clapham (North Yorks.):Dalesman.

• Lakeland A to Z (1975) (reprinted ABC of Lakeland 1979). Clapham (North Yorks.): Dalesman.

• Settle Carlisle Centenary: 100 Years in Pictures of England's Highest Main Line Railway (with David Joy) (1975) Clapham (North Yorks.): Dalesman.

• Settle-Carlisle Railway. A Centenary Edition (with David Joy) (1976) Clapham (North Yorks.):Dalesman.

• Wild Pennines (1976) London: Hale.

• Seven Years Hard: Building the Settle-Carlisle Railway (1976) Clapham (North Yorks.): Dalesman.

• Around Morecambe Bay: From Lune's Mouth to Walney (1977) Clapham (North Yorks.): Dalesman.

• Birdwatching in Yorkshire (1977) Clapham (North Yorks.): Dalesman.

• Fred Taylor: Yorkshire Cheesemaker (1977) Giggleswick: Castleberg.

• Highland Autumn (1977) London: Hale.

• Lancashire Mill Town Traditions (1977) Clapham (North Yorks.): Dalesman.

• Lake District Sports(1977) Clapham (North Yorks.): Dalesman.

• Yorkshire Mill Town Traditions (1978). Clapham (North Yorks.):Dalesman.

• Exploring the Robin Hood Country (1978) Clapham (North Yorks.): Dalesman.

• Life in the Yorkshire Dales: A Pictorial Review (1980) Clapham (North Yorks.): Dalesman. • Lake Poets: An Illustrated Selection of Verse (1980) Clapham (North Yorks.): Dalesman.

• Wild Cumbria (1978) London: Hale.

• Exploring Captain Cook Country (1978) Clapham (North Yorks.): Dalesman.

• Exploring the Lancashire Witch Country (1978) Clapham (North Yorks.): Dalesman.

• Pennine Lead-miner: Eric Richardson of Nenthead (1978) Clapham (North Yorks.): Dalesman.

• Education for Peace (1978) Belfast: Christian Journals Ltd.

• East Sussex (Shell Guides) (1978) London: Faber and Faber.

• Cumbrian Blacksmith: Jonty Wilson of Kirkby Lonsdale (1979) Clapham (North Yorks.): Dalesman.

• Exploring the Ribble Valley (1979) Clapham (North Yorks.): Dalesman.

• Life in the Lake District: Pictorial Memories of a Bygone Age (1980) Clapham (North Yorks.): Dalesman.

• Bowness and Windermere (1980) Clapham (North Yorks.): Dalesman.

• The Lake Poets: An Illustrated Selection of Verse (1980) Clapham (North Yorks.): Dalesman.

• Life on the North York Moors: a pictorial review (1981). Clapham (North Yorks.):Dalesman.

• Yorkshire Pride (1981) Clapham (North Yorks.):Dalesman.

• Lancashire Pride. An Illustrated Anthology of Prose and Verse (1981) Skipton: Dalesman.

• Yorkshire Dales Folk (1981) Clapham (North Yorks.): Dalesman.

• Ghosts of Yorkshire (1982) Clapham (North Yorks.):Dalesman.

• Life on the Yorkshire Coast (1982) Clapham (North Yorks.):Dalesman.

• Life in Lancashire Mill Towns (1982) Clapham (North Yorks.): Dalesman.

• Lakeland Dalesfolk (1983) Clapham (North Yorks.): Dalesman.

• Bird Watch Around Scotland (1983) London: Hale.

• Life on the Settle-Carlisle Railway (1984) Clapham (North Yorks.):Dalesman.

• Life on the Yorkshire Pennines (1984). Clapham (North Yorks.):Dalesman.

• Life in the Lancashire Mill Towns (1984) Clapham (North Yorks.): Dalesman.

• Wordsworth's Lake District (1984) Clapham (North Yorks.): Dalesman.

• Life Around Morecambe Bay (with Cedric Robinson) (1986) Clapham (North Yorks.): Dalesman.

• Vintage Dalesman. Classic articles from "The Dalesman" (1987). Clapham (North Yorks.):Dalesman.

• Walks from the Settle-Carlisle Railway (1987) Clapham (North Yorks.):Dalesman.

• Edward Elgar in the Yorkshire Dales (1987) Giggleswick: Castleberg.

• Beatrix Potter Remembered: Her Life in Lakeland (1987) Clapham (North Yorks.): Dalesman.

• J.B.Priestley's Yorkshire (1987) Clapham (North Yorks.): Dalesman.

• Lancashire Milltown Memories (1987) Clapham (North Yorks.): Dalesman.

• The Changing Dales (1988) Clapham (North Yorks.):Dalesman.

• The Fabulous Cliffords (1988) Giggleswick: Castleberg.

• Gossip from Giggleswick (1988) Giggleswick: Castleberg.

• Yorkshire's Hollow Mountains (1989) Giggleswick: Castleberg.

• How They Built the Settle-Carlisle Railway (1989) Settle: Kingfisher Productions.

• How They Lived in Old Settle (1989) Giggleswick: Castleberg.

• Changing Lakeland: Forty Years of ‘Progress’ (1989). Clapham (North Yorks.): Dalesman.

• The Very Best of Yorkshire Humour. Tales Told by Charlie Lawson (1989) Clapham (North Yorks.): Dalesman.

• A Dalesman's Diary (1989) London: Souvenir Press.

• The Elgar Way (1990) Giggleswick: Castleberg.

• Its a Long Way to Muckle Flugga (1990) Souvenir Press Ltd

• Ghosts of the Settle-Carlisle Railway (1990) Giggleswick: Castleberg.

• Story of Ribblehead Viaduct (1990) Settle: Kingfisher Productions.

• Footplate Tales of the Settle-Carlisle Railway (1990). Giggleswick: Castleberg.

• Garsdale and Aisgill on the Settle-Carlisle Railway (1991) Giggleswick: Castleberg.

• Nowt's Same: A Light Hearted Review of Dales Life in the 20th Century (1991) Giggleswick: Castleberg.

• High Dale Country (1991) London: Souvenir Press.

• The Giggleswick Scores of Edward Elgar (1990) Giggleswick: Castleberg.

• Mr. Elgar and Dr.Buck: A Musical Friendship (1991) Giggleswick: Castleberg.

• By Gum, Life Were Sparse! Memories of the Northern Mill Towns (1991) London: Souvenir Press.

• Hellifield and the Railway (1991) Giggleswick: Castleberg.

• Dry Stone Walls of Yorkshire (1992). Giggleswick: Castleberg.

• Drystone Walls in the Yorkshire Dales (1992). Giggleswick: Castleberg.

• Locomotives Seen on the Settle-Carlisle (1992) Giggleswick: Castleberg.

• The Lost Village of Stocks-in-Bowland (1992) Giggleswick: Castleberg.

• Three Peaks and Malhamdale (Walker's Guide) (1992). Clapham (North Yorks.):Dalesman.

• Yorkshire Laughter/Native Wit and Humour (1992). ) Giggleswick: Castleberg.

• After You, Mr. Wainwright: In the Fell Country of Lakeland (1992) Giggleswick: Castleberg.

• Finlay MacQueen of St.Kilda (1992) Oban: Oban Times.

• Ribblehead Re-born (1992) Giggleswick: Castleberg.

• Hotfoot to Haworth: Pilgrims to the Bronte Shrine (1992) Giggleswick: Castleberg.

• After You, Mr Wainwright. In the Fell Country of Lakeland (1992) Giggleswick: Castleberg.

• A Walk Through the Yorkshire Dales (1992) Clapham (North Yorks.): Dalesman.

• Bill Mitchell's Yorkshire (1993) Clapham (North Yorks.):Dalesman.

• Men Who Made the Settle-Carlisle (1993) Giggleswick: Castleberg.

• A Popular History of Settle and Giggleswick (1993) Giggleswick: Castleberg.

• Bowland and Pendle (Walker's Guide) (1993) Clapham (North Yorks.): Dalesman.

• The Lost Village of Mardale (1993) Giggleswick: Castleberg.

• Lakeland Laughter: Native Wit & Humour (1993) Giggleswick: Castleberg.

• The Great Yorkshire Joke Book (1994) Clapham (North Yorks.):Dalesman.

• The Life and Traditions of the Ribble Valley (1994) Giggleswick: Castleberg.

• Settle to Carlisle, The Middle Route to Scotland, a Railway over the Pennines (1994). Clapham (North Yorks.):Dalesman (reprinted by Kingfisher).

• Settle to Carlisle; a Railway over the Pennines (1994) Clapham (North Yorks.):Dalesman.

• Yorkshire Curiosities (1994) Clapham (North Yorks.):Dalesman.

• A Passion for Puffins (1994) Giggleswick: Castleberg.

• Ingleborough: The Big Blue Hill (1994) Giggleswick: Castleberg.

• Best Yorkshire Quotations(1994) Clapham (North Yorks.): Dalesman.

• A Merry Yorkshire Christmas (1994) Clapham (North Yorks.): Dalesman.

• Letters from the Dales (1994) Giggleswick: Castleberg.

• Letters from the Lakes (1995) Giggleswick: Castleberg.

• Dent: The Highest Mainline Station in England (1995) Giggleswick: Castleberg.

• Ghost Hunting in the Yorkshire Dales (1996). Giggleswick: Castleberg.

• The Wasdale Monster (1996) Giggleswick: Castleberg.

• The Stocks Revisited (1996) Giggleswick: Castleberg.

• The Walker's Guide to Central Lakeland (1996) Clapham (North Yorks.): Dalesman.

• Yorkshire Humour (1996) London: Hale.

• Lake District Insight (Compact Guide ) (1997) London: APA Publications.

• The Walker's Guide to South-east Lakeland (1997). Clapham (North Yorks.): Dalesman.

• You're Only Old once (1997). London: Hale.

• Mile by Mile on the Settle-Carlisle (1997) Giggleswick: Castleberg.

• Music of the Yorkshire Dales (1997) Giggleswick: Castleberg.

• Beatrix Potter: Her Life in the Lake District (1998) Giggleswick: Castleberg.

• Summat and Nowt: Memories of a Yorkshire Editor (1998) Giggleswick: Castleberg.

• Garsdale: History of a Station on the Settle-Carlisle Railway (1999) Giggleswick: Castleberg.

• The Story of the Yorkshire Dales (1999) Chichester: Phillimore & Co.

• Edith Carr: Life on Malham Moor (1999) Giggleswick: Castleberg.

• Tot Lord and the Bone Caves (1999) Giggleswick: Castleberg.

• A Walk Through the Yorkshire Dales (1999) Clapham (North Yorks.): Dalesman.

• Birds of the Lake District (2000) Giggleswick: Castleberg.

• Nobbut Middlin'. Laugh with the Dalesfolk (2000) Giggleswick: Castleberg.

• A History of Leeds (2000) Chichester: Phillimore & Co.

• One Hundred Tales of the Settle to Carlisle Railway (2000) Giggleswick: Castleberg.

• Walker's Guide to North-east Lakeland (2001) Skipton: Dalesman.

• How They Lived in the Yorkshire Dales (2001) Giggleswick: Castleberg.

• Watch the Birdie. The Life and Times of Richard and Cherry Kearton,: Pioneers of Wildlife Photography (2001) Giggleswick: Castleberg.

• Reginald Farrer: At home in the Yorkshire Dales (2002) Giggleswick: Castleberg.

• Living Moors of Yorkshire (2002) Giggleswick: Castleberg.

• How They Lived in the Lake District (2002) Giggleswick: Castleberg.

• Dalesfolk and Dialect (2003) Giggleswick: Castleberg.

• Kit Calvert: Yorkshire Dalesman (2003) Giggleswick: Castleberg.

• Destination Rum. : Tales from the Forbidden Island (2003) Giggleswick: Castleberg.

• Bowland and Pendle Hill (2004) Chichester: Phillimore & Co.

• Farm Life in the Lakeland Dales (2005) Weymouth: Waterfront Publications.

• Brackengarth (2005) Giggleswick: Castleberg.

• Keswick and Northern Lakeland (with R.G.K. Gudgeon) (2005) Skipton: Dales Country Publishing.

• Skipton and the Craven Dales (2006) Chichester: Phillimore & Co.

• Connections : artists and writers in North Craven (foreword by W R Mitchell) (2007) Settle: North Craven Building Preservation Trust.

• The Lost Shanties of Ribblehead (2007) Giggleswick: Castleberg.

• The Eden Valley and North Pennines (2007) Chichester: Phillimore & Co.

• James Herriot in conversation with WR Mitchell (2007) Giggleswick: Castleberg.

• Hannah Hauxwell - 80 Years in the Dales (2008) Ilkley: Great Northern Books.

• Thunder in the Mountains: The Men Who Built Ribblehead (2009) Ilkley: Great Northern Books.

• Wainwright: Milltown to Mountain (2009). Ilkley: Great Northern Books.

• The Lune Valley and the Howgill Fells: The Impact of the Second World War on British Children (2009) Chichester: Phillimore & Co.

• Beatrix Potter: Her Lakeland Years (2010) Ilkley: Great Northern Books. ISBN 978-1905080717.

• Herriot - A Vet's Life (2010) Ilkley: Great Northern Books (Forewords by Christopher Timothy and James Herriot). ISBN 978-1905080779.

• Settle’s Victorian Music Hall (and other editors) (n/d) Settle: Settle Amateur Operatic Society.

- Arthur Ransome: Afloat in Lakeland (2015) : Ilkley: Great Northern Books
- Folk Tales on the Settle-Carlisle Railway (2015) : Fonthill Media
- Lake District Folk (2015) : Fonthill Media

=== Booklets ===
All printed by Pen Press:

Yorkshire Courtship (2011)

From the Yorkshire Dales to Salt Lake City (2012)

Life on t'Back Street (2013)

Pulpit Tales of the Yorkshire Dales (2013)

Peter Delap: Doctor and Deerologist

Peggy Ellwood: Life on a Lakeland Farm

=== Film Commentaries ===
Villages of the Lake District. DVD. Settle: Kingfisher.

Villages of the Yorkshire Dales. DVD. Settle: Kingfisher.

Lake District In The Past. DVD. Settle: Kingfisher.
