= Dalesman =

British monthly regional magazine

The Yorkshire Dalesman
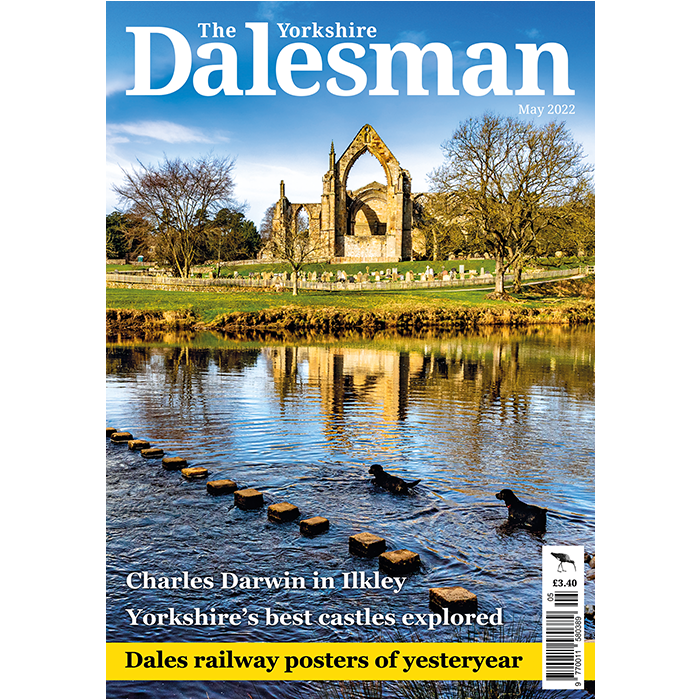
- A typical front cover
- Editor: Mick Smith
- Former editors: See editors section below
- Frequency: Monthly
- Circulation: 28,217
- Publisher: Country Publications
- Founded: 1939
- Country: United Kingdom
- Based in: Skipton
- Language: English
- Website: www.dalesman.co.uk
- ISSN: 0011-5800

Dalesman is a British monthly regional magazine, based in Skipton, covering the English county of Yorkshire. Its first edition was published in March 1939, under the original title of The Yorkshire Dalesman: A Monthly Magazine of Dales' Life and Industry.

Although originally only serving the Yorkshire Dales, the magazine later expanded to cover all of Yorkshire, focusing on the countryside. It is the biggest selling regional consumer magazine in the UK and Yorkshire's best-selling magazine.

== Content ==
The magazine covers the people, landscapes and heritage of Yorkshire. Dalesman covers the whole of Yorkshire, though it has a rural focus that takes in the Yorkshire Dales, North York Moors, Yorkshire Wolds and Yorkshire coast, along with the county capital of York. Issues contain articles on crafts, history and nature, alongside photographs and paintings of Yorkshire scenery.

Along with factual features and interviews, there are also short stories, puzzles, guided walks, plus numerous jokes and cartoons, some in Yorkshire dialect. The magazine has a Reader's Club.

Notable writers have contributed to Dalesman, including J. B. Priestley, Ella Pontefract, Bill Cowley and Alan Bennett. Current regular contributors include "Bard of Barnsley" Ian McMillan, Nicholas Rhea, who wrote the Constable books that the TV series Heartbeat was based on, Ashley Jackson, and cartoonists Tony Husband and Karl Dixon.

Monthly features include Diary of a Yorkshire Farmer's Wife, Signs and Wonders (amusing signs spotted around Yorkshire), Wild Yorkshire, My Best Day Out and Round About the Ridings. Aside from A Dalesman's Diary – which has been included from issue one – the magazine's longest-running feature is the Old Amos cartoon.

The cartoon has been a fixture in Dalesman since May 1953, making Old Amos four years older than fellow northern cartoon character Andy Capp. Two artists have drawn Old Amos over the last six decades: father and son Rowland and Pete Lindup. Pete carried on immediately after Rowland's death in 1989. Old Amos is a bearded gentleman who dishes out quotable wisdom and advice, often in Yorkshire dialect.

== History ==
Initially called The Yorkshire Dalesman, the magazine was founded in 1939 by former Leeds journalist Harry J. Scott, with the first edition published in April of that year. He ran the magazine from the front room of his home in the small Dales village of Clapham, North Yorkshire.

Writing in the first issue, Scott remarked: "Although it may require a word of explanation, the appearance of the first number of a magazine devoted to the Yorkshire Dales needs no apology. The surprising thing is that Dales lovers should have lacked a magazine for so long." He continued: "It is to serve the interests of this great community that "The Yorkshire Dalesman" has been founded, ending: "On this programme, I offer this first number of 'The Yorkshire Dalesman' for your consideration, pleading only for its many shortcomings that no magazine reaches maturity in its first number."

Also writing in that first edition was J. B. Priestley: "I am glad to learn that our beloved Dales are to have their own magazine and I wish the venture the success it deserves". He described his love of Yorkshire's "high hills and grey-green valleys and lovely peace", adding: "So please see that your new magazine fights to keep them all unspoilt."

After eight years of publication, Scott expanded the coverage of the magazine to the entirety of Yorkshire due to public pressure. In March 1947, the editor wrote: "We have decided that from our next number The Yorkshire Dalesman, while giving no less space each month than in the past to the western dales, shall be enlarged to include all the Yorkshire countryside, the moors and dales of north-east Yorkshire, the hills of Cleveland, the cloughs and valleys of the Yorkshire-Lancashire border, the Plain of York and the high moorlands of Teesdale, no less than the rolling lands of Bowland and the fells and dales of the western Pennines."

A year later, the magazine's title was changed to The Dalesman. By then, the circulation had reached 13,000 and Scott wrote in March 1948: "It has been a mark of the pleasant friendly bond which has always existed between this magazine and its readers and almost from our first appearance our title was shortened in conversation, in letters and over bookstall counters to "The Dalesman". "Has The Dalesman come yet?" is a familiar phrase in most Yorkshire villages. It would ill become us, therefore, after such friendly treatment, to insist on our full name and title, and we have decided to accept, gratefully, our readers' choice. From our next issue, which is the first of our tenth year, we shall become simply and plainly The Dalesman. This will imply no change in style or policy. It will give us greater scope to look over the Yorkshire border on occasion and hobnob with our neighbours."

In 1955, the Dalesman expanded to new offices were opened elsewhere in the village. It remained in Clapham until 2000. The magazine is now produced near its original home, in offices at Skipton Castle.

The second editor was W. R. ("Bill") Mitchell, who worked with Scott before taking the editor's chair. Mitchell remembers meeting the "tweed-clad, pipe-smoking" Scott in the offices of the Craven Herald newspaper in Skipton, shortly before he joined the magazine. Scott's signature greeting was 'Hail to thee, Blithe Spirit'. After working as the editor, Mitchell was awarded the MBE for his services to journalism in Yorkshire and Cumbria. He was admitted by the University of Bradford to the Honorary Degree of Doctor of Letters. He has also received the Golden Eagle Award from the Outdoor Writers' and Photographers' Guild, which cited him as one of the founding fathers of outdoor writing.

When Mitchell retired in 1988, he was the subject of a Yorkshire Television documentary narrated by playwright Alan Bennett, who concluded the programme by saying: "The Dalesman has proved to be something of a river; it just goes flowing on – and like a river it is, I hope, unstoppable."

In 2026, Iconic Media Group acquired the magazine. At that time the publication had 17,000 subscribers.

== Editors ==
There have been nine editors since the Dalesman was founded in 1939.

- Harry J. Scott, 1939–1968
- William Reginald Mitchell, 1968–1988
- David Joy, 1988–1994
- Terry Fletcher, 1994–2008
- Paul Jackson, 2008–2012
- Adrian Braddy, 2012–2019
- Jon Stokoe, 2019–2021
- Dan Clare, 2021–2022
- Mick Smith, 2022–present
