= Gibbet Moor =

Hill in the Peak District of England

Coordinates: 53°13′50″N 1°34′32″W

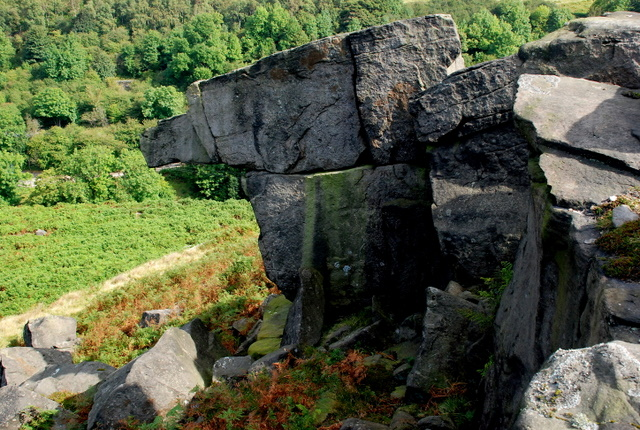
Rock outcrop on Gibbet Moor

Gibbet Moor is a small gritstone upland area in the Derbyshire Peak District of central and northern England, near the village of Baslow. Its highest point is 295 metres (968 ft) above sea level. The Chatsworth Estate lies to the west and Umberley Brook runs along its east edge. East Moor is the broader moorland area covering Gibbet Moor, Brampton East Moor and Beeley Moor. Gibbet Moor is a prehistoric landscape with several protected scheduled monuments.

A gibbet was a wooden structure (like a gallows), where the dead bodies of criminals were hung on display. The last person to be gibbeted alive in England was a vagrant who was begging for food around Baslow and killed a woman in her cottage. The murderer was left to die in a gibbet cage on Gibbet Moor in the 17th century.

A widespread Bronze Age settlement covers a stretch of moorland over 1 km long. The complex includes a stone circle, more than 250 cairns, cemeteries of burial mounds (barrows) and remains of field enclosures and building platforms of probable farm houses. The stone circle has an outer ring of standing stones about 10m in diameter, with an inner square of standing stones (with three of the "four poster" stones remaining). The historic landscape has been modified by World War II training exercises. The site is a scheduled monument. To the west of the large prehistoric settlement is another cairnfield and field system, which is a separate scheduled monument. This formed part of the same Bronze Age cultivation landscape but was separated by more recent land enclosures. A Bronze Age cairn cemetery on the eastern edge of the moor is a further scheduled monument. The largest cairn is 10m long with at least seven other cairns nearby.

Hob Hurst's House is an unusual square Bronze Age burial cairn on Harland Edge (between Gibbet Moor and Beeley Moor). Thomas Bateman excavated the barrow in 1853 and discovered a stone cist containing cremated remains. It has been a protected national monument since 1882.

Until 1824 Gibbet Moor was common land and then the Baslow Inclosure Act 1823 (4 Geo. 4. c. 30 Pr.) allocated the land of Gibbet Moor to the Duke of Rutland. In an exchange of lands, the 6th Duke of Devonshire acquired the 652 acres of Gibbet Moor to extend his Chatsworth Estate to the east.

Gibbet Moor became "Open Access" land for the public, following the Countryside and Rights of Way Act 2000. The Peak District Boundary Walk runs along the track on the west side of the moor. The area can be accessed by a track from the A619 road.
