= Dennis Marks (music director) =

British music director (1948–2015)

Dennis Michael Marks (2 July 1948 – 2 April 2015), was head of music at BBC Television in the 1980s and from 1993 to 1997 was general director of English National Opera. He was also a maker of television documentaries, broadcaster and author.

== Early career ==
Marks was born to Jewish parents; his father was the son of immigrants from Ukraine. Brought up in Harrow, London, Marks was educated at Haberdashers' Aske's Boys' School and Trinity College, Cambridge. Originally he hoped for a career in the theatre and was a member of the National Youth Theatre. Obtaining a job, originally as a researcher, at the BBC, he became a director and producer of television arts programmes. While making a programme in 1972 about Shandy Hall (home of the writer Laurence Sterne), he met the writer Michael Frayn and the two became lifelong friends. Leaving the BBC to work as an independent producer, Marks was invited back by Alan Yentob and eventually became Head of Music Programmes at the BBC. During this time he became involved in opera, including directing television versions of Michael Tippett's New Year and Mark-Anthony Turnage's Greek.

== At the ENO ==
In 1993 Marks succeeded Peter Jonas as General Director of English National Opera (ENO). He inherited financial problems (the company already had a deficit of over £3 million) and a roster of new productions which initially drew low audiences and poor critical reception, including a controversial production of Alfred Schnittke's Life with an Idiot. However, Marks wrote, "At ENO I was surprised and delighted to discover that the elusive force known as 'word of mouth' can overcome even the most savage press reactions. More than one show panned by the press still played to full houses and put two fingers up to its detractors." Although audiences increased, particularly for a well-received production of Carmen, and revenues improved, Marks found himself increasingly at odds with the ENO board of directors, especially over his proposals to move the company's home from the expensive and elderly London Coliseum theatre to a new build out of the central London area. These disagreements, and lack of cogent funding proposals from the Arts Council, led to his resignation in 1997.

== Later career ==
After leaving the ENO, Marks devoted himself to writing, broadcasting and travelling. In 2004 he scripted and directed a filmed version, with the tenor Ian Bostridge and the soprano Ruby Philogene, of Leoš Janáček's song cycle, The Diary of One Who Disappeared, and was a lead presenter of an entire day dedicated to Janáček on BBC Radio 3. In 2011 he published a book about the writer Joseph Roth. In a 2013 radio programme for BBC Radio 4, Little Moscow in Israel, Marks examined the effects of the immigration of Russian Jews to Israel. Although already seriously ill, Marks was in the audience for the new ENO production of Wagner's The Mastersingers shortly before his death.

== Notes ==
=== Sources ===
- Anon, (2015). "Dennis Marks, BBC head of music – obituary", The Daily Telegraph, 4 April 2015. Retrieved 4 April 2015.
- Gilbert, Susie (2011). Opera for Everybody: The Story of English National Opera. London: Faber & Faber. ISBN 978-0571268658.
- Goodwin, Noël (1993). "New faces 3: Dennis Marks", in Opera, February 1993. Retrieved 4 April 2015.
- Lister, David (1995). "English National Opera: something had to give", The Independent, 11 November 1995. Retrieved 4 April 2015.
- Lister, David (1997). "Arts: Opera drama as director of ENO leaves post", The Independent, 20 September 1997. Retrieved 4 April 2015.
- Marks, Dennis (n.d.). "I Know What I Like", dennismarks.net blog. Retrieved 4 April 2015.
- Marks, Dennis (2011). Wandering Jew: The Search for Joseph Roth. London: Notting Hill Editions. ISBN 978-1907903045 .
- Rozner, Gina (1999). "How we met: Dennis Marks & Michael Frayn", The Independent, 26 December 1999. Retrieved 4 April 2015.
