= Craven Herald & Pioneer =

Weekly newspaper in North Yorkshire, England

- Type: Weekly newspaper
- Format: Broadsheet until 29 October 2009; Tabloid from 5 November 2009
- Owner: Newsquest
- Publisher: Newsquest Bradford
- Editor: Nigel Burton
- Founded: 1853
- Headquarters: Skipton, North Yorkshire
- Circulation: 3,996 (as of 2023)
- ISSN: 0961-1908
- OCLC number: 751637778
- Website: cravenherald.co.uk

The Craven Herald & Pioneer is a weekly newspaper covering the Craven area of North Yorkshire as well as part of the Pendle area of Lancashire. Until 29 October 2009 it remained one of only two weekly papers in the United Kingdom that continued to have a front page consisting wholly of advertisements. On 22 October 2009 it was announced that the edition on 29 October 2009 would be the last broadsheet edition with adverts on the front cover. From 5 November 2009 the format was changed to a tabloid size, or compact as the then-editor described it, with news on page one and the adverts moved to page two.

== History ==
There have been several newspapers covering the Craven area. The Craven Herald was first published in 1853, in Skipton, by Robert Tasker, a local printer. Originally a monthly publication, it ran until 1868 when Tasker became postmaster of Skipton and, as such, was debarred from publishing a newspaper.

In 1865 the Craven Weekly Pioneer and General Advertiser for West Yorkshire and East Lancashire was launched. This was a paper of very liberal leanings being an enthusiastic supporter of William Ewart Gladstone. In response the local Conservatives bought Tasker's firm and in 1875 re-launched the Craven Herald.

Both papers continued to publish separately and both underwent name changes at various times. The Craven Herald changed its name to the Craven Herald and Wensleydale Standard in 1868 before reverting to the Craven Herald in 1922. Meanwhile the Pioneer became the West Yorkshire Pioneer and East Lancashire News in 1884 and the West Yorkshire Pioneer in 1934. The two rivals merged in 1937 to form the Craven Herald & Pioneer.

The Craven Herald was an early user of photographs in the paper. The first example, of a society wedding, appeared in 1905.

In 1987, financial pressures forced the owners of the paper to sell to Westminster Press, the publishers of the Bradford Telegraph and Argus. Westminster Press itself was sold to Newsquest in 1996.

Until 1995 the paper was printed in Skipton but after a Westminster Press decision to centralise printing, moved to Bradford, although the editorial and advertising offices remain in Skipton.

In 2001 the paper broke with its tradition and suspended adverts on the front page for one edition to use a photograph to report the arrival of foot and mouth disease in Craven.

While it remained a broadsheet publication, the front page remained resolutely advertising although in 2008 changes were made to preview the main news story in a 12 column inch (3 inches by 4 columns) box on the front page.

== Current status ==
In the January – December 2013 ABC audit, the average net circulation per issue was 11,498. By the January to December 2016 season, this had dropped to 9,377 average weekly circulation. The present editor is Andrew Hitchon. Styling itself The Voice of the Dales since 1853 it is now published every Thursday and carries some colour photographs on the inside. As of February 2024 the cover price is £1.40.

From 5 November 2009 the paper is printed in a tabloid format with news on the front page and the adverts formerly carried on page one moved to page two.
