= Beeley Moor =

Hill in the Peak District of England

Coordinates: 53°12′36″N 1°33′54″W

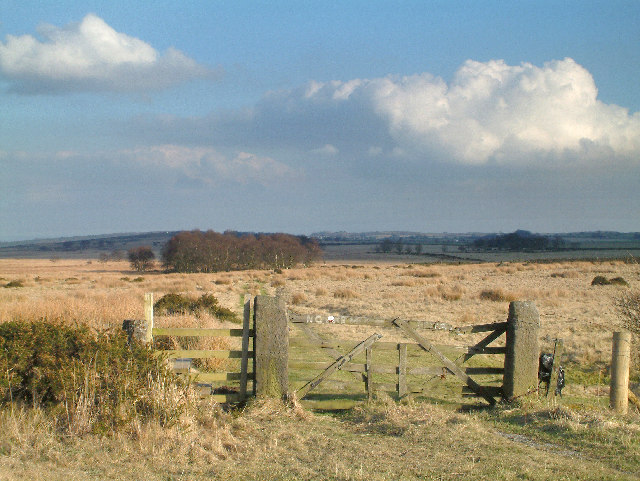
Southern edge of Beeley Moor

Beeley Moor is a small gritstone upland area in the Derbyshire Peak District of central and northern England, near the villages of Beeley and Baslow. Its highest point is 371 metres (1,217 ft) above sea level.

== Geography ==
The Chatsworth Estate lies to the north west. East Moor is the broader moorland area covering Gibbet Moor, Brampton East Moor and Beeley Moor.The River Hipper's source is on Beeley Moor at Hipper Sick. Beeley Brook also drains from the moor and features several cascades as it runs to Beeley village.

== History ==
Beeley Moor is a prehistoric landscape with many protected scheduled monuments including individual cairns, cairn fields, burial mounds and guidestones.

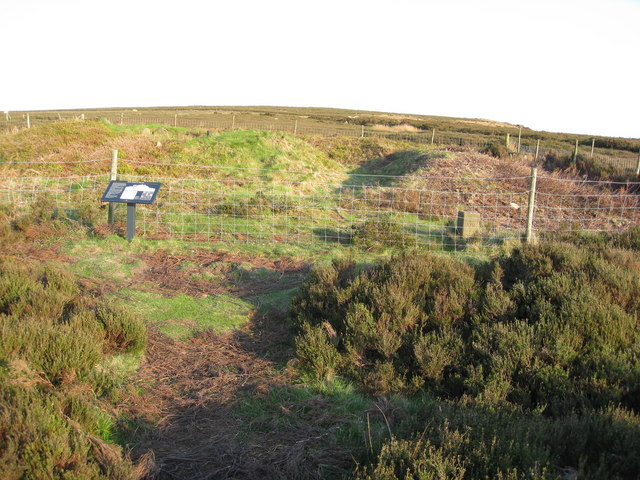
Hob Hurst's House

Hob Hurst's House is an unusual square Bronze Age burial cairn on Harland Edge (between Gibbet Moor and Beeley Moor). Thomas Bateman excavated the barrow in 1853 and discovered a stone cist containing cremated remains. It has been a protected national monument since 1882. The site was named after a goblin who was supposed to have lived there.

Three hundred years ago coal was mined on Beeley Moor for lead-smelting and for local homes. Chatsworth House was built from the high quality gritstone quarried on the moor. Beeley Moor was also renowned for grouse shooting.

== Murders ==
In 1977 a prisoner escaped by stabbing his guards whilst being driven to court during a blizzard on the moors. The convict held a family hostage in their home on Beeley Moor for three days. He systematically killed four of the five family members. He was shot dead by police when he tried to flee in the family's car and crashed. The Pottery Cottage murders shocked the British public.

== Access ==
Beeley Moor became "Open Access" land for the public, following the Countryside and Rights of Way Act 2000. The area can be accessed from Beeley Village by footpaths through Beeley Plantation.
