= London Associated Electricity Undertakings Limited =

- Company type: Public limited company
- Industry: Energy: Electricity supply
- Predecessor: See text
- Founded: February 1935
- Defunct: 31 March 1948
- Fate: Nationalisation
- Successor: British Electricity Authority, London Electricity Board
- Headquarters: London
- Area served: Central and West London
- Key people: see text
- Services: Electricity supply

London Associated Electricity Undertakings Limited was an electricity supply company that operated in central and west London from 1935 to 1948. It was founded to acquire, combine and coordinate the electricity distribution interests of six west London electricity companies.

== History ==
The London Power Company was established in 1925 by ten London electricity undertakings to centralise the generation of electricity at Battersea Power Station. The constituent companies continued as electricity distribution and sales undertakings.

In 1934, six electricity supply companies in west and central London wished to bring the distribution resources of their constituent companies together into one organisation. This was to standardise and improve the effectiveness and efficiency of electricity supplies in a single organisation. The six constituent companies were the:

- Brompton and Kensington Electricity Supply Company
- Charing Cross Electricity Supply Company
- Chelsea Electricity Supply Company
- Kensington and Knightsbridge Electric Lighting Company
- St. James and Pall Mall Electric Light Company
- Westminster Electricity Supply Corporation

The London Associated Electricity Undertakings Limited was registered as a public company in February 1935. This was under the provisions of the London Electricity (No. 2) Act 1925 (14 & 15 Geo. 5. c. lxiii). The undertaking's declared policy was:

1. To build up a single effective organisation in place of the six existing organisations;
2. To secure as soon as possible the greatest uniformity in tariffs on the lowest basis attainable;
3. To make the best possible speed towards the completion of the engineering programme of the companies in adopting the standard system laid down by the Central Electricity Board.

The administrative mechanism to achieve integration was for the Charing Cross Electricity Supply Company to take over the other five companies and to change its name to Central London Electricity Limited. With effect from 1 January 1937 the whole of the shares of Central London Electricity Limited were held by the non-statutory body London Associated Electricity Undertakings Limited. Compensation to directors of the constituent companies was set at three years gross fees for loss of office.

The company was able to standardise electricity supplies (240 V, 50 Hz AC) in the combined area and reduced costs significantly. However, the company was unable to attract further companies to the merger.

The war years (1939–45) were difficult for the company. The sale of electricity fell by 30 per cent; the number of consumers fell by 39 per cent and the electrical load by 37.5 per cent. Tariffs had to be increased in 1940 and 1943. The amount of war damage was estimated to be £600,000, with bulk supply sub-stations damaged on 55 occasions and 139 transformer chambers and 1,424 cables were damaged. Recovery began in 1944 with increases in both sales and the number of consumers.

In 1948 the London Associated Electricity Undertakings Limited and Central London Electricity Limited head office was at 60 St. Martins Lane. There were showrooms at: 143/7 Regent Street; 31 Belgrave Road; 254 Earl's Court Road; 147 Sloane Street; and 12 Victoria Street.

The London Associated Electricity Undertakings Limited and Central London Electricity Limited were abolished on 31 March 1948 under the terms of the Electricity Act 1947 (10 & 11 Geo. 6. c. 54) which nationalised the British electricity supply industry. The company's high voltage bulk electricity transmission systems were vested in the British Electricity Authority. The local distribution systems and the electricity sales functions were vested in the London Electricity Board (LEB).

== Key people ==
Chairmen of London Associated Electricity Undertakings Limited were:

- Edward Goulding, 1st Baron Wargrave, 1935–1936
- Sir Frances Fladgate, 1936–37
- Victor Bulwer-Lytton, 2nd Earl of Lytton, 1937–47
- Clarence Parker, 1947–48

== Electricity supply statistics ==
The electricity supply statistics for the six constituent companies in 1936, the final year of independent operation, were as follows.

Company	Electricity sold, MWh	Maximum load, MW	Connection, MW	No. of consumers
Brompton and Kensington	21,433	9.30	51.056	14,722
Charing Cross	116,454	48.988	119.731	11,614
Chelsea	37,729	10.350	55.131	11,462
Kensington and Knightsbridge	40,100	14.320	64.258	7,903
St James and Pall Mall	56,116	22.111	55.665	6,045
Westminster	124,249	47.766	200.450	28,607

Operating data for the London Associated Electricity Undertakings Limited and Central London Electricity Limited was as shown.

Year	Electricity sold, MWh	Connections, MW	No. of Consumers
1934	314,000	450	–
1935	350,000	489	–
1936	386,000	–	–
1937	419,000	592	–
1938	432,000	–	86,000
1939–42	No accounts published during the war		
1943	303,000	–	53,000
1944	348,000	–	76,684
1945	382,250	–	83,800
1946	450,000	–	90,600
1947	433,000	–	–

== Finances ==
The combined share capital of the constituent companies in 1935 was £6,892,194. The London Associated Electricity Undertakings Limited was able to carry out the amalgamation for £7,300.

The electricity tariffs and operational revenue was as follows.

Year	Tariff, d./kWh	Revenue, £
1934	1.804	2,460,000
1935	1.682	2,500,000
1936	1.624	2,658,600
1937	0.5	2,782,600
1938	1.451	–
1944	–	+487,000
1945	–	+364,000
1946	–	+394,000
1947	–	–221,000

== See also ==
- List of pre-nationalisation UK electric power companies
- Timeline of the UK electricity supply industry
