= Grove Road Power Station =

Electricity generating station

- Country: England, United Kingdom
- Location: Lisson Grove, London
- Coordinates: 51°31′39″N 00°10′15″W
- Status: Decommissioned and demolished
- Construction began: 1900
- Commission date: November 1902
- Decommission date: 1969
- Owners: Central Electric Supply Company (1902–1925); London Power Company (1925–1948); British Electricity Authority (1948–1955); Central Electricity Authority (1955–1957); Central Electricity Generating Board (1958–1973)
- Operator: As owner

Thermal power station
- Primary fuel: Coal (until 1964), oil (from 1964)
- Site area: 3 hectare
- Chimneys: 1
- Cooling towers: 14 (wooden)
- Cooling source: Recirculating water cooling towers

Power generation
- Units operational: 3 × 18.75 MW and 2 × 12 MW
- Make and model: British Thomson-Houston 6.6 kV
- Units decommissioned: All
- Nameplate capacity: 80.25 MW
- Annual net output: See text

Grove Road power station was an 80.25 MW electricity generating station that operated from 1902 until it was closed in 1969. It was an early example of the co-operation between London electricity companies to centralise electricity generation in a shared, relatively large-scale, and therefore more efficient, power station. The site is now occupied by two major high-voltage electricity sub-stations.

== History ==
The Central Electric Supply Company was founded in June 1897. It was promoted by two existing statutory electricity undertakings: the Westminster Electric Supply Corporation and the St. James' and Pall Mall Electric Lighting Company. The St. James’ Company had commenced electricity generation and supply to its area of north Westminster in April 1889 and the Westminster Corporation to north and south Westminster in November 1890. Electricity was generated in several small-scale power stations within the companies area of supply, but they wished to produce electricity in bulk. The companies were the main shareholders of the Central Company which obtained legislative powers in 1899 to supply electricity to the two founding companies.

== Description ==
The Central Electric Supply Company established a 22 MW coal-fired power station on a 7.5 acre (3.0 hectare) site off Grove Road (now Lisson Grove). The site is immediately to the north of the Regent’s Canal and south-east of Lord’s Cricket Ground. The architects of the buildings were Charles Stanley Peach and Sir Charles Herbert Reilly. The boiler house and turbine hall were orientated north-west to south-east, and there was a single, square, ornate brick chimney. Although named Grove Road the main frontage of the power station was on the south side of Lodge Road (formerly Lodge Place).

Coal for the power station was delivered to a dedicated siding off the adjacent Great Central Railway. There was a large coal store to the south-west of the power station. The station was notable for the field of 14 wooden cooling towers to the south-west of the site.

== Operation ==
Electricity supplies from Grove Road power station began in November 1902. In the first year of operations (1903) the Central Company sold 2.60 MWh of electricity.

From 1912 the Central Company also supplied current in bulk to the Chelsea Electricity Supply Company. The electricity generating capacity of the companies, and how this changed over time is demonstrated in the following table. There was, as intended, a decline in local electricity generation and a move towards central production.

Electricity company generating capacity
	Electricity generating capacity, MW			
	St. James	Westminster	Chelsea	Central
1898	2.82	4.53	1.86	—
1903	5.50	10.65	(3.30)	7.02
1904				8.58
1913	10.2	17.81	3.50	14.68
1920	3.22	9.82	3.4	20.20
1923	0	8.10	0.60	50.00
1933	0	0	0	Part of LPC

In 1903, the station had installed 10 climax boilers of the vertical design powering Willans & Robinson engines. These drove generating plant comprising three each of General Electric Co 1,560 kW and 780 kW sets all generating at 6,000 volts, 46 cycles per second. The plant was supplemented later in 1904 by the addition of a Bellis & Morcom engine powering an AEG 1,560 kW alternator.

In 1912, further equipment was installed in Grove Road to increase the generating capacity to 40 MW.

In 1923, the Central Electric Company’s generating plant at Grove Road comprised 1 × 3.0 MW, 2 × 6.0 MW and 2 × 10.0 MW turbo generators. The maximum load on the system was 25.050 MW. The total steam output capacity of the boilers was 557,400 lb/hr (70.2 kg/s). The company generated 51,102 MWh during 1923.

In 1923, the St. James Company provided a 110 & 220 V DC supply, and a single phase 105 V 85 Hz AC supply, the maximum load was 8,871 kW. It generated just 21.785 MWh in 1923, and sold a total of 15,826 MWh raising a revenue of £279,137.

In 1923, the Westminster Company provided a 400/440 V DC only supply. The generating plant comprised 2 × 300 kW, 3 × 1000 kW, 1 × 1500 kW and 1 × 3000 kW turbo generators, the maximum load was 18,702 kW. It generated 11,906 MWh in 1923, and sold a total of 30,261 MWh raising £458,682 in revenue.

In 1929, the plant contained eight 3 phase, 50 Hz, 6600 volt British Thompson-Houston turbo alternators 4 x 18,750 kW, 2 x 12,000 kW, 2 x 7,000 kW which were supplied with steam from no less than 21 boilers with a total evaporative capacity of 1,130,000 Ib/hr.

In 1923, the Chelsea Company provided a 200 & 400 V DC only supply. The generating plant comprised 2 × 80 kW, 4 × 150 kW, 6 × 200 kW and 2 × 420 reciprocating generators and 3 × 200 kW oil driven machines. In 1923 it generated 3,060 MWh, and sold 5,268 MWh raising a revenue of £122,240.

Bulk electricity supplies from Grove Road were transmitted at 6.6 kV, 3-phase, 50 Hz. Local supplies were of Direct Current (DC) at 200–400 V. In 1915 the Central Company supplied up to 10.7 MW to the Westminster company via Motor-generator sets, and 2.2 MW to St. James. In the mid-1920s the bulk supply voltage was increased to 22 kV. The generating and transforming capacity for undertakings acquiring bulk supplies; and the amount of electricity generated and imported (from Grove Road) in 1923 were:

Electricity company capacity, generation and import
	St. James	Westminster	Chelsea	Central (Grove Road)
Generating capacity, MW	0	8.10	0.60	50.00
Transforming capacity, MW	13.49	23.70	4.50	̶
Electricity generated, MWh	0	13.24	1.04	59.71
Electricity imported, MWh	23.12	31.25	5.67	̶

Under the London Electricity (No. 2) Act 1925 (14 & 15 Geo. 5. c. lxiii) the St. James, Westminster, Chelsea, Central Company, and others, became part of the London Power Company (LPC). The companies continued to reduce the generation of electricity from small local power stations and purchased electricity supplies from the LPC. In 1925 the London Power Company embarked on a plan to modernise Grove Road power station. The peak generating capacity of Grove Road was increased to 80.25 MW; this is in the context of the LPC’s major generating stations: Battersea rated at 343 MW (in 1935) and 503 MW (1955) and Deptford at 448 MW.

It was reported in 1930 that experimental work had been carried out at Grove Road power station into eliminating sulphur oxides from the flue gases. Under working condition removal of 95 per cent of sulphur oxides was claimed. This work was in the context of the ongoing construction of Battersea power station which required flue-gas treatment facilities to be provided.

The Central Electric Supply Company was legally dissolved in October 1932 as its functions to supply electricity had been subsumed by the LPC.

Upon nationalisation of the British electricity industry in 1948 ownership of Grove Road station was transferred to the British Electricity Authority (1948–55), then to the Central Electricity Authority (1955–57), and finally to the Central Electricity Generating Board (1958–69).

The generating capacity of Grove Road power station in 1964 was still 80.25 MW. There were 3 × 18.75 MW and 2 × 12 MW British Thomson-Houston turbo-alternators. The chain-grate boilers had a steam capacity of 895,000 lb/hr (112.8 kg/s). The steam pressure at the turbine stop valves was 210 psi (14.45 bar) 357/371 °C. In 1954 the station burned 81,400 tons of coal. In 1964–65 the boilers were modified for oil firing to take advantage of relatively cheap oil in this period. By 1968 some electricity plant had been retired and the generating capability of the power station had been reduced to 37.5 MW; the thermal efficiency was 12.59 percent (in 1961) and 9.18 per cent (in 1968). The electricity output of Grove Road power station in its final years was as follows.

Grove Road annual electricity output GWh

== Decommissioning ==
The electricity generating plant at Grove Road power station was decommissioned in 1969. The power station buildings were demolished in 1973.

The Grove Road site is now the location of two major electricity sub-stations. It is at the southern end of the 400 kV Elstree to St John’s Wood transmission cable tunnel and is also a 132 kV sub-station, part of the London power distribution network.

== Other uses ==
In October 1960, the photographer Terence Donovan undertook a fashion shoot called ‘Thermodynamic’ for Man About Town Magazine at Grove Road Power Station.

In 1963, the CEGB was researching the possibility of using warmed cooling water from power stations to support fish-farming both for recreational use and for food. They introduced carp (Cyprinus carpio), grass carp, silver carp and Tilapia into the cooling water ponds at Grove Road power station. The fish grew quickly in the warm water (up to 27 °C).
