= Charing Cross and Strand Electricity Supply Corporation =

British electricity undertaking

Charing Cross and Strand Electricity Supply Corporation Limited
- Formerly: Electricity Supply Corporation (1889)
- Company type: Public limited company
- Industry: Energy: electricity generation and supply
- Founded: 12 June 1889
- Founder: Sir John and Stefano Gatti
- Defunct: 31 March 1948
- Fate: Nationalisation
- Successor: Charing Cross, West End and City Electricity Supply Company (1905, renamed); London Power Company (1925–48); British Electricity Authority (1948–55); London Electricity Board (1948–90)
- Headquarters: 60 St. Martin's Lane, London
- Area served: City of London and West End
- Key people: see text
- Services: Generation, distribution and sales of electricity
- Revenue: see table in text
- Parent: London Power Company

The Charing Cross and Strand Electricity Supply Corporation Limited was a British electricity undertaking. It was incorporated as a public company in 1889 to generate and supply electricity to parts of the City of Westminster, Holborn and later the City of London. From 1925 it worked jointly with other companies as part of the London Power Company. The company was abolished on 31 March 1948 when the British electricity industry was nationalised, and its assets were transferred to the British Electricity Authority and the London Electricity Board. The Charing Cross Corporation's Bow power station continued in operation until 1969.

== History ==
The entrepreneurs Sir John Maria Emilio Gatti and his brother Rocco Joseph Stefano Gatti owned the Royal Adelphi theatre and the Adelaide restaurant in the Strand in the West End. From September 1883 they provided electric lighting for the restaurant from a small generating plant in the basement of the building. The plant comprised two multi-tubular Field boilers providing steam to two Armington and Sims engines each driving two 150-lamp Edison bipolar dynamos. The system was capable of operating 330 lamps. By 1886 the plant was supplying lighting at the Adelphi theatre. With growing electricity demand a new generating station was built in 1888 at Bull Inn Court, between Maiden Lane and The Strand. The station had three Babcock and Wilcox boilers providing steam at 140 psi (9.6 bar) to four compound Willans engines coupled to two 84 kW and two 50 kW Edison-Hopkinson dynamos. These machines generated direct current at 105 V.

=== Public electricity supplies ===
Charing Cross Electricity Supply Corporation (Further Powers) Act 1900
- Act of Parliament
- Parliament of the United Kingdom
- Long title: An Act to empower the Charing Cross and Strand Electricity Supply Corporation Limited to construct a generating station in the Parish of West Ham and to lay mains connecting their generating stations and to acquire lands and to construct a short line of railway and for other purposes.
- Citation: 63 & 64 Vict. c. ccxxvii

Dates
- Royal assent: 6 August 1900

To extend supplies more widely in the area the Electric Supply Corporation was registered as an electricity undertaking on 12 June 1889 with statutory authority to supply electricity to parts of Holborn and Westminster. These areas were: the southern part of Holborn Metropolitan Borough except Lincoln's Inn and Staple Inn; the Strand district and the parish of St. Martin in the Fields in the City of Westminster. The Metropolitan Electric Supply Company Limited objected to the new undertaking as it already supplied the Strand district with electricity. The Charing Cross Company argued that it would provide low-tension current that would be an advantage for motive power over the high-tension supply from the Metropolitan Electric Supply Company. The Gatti brothers were directors and shareholders of the new company. The Electric Supply Corporation took over the ownership and operation of the Maiden Lane station, and soon after changed the company name to the Charing Cross and Strand Electricity Supply Corporation Limited. Further increases in demand were met by several extensions to the Maiden Lane station from 1892.

To supplement electricity supplies the Charing Cross Company built a new power station in 1896 at 85 Commercial Road, Lambeth on the south of the River Thames. Electricity was transferred across the river through ducts in Hungerford and Waterloo Bridges. The plant at Commercial Road had a capacity of 3,600 kW and operated at 1,000 V. The voltage was reduced to 200 V for distribution to customers by motor–generator sets located in local substations on the north side of the river. These substations were located at Maiden Lane; Shorts Gardens, Drury Lane; and St. Martins Lane.

In 1897 the plant had a generating capacity of 2,575 kW and the maximum load was 1,377 kW. A total of 2615.51 MWh of electricity was sold to 719 customers which powered 107,542 lamps, this provided an income to the company of £48,026-16-6d. The growth of the undertaking is demonstrated in the table.

Growth of the Charing Cross undertaking
Year	No. of 8 candle power lamps	Gross revenue	Net revenue	Units Supplied (m)
1892	29,000	£20,658 13 8	£9,997 13 3	
1893	34,570	£22,303 19 2	£8,654 8 4	
1894	41,216	£26,532 0 5	£10,395 12 9	
1895	51,302	£28,571 0 1	£12,587 3 11	
1896	73,464	£38,804 13 4	£15,288 15 1	
1897	107,542	£48,880 17 9	£18,907 2 11	
1898		£59,000		3.241
1899	182,689	£69,700		3.862

Electric Lighting Order Confirmation (No. 20) Act 1899
- Act of Parliament
- Parliament of the United Kingdom
- Long title: An Act to confirm a Provisional Order made by the Board of Trade under the Electric Lighting Acts 1882 and 1888 relating to the City of London.
- Citation: 62 & 63 Vict. c. cclxxv

Dates
- Royal assent: 9 August 1899

Other legislation
- Relates to: Electric Lighting Act 1882; Electric Lighting Act 1888

Text of statute as originally enacted

City of London Electric Lighting Act 1900
- Act of Parliament
- Parliament of the United Kingdom
- Long title: An Act to empower the City of London Electric Lighting Company Limited to acquire lands and work generating stations and for other purposes.
- Citation: 63 & 64 Vict. c. lxxxviii

Dates
- Royal assent: 10 July 1900

In 1899 the company sought and received authority under the Electric Lighting Order Confirmation (No. 20) Act 1899 (62 & 63 Vict. c. cclxxv) to supply electricity to the City of London. This supply was in competition with City of London Electric Lighting Company. One of the conditions of the act was that the company would provide, within two years, a power station to supply the city with electricity. Such an arrangement would allow the City Corporation to purchase a complete electricity supply system. Accordingly, a new station was constructed at Bow in the Borough of West Ham, about 4 miles north east of Charing Cross. A separate operating undertaking within the Charing Cross Company was established to manage this supply.

In 1900 Lambeth installed power had increased to 6,000 kW and was being further expanded to 9,000 kW. The station was closed in 1911 when the lease expired on the site.

=== Bow power station ===
Bow power station (51°32′03″N 0°00′43″W) was built on a 7½ acre (3.04 ha) site in Marshgate Road, Bow, and was first commissioned in 1902. It generated 3-phase alternating current at 10 kV and 50 Hz. It was the first 3-phase plant in the UK. Initially the equipment comprised two 800 kW and two 1600 kW Lahmeyer generating sets. The 800 kW sets were driven by Bellis and Morcom high speed engines, and the 1600 kW sets by Sulzer Bros. engines. The boilers were manufactured by Richard Hornsby. A further two 1600 kW Lahmeyer generating sets were added shortly after opening. Steam was supplied from ten 24,000 lb/hr horizontal boilers along with two 12,000 lb/hr boilers. Unusually all but one of these boilers were hand fired.

In 1904–05 a pair of 4 MW generators were added, these were then the largest generating machines in the country. They were driven by Sulzer three cylinder compound engines. Steam was from a pair of Hornsby vertical boilers with an output capacity of 140,000 lb/h (17.6 kg/s) at 160 psi (11.0 bar) for each 4 MW set. Steam from the engines discharged into jet-condensers and cooling was by 16 fan driven circular steel cooling towers, 30 ft (11 m) in diameter and 85 ft (26 m) high. Coal was delivered to the power station by the River Lea and its channels.

The station transmitted electricity at 10 kV through underground cables through the districts of Poplar, Mile End and Whitechapel to four substations in the City (Fenchurch Street, Upper Thames Street, Ludgate Hill and Beech Street) Each contained motor generator sets fed directly at 10 kV to convert power to Direct Current for local distribution at 200 or 400 Volts. with a total of 8.4 MW motor-generator sets to provide Direct Current for local distribution. This was supplemented by a 1,600 kW of batteries. There were also four substations in the West End (Maiden Lane, Shorts Gardens, St.Martins Lane and Green Park) which could be supplied from Bow or the Lambeth station to supply Direct Current to the local areas.

Following the First World War the reciprocating engines at Bow were gradually replaced with more efficient steam turbines. New Babcock and Wilcox boilers supplied steam at 270 psi (18.6 bar) and 650 °F (343 °C).

=== Operations ===
The company changed its name in February 1905 to the Charing Cross, West End and City Electricity Supply Company Limited to reflect its enlarged supply area in the city.

As new generating plant was commissioned so older and less efficient plant was retired: the advent of Bow power station led to the eventual closure of the Lambeth station by 1909.

It was reported in 1910 that the City of Westminster had transferred electric street lighting, comprising 66 arc lamps run by the St. James Electric Light Company, to a gas company for conversion back to gas lighting. The usual pattern at this period was the substitution of electricity in place of gas for street lighting. The Charing Cross Company confirmed they continued to operate 165 arc lamps in the City of Westminster.

A summary of operating data for the Charing Cross Company from 1903 to 1936 is as follows:

Charing Cross Electricity Company summary of operating data, 1903–36
Year	Undertaking	Generating capacity, MW	Maximum load, MW	No. of Customers	Electricity generated, GWh	Electricity sold, GWh
1903	West End	4.4	4.28	?	10.32	7.19
1903	City	8.0	5.71	?	5.80	3.56
1905	West End		5.25		10.63	9.75
1905	City		8.98		12.74	9.75
1906	West End		5.35		9.92	
	City		10.57		14.59	
1912–13	West End	3.76	6.33	3464	39.00	12.23
1912–13	City	19.72	7.38	4466	39.00	15.43
1919	West End	2.6	7.19	?	41.90	12.65
1919	City	20.9	9.4	?	41.90	17.54
1923–24	West End	2.60	10.92	4602	2.70 + 21.41 purchased	18.98
1923–24	City	30.5	24.93	5696	52.13	45.02
1931	West End	?	?	?	3.72 + 46.57 purchased	39.27
1931	City	?	?	?	0 + 52.24 purchased	43.50
1936	West End	6.4	48.99	5394	55.08 + 133.8 purchased	54.35
1936	City	6.4	48.99	6220	55.08 + 133.8 purchased	62.11

From the early 1920s interconnections between electricity undertakings enabled bulk supplies of electricity to be sold and purchased. For example, in 1923 the West End undertaking, in addition to its 2.6 MW generating capacity, had 10.7 MW of transformer capability enabling electricity to be imported.

In 1923 the generating plant comprised the following. At Bow there were 2 × 3.0 MW, 2 × 5.0 MW and 1 × 2.5 MW turbo generators, plus 2 × 4.0 MW reciprocating generators giving a total capacity of 36.52 MW. The maximum load on the system was 23,164 MW. These machines were supplied by boilers with a total steam output capacity of 575,000 lb/hr (72.45 kg/s). At St. Martins Lane there were 2 × 450 kV oil driven generators providing a DC supply, and at Shorts Gardens there were 4 × 450 kW and 2 × 530 kW oil driven generators also providing a DC supply.

By 1925 the station had been substantially rebuilt with 2 x 6,000 kW (1 English Electric 1 Parsons) and 2 x 12,500 kW Fraser & Chalmer English Electric turbo alternators.

In 1928 the company installed new substations in Soho Square (1500 kW) and Aldwych (3000 kW), and a new 1200 kW diesel engine at Shorts Gardens. The substation at Shorts Gardens was housed in a 3-storey red brick building (extant 2020) numbered 62–72 Shorts Gardens at the northeast end of Shorts Gardens near Drury Lane.

It was noted in 1931 that major rebuilding work in the City and the West End particularly the construction of substantially larger buildings provided with ‘lavish’ lighting had increased the demand for electricity from the company.

In 1935 the Charing Cross Company distributed electricity from 14 substations, these were located at: 12 Maiden Lane, Short's Gardens, St. Martins Lane, Chancery Lane, Soho Square, Aldwych, Trafalgar Buildings, 85 Fenchurch Street, 86 Upper Thames Street, 68/70 Ludgate Hill, Seacoal Lane, 9 Beech Street, Broad Street, and Smithfield Market. By 1936–7 the substation in St. Martin's Lane was equipped with three generator sets of 575 kW, 750 kW and 1200 kW, in that year they generated 2.38 MWh of power. The substation was severely damaged during the war.

=== Financial ===
In 1903 the Charing Cross Company charged 3.78 d./kWh for a private electricity supply and 1.77 d./kWh for public lighting. These were both less than that charged by the City of London Company: 3.87 and 1.98 d./kWh respectively.

By 1912–3 a more complex charging system was used. For the West End area the company charged 2.02 d./kWh for street lighting and 3.18 d./kWh for ‘other’ public lighting, it charged 3.15 d./kWh for private lighting, 1.22 d./kWh for power and heat to the Borough Council and 1.51 d./kWh for power and heat to private customers. For the City area the charges were 2.37 d./kWh other public lighting, 3.14 d./kWh for private lighting, 0.93 d./kWh for power and heat to the borough council, and 1.51 d./kWh for power and heat to private customers.

For 1918 the charging system was less complex, for the West End the company charged 3.47 d./kWh for public lighting, 6.26 d./kWh for private light, 2.45 d./kWh for power and heat; for the City undertaking the charges were 6.64 d./kWh for private lighting and 2.31 d./kWh for power and heat.

The financial revenue, expenditure and surplus over the period 1912–36 was as follows:

Charing Cross Electricity Company financial summary, 1912–36
Year	Undertaking	Revenue	Expenditure	Gross surplus
1912–13	West End	£146,265	£57,564	£79,801
1912–13	City	£148,513	£72,697	£66,673
1919	West End	£262,950	£152,911	£96,789
1919	City	£330,981	£258,250	£60,327
1921	West End	£312,500	£212,116	
1921	City	£438,772		
1922	West End	£333,000	£187,000	
1922	City	£437,002		
1936	West End	£410,674	£296,735	£190,740
1936	City	£388,618	£265,286	£184,449

The increase in expenditure between 1913 and 1919 is partly due to the rise in commodity prices during this period. The company noted that the bill for coal in 1914 was less than £40,000 but by 1918 it was £108,000 and in 1919 was £157,000.

Dividends to shareholders were paid throughout the operational life of the company. Dividends as a percentage of the total capital raised in a given year were as shown, together with the average dividends paid by the London company electricity undertakings.

Charing Cross company shareholder dividends, 1892–1919
Year	1892	1893	1894	1895	1896	1897	1898	1899	1900	1901	1902	1903	1904	1905
West End dividend %	4.75	4.62	4.66	5.01	5.47	6.19	6.25	7.43	6.95	6.66	5.78	5.66	5.37	4.52
City dividend %	–	–	–	–	–	–	–	–	–	3.65	3.80	3.17	3.26	3.30
London average dividend %	2.10	2.68	3.40	4.01	4.66	5.54	5.10	5.15	4.60	5.29	5.55	5.51	5.79	5.65
Year	1906	1907	1908	1909	1910	1911	1912	1913	1914	1915	1916	1917	1918	1919
West End dividend %	4.50	4.48	4.48	4.48	4.48	4.48	4.48	4.80	4.48	4.48	4.48	4.16	4.16	5.12
City dividend %	3.46	3.38	3.66	3.27	3.34	3.37	3.37	3.37	3.37	3.37	3.37	3.37	3.37	3.37
London average dividend %	5.40	5.14	5.12	5.07	5.07	5.11	5.18	5.33	5.10	4.87	4.68	5.32	4.96	5.76

=== Amalgamation and joint working ===
In 1920 the company was one of nine electricity undertakings which formed the London Electricity Joint Committee to oppose schemes proposed by the Electricity Commissioners for reorganisation of electricity supplies in London. The Joint Committee acquired Bow generating station and the transmission system. In 1924 the company changed its name to the Charing Cross Electricity Supply Company Limited and was an authorised distribution supplying an electricity supply in bulk to Smithfield Markets Electric Supply Company.

In 1925 the Charing Cross Company and other undertakings formed, under the provisions of the London Electricity (No. 2) Act 1925 (15 & 16 Geo. 5. c. lxiii), the London Power Company. The LPC amalgamated the ownership and management of the generating stations, but left the supply of electricity to customers with the constituent companies.

From 1 January 1937 the Charing Cross Company acquired five other undertakings to coordinate the distribution of electricity in their areas of London. The other undertakings were: Brompton and Kensington Electricity Supply Company Limited; Chelsea Electricity Supply Company Limited; Kensington and Knightsbridge Electric Lighting Company Limited; St. James and Pall Mall Electric Light Company Limited; and Westminster Electric Supply Corporation Limited. The Charing Cross Company changed its name again, this time to Central London Electricity Limited. All the shares of Central London Electricity were held by a non-statutory company known as London Associated Electricity Undertakings Limited. The company's supply area now included Chelsea, City of London, Holborn (south), Kensington (south), Westminster (east). However, the company failed to attract a wider range of London companies to the merger and therefore planning of London's electricity remained un-integrated.

Upon nationalisation of the electricity industry in 1948 the Central London Electricity Limited undertaking was abolished and its generation and main transmission assets, including Bow power station, was transferred to the British Electricity Authority (1948–55), then to the Central Electricity Authority (1955–57), and finally to the Central Electricity Generating Board (1958–69). The electricity distribution and sales to customer assets of the Central London Electricity Limited were vested in the London Electricity Board.

=== Post-nationalisation ===
In 1954 the working capacity of the generators at Bow power station was 51.5 MW. The steam capacity of the chain gate stoked boilers was 785,000 lb/hr (98.9 kg/s) and the steam conditions at the turbine stop-valves was 250 psi (17.2 bar) and 343 °C. In 1954 the station burned 23,600 tons of coal. In 1954 the overall thermal efficiency of the station was 13.6 per cent, this had fallen to 9.84 percent in the final year of operation.

Electricity output of the station, in GWh, over the period 1946–68

Bow power station ceased generating electricity in 1969 and was subsequently demolished.

The Shorts Gardens substation continued to generate electricity until the early 1960s, using internal combustion engines. There was one 550 kW and two 1,125 kW oil engines. It was used as a peak shaving plant: in 1954 it had a capacity 2.8 MW, was run for 604 hours and delivered 287 MWh. In 1961 the station had a capacity of 2.8 MW, it was run for 170 hours and delivered 62 MWh. In 1961/2 it generated 118 MWh, and in 1962/3 it delivered 252 MWh. The building is used (in 2020) by UK Power Networks.

== Key people ==
The Directors of the Charing Cross Company in 1903 were:

- Sir William Francis Fladgate (1853–1937) (chairman)
- G.H. Brougham Glasier (Vice-chairman)
- Sir John M. Gatti (1872–1929) (managing director until at least 1928)
- Stefano Gatti
- Richard Chadwick

The Company Secretary was Edward Wilmot Seale, later Cecil G. Stanesby

The Engineer-in-Chief was W.H. Patchell.

The company office was at 60 St. Martin's Lane, London, WC.

The Gatti family, and their role in electricity supply, are commemorated on a Green Plaque in the Strand.

== Company names ==
In summary the various names of the company were:

- Electric Supply Corporation (12 June 1889 – 1889)
- Charing Cross and Strand Electricity Supply Corporation Limited (1889–1905)
- Charing Cross, West End and City Electricity Supply Company Limited (February 1905 – 1924)
- Charing Cross Electricity Supply Company Limited (1924–1937)
- Central London Electricity Limited (1937–1948)

== See also ==
- List of pre-nationalisation UK electric power companies
- Timeline of the UK electricity supply industry
- County of London Electric Supply Company
- London Power Company
- London Electricity Board
- National Grid
