= London Power Company =

British electricity generating and supply company

- Type: Public limited company
- Industry: Energy: electricity generation and transmission
- Predecessor: London Electricity Joint Committee (1920) Limited
- Defunct: 31 March 1948
- Fate: Abolished by nationalisation
- Successor: British Electricity Authority
- Headquarters: Ergon House, Horseferry Road, Westminster, SW., London, United Kingdom
- Area served: County of London
- Key people: see text
- Production output: 1,500 GWh (1934)
- Services: Electricity generation and transmission
- Revenue: £2,527,736 (1936)

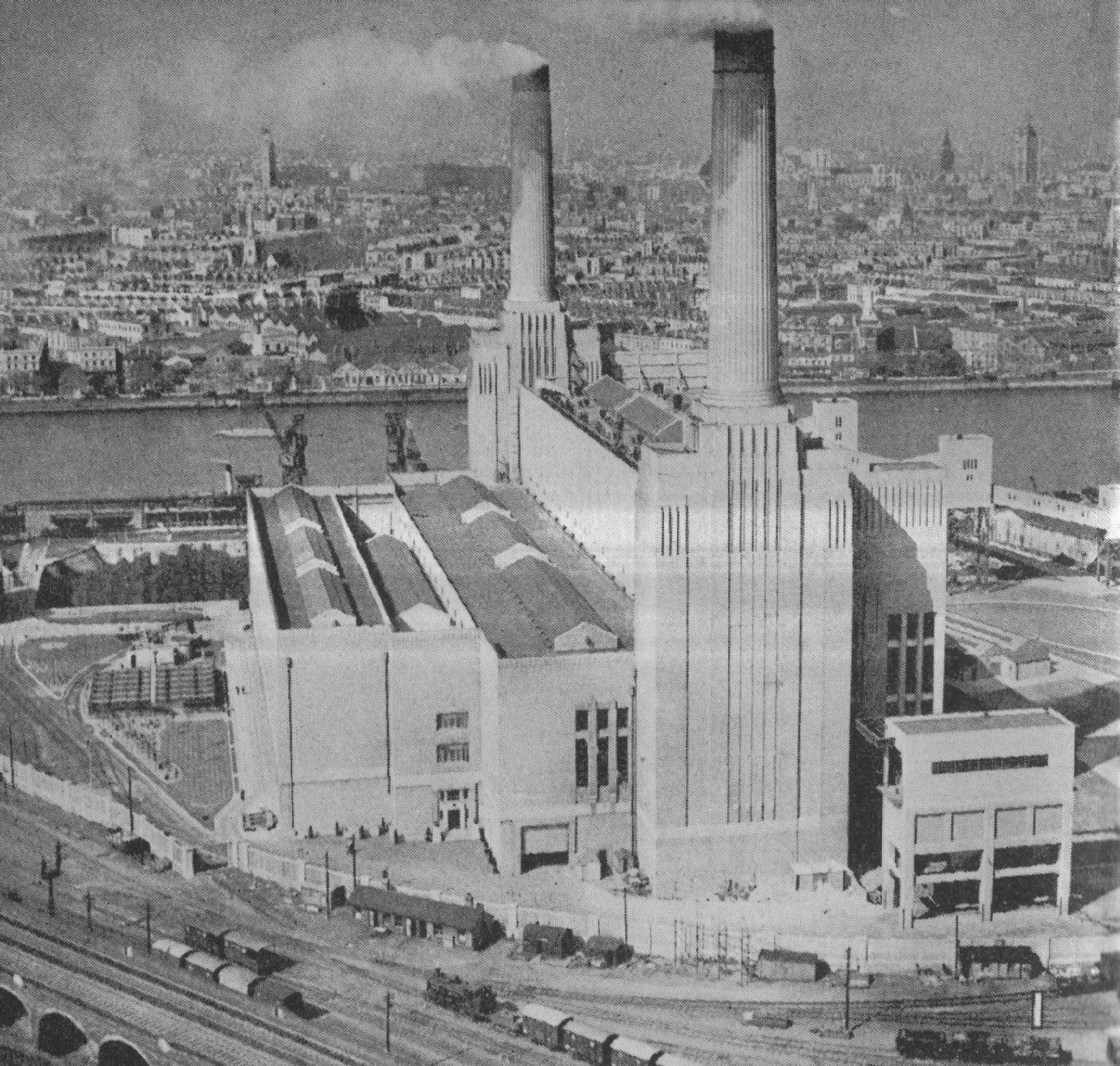
Battersea A Power Station, completed in 1934

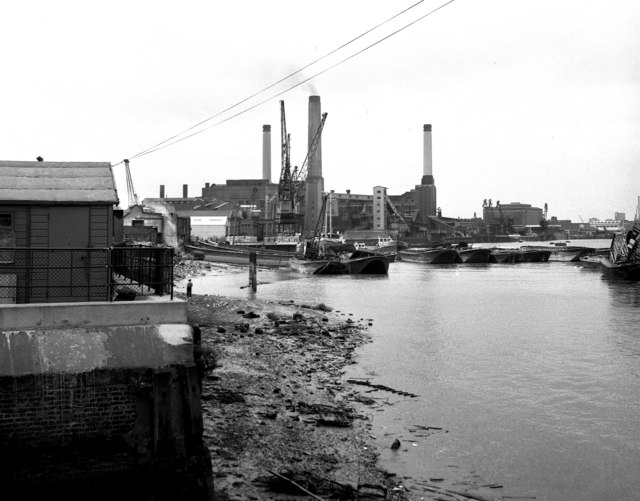
Deptford West Power Station in 1973

The London Power Company was an electricity generating and bulk supply company in London, England, formed in 1925 by the merger of ten small electricity companies. In 1948 Britain's electricity supply industry was nationalised under the Electricity Act 1947 and the company was absorbed into the British Electricity Authority.

== Legislation ==
The London Power Company originated in the London Electricity Joint Committee (1920) Limited, established in January 1920, which aimed to secure cooperation between London's electricity companies. The company promoted the London Electricity (No. 2) Act 1925 (14 & 15 Geo. 5. c. lxiii) which empowered electricity companies to amalgamate. It also regulated their dividends, required funds to be set up to transfer the companies' assets to the London and Home Counties Joint Electricity Authority, required companies to notify the authority of any proposal to spend capital exceeding £5,000, to dispose of any electricity generated in excess of that obligated to customers, and to carry out the technical integration scheme for the district.

=== Constituent companies ===
The constituent electricity undertakings of the London Power Company were:

- Brompton and Kensington Electricity Supply Company Limited
- Central Electric Supply Company Limited
- Charing Cross Electricity Supply Company Limited
- Chelsea Electricity Supply Company Limited
- Kensington and Knightsbridge Electric Lighting Company Limited
- London Electric Supply Corporation Limited
- Metropolitan Electric Supply Company Limited
- Notting Hill Electric Lighting Company Limited
- St James' and Pall Mall Electric Light Company Limited
- Westminster Electric Supply Corporation Limited

== Power stations ==
=== Local power stations ===
The London Power Company's ten constituent companies had many local, generally small-scale, power stations. The table demonstrates the range of power station sizes, supply voltages and electrical current systems of the constituent companies in 1919 prior to the formation of the London Power Company.

London Power Company, constituent company operations, 1919
Company	Power station	Generating capacity, MW	Electricity supply to customers
Brompton and Kensington Electricity Supply Company	Richmond Road	4.50	100 V AC
Charing Cross Electricity Supply Corporation	Bow	20.90	200 & 400 V DC
Charing Cross Electricity Supply Corporation	Shorts Gardens, St. Martins Lane etc.	2.60	100, 200 & 400 V DC
Chelsea Electricity Supply Company	Alpha Place Flood Street	3.40	200 & 400 V DC
Kensington and Knightsbridge Electricity Co.	Kensington Court, Cheval Place	1.46	200 V DC
Kensington and Notting Hill joint	Wood Lane	9.00	
London Electric Supply Corporation	Deptford	38.00	100 & 200 V AC; 230 & 460 V DC
Metropolitan Electric Supply Company	Acton Lane (Willesden), Amberley Road	25.90	100 & 200 V AC, 60 Hz. 100 & 200 V DC; 240 & 415 V AC; 230 & 460 V DC
Notting Hill Electric Lighting Company	Bulmer Place	0.480	200 V DC
St James' and Pall Mall Electric Lighting Company	Carnaby Street, Masons Yard	3.22	110 & 220 V DC
Westminster Electric Supply Corporation	Horseferry Road, Eccleston Place, Davies Street	9.82	200 & 400 V DC
Central Electric Supply Company (joint St. James and Westminster)	Grove Road	20.22	(Bulk supply)

The constituent companies had generated in total 190.657 GWh (in 1923), 215.953 GWh (1924) and 263.113 GWh (1925).

=== LPC power stations ===
The London Power Company closed the least efficient power stations of its constituent companies and purchased or leased the rest, then built new stations. Electricity was sold to the constituent companies for distribution and sale.

Construction of Deptford West Power Station for the London Power Company started in 1925 and was completed in 1929. It had two 30 MW, three 35 MW and one 50 MW generating sets, a total installed capacity of 222 MW. It provided electricity to Central and East London.

Construction of Battersea A Power Station was started in 1929 and completed in 1934; supplying electricity to Central and West London, it had an installed capacity of 251.7 MW. The Second World War delayed the start of construction of Battersea B Power Station until 1945 and it was not completed until 1955, seven years after nationalisation. Battersea B had a final installed capacity of 260 MW.

The LPC's principal power stations were Deptford West, Battersea and Willesden. In addition electricity was available from Bow, Grove Road and Deptford East.

==== Former power stations ====
The following power stations were closed by the LPC on the dates shown:

- Alpha Place 1928
- Amberley Road 1926
- Horseferry Road (1927) opened in 1910 to replace the Milllbank station it contained four 20,000 lb/hr Babcock & Wilcox boilers feeding steam to 3 x Howden turbines each driving a 2 x 500 kW Siemens Bros dynamos.
- Richmond Road 1928
- Wood Lane (1928) Opened in 1900 when it had five Babcock & Wilcox boilers feeding steam to 3 x 575 HP Willans engines coupled to 330 kW alternators plus two 825 HP engines coupled to 550 kW alternators. Soon after that date two 750 kW steam engine dynamo sets then in 1904 a 1,000 kW Parsons turbo-generator was added.

== Operations ==
During 1931 the company spent £2 million on Battersea power station and interconnecting mains, including 66kV transmission mains between Deptford and Battersea and between Battersea and Willesden. The London Power Company generated 941.77 GWh of AC electricity. It also supplied direct current from Bow power station (built by the London Electric Supply Co.) which generated 3.72 GWh of DC power that year. The total cost of operations had fallen from 0.5888 d./kWh in 1930 to 0.5608 d./kWh in 1931.

The Central Electric Supply Company was legally dissolved in October 1932, as its functions to supply electricity in bulk to the St. James and Westminster companies had been subsumed by the London Power Company.

In 1934 the capital expenditure was £646,000. The combined output from Battersea, Deptford West and Willesden was 1,225 GWh, and Bow, Grove Road and Deptford East brought the total to 1,500 GWh, which was about 10 per cent of the whole output of the country. The LPC provided supplies at short notice to the Central Electricity Board (CEB); these ranged from 8 MW to 25 MW and the total supplied to the CEB was 400 GWh. The total cost of generation in 1934 was 0.5195 d./kWh.

In 1936 the total generating capacity of the London Power Company was 837.9 MW AC. In that year the company generated 2,273.8 GWh of electricity, which provided a revenue of £2,527,736. Generation was now under the direction of the Central Electricity Board and was distributed into the National Grid. In addition to Deptford and Battersea, Bow power station had a generating capacity of 6.4 MW of DC power, from which it generated 5.078 GWh in 1936.

In January 1937 the Charing Cross Company acquired five other undertakings to further coordinate the distribution of electricity in their areas of London. These were: Brompton and Kensington; Chelsea; Kensington and Knightsbridge; St. James and Pall Mall; and Westminster Corporation. The Charing Cross Company changed its name to Central London Electricity Limited.

In 1947 the LPC's capital expenditure was £906,438. This included plans for additional plant at Deptford East HP although this work was only completed in 1953. Additional 66kV interconnections between Battersea and the substation at Horseferry Road were commissioned. The total electricity output in 1947 was 3,164 GWh, with 1,176 GWh supplied to the CEB.

=== Key people ===
The board of directors of the LPC constituted a director from each of the companies. The board in 1926 comprised:

- William Francis Fladgate (chairman)
- Henry Ramie Beeton (d.1934)
- Robert Henry Benson
- William Reginald Davies
- Arthur Alice Franklin
- Walter Leaf
- Andrew Wilson Tait
- Frederick James Walker
- Lord Wargrave
- Colin Campbell Wyllie

The General Manager and Secretary was William A. Pearman.

The engineers were Sir Alexander Kennedy and Gerald W. Partridge. Sir Leonard Pearce was engineer-in-chief of the LPC from 1926, and designed Deptford B and Battersea power stations.

Later directors included: Lord Bessborough (1932), Oliver Bury (1932), C.B.B. Smith-Bingham (1935), Stanley Beeton (1935), H. Richardson (Chairman 1948), Earl of Lytton (chairman, d. 1947), C. Parker (Deputy Chairman 1948), John C. Dalton (1948).

Francis Fladgate, Sir Alexander Kennedy, Sir Leonard Pearce and William Pearman had colliers named after them.

=== Nationalisation ===
Metropolitan Electric Supply Company (METESCo) manhole cover

Upon nationalisation of the electricity supply industry under the Electricity Act 1947, the generation and transmission functions of the London Power Company were vested in the British Electricity Authority from 1 April 1948. The distribution and electricity sales functions of the constituent companies were vested in the London Electricity Board on the same day.

== Colliers ==
The LPC had its own fleet of coastal colliers to deliver coal to its power stations. Several were flatiron ships, built with low-profile superstructures and fold-down funnel and masts to pass under bridges upriver from Tower Bridge on the River Thames to reach Battersea. Those ships that were built for the LPC were each named after a person, several of whom were prominent in the history of electrical engineering.

The company's ships had brown upper works above hull level. The funnel was red, emblazoned with the initials "LPC" in white, and had a black top. The house flag was red with the initials "L.P.C." in white capitals.

=== Fleet ===
SS Alexander Kennedy (I) was a 1,315 GRT flatiron launched in June 1932 by the Burntisland Shipbuilding Company of Fife, Scotland. She was named after the electrical engineer Sir Alexander Kennedy (1847–1928), who held a consultancy contract with the LPC. On 22 February 1945 she was in convoy BTC-76 en route from Barry in South Wales to London when the Type VIIC/41 U-boat U-1004 torpedoed and sank her southeast of Falmouth. 1 crew member was killed but 18 survived.

SS Tyndall was a 1,314 GRT flatiron launched in July 1932 by S.P. Austin & Co. of Sunderland. She passed to the British Electricity Authority in 1949, Central Electricity Authority in 1954 and CEGB in 1957. In 1958 she was broken up at Delfzijl in the Netherlands.

SS John Hopkinson was a 1,314 GRT flatiron and Tyndall's sister ship, launched in October 1932 by S.P. Austin & Co. She was named after the physicist and electrical engineer John Hopkinson FRS (1849–98), who invented the three-phase system of distributing electricity.

SS Ferranti was a 1,315 GRT flatiron and Alexander Kennedy's sister ship, launched in October 1932 at Burntisland. She was named after Sebastian de Ferranti (1864–1930), who designed Deptford East Power Station in 1887 for the London Electricity Supply Corporation. On 8 June 1955 she was involved in a collision with the 7,602 GRT Victory Ship SS American Jurist off Greenhithe in the North Sea. She was beached to prevent her sinking, and was broken up at Grays, Essex in March 1956.

SS Colonel Crompton was a 1,495 GRT collier launched in July 1933 by S.P. Austin & Co. She was named after the electrical engineer R. E. B. Crompton (1845–1940), who was a pioneer of electric lighting.

SS Francis Fladgate was a 2,268 GRT collier launched at Burntisland in September 1933. She was larger than Alexander Kennedy and Ferranti and not a flatiron, so she could not serve Battersea but could carry larger loads to Deptford. In October 1942 Francis Fladgate was a member of an FN-series coastal convoy that had assembled in the North Sea off Southend to sail for Grangemouth. At about 0155 hrs on 8 October, 5.2 miles (8.4 km) off Cromer in the North Sea she struck SS Varøy, a Norwegian coaster in the same convoy. Varøy was holed and sank but her crew of at least 23 men were all rescued. In 1958 Francis Fladgate was sold to new owners in Piraeus, Greece who renamed her Anthippi Michalos. In 1962 she was sold again to owners in Genoa, Italy who renamed her Brick Sesto. In May 1971 she was broken up at Vado Ligure, Italy.

SS Charles Parsons was a 1,569 GRT collier launched by S.P. Austin & Co. in July 1936. She was named after the engineer Sir Charles Parsons (1854–1931), whose invention of the steam turbine and improvement of dynamo design greatly improved electricity generation.

SS George Balfour was a 1,568 GRT collier and Charles Parsons' sister ship, launched by S.P. Austin & Co. in April 1937. She was named after the mechanical and electrical engineer George Balfour (1872–1941), who co-founded Balfour Beatty.

SS Leonard Pearce (I) was a 1,571 GRT collier launched by S.P. Austin & Co. in June 1938. She was named after Sir (Standen) Leonard Pearce (1873–1947), who was engineer-in-chief of the LPC from 1926 and designed both Deptford B and Battersea power stations. On 11 January 1940 in the Bristol Channel she crossed the path of MV Queen Adelaide and failed to give way. Queen Adelaide struck Leonard Pearce and sank her about nine miles off Bull Point.

SS Sir Joseph Swan (I) was a 1,571 GRT collier and Leonard Pearce's sister ship, launched by S.P. Austin & Co. in July 1938. She was named after the physicist Sir Joseph Swan (1828–1914), who invented the incandescent light bulb. On 4 September 1940 a German E-boat attacked and sank her in the North Sea off Hemsby, killing 18 of her crew.

SS New Lambton was a 2,709 GRT collier that the LPC bought in 1940. S.P. Austin & Co had built her in 1924 for W.B. Nisbet and the Tanfield Steamship Company of Newcastle-upon-Tyne, who named her after the village of New Lambton, County Durham. She was a larger coaster, not a flatiron, so she could not reach Battersea but could take larger loads to Deptford. New Lambton was torpedoed and sunk on the same day and in the same part of the North Sea as Sir Joseph Swan (see above).

SS Ambrose Fleming was a 1,222 GRT flatiron launched at Burntisland in February 1941 and completed in April. She was named after the electrical engineer Sir John Ambrose Fleming (1849–1945), who invented the thermionic valve. Ambrose Fleming had a very short life, for on 28 April 1941 a German E-boat torpedoed and sank her off Cromer. 11 crew members were lost and 11 were rescued.

SS Sir Leonard Pearce (II) was a 1,580 GRT flatiron launched at Burntisland in August 1941. She took the name of the previous Leonard Pearce lost in 1940. She was broken up in Sunderland in June 1960.

SS William Pearman was a 1,552 GRT flatiron launched at Burntisland in February 1942. She was broken up in Sunderland in June 1960.

SS Sir Joseph Swan (II) was a 1,554 GRT flatiron launched at Burntisland in September 1945. She took the name of the earlier Sir Joseph Swan sunk in 1940. She was broken up in May 1961 at Zelzate, Belgium.

SS Oliver Bury was a 2,904 GRT collier launched at Burntisland in November 1945. She was a larger coaster, not a flatiron, so she could not reach Battersea but could take larger loads to Deptford. In 1970 she was sold to new owners in Nicosia, Cyprus who renamed her Alycia. She was broken up in March 1973 in La Spezia, Italy.

SS Sir Alexander Kennedy (II) was a 1,714 GRT collier launched by S.P. Austin & Co. in April 1946. She took the name of the earlier Sir Alexander Kennedy torpedoed in 1945.

== Sources ==
- Harnack, Edward P (1938) [1903]. All About Ships & Shipping (7th ed.). London: Faber and Faber. pp. 612–613.
- Talbot-Booth, E.C. (1942) [1936]. Ships and the Sea (Seventh ed.). London: Sampson Low, Marston & Co. Ltd. p. 778.
