= Ferranti Park =

Urban park in Deptford, London

- Location within London Borough of Lewisham
- Type: Public park
- Location: London, SE8
- Coordinates: 51°28′47″N 0°01′15″W
- Area: 0.29 hectares (0.72 acres)
- Created: c.2005
- Operator: Lewisham London Borough Council
- Status: Open year round
- Website: Ferranti Park

Ferranti Park is a small - 0.29 hectares (0.72 acres) - urban park in Deptford, southeast London, situated on the west side of Creekside, approximately 100m west of Deptford Creek in the London Borough of Lewisham. Adjacent to the Sue Godfrey Nature Park, the park was named after Sebastian Ferranti, designer of the nearby Deptford East Power Station, demolished and redeveloped in the 1990s.

Created on previously derelict land in the early 2000s, the park was designed by The Landscape Partnership, and includes a shelter, a play area, and artworks designed in collaboration with local artists and incorporated into perimeter walls. The park won the Urban Greenspace category in the Local Government News Awards 2005. The park has achieved Keep Britain Tidy Green Flag status.

Paths connect directly into Sue Godfrey Nature Park, with new footways laid from Ferranti Park towards the centre of the reserve in 2022–24 to improve access.
