= Leonard Pearce =

British electrical engineer

Sir Standen Leonard Pearce (28 September 1873 – 20 October 1947) was an English electrical engineer, perhaps best remembered for designing Battersea Power Station, on which he was assisted by Sir Giles Scott and the architectural practice Halliday and Agate. He was a key player in rationalising electricity supply in Britain and in the design of cleaner and more efficient power stations.

== Life and career ==
Pearce was born in Crewkerne, Somerset, the only child of the Rev Standen Pearce, a Baptist minister, and his wife, Sarah née Young. After education at Bishop's Stortford College and Finsbury Technical College, he was apprenticed to the Electrical Engineering Corporation, West Drayton, and later to Thomas Richardson & Sons of Hartlepool.

Pearce held appointments with the British India Steam Navigation Company and the Metropolitan Electric Supply Company, before joining the British Thomson-Houston Company in 1889. He then served as superintending engineer for Central London Railway. In 1901 he returned to electricity supply as deputy chief electrical engineer for Manchester Corporation, remaining with the same organisation for more than twenty years. On 18 July 1901 he married Susannah (Susie) Kate Cockhead (d. 1938); there was one daughter of the marriage. In 1904 Pearce was promoted to chief electrical engineer.

For the corporation, Pearce chose the site of a new power station at Barton and supervised its construction to his designs. In the early years of the twentieth century electricity supply was uncoordinated, with numerous small-scale local providers. In 1916 the Board of Trade appointed Pearce to head a committee to review the provision of electricity in Lancashire and Cheshire. Four years later, under the Electricity (Supply) Act 1919, he was instrumental in the introduction of a coordinated electricity supply scheme for south-east Lancashire electricity scheme, the first of its kind in Britain.

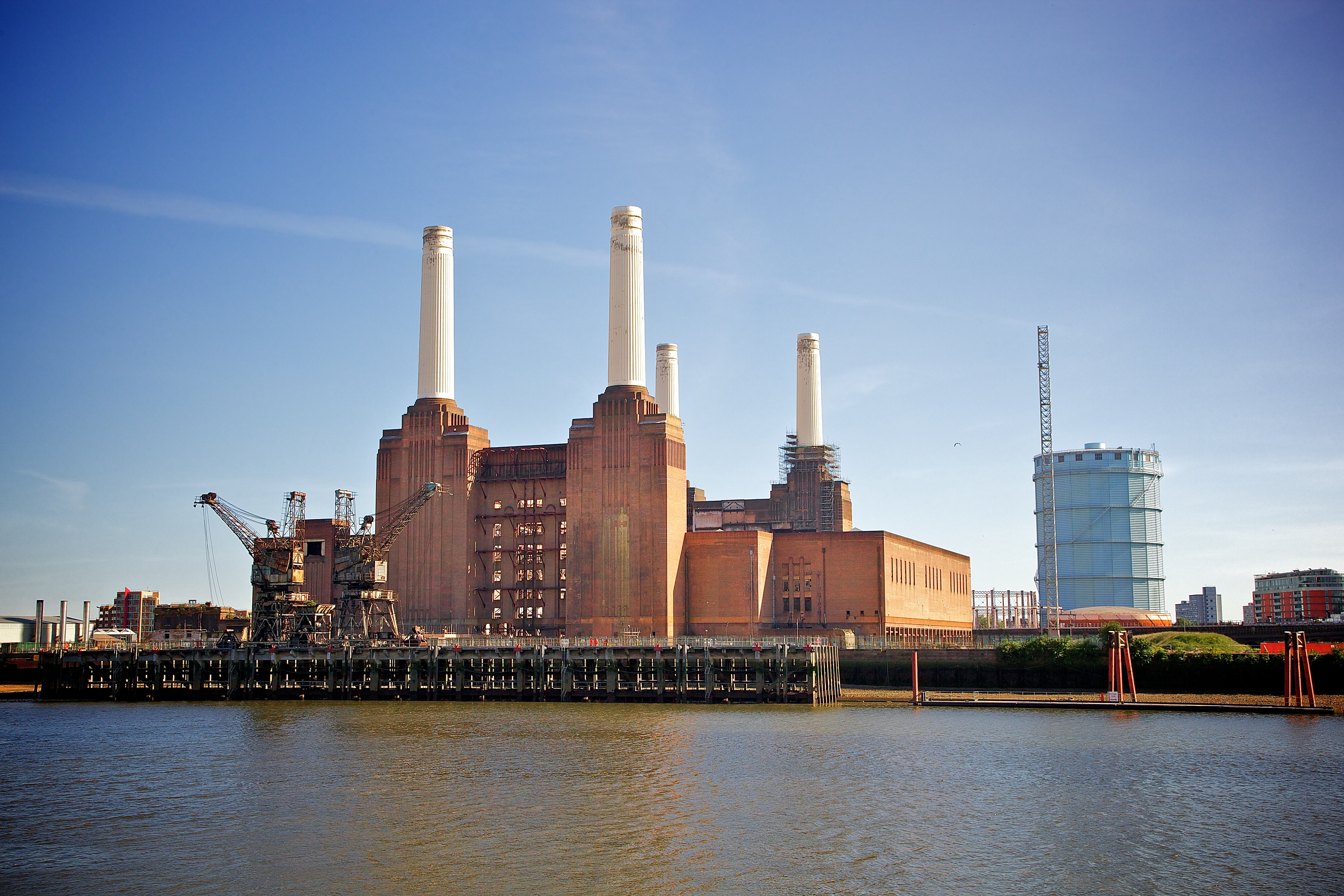
Battersea Power Station

In 1926 Pearce was appointed engineer-in-chief of the London Power Company, which had been formed to deliver to London a coordinated electricity supply on the lines he had overseen in Lancashire. The most visible products of his tenure were the Deptford and Battersea power stations. For the latter, he worked with Sir Giles Scott, who designed the exterior of the building, and the architectural practice Halliday and Agate, who created spectacular Art Deco interiors.

Pearce's biographer C E H Verity writes that Pearce's association with Scott marked the beginning of "a close collaboration between engineers and architects in the building of power stations". Because the power station was in central London Pearce was required to minimise the emissions; he devised a flue-washing plant to eliminate fumes. Battersea gained the top place among British power stations for thermal efficiency and economy of fuel consumption.

Pearce never retired. He died, still in office, aged seventy-four at his home in Bickley, Kent.

Pearce was also an accomplished alpine climber and skier having been one of the founders of the British Members of the Swiss Alpine Club in 1909. The following obituary appeared in their Journal for 1948.

SIR LEONARD PEARCE, C.B.E. 1873–1947. Sir Standen Leonard Pearce was born at Crewkerne in 1873 and died in 1947. He was educated at Bishops Stortford College and the Finsbury Technical College, and became one of the nation's leading experts in electrical supply. In 1923 he became one of the Electricity Commissioners. The great achievement of his life was in connection with the Battersea Power Station, as he was the designer of the engineering set-out of that worldfamous building. He was knighted in 1935. To us he was known as an enthusiastic and energetic mountaineer. His section was Diablerets : he was one of our original members in 1909 and, of course, • a " Veteran ". In his younger days he was a great athlete, and his special love on the mountains was long ridges. He was a skier as well as a climber, and in one great exploit he combined both these sports in his celebrated ascent, with his daughter, of the Monch in 1938, as early in the year as February, a great achievement and at the time unique. He served a period as President of the Alpine Ski Club, and he was a co-opted member of our Committee. He was offered the Presidency of the Association in 1939, but he was too modest to accept it. We shall miss his keenness and friendliness very much, for, busy as his life was, he found time to attend our meetings frequently.
