= Sue Godfrey Nature Park =

Nature reserve in Deptford, London, England

Coordinates: 51.4795°N 0.0217°W

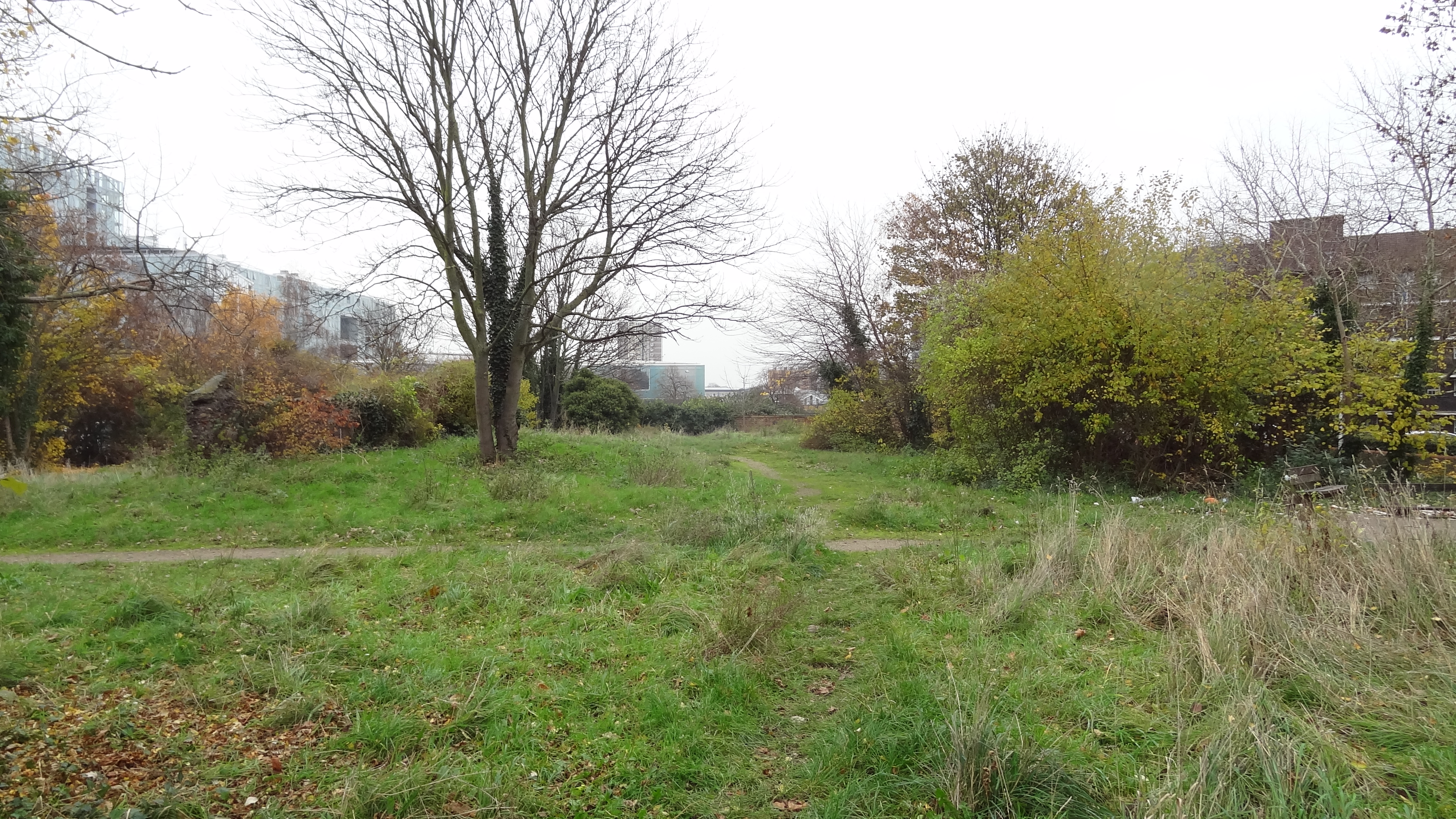

Sue Godfrey Nature Park is a small park and local nature reserve in Deptford in the London Borough of Lewisham. It is a mixture of rough grassland, scrub and ruderal plants.

The park grew up on wasteland, and was opened in 1984 as Bronze Street Nature Park. It was renamed in 1994 after local environmental campaigner Sue Godfrey, in recognition of the efforts she devoted to the park.

More than 200 species of plants have been recorded and there is a wide variety of invertebrates, including grasshoppers, bush-crickets and six species of butterflies.

The reserve is located between Bronze Street and Berthon Street; Deptford Church Street is to the west, with St Paul's, Deptford on the other side of the street. Adjacent to the east is Ferranti Park.
