= Andy Sturgeon =

British gardener

- Born: 1965 or 1966 (age 60–61)
- Occupation: garden designer
- Partner(s): Thea Thompson, Sarah Didinal (died 2009)
- Children: 3 sons

Andy Sturgeon (born 1965/1966) is a British landscape and garden designer, author, journalist, broadcaster and commentator in the international garden design sector.

== Early life ==
Before graduating from the Welsh College of Horticulture in 1987, Sturgeon worked at the Royal Horticultural Society Garden Wisley, and as a landscape gardener.

== Career ==
He has been included in lists of the United Kingdom's top ten garden designers by The Sunday Times and House & Garden magazine. He has won numerous awards at the RHS Chelsea Flower Show, including nine gold medals and three best in show awards. His Roof Terrace Gardens at Battersea Power Station won the Grand Award in both the 2023 BALI Awards and 2024 Society of Garden Design Awards. In 2011, Sturgeon was made a Fellow of the UK Society of Garden Designers.

His commissions include large country estates, public spaces and rooftop gardens throughout the United Kingdom. He has worked on projects in Asia, Russia, Europe and the Middle East. Some examples of his works include a show garden that he designed for South Korea's first garden festival - the Suncheon Bay Garden Expo, a garden for Great Ormond Street Hospital and a rooftop garden for Axtell House in Soho.

He is a published author, journalist and broadcaster and a commentator in the international garden design sector. He presents the BBC's annual coverage of the RHS Chelsea Flower Show.

He has published several books including Planted, Potted on indoor plants, and most recently Big Plans, Small Gardens.

== Personal life ==
Sturgeon lives in Brighton with his wife, the ceramicist Thea Thompson. He has three sons with his partner Sarah Didinal, who died suddenly in summer 2009, aged 37.

He has travelled extensively to observe gardens and plants in their natural habitats, including a plant hunt in Madagascar and a seed-collecting expedition in Kenya for the Millennium Seed Bank.

== Publications ==
- Andy Sturgeon (1999-09-02). Planted. Hodder & Stoughton. ISBN 0-340-74885-0.
- Andy Sturgeon (2001-02-12). Potted. Conran Octopus. ISBN 1-84091-174-3.
- Andy Sturgeon (April 2007). House Plants. Conran Octopus. ISBN 978-1-84091-474-0.
- Andy Sturgeon (2010-04-05). Big Plans, Small Gardens. Mitchell Beazley. ISBN 978-1-84533-372-0.
