= Battersea Power Station =

Decommissioned coal-fired power station

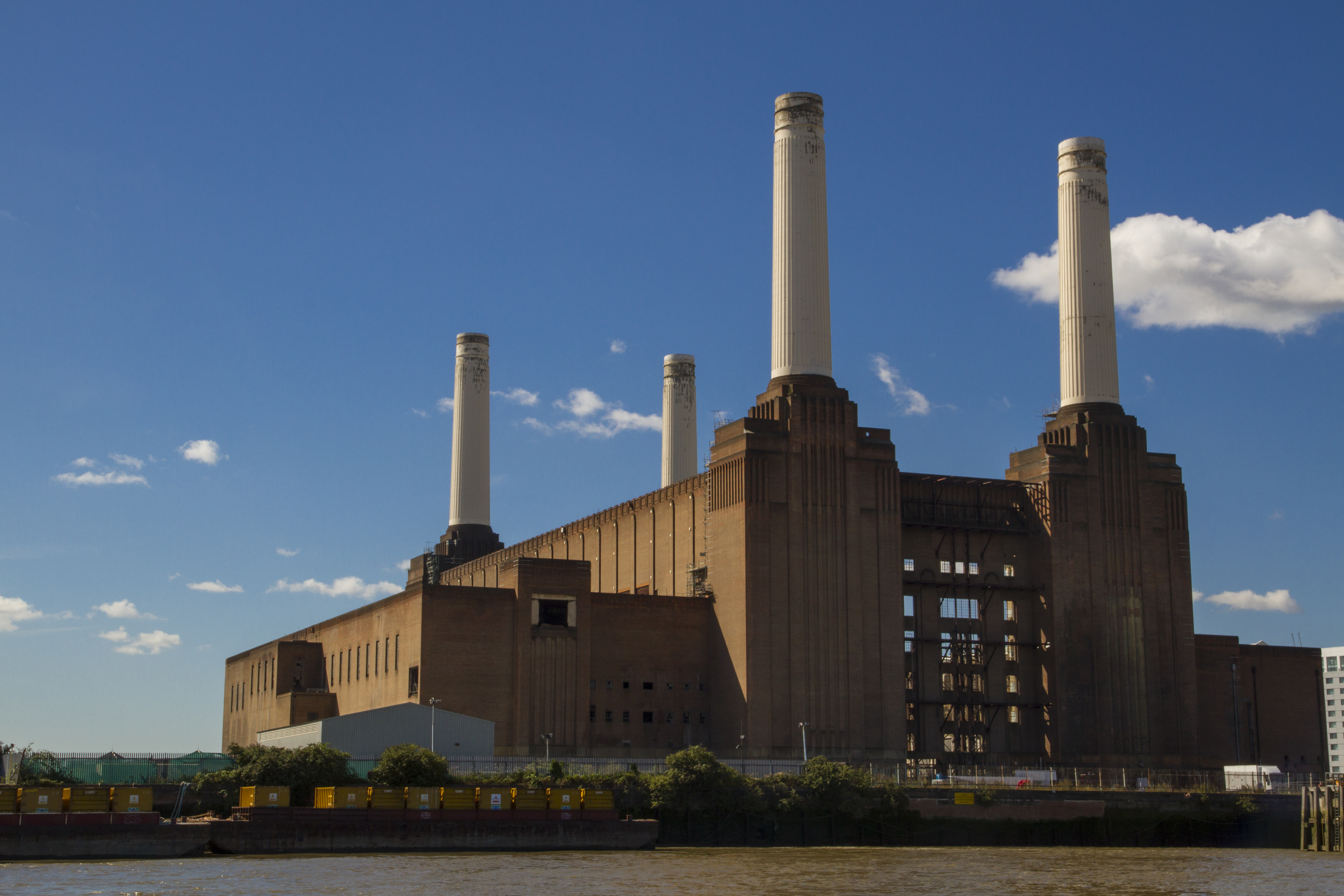
- Battersea Power Station; Viewed from the north bank of the Thames in August 2012
- Official name: Battersea A and B power stations
- Country: England
- Location: Nine Elms, Wandsworth, London
- Coordinates: 51°28′54″N 0°8′41″W
- Status: Decommissioned and redeveloped
- Construction began: 1929 (A station); 1945 (B station)
- Commission date: 1933–35 (A station); 1953–55 (B station)
- Decommission date: 1975 (A station); 1983 (B station)
- Construction cost: £2,141,550 (A station)
- Owners: London Power Company (1939–1948); British Electricity Authority (1948–1955); Central Electricity Authority (1955–1957); Central Electricity Generating Board (1957–1983)
- Employees: 1,000

Thermal power station
- Primary fuel: Coal
- Secondary fuel: Oil (A station only)
- Chimneys: 4
- Cooling towers: None
- Cooling source: River Thames

Power generation
- Units operational: A station: Two 69 MW Metropolitan-Vickers (MV) British Thomson-Houston and one 105 MW Metropolitan-Vickers; B station:Two 100 MW and one 72 MW Metropolitan-Vickers
- Nameplate capacity: 1935: 243 MW; 1955: 503 MW; 1975: 488 MW; 1983: 146 MW

External links
- Website: batterseapowerstation.co.uk
- Commons: Related media on Commons

Listed Building – Grade II*
- Official name: Battersea Power Station
- Designated: 14 October 1980
- Reference no.: 1357620

Battersea Power Station is a preserved coal-fired power station located on the south bank of the River Thames in Nine Elms in the London Borough of Wandsworth. It was built by the London Power Company (LPC) to the design of Leonard Pearce, Engineer in Chief to the LPC, and CS Allott & Son Engineers. The architects were J. Theo Halliday and Giles Gilbert Scott. The station is one of the world's largest brick buildings and notable for its original, Art Deco interior fittings and decor.

The building comprises two power stations, built in two stages, in a single building. Battersea A Power Station was built between 1929 and 1935 and Battersea B Power Station, to its east, between 1937 and 1941, when construction was paused owing to the worsening effects of the Second World War. The building was completed in 1955. Battersea B was built to a design nearly identical to that of Battersea A, creating the iconic four-chimney structure.

Battersea A was decommissioned in 1975. In 1980 the whole structure was given Grade II listed status; Battersea B shut three years later. In 2007 its listed status was upgraded to Grade II*. The building remained empty until 2014, during which time it fell into near ruin. Various plans were made to make use of the building, but none were successful.

In 2012, administrators Ernst & Young entered into an agreement with Malaysia's S P Setia and Sime Darby to develop the site to include residential, bars, restaurants, office space (occupied by Apple and others), shops and entertainment spaces. The plans were approved and redevelopment commenced a few years later. The main Power Station building was opened to the public in October 2022.

As of 2023, the building and the overall 42-acre (17 ha) site development is owned by a consortium of Malaysian investors.

The station is also notable for its appearance on the cover of rock band Pink Floyd's 1977 studio album Animals.

== History ==
Located on the south bank of the River Thames, in Nine Elms, Battersea, an inner-city district of South West London, the building comprises two power stations, built in two stages in a single building. Battersea A Power Station was built in the 1930s and Battersea B Power Station, to its east, in the 1950s. They were built to a near-identical design, providing the four-chimney structure. The station is one of the world's largest brick buildings, and notable for its original, lavish Art Deco interior fittings and decor.

Until the late 1930s, electricity had been supplied by municipal undertakings. These were small power companies that built power stations dedicated to a single industry or group of factories, and sold any excess electricity to the public. These companies used widely differing standards of voltage and frequency. In 1925, Parliament decided that the power grid should be a single system with uniform standards and under public ownership. Several of the private power companies reacted to the proposal by forming the London Power Company (LPC). They planned to heed Parliament's recommendations and build a small number of very large stations.

The London Power Company's first of these super power stations was planned for the Battersea area, on the south bank of the River Thames in London. The proposal was made in 1927, for a station built in two stages and capable of generating 400 megawatts (MW) of electricity when complete. The site chosen was a 15-acre (61,000 m^{2}) plot of land which had been the site of the reservoirs for the former Southwark and Vauxhall Waterworks Company. The site was chosen for its proximity to the River Thames for cooling water and coal delivery, and because it was in the heart of London, the station's immediate supply area.

The proposal sparked protests from those who felt that the building would be too large and would be an eyesore, as well as worries about the pollution damaging local buildings, parks and even paintings in the nearby Tate Gallery. The company addressed the former concern by hiring Sir Giles Gilbert Scott to design the building's exterior. He was a distinguished architect and industrial designer, famous for his designs for the red telephone box and Liverpool Anglican Cathedral. He subsequently designed another London power station, Bankside, which now houses Tate Modern art gallery. The pollution issue was resolved by granting permission for the station on the condition that its emissions were to be treated, to ensure they were "clean and smokeless".

Construction of the first phase (the A station) began in March 1929. The main building work was carried out by John Mowlem & Co, and the structural steelwork erection carried out by Sir William Arrol & Co. Other contractors were employed for specialist tasks. Most of the electrical equipment, including the steam turbine turbo generators, was produced by Metropolitan-Vickers in Trafford Park, Manchester. The building of the steel frame began in October 1930. Once completed, the construction of the brick cladding began, in March 1931. Until the construction of the B station, the eastern wall of the boiler house was clad in corrugated metal sheeting as a temporary enclosure. The A station first generated electricity in 1933, but was not completed until 1935. The total cost of its construction was £2,141,550. Between construction beginning in 1929 and 1933, there were six fatal and 201 non-fatal accidents on the site.

After the end of the Second World War, construction began on the second phase, the B station. The station came into operation gradually between 1953 and 1955. It was nearly identical to the A station from the outside and was constructed directly to its east as a mirror to it, which gave the power station its now familiar four-chimney layout. The construction of the B station brought the site's generating capacity up to 509 MW, making it the third largest generating site in the UK at the time, providing a fifth of London's electricity needs (with the remainder supplied by 28 smaller stations). It was also the most thermally efficient power station in the world when it opened.

The A station had been operated by the London Power Company, but by the time the B station was completed, the UK's electric supply industry had been nationalised, and ownership of the two stations had passed into the hands of the British Electricity Authority in 1948.

On 20 April 1964, a fire at the power station caused power failures throughout London, including at the BBC Television Centre, which was due to launch BBC2 that night; the launch was delayed until the following morning.

The power station was decommissioned between 1975 and 1983. In 1980, it was designated as a Grade II listed building. The structure remained largely unused for more than 30 years after closure. In 2007, its listed status was upgraded to Grade II*. In 2008, its condition was described as "very bad" by English Heritage in its Heritage at Risk Register. The site was also listed on the 2004 World Monuments Watch by the World Monuments Fund.

Since the station's closure, redevelopment plans have been drawn up by successive site owners. After a redevelopment project by Parkview International stalled in 2004, the site was sold to the administrators of Irish company Real Estate Opportunities (REO) for £400 million in November 2006, with plans to refurbish the station for public use and build 3,400 homes on the site. This plan fell through due to REO's debt being called in by the state-owned banks of the UK and Ireland. In December 2011, the site was again put up for sale through commercial estate agent Knight Frank. The combination of an existing debt burden of £750 million, the need to make a £200 million contribution to an extension to the London Underground, requirements to fund conservation of the derelict power station shell, and the presence of a waste transfer station and cement plant on the river frontage made commercial development of the site a significant challenge.

== Design and specification ==
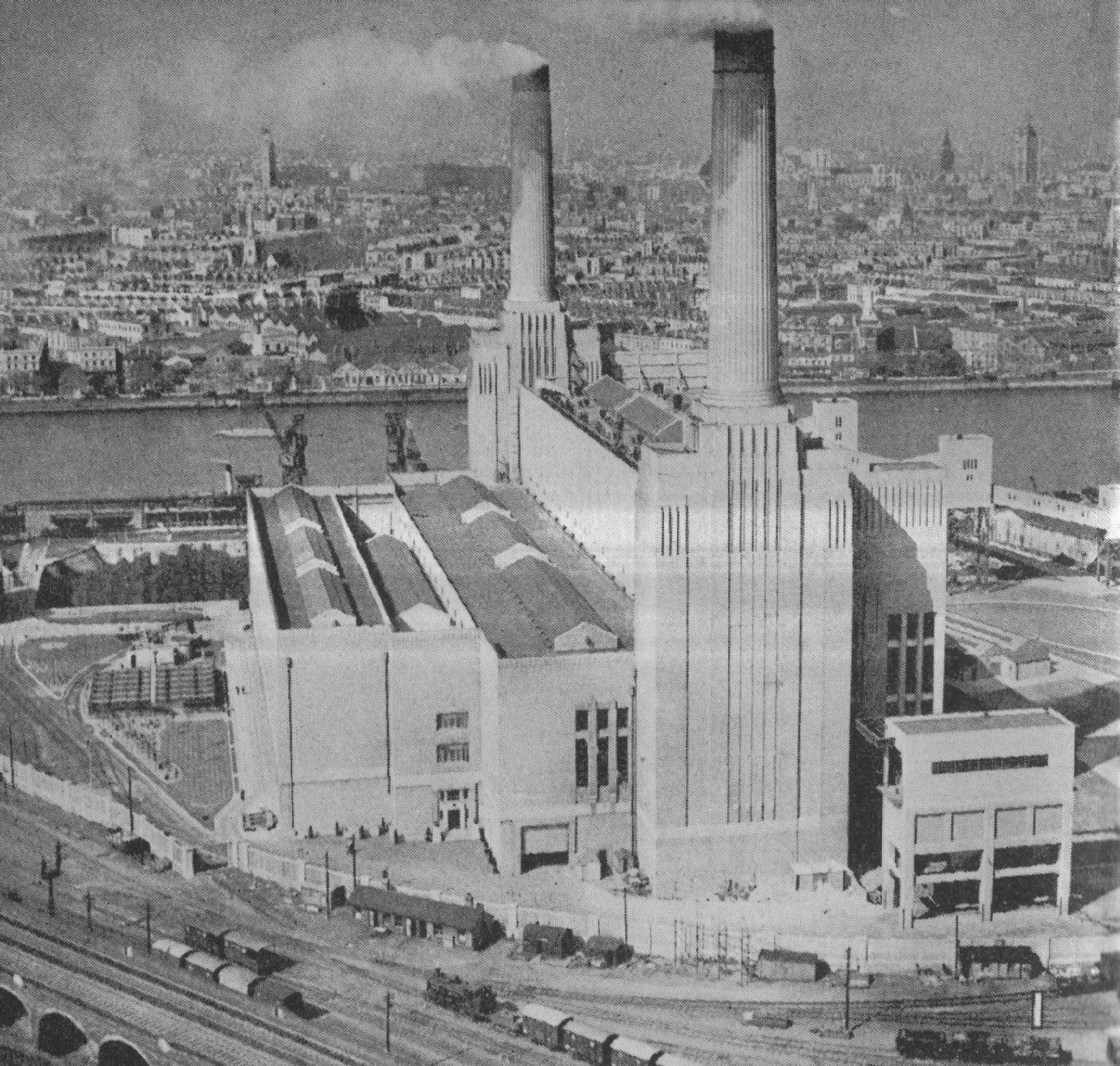
Battersea power station was built in two phases. This is the power station in 1934, with the first phase operational

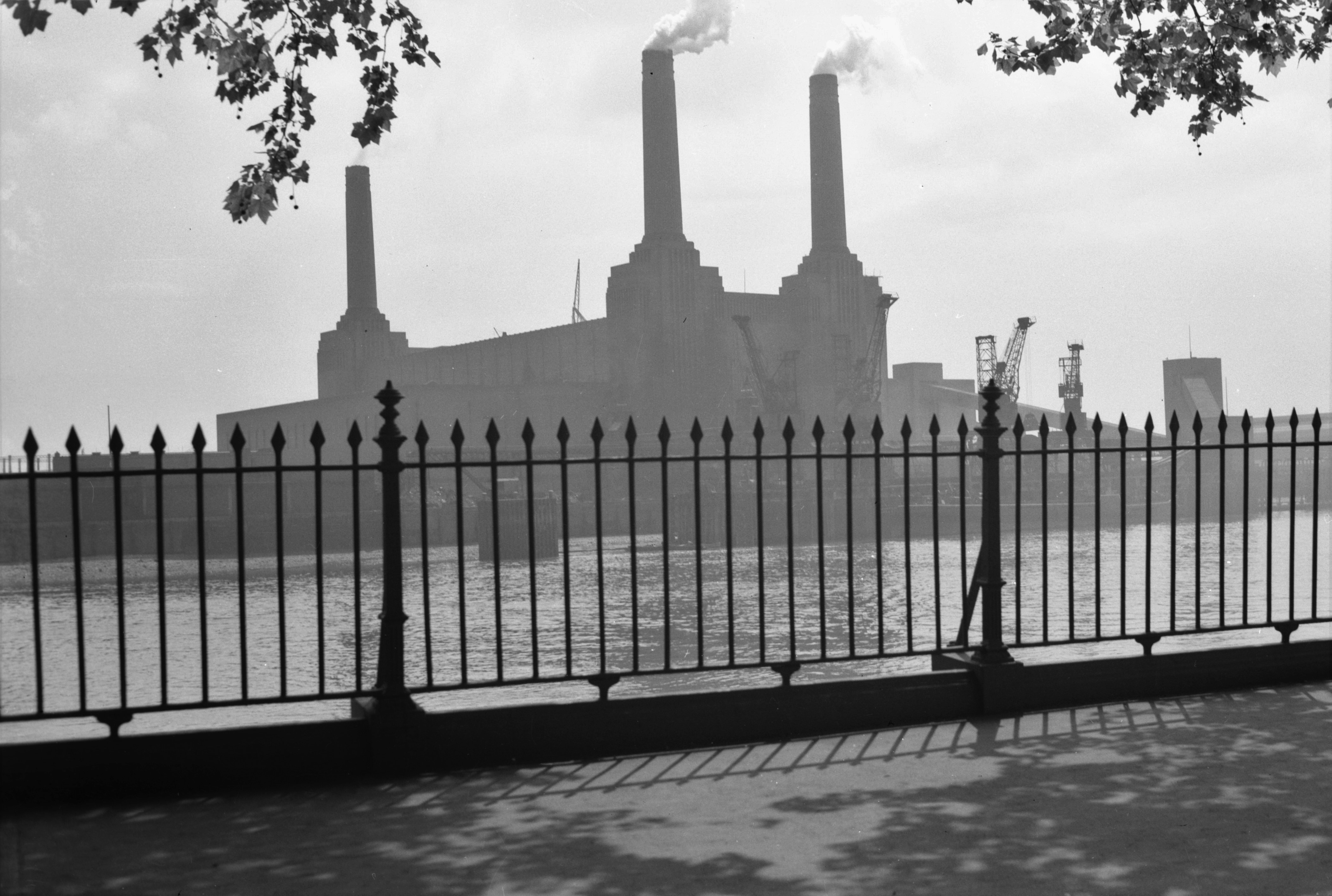
Battersea power station in 1950

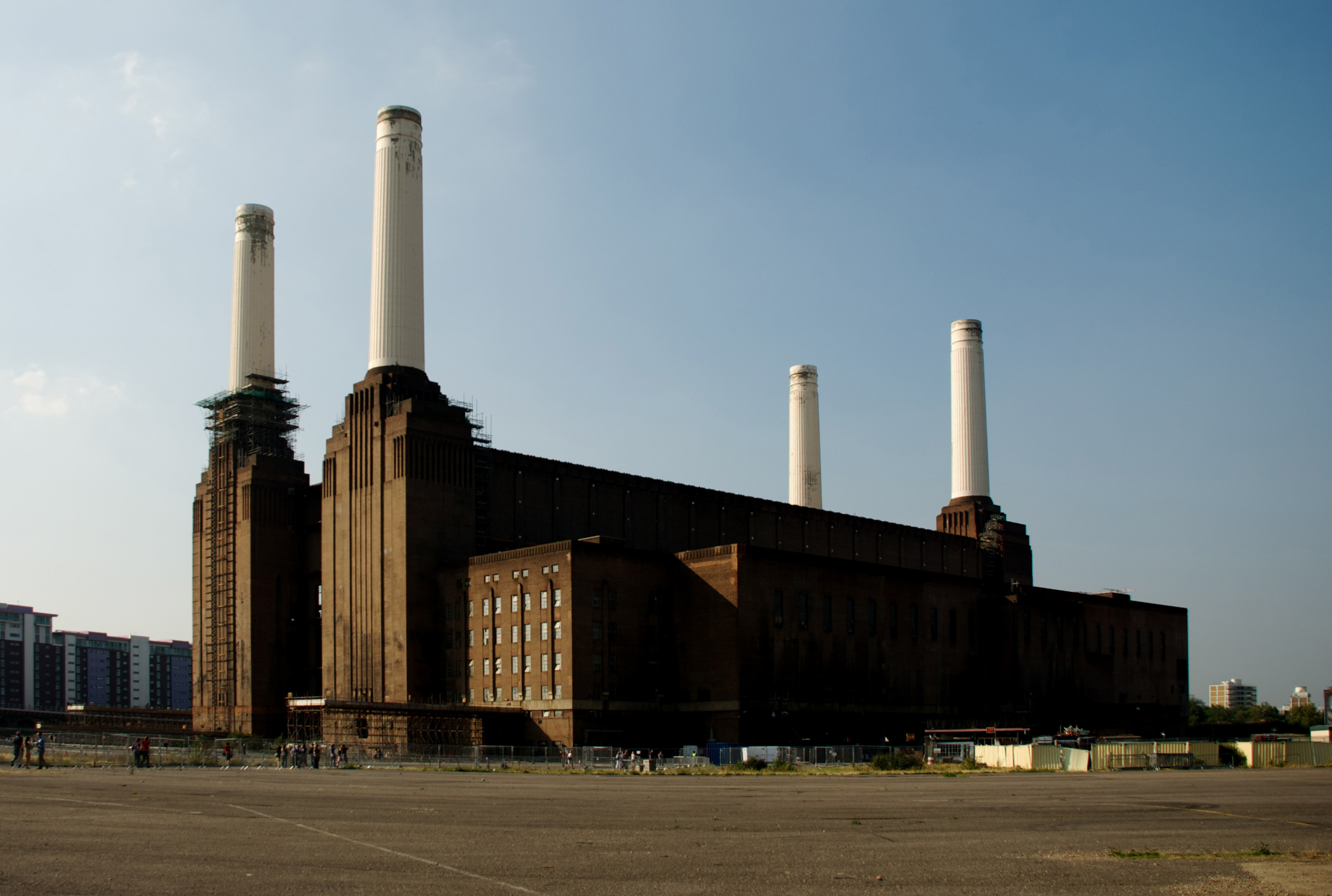
Battersea power station was designed in the brick cathedral style

Both of the stations were designed by a team of architects and engineers. The team was headed by Leonard Pearce, the chief engineer of the London Power Company, but a number of other notable engineers were also involved, including Henry Newmarch Allott, and T. P. O'Sullivan who was later responsible for the Assembly Hall at Filton. J. Theo Halliday was employed as architect, with Halliday & Agate employed as a sub-consultant. Halliday was responsible for the supervision and execution of the appearance of the exterior and interior of the building. Architect Sir Giles Gilbert Scott was involved in the project much later on, consulted to appease public reaction, and referred to in the press as "architect of the exterior". The station was designed in the brick-cathedral style of power station design, which was popular at the time. Battersea is one of a very small number of examples of this style of power station design still in existence in the UK, others being Uskmouth and Bankside. The station's design proved popular straightaway, and was described as a "temple of power", which ranked equal with St Paul's Cathedral as a London landmark. In a 1939 survey by The Architectural Review, a panel of celebrities ranked it as their second favourite modern building.

The A station's control room was given many Art Deco fittings by architect Halliday. Italian marble was used in the turbine hall, and polished parquet floors and wrought-iron staircases were used throughout. Owing to a lack of available money following the Second World War, the interior of the B station was not given the same treatment, and instead the fittings were made from stainless steel.

Each of the two connected stations consists of a long boiler house with a chimney at each end and an adjacent turbine hall. This makes a single main building which is of steel frame construction with brick cladding, similar to the skyscrapers built in the United States around the same time. The station is the largest brick structure in Europe. The building's gross dimensions measure 160 m (520 ft) by 170 m (560 ft), with the roof of the boiler house standing at over 50 m (160 ft). Each of the four chimneys is made from concrete and stands 103 m (338 ft) tall with a base diameter of 8.5 m (28 ft) tapering to 6.7 m (22 ft) at the top. The station also had jetty facilities for unloading coal, a coal sorting and storage area, control rooms and an administration block.

The A station generated electricity using three turbo alternators; two 69 MW Metropolitan-Vickers British Thomson-Houston sets, and one 105 MW Metropolitan-Vickers set, totalling 243 MW. At the time of its commissioning, the 105 MW generating set was the largest in Europe. The B station also had three turbo alternators, all made by Metropolitan-Vickers. This consisted of two units which used 16 MW high-pressure units exhausting to a 78 MW and associated with a 6 MW house alternator, giving these units a total rating of 100 MW. The third unit consisted of a 66 MW machine associated with a 6 MW house alternator, giving the unit a rating of 72 MW. Combined, these gave the B station a generating capacity of 260 MW, making the site's generating capacity 503 MW. All of the station's boilers were made by Babcock & Wilcox, fuelled by pulverised coal from pulverisers also built by Babcock & Wilcox. There were nine boilers in the A station and six in the B station. The B station's boilers were the largest ever built in the UK at that time. The B station also had the highest thermal efficiency of any power station in the country for the first 12 years of its operation.

== Operations ==
=== Coal transportation ===
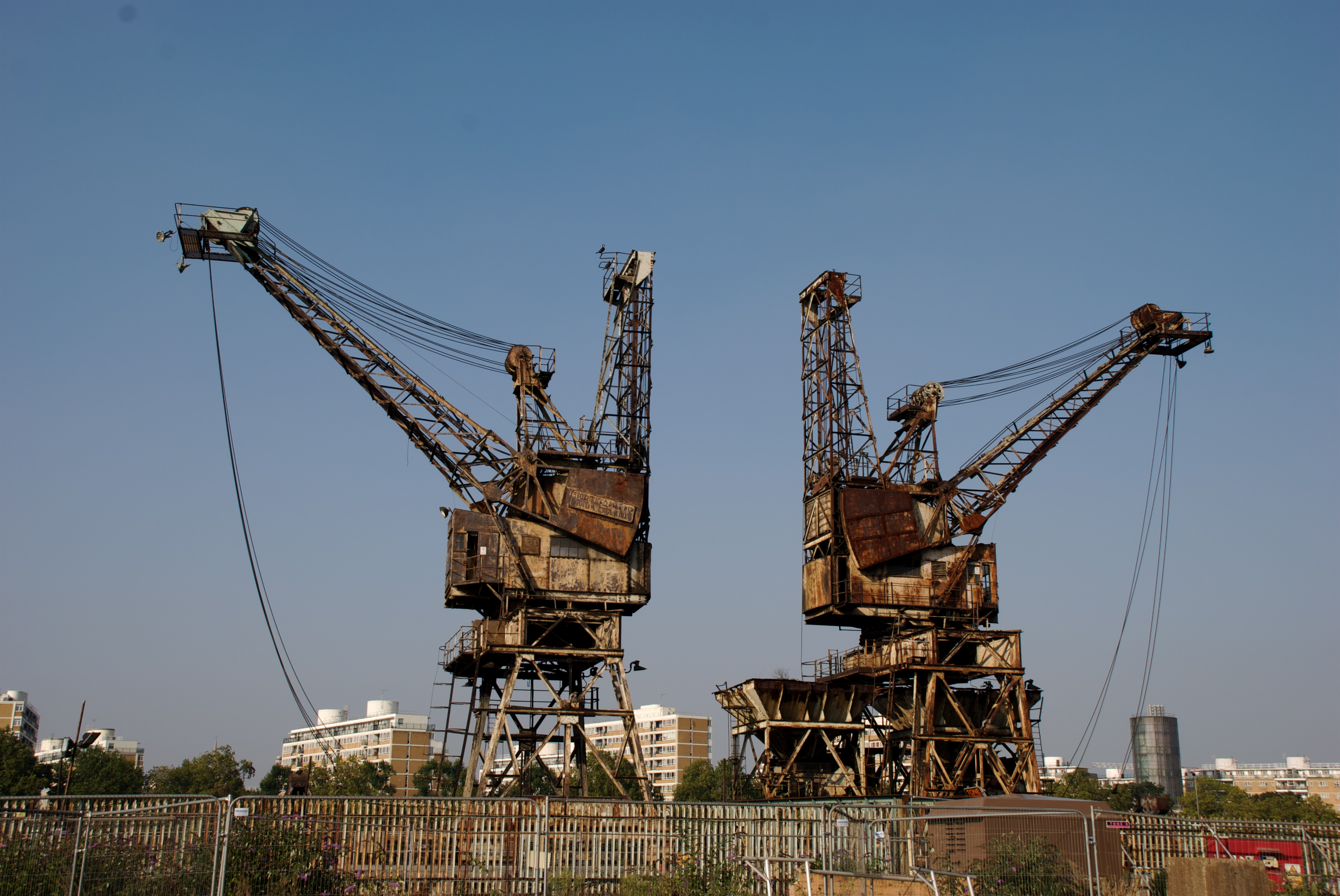
Coal was usually brought to the station by colliers, and unloaded by cranes. These two cranes, pictured in 2008, were removed in 2014.

The power station consumed over 1,000,000 tonnes of coal annually, mostly from pits in South Wales and North East England, delivered by coastal colliers. These were "flat-irons" with a low-profile superstructure and fold-down funnels and masts to fit under the River Thames's bridges above the Pool of London. The LPC and its nationalised successors owned and operated several "flat-irons" for this service.

Coal was usually delivered to the jetty where two cranes, capable of unloading two ships at a time at a rate of 480 tonnes an hour, offloaded coal. Some coal was delivered by rail to the east of the station from the Brighton Main Line which passes nearby. A conveyor belt system moved the coal to a storage area or directly to the station's boiler rooms. The conveyor belt system consisted of a series of bridges connected by towers. The storage area was a large concrete box capable of holding 75,000 tonnes of coal. It had an overhead gantry and a conveyor belt attached to the conveyor belt system for moving coal to the boiler rooms.

=== Water system ===
Water, essential to a thermal power station, is used to condense steam from the steam turbines before it is returned to the boiler. Water cycled through the power station's systems was taken from the Thames. The station could extract an average of 1.5 million cubic metres (340 million imperial gallons) of water from the river each day.

After the end of World War II, the London Power Company used the waste heat to supply the Pimlico District Heating Undertaking.

=== Scrubbers ===
The reduction of sulphur emissions was an important factor from when the station was in the design stages, as it was one of the main concerns of the protesters. The London Power Company developed an experimental technique for washing flue gases in 1925. It used water and alkaline sprays over scrubbers of steel and timber in flue ducts. The gases were subject to continuous washing; as to the principal acid pollutant by using the catalyst iron oxide, the sulphur dioxide was converted into sulphuric acid. The plant was one of the world's first commercial applications of this technique. This process was stopped in the B station in the 1960s, when it was discovered that the discharge of these products into the Thames was more harmful than sulphur dioxide would be to the atmosphere.

=== Electricity output ===
Electricity output from Battersea A & B power stations over the period 1964–1983 was as follows.

== Closure and redevelopment ==
=== Closure ===
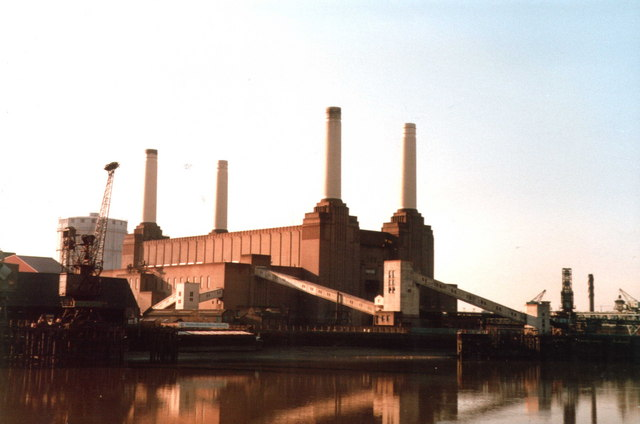
The station in November 1986, three years after ceasing to generate electricity

The station's demise was caused by its output falling with age, coupled with increased operating costs, such as flue gas cleaning. On 17 March 1975, the A station was closed after being in operation for 40 years. By this time the A station was co-firing oil and its generating capacity had declined to 228 MW.

Three years after the closure of the A station, rumours began to circulate that the B station would soon follow. A campaign was then launched to try to save the building as part of the national heritage. As a result, the station was declared a heritage site in 1980, when the Secretary of State for the Environment, Michael Heseltine, awarded the building Grade II listed status. (This was upgraded to Grade II* listed in 2007.) On 31 October 1983 production of electricity at Station B also ended, after nearly 30 years of operation. By then the B station's generating capacity had fallen to 146 MW. The closure of the two stations was put down largely to the generating equipment becoming outdated, and the preferred choice of fuel for electricity generation shifting from coal toward oil, gas and nuclear power.

=== Theme park proposal ===
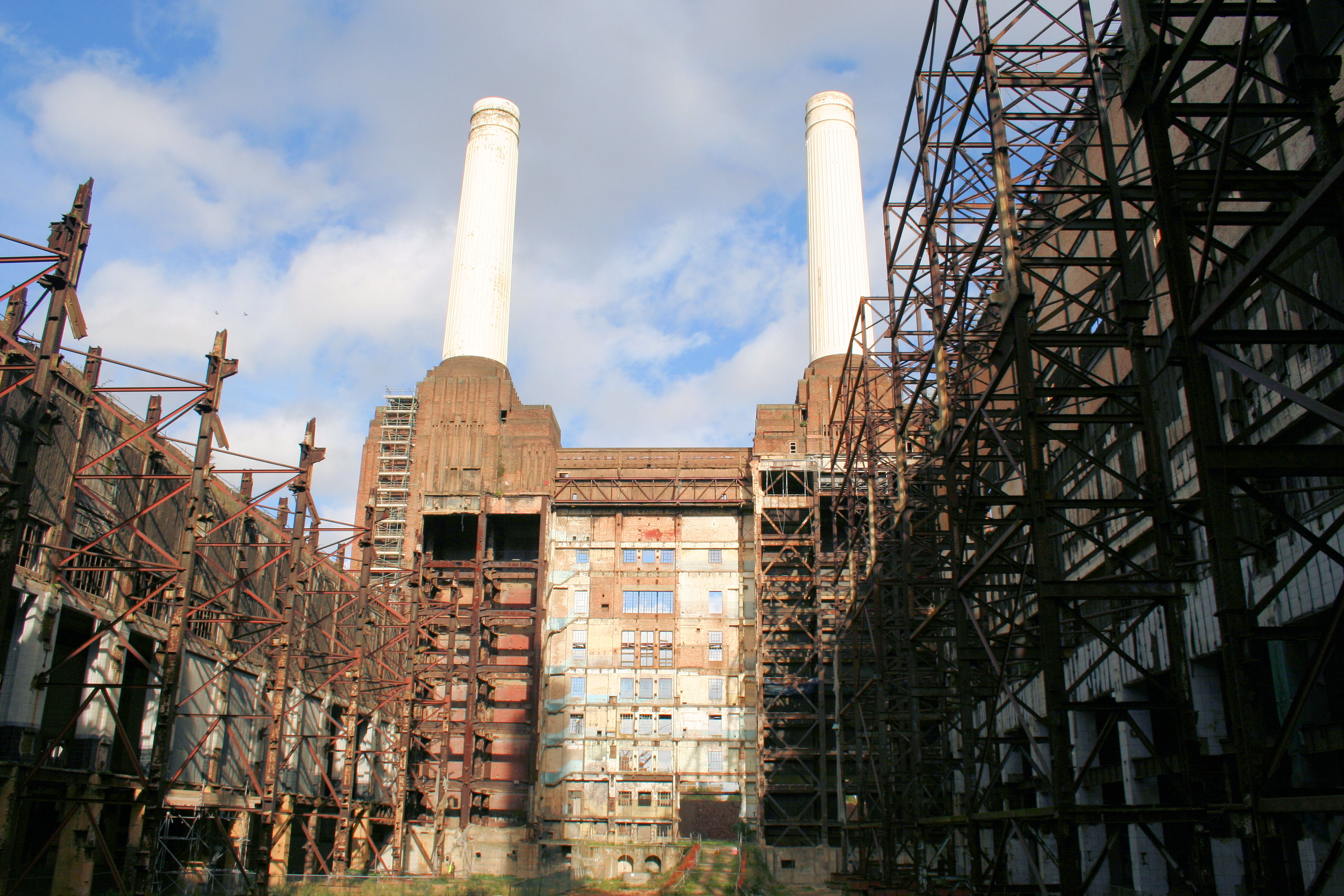
The station's roof was removed in the late 1980s, when there were plans to convert the structure into a theme park.

Following the station's closure, the Central Electricity Generating Board had planned to demolish the station and sell the land for housing, but because of the building's then Grade II listed status, they had to pay the high cost of preserving the building. In 1983 they held a competition for ideas on the redevelopment of the site. It was won by a consortium led by developer David Roche and which included John Broome, Chairman of Alton Towers.

This consortium proposed an indoor theme park, with shops and restaurants. At an estimated cost of £35 million, the scheme was risky and would require over 2 million visitors a year to make any profit. The scheme received planning approval in May 1986 and the site was purchased by Alton Towers for £1.5 million in 1987. Work on converting the site began the same year. British Rail planned to procure three electric multiple unit trains, designated "Class 447", to run a shuttle service from London Victoria station to the theme park.

The project was halted in March 1989 for lack of funding, after costs had quickly escalated that January, from £35 million to £230 million. By this point, huge sections of the building's roof had been removed so that machinery could be taken out. Without a roof, the building's steel framework had been left exposed and its foundations were prone to flooding.

In March 1990, the proposal was changed to a mixture of offices, shops and a hotel. This proposal was granted planning permission in August 1990, despite opposition from 14 independent organisations, including English Heritage, however no further work took place on the site between 1990 and 1993.

=== Parkview proposal ===
In 1993, the site and its outstanding debt of £70 million were bought from the Bank of America by Hong Kong-based development company, Parkview International, for £10 million. Following resolution of creditors' claims, it acquired the freehold title in May 1996. In November 1996 plans for the redevelopment of the site were submitted and outline consent was received in May 1997. Detailed consent for much of the site was granted in August 2000, and the rest in May 2001. The company received full possession of the site in 2003. Having purchased the site, Parkview started work on a £1.1 billion project to restore the building and to redevelop the site into a retail, housing and leisure complex.

During the Parkview era several masterplans for the site were developed by various architects and subsequently discarded. One notable plan, called simply "The Power Station", was masterminded by architect Nicholas Grimshaw. The scheme proposed a shopping mall, with 40 to 50 restaurants, cafés and bars, 180 shops, as well as nightclubs, comedy venues and a cinema. Cosmopolitan shops would have been sited in the A station's turbine hall, and label name shops in the B station's turbine hall. The boiler house would have been glazed over and used as a public space for installations and exhibitions. A riverside walkway would also be created, running continuously along the riverside from Vauxhall to Battersea Park.

Parkview claimed that 3,000 jobs would be created during the construction of the project, and 9,000 would be employed once completed, with an emphasis on local recruitment. The Battersea Power Station Community Group campaigned against the Parkview plan and argued for an alternative community-based scheme to be drawn up. The group described the plans as "a deeply unattractive project that has no affordable housing anywhere on the 38-acre (150,000 m^{2}) site, no decent jobs for local people and no credible public transport strategy". They also criticised the appropriateness of the project for its location, and the proposal of other large buildings on the site. Keith Garner of the group said "I feel that there's a real problem of appropriateness. They need a completely different kind of scheme, not this airport-lounge treatment. What you see now is a majestic building looming up from the river. If you surround it with buildings 15 storeys high, you don't have a landmark any more."

In 2005 Parkview, English Heritage and the London Borough of Wandsworth said that the reinforcement inside the chimneys was corroded and irreparable. Wandsworth Council granted permission for them to be demolished and rebuilt. However, the Twentieth Century Society, the World Monuments Fund and the Battersea Power Station Company commissioned an alternative engineers' report that concluded that the existing chimneys could be repaired. In response, Parkview said that they had provided a legally binding undertaking to the council to provide certainty that the chimneys would be replaced "like for like", in accordance with the requirements of English Heritage and the planning authorities.

=== Real Estate Opportunities proposal ===
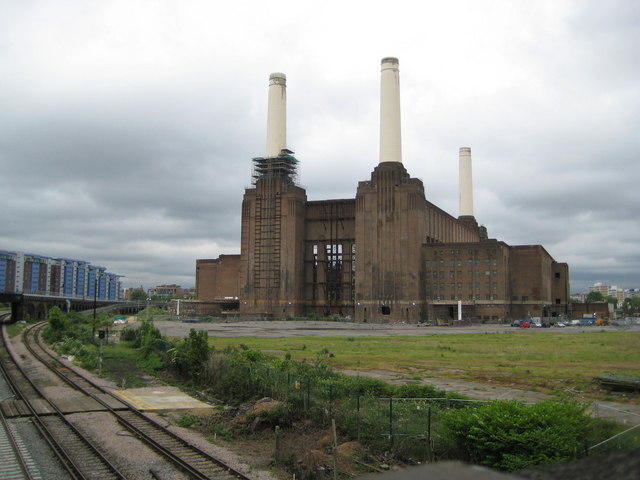
Real Estate Opportunities were granted permission to redevelop the power station in November 2010 showing scaffolding on one of the chimneys

In November 2006, it was announced that Real Estate Opportunities (REO) led by Irish businessmen Richard Barrett and Johnny Ronan of Treasury Holdings, had purchased Battersea Power Station and the surrounding land for €532 million (£400 million). REO subsequently announced that the previous plan by Parkview had been dropped and that it had appointed the practice of the Uruguayan-born architect Rafael Viñoly of New York as the new master planner for the site. The centrepiece of this masterplan was a 980-foot-high "eco tower" that dwarfed the power station and was described by London's then Mayor Boris Johnson as an "inverted toilet-roll holder". The tower was quickly dropped from the scheme. Jersey law firms, Ogier, Carey Olsen and Mourant Ouzannes helped REO to raise funds for the new Battersea Power Station redevelopment.

The plans included reusing part of the station building as a power station, fuelled by biomass and waste. The station's existing chimneys would be utilised for venting steam. The former turbine halls would be converted to shopping spaces, and the roofless boiler house used as a park. An energy museum would also be housed inside the former station building. The restoration of the power station building would cost £150 million.

A plastic built "eco-dome" was to be built to the east of the power station. This building was originally planned to have a large 300 m (980 ft) chimney, but this has now been abandoned in favour of a series of smaller towers. The eco-dome would house offices, and aim to reduce energy consumption in the buildings by 67% compared to conventional office buildings, by using the towers to draw cool air through the building. 3,200 new homes would also be built on the site to house 7,000 people.

In June 2008 a consultation process was launched, which revealed that 66% of the general public were in favour of the plans. At an event at the station on 23 March 2009, it was announced that REO were to submit the planning application for their proposal to Wandsworth Council.

The Council gave planning consent on 11 November 2010. REO hoped construction would begin in 2011, but this was cancelled. The station structure itself was expected to be repaired and secure by 2016, with completion of the whole project by 2020. Plans included the construction of 3,400 apartments and 3,500,000-square-foot (330,000 m^{2}) of office space. Approximately 28,000 inhabitants and 25,000 workers would be expected to occupy the space once complete.

Reuters reported in September 2011 that lenders would allow more time for a new equity partner to be found:

Lenders to the owner of Battersea Power Station in London waived a debt maturity deadline yesterday while talks with potential new equity partners for its redevelopment continued, a source close to the process told Reuters. AIM-listed Real Estate Opportunities is seeking a partner for the 5.5 billion pound ($9 billion) development, and its senior lenders Lloyds and Ireland's National Asset Management Agency have already extended a deadline once relating to the £400 million REO paid for the site in 2006. 'The banks have nothing to gain by calling the debt in. Talks with new equity partners continue, and an announcement may come in the next few weeks,' the source said.

However, in November 2011, Lloyds and NAMA called in the debt and the REO scheme collapsed into administration.

=== Alternative proposals ===
==== Farrell and Partners urban park proposal ====
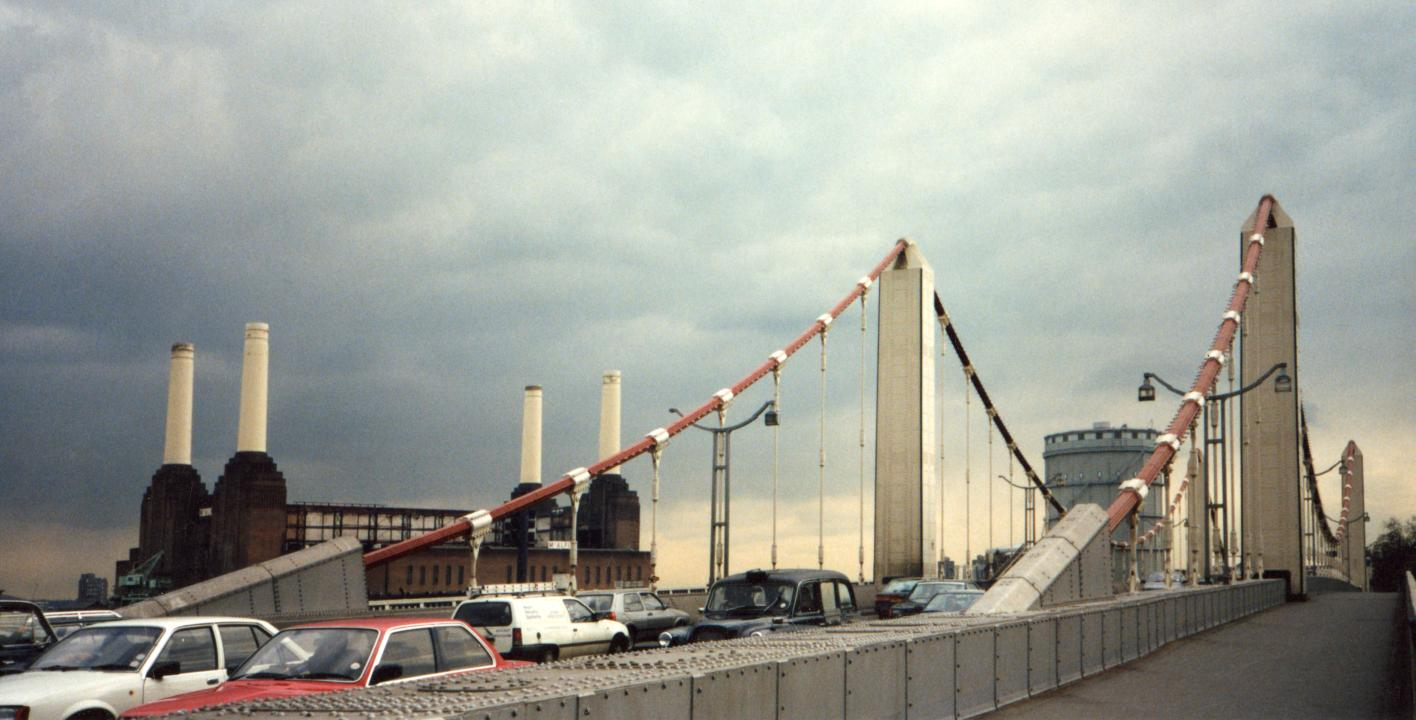
Battersea Power Station from the Chelsea Bridge

In February 2012, Sir Terry Farrell's architectural firm put forward a proposal to convert the power station site into an "urban park" with an option to develop housing at a later date. In this vision, Farrell proposed to demolish all but the central boiler hall and chimneys and display the switching equipment from the control rooms in 'pods'. However, this plan was always unlikely to bear fruit due to the Grade II listing status of the building.

==== Chelsea F.C. interest ====
In November 2008, Chelsea F.C. was reported to be considering moving to a new purpose-built stadium at Battersea Power Station. The proposed stadium was to hold between 65,000 and 75,000 fans and feature a retractable roof. The proposals were designed by HOK Sport, the same company who designed Wembley Stadium. However, the scheme was seriously in doubt due to concerns for the preservation of the site and the collapse of the REO scheme in late November 2011.

On 4 May 2012, Chelsea announced a bid to purchase the site to build a 60,000-seater stadium in conjunction with property developers Almacantar. However the bid was not accepted.

=== 2012 redevelopment plans ===
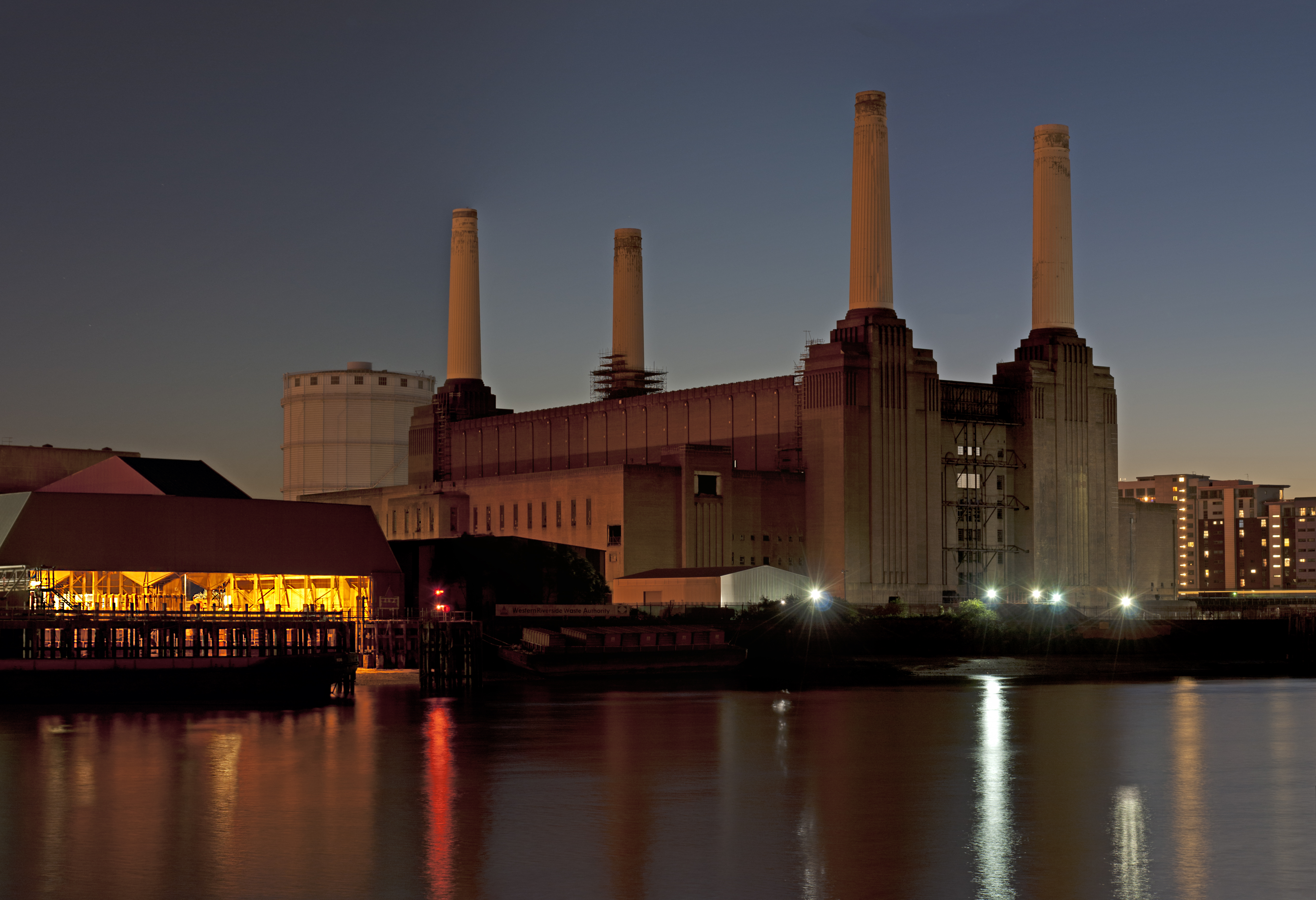
The power station's 39-acre (16 ha) site received much interest, with many submitting bids in the 2012 sale.

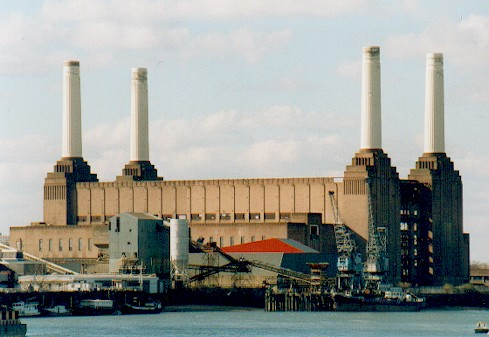
Potential buyers were required to preserve the station's Grade II* listed four iconic chimneys and lime wash towers. The chimneys are protected structures.

Following the failure of the REO bid to develop the site, in February 2012, the power station was put up for sale on the open market for the first time in its history. The sale was conducted by the commercial estate agent, Knight Frank, on behalf of the site's creditors. In May 2012, several bids were received for the landmark site, which was put on the market after Nama and Lloyds Banking Group called in loans held by Treasury Holdings' Real Estate Opportunities (REO). Bids were received from Chelsea F.C. with other interested parties including a Malaysian interest, SP Setia, London & Regional, a company owned by the London-based Livingstone brothers, and housebuilder Berkeley. The net price was £400 million which would discharge the £325 million to cover the debts held by Nama and Lloyds plus a £100 million contribution to the Northern line extension. If the sale was unsuccessful, the administrator or its agent(s) would have kept the landowner's duty to maintain and preserve the site per its listed status.

==== Agreement with Malaysian developers ====
In June 2012, Knight Frank announced that administrators Ernst & Young had entered into an exclusive agreement with Malaysian developers S P Setia (a property company), Sime Darby (a trading conglomerate) and Employees Provident Fund (Malaysia's largest pension fund). Following due diligence and agreement of the final terms of the deal, the sale to the Malaysian consortium was completed in September 2012.

The redevelopment of the site used the existing Vinoly master plan, which intended to position the power station as the central focus of the regenerated site, housing a blend of shops, cafes, restaurants, art and leisure facilities, office space and residential accommodation. The plan included the restoration of the historic power station itself, the creation of a new riverside park to the north of the power station and the creation of a new High Street designed to link the entrance to Battersea Power Station tube station with the power station. The redevelopment hoped to bring about the extension of the existing riverside walk and facilitate access directly from the power station to Battersea Park and Chelsea Bridge. The full redevelopment consisted of eight main phases, some of which were planned to run concurrently. The plan included over 800 homes of varying sizes.

Construction work on Phase 1, called Circus West Village, designed by architects SimpsonHaugh and dRMM, was undertaken by Carillion and commenced in 2013 alongside work on the power station. Phase 1 was completed in 2017, with the Northern line extension and its new Battersea Power Station terminus completed in 2021. Circus West Village has over 1500 residents and over 23 restaurants, cafes and retailers.

WilkinsonEyre was appointed in 2013 to carry out the restoration of the Grade II* listed Power Station. Work commenced in 2013 and plans included the restoration of the art deco structure internally and externally, reconstruction of the chimneys, and refurbishment of the historic cranes and jetty as a new river taxi stop. Restoration work on the power station's chimneys was completed in 2017. In 2019, the jetty in front of the power station opened to the public for the first time in its history. Retail brands inside the power station include BOSS, Jo Malone London, Uniqlo, MAC Cosmetics, Space NK, Watches of Switzerland and many more. In May 2021, the first residents moved into their new homes at the power station. As part of the development, a 200-seat theatre, the Turbine Theatre, was established in railway arches under the Grosvenor Bridge in September 2019.

In October 2013, Frank Gehry was appointed joint architect with Foster + Partners to design "Phase 3" of the scheme, which will provide "the gateway to the entire development and the new Northern line extension".

=== London Underground extension ===
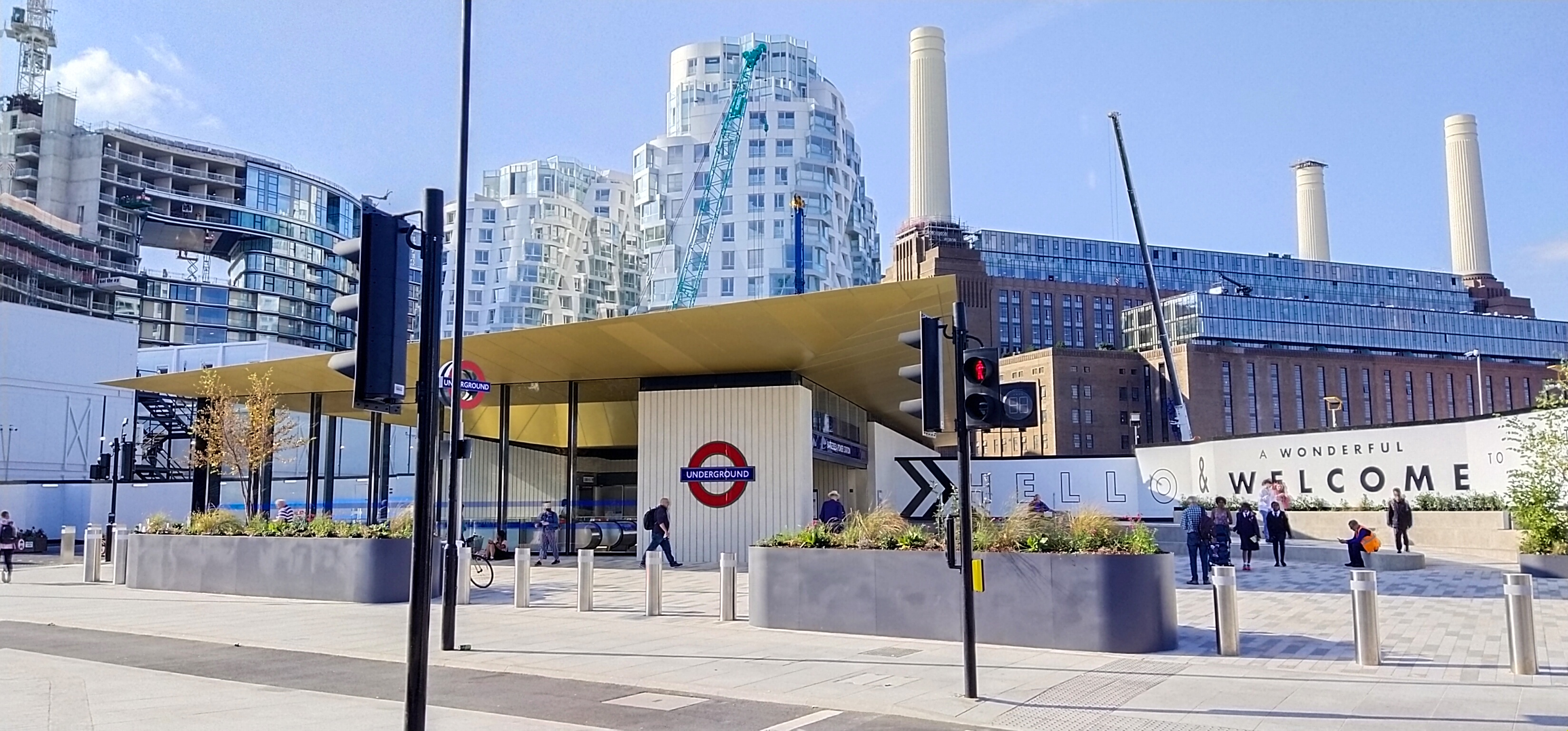
Battersea Power Station tube station, with the Power Station and new development behind

The London Underground's Northern line was extended to serve Nine Elms and the power station, branching off at Kennington station. Two stations, Nine Elms station and Battersea Power Station station, opened on 20 September 2021. The construction cost £1.1 billion and is 2 miles (3.2 km) long. The developers provided £270m towards the construction of the extension.

=== 2022 opening ===
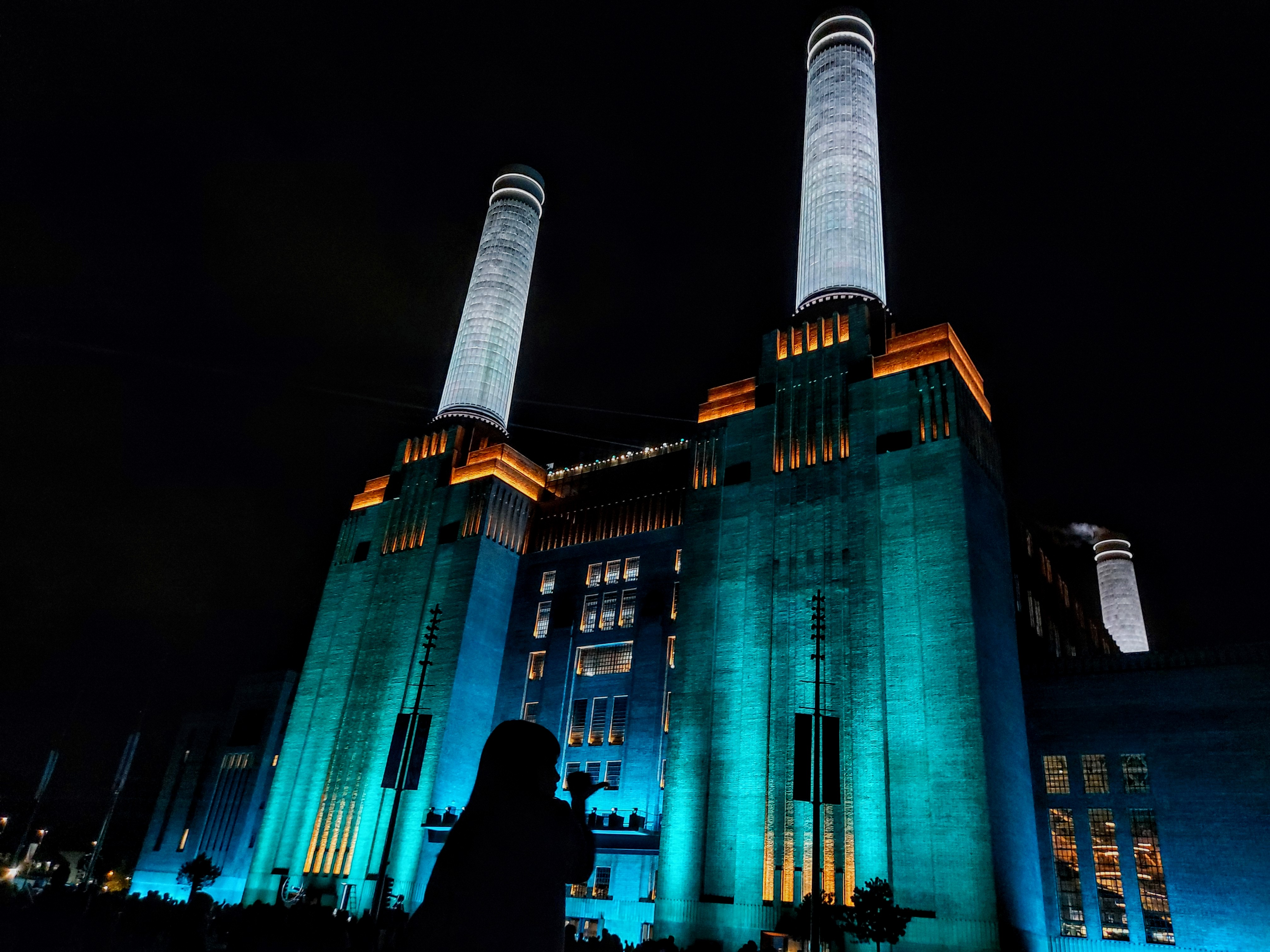
The Station on its opening night as a shopping mall in 2022 the chimneys glow up to mark the opening night

Works were completed and nearly forty years after the lights were switched off, Battersea Power Station opened its doors to the public on Friday 14 October 2022, marking the first time the public were able to explore the iconic building and the first tranche of shops, bars, restaurants and leisure venues.

Electric Boulevard, a new pedestrianised high street, that runs between Gehry Partners' Prospect Place and Foster + Partners' Battersea Roof Gardens to the riverside neighbourhood's Zone 1 London Underground Station, opened the same day.

As well as 254 apartments inside the power station itself, the 42-acre site also contains apartment buildings designed by US architect Frank Gehry and by Foster + Partners. The first residents had moved in to the power station in May 2021. The wider public realm was masterplanned by LDA Design, which delivered the landscape proposals, pedestrian routes and public spaces across the site. The Battersea Roof Gardens, located above the Foster + Partners building, were created in collaboration with James Corner of Field Operations, known for the High Line in New York, with LDA Design working as delivery landscape architect. The Power Station Roof Gardens have been designed by Andy Sturgeon and his team. It won the Garden of the Year Award 2024 of the Society of Garden Designers.

=== Apple ===
In September 2016, Apple announced plans to consolidate 1,400 London employees, from eight locations, by 2021, occupying around 500,000 square feet (46,000 m^{2}) of the power station building as its new London headquarters. The move was later delayed by the COVID-19 pandemic, with the Apple offices opening in 2023.

== Event venue ==
The power station has been used for various sporting, cultural and political events. Since 22 August 2009, the station has been used as a venue on the Red Bull X-Fighters season. On 13 April 2010, the station was used as the venue for the launch of the Conservative Party's 2010 general election manifesto. Between 6 and 7 May 2010, the station site was used by Sky News in their coverage of the election. In 2023, the power station was used for a light show.

Following the restoration and reopening of the power station in 2022, the restored Art Deco control room of the A station, opened as a private event venue. The 650 square metre space hosts weddings, award ceremonies, brand and product launches, fashion shows and film productions, and has a capacity of up to 220 guests.

In September 2026, Apple announced a new venue called Apple Music Hall would be located at the site. The 600-seat venue will host one-off shows that can be live streamed and viewed worldwide. Sir Elton John performed the opening show on 28 September.

== In popular culture ==
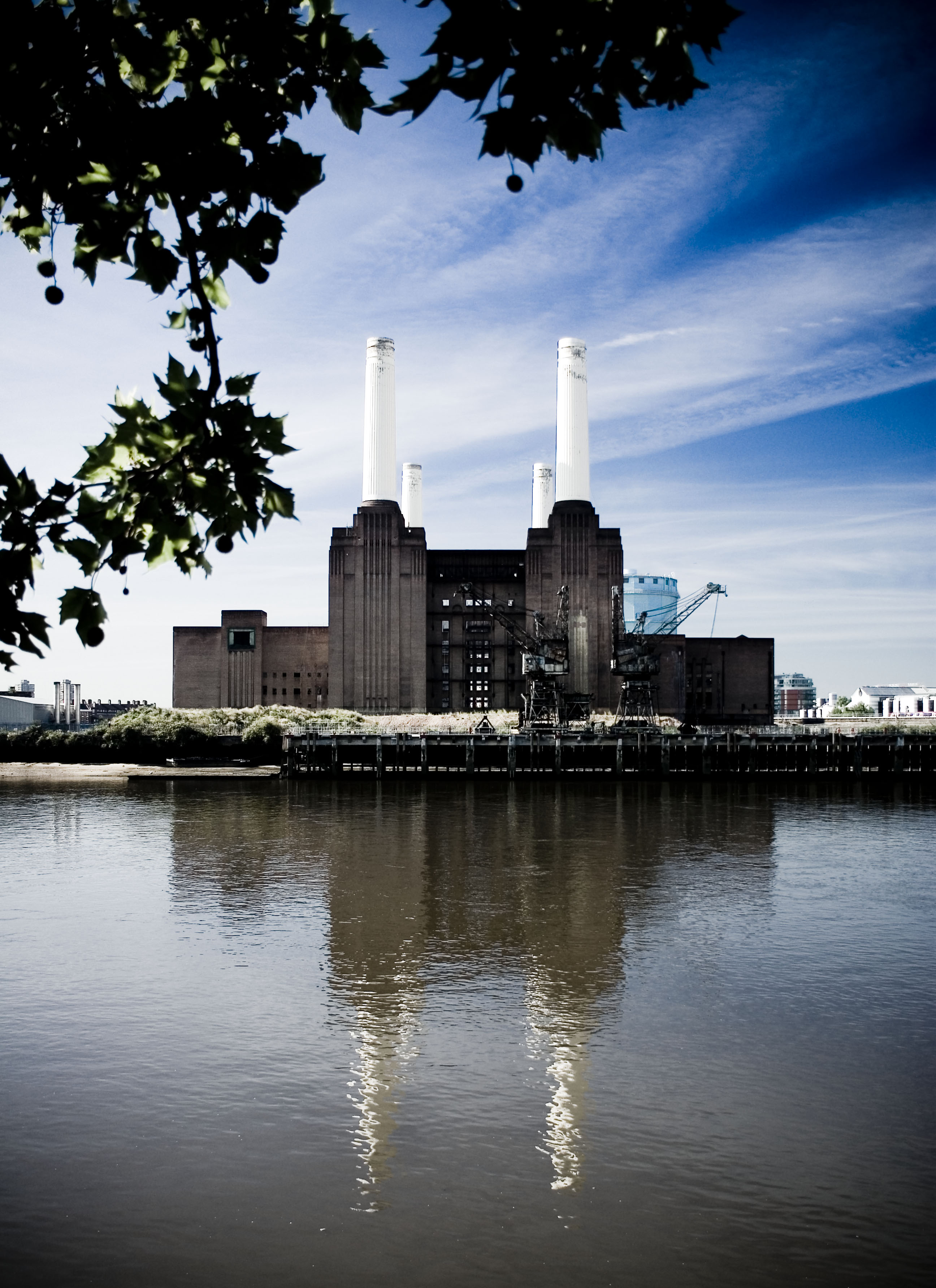
In nearly a century, the power station has become an iconic structure.

Battersea Power Station has become an iconic structure, featured in or used as a shooting location for many films, television programmes, music videos, and video games. One of the station's earliest film appearances was in Alfred Hitchcock's 1936 film Sabotage; this was before the construction of the B station.

The station gained exposure in the cover photograph of Pink Floyd's 1977 album, Animals, which sold millions of copies worldwide. The photo, taken in early December 1976, shows the power station with an inflatable pink pig floating above it. It was tethered to one of the power station's southern chimneys, but broke loose from its moorings and drifted into the flight path of Heathrow Airport. The album itself was officially launched at an event at the power station.

The control room of the A station is used as the backdrop for a scene in Monty Python's The Meaning of Life. The same space, now restored and operating as Control Room A, was also used as a filming location for The King's Speech.

Battersea was used as the filming location for the final battle in Ian McKellen's 1995 adaptation of William Shakespeare's Richard III.

In the 2006 movie Children of Men, it serves as the fictional "Ark of Arts". A pig balloon also appears in the scene as homage to Pink Floyd. Scenes from the 2008 Batman film The Dark Knight were filmed at Battersea.

Battersea Power Station was featured as a playable location in the 2011 racing video game Dirt 3, which included a Gymkhana course set within its grounds. In the 2020 video game Watch Dogs: Legion, it appears as a redeveloped shopping centre. Battersea also appears in 2025's Civilization VII as a wonder associated with the Great Britain civilization.

== See also ==
- Energy in the United Kingdom
- Energy policy of the United Kingdom
