= Deptford Power Station =

Three former coal-fired power stations

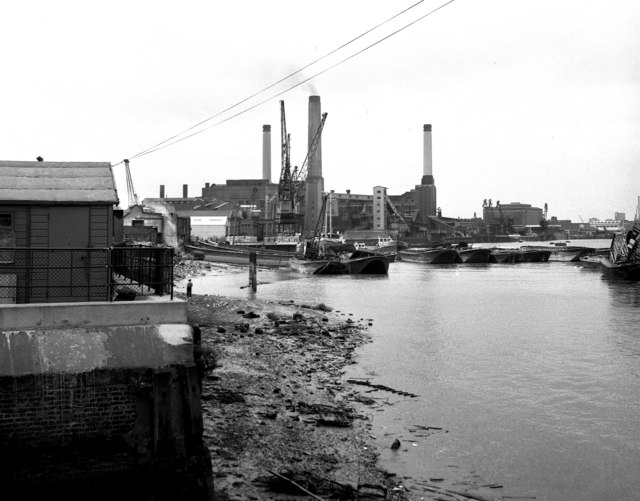
- Deptford West Power Station; Viewed from the east in July 1973
- Country: England
- Location: Greater London
- Coordinates: 51.4824°N 0.0203°W
- Status: Decommissioned and demolished
- Construction began: 1888 (Deptford East LP); 1926 (Deptford West); 1947 (Deptford East HP)
- Commission date: 1891 (Deptford East LP); 1929 (Deptford West); 1953 (Deptford East HP)
- Decommission date: Late 1960s (Deptford East LP); 1972 (Deptford West); 1983 (Deptford East HP)
- Owner: As operator
- Operators: London Electric Supply Corporation (1891–1925); London Power Company (1925–1948); British Electricity Authority (1948–1955); Central Electricity Authority (1955–1957); Central Electricity Generating Board (1958–1983)

Thermal power station
- Primary fuel: Coal
- Chimneys: Ferranti station: 2 (150 feet); Deptford East: 1 polygonal; Deptford West: 2 tall fluted stacks
- Cooling towers: None
- Cooling source: River water

Power generation
- Units operational: (See text)
- Units decommissioned: All
- Nameplate capacity: 448 MW (70 MW approx Deptford East LP, 212 MW Deptford West, 166 MW Deptford East HP)
- Annual net output: (See graphs below)

External links
- Commons: Related media on Commons

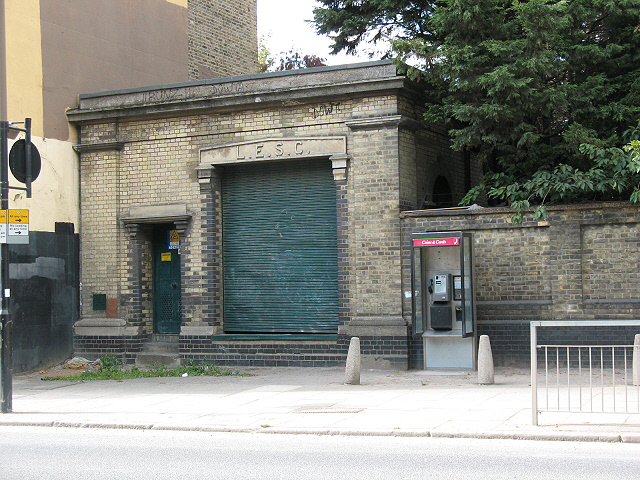
A London Electricity Supply Corporation sub-station in Greenwich High Road 2009

Three distinct coal-fired power stations were built at Deptford on the south bank of the River Thames, the first of which is regarded as the first central high-voltage power station in the world. The stations reached peak output in the 1950s, but then declined, finally closing in 1972.

== History ==
=== Deptford East (Low Pressure) ===
One of the first premises in London to be supplied with electricity was the Grosvenor Gallery in Bond Street. It was the brainchild of the Earl of Crawford, who had been inspired in 1881 by the International Exposition of Electricity in Paris. A power plant was duly built at the Grosvenor Gallery. It was designed to supply just lighting for the gallery but it was soon extended to supply nearby shops and residences and a larger power plant was opened in 1884. With the prospect of expanding still further, the London Electric Supply Corporation was formed (LESCo) in 1887. Principal shareholders were the Earl of Crawford, his friend Sir Coutts Lindsay and Sir Coutts’ brother, Lord Wantage.

There were environmental objections to large-scale power generation in Central London, so LESCo decided to move to a new site in Deptford and to use the Grosvenor Gallery site as a substation. A feature of the Grosvenor scheme was its use of alternating current (AC) in preference to direct current (DC). The use of AC allowed the voltage to be raised to 10 kV for transmission between Deptford and Grosvenor Gallery. High-voltage cables were laid alongside the London and Greenwich Railway line, but cable design at that time was rudimentary, having short lengths and many joints. This caused a voltage drop of some 10% from end to end. In order to supply at 10 kV at Grosvenor Gallery substation, the design voltage at Deptford had to be set at 11 kV, which is why national transmission voltages became standardised in multiples of eleven.

Sebastian de Ferranti was appointed to engineer the scheme, and the world's first central power station opened at Deptford in 1889. ‘Central’ means that it was remote from most of its consumers. To distinguish it from later adjacent developments, Ferranti's power station subsequently took the name Deptford East LP. It was pioneering not just because it was "central" but because of its unprecedented scale and high voltage. It was built on a 3-acre warehouse site called The Stowage which once belonged to the East India Company and was later used by the General Steam Navigation Company.

The first generating machinery to be installed at Deptford was that which had served at the Grosvenor Gallery station. The alternators were of the Ferranti type, the first being driven by belts from three Marshall engines of 250 H.P., 250 H.P., and 400 H.P. respectively. The engines could be connected by clutches as the load required, all three engines being clutched in to drive the alternator at full load. The other generator was driven by ropes from a 750 H.P. Corliss engine, built by Hick, Hargreaves and Co. The generators were at that time the largest in the country. They had armatures 8ft. 6in. diameter, running at 250 revolutions per minute and produced single-phase current at 2500 volts, this pressure being increased to 10,000 volts for transmission by step-up transformers.

In 1889 two 10,000 Volt Ferranti alternators driven by two 1500 hp Hick, Hargreaves reciprocating steam engines were installed, supplied by 24 boilers burning coal brought by collier from Newcastle.

These were followed by two 10,000 HP engines of enormous size for the time but they were never formally commissioned. There were teething problems both at the power station and at the Grosvenor Gallery substation, resulting in lengthy shutdowns and loss of customers. Ferranti himself was sacked in 1891 and succeeded by G. W. Partridge as chief engineer. The plant was rebuilt with two Parsons turbines driving Siemens 7,500 kW alternators and other improvements, and electricity supply eventually became reliable. Demand increased steadily and by 1912 plant of 16,000kW capacity was installed supplying customers through three different systems as follows:

- Domestic and commercial customers at 83.33-cycle single-phase AC.
- Industrial and other customers with three-wire DC and a choice of two voltages.
- Trams, railways and other customers at 25-cycle single-phase AC.

In 1923 the AC plant comprised: 1 × 700 kW, 2 × 1,000 kW, 1 × 1,200 kW, 1 × 1,400 and 5 × 2,000 kW reciprocating engine driven generators; there were 2 × 3,500 kW, 2 × 7,500 and 1 × 15,000 kW turbo-alternators. The DC supply was generated by a single 200 kW reciprocating engine and generator. The total installed capacity was 52.5 MW. The boiler plant produced a total of 490,000 lb/hr (61.73 kg/s) of steam. In 1923 the station generated 53.007 GWh of electricity, some of this was used in the plant, the total amount sold was 46.044 GWh. The revenue from sales of current was £362,133, this gave a surplus of revenue over expenses of £143,574.

By 1929 installed capacity had reached 100MW and the plant comprised three turbo-alternators of 4,000 KW and one of 7,500 kW capacity, generating at 2500 volts to supply 83 cycle/second load; two machines of 8,750 kW and 15,000 kW respectively to supply industrial load at 6,600 Volts 3 phase, 25 cycles/sec; and for the Southern Railway service there are three 20,000 kW sets, generating three-phase 25 cycles/sec at 11,000 volts.

When Britain eventually standardised to 50-cycle three-phase AC, Deptford East LP was downsized to just a few 25-cycle turbine-generators. To feed the 50-cycle National Grid from the LP station, a frequency converter was installed in Deptford West. This motor-generator was commonly known as The Freak. Deptford East LP closed in the late 1960s.

=== Deptford West ===
In 1925, ten electricity supply companies, LESCo among them, amalgamated to become the London Power Company (LPC). Deptford West was conceived by LESCo but was built by LPC and was engineered by Leonard Pearce. The turbine house basement was built in a former dry dock. Initially in 1929 the station had four turbine alternators, two rated at 27,500 kW and two at 35,000 kW each, a bank of coal-fired boilers (Eight Babcock and Wilcox 90,000 Ib/hr and four of Stirling 130,000 lb/hr ) and a single large concrete chimney at the northern end. In 1931 an additional 35,000 kW turbo alternator and four more 160,000 Ib/hr boilers were under construction. Four additional turbine-generations were added in the late 1930s together with three house sets, additional boilers and a second chimney. Staff claimed that the basement of No. 2 turbine-generator was haunted by the ghosts of those who had died on the gibbets alongside the dry dock. This may have been on the site one of the original dry docks founded by Henry VIII for the Royal Navy. Deptford West closed in 1972.

The electricity output from Deptford West power station was as follows.

Deptford West annual electricity output GWh

=== Deptford East (High Pressure) ===
When the electricity industry was nationalised in 1948, power generation came under the auspices of the British Electricity Authority. Deptford East HP opened in 1953 with three 52.5 MW turbine-generators, a range of coal-fired boilers (2 × 225,000 lb/hr (28.3 kg/s) and 5 × 250,000 lb/hr (31.5 kg/s); delivering at 950 psi and 925 °F (496 °C)) and a single chimney. The original plan had been to demolish the LP station to make way for an extension of the HP station, doubling its size. This was never realised because the rapid rate of rise of electricity demand needed much larger power plants than could be accommodated at Deptford. The HP station closed in 1983 under the auspices of the CEGB.

The electricity output from Deptford East power station was as follows.

Deptford East annual electricity output GWh

=== Deptford site as a whole ===
The Deptford site was targeted in both World Wars. In 1916, a Zeppelin dropped a 250 lb bomb, killing one man and putting the entire traction and industrial switchboard out of action, but lighting supplies were restored within 12 minutes, and traction supplies were restored within 24 hours. During World War II, 27 Deptford staff were killed by bombs. The most extensive damage was caused by a bomb on the West switch house. The site as a whole was redeveloped during the 1990s with luxury apartments and a slipway for dinghies. The coaling jetty in the Thames survives. Also surviving are some walls of the west boiler house, which have been incorporated into the apartment structure. A nearby park was developed from a derelict site and was named Ferranti Park as a tribute to one of the great industrial pioneers.

A summary of all the turbine-generator ratings in the mid-1960s:

| Site | Generators |
|---|---|
| Deptford East LP | 70 MW approx from 3 × 20 MW British Thomson-Houston-Brown Boveri, 1 × 25 MW British Thomson-Houston, 1 × 25 MW Richardson-Westgarth-BT-H turbo-alternators |
| Deptford West | 212 MW (2 x 30 MW British Thomson-Houston + 3 x 35 MW Metropolitan Vickers + 1 x 50 MW Metropoliyan Vickers + 7 MW from three house sets) |
| Deptford East HP | 166 MW (3 x 55.5 MW Metro-Vickers turbo-alternators) |
| Deptford Site Total | 448 MW |

This compares with 4,000 MW at Drax and 3,200 MW at Hinkley Point C. Although Deptford was small by modern standards, its contribution to the war effort and to the post-war recovery period was invaluable.

A summary of the boiler capacities and steam conditions.

Boiler capacity and steam conditions
| Site | Boilers (No. and manufacturer) | Boiler capacity (steam flow) | Steam condition (at turbine stop valves) |
|---|---|---|---|
| Deptford East LP | 10 Stirling | 2,245,000 lb/hr (282.9 kg/s) | 300 psi (20.7 bar), 357 °C |
| Deptford East HP | 2 Babcock and Wilcox 5 Foster Wheeler | 2,245,000 lb/hr (282.9 kg/s) | 900 psi (62.1 bar), 482 °C |
| Deptford West | 4 Babcock and Wilcox 4 Stirling 2 Babcock and Wilcox 2 Thompson 1 Thompson La Mont Steam Generator | 2,486,000 lb/hr (313.2 kg/s) | 350 psi (24.1 bar), 399 °C |

=== Coal supply ===
Coal was brought by sea from North East England or South Wales. The LPC and its nationalised successors had its own fleet of coastal colliers for this service, such as the 2,268 GRT SS Francis Fladgate built in 1933 and 2,904 GRT SS Oliver Bury built in 1945.

| Preceded by Forth Banks Power Station | Largest Power Station in the UK; 1891–1901 | Succeeded by Neptune Bank Power Station |
