= Newbury power station =

Former power station in England

- Country: England
- Location: Newbury Berkshire
- Coordinates: 51°24′07″N 01°18′53″W
- Status: Decommissioned and demolished
- Commission date: 1905
- Decommission date: 1970
- Owners: Urban Electric Supply Company (1901–1937); Wessex Electricity Company (1937–1948); British Electricity Authority (1948–1955); Central Electricity Authority (1955–1957); Central Electricity Generating Board (1958–1970)
- Operator: As owner

Thermal power station
- Primary fuel: Diesel fuel
- Turbine technology: Diesel engines

Power generation
- Units operational: 2 x 1050 kW, 2 x 180 kW, 1 x 110 kW
- Nameplate capacity: 2.57 MW
- Annual net output: 1762 MWh (1956)

Newbury power station supplied electricity to the town of Newbury, Berkshire and the surrounding area from 1905 to 1970. It was owned and operated by a succession of public and private organisations. It comprised, at various times, hydro-electric, gas engine and diesel engine powered plant with a maximum output capacity of 2.57 MW.

== History ==
The Board of Trade granted Newbury Corporation a Provisional Order in 1892 to generate and supply electricity to Newbury under the Electric Lighting Acts. The Newbury Electric Lighting Order 1892 was confirmed by Parliament through the Electric Lighting Orders Confirmation (No. 3) Act 1892 (55 & 56 Vict. c. xxxviii). However, the town council did not develop the electricity undertaking.

In 1901 the Urban Electric Supply Company obtained a provisional order to supply electricity to Newbury. The Urban Electric Supply Company was founded in 1898 to obtain parliamentary powers to operate smaller electric light and tramway undertakings. The Newbury Electric Lighting Order 1901 was confirmed by the Electric Lighting Orders Confirmation (No. 7) Act 1901 (1 Edw. 7. c. clxxiv).

The Urban Electric Supply Company built the power station at Greenham Mill (51°24′07″N 1°18′53″W) over the River Kennet and which opened in January 1905. It used water wheels to generate electricity; the maximum head of water over Greenham weir was 6 feet 11 inches (2.11 metres). In addition to the hydro-electric plant, gas-fired generators were installed at the power station.

Electricity was sold to customers in 1923 at 9.57 d./kWh for lighting and domestic use, and 3.26 d./kWh for power uses. The financial operating summary for the undertaking was as follows:

Newbury electricity undertaking financial summary 1922–23
Year	1922	1923
Expenditure charged to capital account	£72,204	£71,992
Revenue from sale of current	£11,106	£12,293
Total revenue from working	£11,850	£13,040
Total working costs	£6,114	£6,250
Surplus of revenue over expenses	£5,488	£6,556
Gross surplus	£5,564	£6,664

In 1937 the Wessex Electricity Company assumed ownership of several small municipal and company electricity undertakings, including Newbury. The Wessex company was founded in 1927 to distribute electricity across south-west England. It aimed to modernise, rationalise and integrate the distribution networks of its constituent companies. Its share capital was wholly owned by Edmundsons Electricity Corporation.

The water wheels and gas engines were decommissioned and replaced with diesel engine sets.

The British electricity supply industry was nationalised in 1948 under the provisions of the Electricity Act 1947 (10 & 11 Geo. 6. c. 54). The Newbury electricity undertaking was abolished, ownership of Newbury power station was vested in the British Electricity Authority, and subsequently the Central Electricity Authority and the Central Electricity Generating Board (CEGB). At the same time the electricity distribution and sales responsibilities of the Newbury electricity undertaking were transferred to the Southern Electricity Board (SEB).

Newbury power station closed in about 1970.

== Plant equipment ==
=== Plant in 1923 ===
The generating plant at Newbury in 1923 comprised:

- 1 × 52 kW water wheel, and direct current generator
- 1 × 60 kW water wheel, DC generator
- 2 × 80 kW gas engines, DC generator
- 2 × 200 kW gas engines, DC generator

This gave a total output of 672 kW.

Electricity was provided to customers at 480 and 240 Volts direct current.

=== Plant in 1955 ===
The generating plant at Newbury in 1955 comprised:

- 1 × 110 kW diesel engine set DC 500 volts
- 2 × 180 kW diesel engine set DC 500 volts
- 1 × 1050 kW Ruston-Peebles diesel engine set 11 kV (installed December 1954)
- 1 × 1050 kW Ruston-Peebles diesel engine set 11 kV (installed January 1955)

The total generating capacity was 2.57 MW.

== Operations ==
=== Operations 1921-23 ===
Electricity supply data for 1921-23 was:

Newbury power station electricity supply data 1921–23
Electricity Use	Units	Year		
Electricity Use	Units	1921	1922	1923
Lighting and domestic	MWh	183	165	186
Public lighting	MWh	0	0	0
Power	MWh	409	363	360
Bulk supply	MWh	0	0	0
Total use	MWh	592	528	546

Electricity Loads on the system were:

Year		1921	1922	1923
Maximum load	kW	300	298	348
Total connections	kW	1593	1664	1746
Load factor	Per cent	25.9	25.0	22.2

=== Operations 1946-67 ===
The operating data for Newbury power station was:

Newbury power station operating data, 1946–67
Year	Running hours or load factor (per cent)	Max output capacity kW	Electricity supplied MWh	Thermal efficiency per cent
1946	–	–	187	–
1954	725	520	227	60.2
1955	467	2620	760	62.1
1956	954	2620	1762	70.5
1957	312	2570	547	68.2
1958	564	2570	1055	72.8
1961	2.6%	3000	584	31.99
1962	3.1%	3000	695	32.17
1963	5.10%	2000	1339	32.40
1967	14.7%	3880	4940	31.74

== See also ==
- Timeline of the UK electricity supply industry
- List of power stations in England
