= Lymington power station =

Former coal-fired power station in Hampshire, England

- Country: England
- Location: Lymington Hampshire
- Coordinates: 50°45′27″N 01°32′04″W
- Status: Decommissioned and demolished
- Commission date: 1899
- Decommission date: 31 March 1959
- Owners: Lymington Electric Light and Power Company Limited (1894–1927); Wessex Electricity Company (1927–1948); British Electricity Authority (1948–1955); Central Electricity Authority (1955–1957); Central Electricity Generating Board (1958–1959)
- Operator: As owner

Thermal power station
- Primary fuel: Coal, fuel oil
- Turbine technology: steam engines, oil engines

Power generation
- Units operational: 2 x 750 kW steam (1923), 490 kW oil engines (1959)
- Nameplate capacity: 1500 kW (1923), 490 kW (1959)
- Annual net output: 178 MWh (1923)

Lymington power station supplied electricity to the town of Lymington, Hampshire and the surrounding area from 1899 to 1959. The electricity generating station was owned and operated by a succession of electricity companies prior to nationalisation of the British electricity supply industry in 1948. The station was initially coal-fired but later oil engines were installed. Lymington power station was closed on 31 March 1959.

== History ==
In 1894 Lymington Electric Light and Power Company Limited obtained a provisional order under the Electric Lighting Acts to generate and supply electricity to Lymington. The Lymington Electric Lighting Order 1899 was confirmed by Parliament in the Electric Lighting Orders Confirmation (No. 14) Act 1899 (62 & 63 Vict. c. cxxxix). The company built a power station at Bath Road, Lymington (50°45′27″N 1°32′04″W) which first supplied electricity to the town in 1899. The company owned and operated the power station and electricity supply system.

The Wessex Electricity Company was formed on 29 July 1927 with the aim to develop an integrated power supply system over a large area of southern England. The Wessex company took over several company and municipal electricity undertakings including the power stations at Amesbury, Andover, Chipping Norton, Downton, Frome, Lymington, Newbury and Yeovil. The company aimed to modernise, rationalise and integrate the distribution networks of its constituent companies. At Lymington the coal-fired plant was decommissioned and oil fuelled internal combustion engines were installed. In 1939 the share capital of the Wessex company was wholly owned by Edmundsons Electricity Corporation. In June 1939 the Wessex company raised capital by the sale of £1.5 million of debenture stock.

Upon nationalisation of the electricity supply industry in 1948 the Wessex company was abolished, ownership of Lymington power station was vested in the British Electricity Authority, and subsequently the Central Electricity Authority and the Central Electricity Generating Board (CEGB). At the same time the electricity distribution and sales responsibilities of the Wessex electricity undertaking were transferred to the Southern Electricity Board (SEB).

The power station continued to operate for a decade after nationalisation until it was closed by the CEGB on 31 March 1959, and was subsequently demolished. The site has been redeveloped with commercial premises.

== Technical specifications ==
In 1923 the generating plant comprised:

- Coal-fired boilers supplying 12,000 lb/h (1.51 kg/s) of steam to:
- 2 × 750 kW reciprocating engines and direct current generator sets

Electricity was available to consumers at 480 and 240 Volts DC.

The end use of electricity over the period 1921–23 was:

Lymington electricity use 1921–23
| Electricity Use | Units | Year | | |
| Electricity Use | Units | 1921 | 1922 | 1923 |
|---|---|---|---|---|
| Lighting and domestic | MWh | 78 | 77 | 86 |
| Public lighting | MWh | 10 | 9 | 9 |
| Traction | MWh | 0 | 0 | 0 |
| Power | MWh | 86 | 61 | 81 |
| Bulk supply | MWh | 0 | 0 | 0 |
| Total use | MWh | 174 | 148 | 178 |

The operating parameters of the electricity system were:

Lymington electricity system 1921–23
| Operating | Units | Year | | |
| Operating | Units | 1921 | 1922 | 1923 |
|---|---|---|---|---|
| Maximum load | kW | 122 | 125 | 128 |
| Total connections | kW | 964 | 969 | 949 |
| Load factor | Per cent | 20.9 | 17.8 | 20.2 |

Revenue from sales of current was £5,391 (1922) and £6,116 (1923). The surplus of revenue over expenses £2,864 (1922) and £3,445 (1923).

By 1957 the steam plant had been decommissioned and the generating plant comprised diesel sets: 1 × 90 kW and 2 × 200 kW giving an output of 0.485 MW.

The electricity output and operating data in the final years was:

Lymington electricity output and operating data
| Year | Running hours | Maximum output capacity kW | Electricity supplied MWh | Thermal efficiency per cent |
|---|---|---|---|---|
| 1946 | – | 518 (max load supplied) | 124 | – |
| 1954 | 521 | 530 | 231 | 83.7 |
| 1955 | 557 | 530 | 248 | 84.0 |
| 1956 | 588 | 530 | 285 | 91.5 |
| 1957 | 126 | 490 | 61 | 98.8 |
| 1958 | 144 | 490 | 62 | 87.9 |

== See also ==
- Timeline of the UK electricity supply industry
- List of power stations in England
