= Wessex Electricity Company =

Former British generation and supply company

- Company type: Public limited company
- Industry: Energy, Electricity
- Founded: 29 July 1927
- Defunct: 31 March 1948
- Fate: Abolished by nationalisation
- Successor: British Electricity Authority
- Headquarters: London
- Area served: South and south-west England
- Key people: See text
- Services: Electricity generation, distribution and supply

The Wessex Electricity Company was an electricity generating and supply organisation that operated in south and south-west England from its establishment in 1927 until it was dissolved as a consequence of the nationalisation of the British electricity supply industry in 1948.

== History ==
Wessex Electricity Act 1927
- Act of Parliament
- Parliament of the United Kingdom
- Long title: An Act for incorporating and conferring powers on the Wessex Electricity Company and for other purposes.
- Citation: 17 & 18 Geo. 5. c. lxxii

Dates
- Royal assent: 29 July 1927

Text of statute as originally enacted

Wessex Electricity Act 1928
- Act of Parliament
- Parliament of the United Kingdom
- Long title: An Act to extend the limits of supply and increase the capital of the Wessex Electricity Company and for other purposes.
- Citation: 18 & 19 Geo. 5. c. xc

Dates
- Royal assent: 3 August 1928

Text of statute as originally enacted

Wessex Electricity Act 1937
- Act of Parliament
- Parliament of the United Kingdom
- Long title: An Act to confer further powers on the Wessex Electricity Company and for other purposes.
- Citation: 1 Edw. 8 & 1 Geo. 6. c. lxviii

Dates
- Royal assent: 6 July 1937

Text of statute as originally enacted

Wessex Electricity Act 1940
- Act of Parliament
- Parliament of the United Kingdom
- Long title: An Act to confer further powers on the Wessex Electricity Company and for other purposes.
- Citation: 3 & 4 Geo. 6. c. xii

Dates
- Royal assent: 22 May 1940

Text of statute as originally enacted

The Wessex Electricity Company was formed as a subsidiary of the Edmundsons Electricity Corporation on 29 July 1927. Its aim was to develop an integrated power supply system over a large area of southern England. The legal powers of the company were initially derived from the Wessex Electricity Act 1927 (17 & 18 Geo. 5. c. lxxii). Further powers were obtained by three further local acts of Parliament: the Wessex Electricity Act 1928 (18 & 19 Geo. 5. c. xc), the Wessex Electricity Act 1937 (1 Edw. 8 & 1 Geo. 6. c. lxviii), and the Wessex Electricity Act 1940 (3 & 4 Geo. 6. c. xii).

=== Constituent electricity undertakings ===
The Wessex company assumed ownership of several small municipal and company electricity undertakings. It aimed to modernise, rationalise and integrate the distribution networks of these constituent companies. The company owned, at various times, the following electricity undertakings; the undertaking supply area is given where this is not apparent from the title:

- Abingdon Electric Supply Company Limited
- Chipping Norton Electric Supply Company Limited
- Cirencester Electric Supply Company Limited
- Cookham and District Electricity Corporation Limited
- Crompton and Company Limited, Andover undertaking
- Downton near Salisbury, generating station
- Edmundsons Electricity Corporation, Frome undertaking
- Lymington Electric Light and Power Company Limited
- Oxford Electric Company Limited
- Petters Limited, Yeovil undertaking
- Thames Valley Electric Supply Company Limited
- Tisbury Electric Supply Company Limited
- Urban Electric Supply Company Limited, Newbury undertaking
- Wantage Electric Supply Company Limited
- West Wiltshire Electric Light and Power Company Limited

Oxford Council exercised its rights in 1931 to purchase the Oxford undertaking and was able to reduce tariffs. However, this created an independent electricity 'island' within the Wessex supply area. In 1938 the shareholders of the Oxford Electricity Company recommended the sale of the company to the Wessex Electricity Company.

=== Supply area ===
By 1937 the company was distributing electricity over a mainly rural area of 3,826 square miles (9,909 km^{2}) encompassing a population of 750,000. It served most of Wiltshire, Oxfordshire and Berkshire, and parts of Buckinghamshire, Gloucestershire, Hampshire, Somerset and Dorset. The area included several growing centres of population around Andover, Newbury and Oxford. The company had four distribution areas: North Oxfordshire; Mid Wessex; South Wessex No. 1; and South Wessex No. 2. The Wessex system also connected to other power company systems such as the Shropshire, Worcestershire and Staffordshire Electric Power Company.

=== Expansion and investment ===
The expansion of the Wessex company’s business is shown in the increase in the connected electricity load in the late 1930s:

Year	Connected load MW
1934	88.137
1935	107.058
1936	137.151
1937	178.061
1938	231.077

The company profits were £253,222 (1936), £251,881 (1937) and £259,769 (1938). In June 1939 the Wessex company raised capital for future developments by the sale of £1.5 million of debenture stock.

Following the Second World War the Wessex company proposed the expenditure of £3 million to bring electricity to a further 840 villages and hamlets in its supply area.

=== Electricity generation ===
The electricity generating capacity and output of the constituent power stations in 1946 was:

Wessex Electricity Company power stations 1946
Power station	Power source	Electricity generated MWh	Electricity sent out MWh	Thermal efficiency	Maximum load kW	Load factor
Amesbury	Oil engine	136.3	170.1	–	59	32.9 %
Amesbury	Hydro	43.4	170.1	–	59	32.9 %
Andover	Oil engine	29.6	28.5	–	207	–
Chipping Norton	Oil engine	60.1	49.8	–	–	–
Downton	Oil engine	64.9	78.4	–	139	–
Downton	Hydro	19.1	78.4	–	139	–
Frome	Steam	5,543.4	5,186.7	10.00 %	2,738	21.8 %
Lymington	Oil engine	126.0	124.2	–	518	–
Newbury	Oil engine	188.3	187.0	–	515	–
Yeovil	Oil engine	452.0	415.3	–	534	–
Total	–	6,663.1	6,240.0	–	4,710	–

=== Company directors ===
The directors of the company in 1939 were:

- Lord Meston (James Scorgie Meston, 1865 – 1943) (Chairman)
- Wade H. Hayes (Deputy Chairman)
- G. W. Spenser Hawes
- F. H. James
- Sir Thomas Royden (later Lord Royden)
- A. Winterbotttom

The registered office was at Thames House, Millbank, London

== Nationalisation ==
The Wessex Electricity Company was abolished on 31 March 1948 under the terms of the Electricity Act 1947 which nationalised the British electricity supply industry. The company’s power stations and electricity transmission systems were vested in the British Electricity Authority. The local distribution systems and the electricity sales functions were vested in the Southern Electricity Board (SEB). The distribution districts were reformed as Board sub-areas and districts including Oxford, Portsmouth, Salisbury and Swindon Districts.

== See also ==
- List of pre-nationalisation UK electric power companies
- Timeline of the UK electricity supply industry
- List of power stations in England
