= Stourport power stations =

Former power stations in England

- Country: United Kingdom
- Location: Stourport, Worcestershire
- Coordinates: 52°20′01″N 02°16′28″W
- Status: Decommissioned and demolished
- Construction began: 1926, 1949
- Commission date: 1927, 1950
- Decommission date: 1978, 1984
- Owners: Shropshire, Worcestershire and Staffordshire Electric Power Company (1926–1948); British Electricity Authority (1948–1955); Central Electricity Authority (1955–1957); Central Electricity Generating Board (1958–1984)
- Operator: As owner

Thermal power station
- Primary fuel: Coal
- Turbine technology: Steam turbines
- Chimneys: A station 4, B station 2
- Cooling towers: None
- Cooling source: River water

Power generation
- Units operational: (See text)
- Make and model: British Thomson-Houston 35 MW, English Electric 60 MW
- Nameplate capacity: 181 MW, 120 MW
- Annual net output: 1035 GWh (1961)

Stourport power stations were two coal-powered electricity generating stations that supplied electricity to Stourport-on-Severn, Worcestershire and to the wider West Midlands area from 1927 to 1984. The two stations, A (1927–78) and B (1950–84), were collocated on a joint site adjacent to the River Severn south of Stourport-on-Severn.

== Background ==
The Shropshire, Worcestershire and Staffordshire Electric Power Company had been founded in 1903 as the Shropshire and Worcestershire Electric Power Company. The company changed its name and obtained several local acts of Parliament to generate and supply electricity to areas of Shropshire and Worcestershire in the West Midlands. These acts included the Shropshire, Worcestershire and Staffordshire Electric Power Act 1905 (5 Edw. 7. c. clx); Shropshire, Worcestershire and Staffordshire Electric Power Act 1914 (4 & 5 Geo. 5. c. lxxxiv); Shropshire Worcestershire and Staffordshire Electric Power Act 1918 (8 & 9 Geo. 5. c. xliii); and Shropshire, Worcestershire and Staffordshire Electric Power Act 1919 (9 & 10 Geo. 5. c. cxxi). The company built and operated power stations at Dudley, Kidderminster and Smethwick.

In 1916 the Shropshire, Worcestershire and Staffordshire Electric Power Company and Birmingham Corporation developed a scheme to build two large power stations to meet their combined needs for electricity. The new power stations were to be at Nechells with two 15 MW generating sets and at Stourport with three 15 MW generating sets. However, the scheme was not taken forward on financial grounds.

Legal powers were sought to build a power station at Stourport. These powers were obtained under the provisions of the Shropshire, Worcestershire and Staffordshire Electric Power Act 1926 (16 & 17 Geo. 5. c. ciii). The Company built the A power station on a riverside site (52°20′01″N 2°16′28″W) south of the town. The power station was inaugurated by the Prime Minister Stanley Baldwin on 2 June 1927.

=== Stourport and electricity policy ===
Under the terms of the Electricity (Supply) Act 1926 the Central Electricity Board (CEB) was established. The CEB identified high efficiency ‘selected’ power stations that would supply electricity most efficient and effectively; Stourport became a 'selected' station. The CEB also constructed the national grid (1927–33) to connect power stations within a region.

In 1938 the CEB directed the company to install an additional 30 MW of plant at Stourport including boilers in time for commercial operation in 1940.

In 1938 the company obtained a local act of Parliament: the Shropshire, Worcestershire and Staffordshire Electric Power (Consolidation) Act 1938 (1 & 2 Geo. 6. c. lviii). This act consolidated into one volume the numerous acts that the company operated under for many years.

In 1939 the CEB permitted the company to close its older power stations at Smethwick and Hereford. Power lines were installed from Stourport to the site of the Smethwick station to enable Smethwick to be supplied with electricity from Stourport power station.

The British electricity supply industry was nationalised in 1948 under the provisions of the Electricity Act 1947. The Shropshire, Worcestershire and Staffordshire Electric Power Company undertaking was abolished, ownership of Stourport power station was vested in the British Electricity Authority, and subsequently the Central Electricity Authority and the Central Electricity Generating Board (CEGB). At the same time the electricity distribution and sales responsibilities of the company were transferred to the Midlands Electricity Board (MEB).

== Stourport A ==
Stourport A power station was built in stages from 1926 to 1944, the latter under the direction of the CEB. It was initially known as Stourport power station and became Stourport A when the new station, Stourport B, was built in 1950.

=== Specification ===
The A station had a low pressure steam side and a high pressure side and comprised:

- Coal-fired boilers:
  - Low pressure
    - 4 × 50,000 lb/h (6.3 kg/s) Stirling boilers, 350 psi at 686 °F (24.1 bar at 363 °C)
    - 2 × 90,000 lb/h (11.33 kg/s) Stirling boilers, 350 psi at 686 °F (24.1 bar at 363 °C)
    - 2 × 100,000 lb/h (12.60 kg/s) Stirling boilers, 350 psi at 686 °F (24.1 bar at 363 °C)
  - High pressure
    - 8 × 160,000 lb/h (20.16 kg/s) Stirling boilers, 650 psi at 850° (44.83 bar at 454 °C)
- Generating plant:
  - Low pressure
    - 2 × 18 MW British Thomson-Houston turbo-alternators (AC) each with a 250 kW DC auxiliary generator
    - 1 × 20 MW British Thomson-Houston turbo-alternator
  - High pressure
    - 1 × 35 MW British Thomson-Houston turbo-alternator
    - 3 × 30 MW English Electric turbo-alternators
  - House set
    - 1 × 750 kW DC British Thomson-Houston turbo-alternator
- The main sets generated current at 33 kV and 11 kV.

Coal was delivered to the station by barge from the River Severn and by railway along a specially constructed branch from the Severn Valley Railway line to an extensive coal store north of the station buildings. Cooling water for the condensers was drawn from the River Severn.

=== Operational data ===
Operating details of the A station was as follows:

Operation of Stourport A low pressure station
Year	Maximum output capacity MW	Running hours	Electricity supplied, GWh	Thermal efficiency, %
1954	54	3302	63.624	13.60
1955	54	3156	70.105	12.08
1956	54	2026	34.965	10.08
1957	54	1278	26.491	11.01
1958	54	194	2.452	5.63

The decline in use (the reduced running hours) in the mid-1950s is evident; the thermal efficiency is also low.

Operating details of the A station high pressure plant are as follows:

Operation of Stourport A high pressure station
Year	Maximum output capacity MW	Running hours (or load factor %)	Electricity supplied, GWh	Thermal efficiency, %
1954	119	5999	347.732	22.71
1955	119	5931	377.883	22.99
1956	119	6301	380.990	22.27
1957	119	5197	273.089	21.76
1958	119	4976	306.457	20.97
High pressure and low pressure combined
1946		(45.8 %)	714.525	22.34
1961	173	(24.9 %)	376.918	20.54
1962	173	(19.8 %)	300.420	20.33
1963	173	(19.78 %)	299.798	19.80
1967	168	(26.9 %)	408.0	20.50
1972	119	(16.8 %)	175.833	18.52

In 1963 and 1972 the only operational turbo-alternator sets were the HP 1 × 35 MW and 3 × 30 MW.

In November 1952 one man was killed and one seriously injured at Stourport power station when they fell 100 feet from a hoist inside a chimney.

In 1959 experimental heat pumps were installed at Stourport and Meaford power stations to heat the administrative buildings.

Stourport A power station closed on 30 October 1978 when its generating capacity had fallen to 57 MW.

== Stourport B ==
Stourport B power station was built by the British Electricity Authority and was commissioned in two stages from 1950 to 1954.

=== Specification ===
The B station comprised the following plant:

Two ‘Unit’ boilers:

- 1 × Stirling, two drum, pulverised coal-fired boiler, evaporative capacity 525,000 lb/h (66.15 kg/s), steam conditions 1,275 psi at 975 °F (87.93 bar at 524 °C) (No. 1 LP unit). The furnace of this boiler was a slag-tap type, the first use of this type in the UK.
- 1 × International Combustion, two drum, pulverised coal-fired boiler, evaporative capacity 515,000 lb/h (64.89 kg/s), steam conditions 1,550 psi at 1060 °F (106.9 bar at 571 °C) (No. 2 unit).

Generators:

- 2 × 60 MW English Electric hydrogen cooled turbo-alternators. Three cylinder double-flow type. No. 1 (LP unit) and No. 2 HP Unit. Both generated current at 11 kV. The No. 2 generator, commissioned in 1954, had the most advanced steam conditions of any turbine on the United Kingdom public supply system: 1500 psi at 1050 °F (103.4 bar at 566 °C) at the turbine stop valve. The first unit was commissioned in July 1950.

The voltage was stepped up to 33 kV and 66 kV.

Cooling water for the condensers was drawn from the river.

=== Operational data ===
Operating details of the B station was as follows:

Operation of Stourport B low pressure station
Year	Maximum output capacity MW	Running hours	Electricity supplied, GWh	Thermal efficiency, %
1954	56	7366	407.747	30.53
1955	56	8048	462.310	30.83
1956	56	5212	293.768	30.29
1957	56	7400	390.776	29.75
1958	56	5290	280.805	29.95
1960	56	80 % (load factor)	393.521	29.48

In 1959/60 Stourport B L.P. was one of the CEGB's 20 steam power stations with the highest thermal efficiency.

The combined output from the low and high pressure plant is given below:

Operation of Stourport B high pressure station
Year	Maximum output capacity MW	Running hours (or load factor %)	Electricity supplied, GWh	Thermal efficiency, %
1955	56	602	18.692	25.23
1956	56	5603	299.136	30.34
1957	56	4214	224.931	30.07
1958	56	6796	360.770	30.16
1960	56	(63 %)	308.381	29.87
High pressure and low pressure combined
1961	112	(67.1 %)	658.481	29.77
1962	112	(63.6 %)	624.329	29.39
1963	112	(66.87 %)	656.144	29.16
1967	112	(65.9 %)	648.35	28.92
1972	112	(38.4 %)	377.537	27.03
1979	112	(31.3 %)	307.558	26.80
1981	112	(40.1 %)	393.174	27.65
1982	112	(23.7 %)	232.076	27.20

In 1959/60 Stourport B H.P. was one of the CEGB's 20 steam power stations with the highest thermal efficiency.

The decline in use (the load factor) in the 1970s is evident.

Overall output of the station (A & B) in GWh

Stourport B power station was closed in 1984 and was subsequently demolished. The area is now a housing estate. One of the roads is named Power Station Road.

== See also ==
- Timeline of the UK electricity supply industry
- List of power stations in England
