= North Metropolitan Electric Power Supply Company =

- Company type: Public company
- Industry: Electricity supply
- Founded: 1900
- Defunct: 31 March 1948
- Fate: Nationalisation
- Successor: British Electricity Authority, Eastern Electricity Board
- Headquarters: London, United Kingdom
- Area served: North London, parts of Essex and Hertfordshire
- Products: Electricity

The North Metropolitan Electric Power Supply Company (Northmet) provided electricity to the northern suburbs of London and to parts of Hertfordshire and Essex. Supplies of electricity commenced in 1907 and continued until the company was abolished in 1948 when the British electricity supply industry was nationalized.

== Background ==
North Metropolitan Electric Power Supply Act 1900
- Act of Parliament
- Parliament of the United Kingdom
- Long title: An Act for incorporating and conferring powers upon the North Metropolitan Electric Power Supply Company and for other purposes.
- Citation: 63 & 64 Vict. c. cclxxvi

Dates
- Royal assent: 6 August 1900

Other legislation
- Repealed by: North Metropolitan Electric Power Supply (Consolidation) Act 1928

Status: Repealed

The North Metropolitan Electric Power Supply Company was established in 1900 under the provisions of the North Metropolitan Electric Power Supply Act 1900 (63 & 64 Vict. c. cclxxvi). The act empowered the company to construct a power station at Enfield (Brimsdown) and to supply electricity to the boroughs and towns of: Hendon, Barnet, Edmonton, Ware, Hertford, Hatfield, Welwyn, St. Albans, Chingford and Walthamstow. This encompassed an area of 325 square miles. Further Acts of 1902, 1903, 1905, 1907 and 1909 extended the area of supply and permitted the company to purchase the power station at Willesden (Taylors Lane). Electric current was first supplied to Edmonton on 1 July 1907.

=== Directors ===
The directors of the company in 1923 were:

- Emile Garcke (chairman)
- William L Magden
- Sir Alexander Roger
- Charles G. Tegetmeier
- Sir James Devonshire (managing director)

=== Associated companies ===
The North Metropolitan Power Station Company Limited owned Brimsdown power station which was operated under lease by the Northmet Power Company.

The North Metropolitan Electrical Power Distribution Company was registered on 19 April 1899. It was formed to supply electricity, which it took from a bulk supply from the North Metropolitan Electric Power Supply Company. Electricity was supplied to Hertford, Barnet, Enfield and St. Albans. The distribution company was vested into the Northmet Electric Power Company in December 1922.

== Operations ==
Before the First World War Northmet was supplying tramway systems, the underground railway as well as several boroughs and towns.

The electricity sold, and the revenue, over the period 1908-12 was as follows.

Electricity sales and revenue 1908-12
Year	Revenue £	Working cost £	Units sold MWh
1908	74,304	43,150	14,069
1909	87,833	44,491	16,402
1910	111,309	50,185	21,422
1911	131,131	60,590	26,454
1912	140,522	71,292	29,231

By 1915 Northmet was operating power stations at Brimsdown, Willesden (Taylors Lane), Hertford and St. Albans. Outline details of these stations is summarised in the table, for full details see articles for individual power stations (See also below).

Northmet power stations 1915
Station	Brimsdown	Willesden	Hertford	St. Albans
Steam lb/hr	130,000	98,250	3 boilers	
Generators	3 × 1 MW 1 × 2 MW 1 × 3 MW 2 × 100 kW 2 × 50 kW	2 × 300 kW 1 × 600 kW 1 × 750 kW 1 × 1 MW 2 × 1.2 MW 1 × 3 MW	3 × 100 kW 1 × 500 kW 1 × 200 kW	4 × 48 kW 4 × 48 kW 2 × 36 kW
Supply	10,500 V 3-phase, 50 Hz	10,500 V 3-phase, 50 Hz 2,750-2,950 V 3-phase 50 Hz	LT and HT	
Cooling		Spray cooling and 5 chimney cooling towers		Klein cooling towers

In the interwar period Northmet developed domestic, commercial and industrial consumers. By 1939 it employed 4,300 staff, had 4,648 miles of mains spread over an area of 671 square miles and served a population of 1.5 million.

The specification of the Northmet generating plant in 1923 is outlined below.

Northmet power stations 1923
Station	Brimsdown	Willesden	Hertford	St. Albans
Steam lb/hr	290,000	248,000	24,000	18,000
Generators	1 × 3 MW 2 × 5 MW (Total 13 MW AC)	3 × 1.5 MW 1 × 3 MW 2 × 6 MW 1 × 0.75 MW DC (Total 19.5 MW AC, 0.75 MW DC)	1 × 0.5 MW 1 × 1.0 MW 1 × 0.1 MW DC (Total 1.5 MW AC, 0.1 MW DC)	2 × 75 kW DC 2 × 150 kW DC 2 × 240 kW DC 1 × 500 kW DC (Total 1.43MW DC)
Supply	3-phase, 50 Hz, 11 & 6.6 kV, 415 & 240 V and DC 460 & 230 V DC		3-phase, 50 Hz, 415 & 240 V AC and 460 & 230V DC	3-phase, 50 Hz 415 & 240 V AC and 460 & 230V DC
Maximum load kW	26,500		630	1,322
Total electricity sold MWh	62,315		838	1,982

A summary of the generating capacity of the Northmet system in 1937 is shown on the following table.

Northmet electricity generation and sales 1937
Station	Brimsdown A	Brimsdown B	Willesden
Steam lb/hr	160,000	120,000	414,000
Generators total	34 MW	107.5 MW	38.5 MW
Maximum load kW	235,980		
Total electricity sold MWh	636,585		

The authorized undertakings supplied by Northmet were Barnet, Bishops Stortford, Edmonton, Enfield, Hertford, Kingsbury, St. Albans, Southgate, Stevenage, Tottenham, Wood Green, Epping Rural, Harrow, and Wealdstone.

Northmet electricity output in the post-war period was as follows.

Northmet electricity sent out 1946-50
MWh	Brimsdown A	Brimsdown B	Willesden
1946	96,643	490,564	223,694
1947	123,754	463,339	185,573
1948	172,286	427,661	282,544
1950	157,207	488,663	201,650

== Abolition ==
The North Metropolitan Electric Power Supply Company was abolished on 31 March 1948 under the provisions of the Electricity Act 1947 which nationalized the British electricity supply industry. The generating plant was vested in the British Electricity Authority and the distribution infrastructure in the Eastern Electricity Board.

Generation of electricity at Willesden (Taylors Lane) and Brimsdown power stations continued until 1972 and 1976 respectively.

== See also ==
- Timeline of the UK electricity supply industry
- List of pre-nationalisation UK electric power companies
- Taylors Lane Power Station
- Brimsdown Power Station
