= Upper Boat power station =

Former coal-fired power station

- Country: Wales
- Location: Pontypridd, Rhondda Cynon Taff
- Coordinates: 51°34′34″N 03°18′07″W
- Status: Decommissioned and demolished
- Construction began: 1900, 1922
- Commission date: 1904, 1924
- Decommission date: 1972
- Owners: South Wales Electrical Power Distribution Company (1922–1948); British Electricity Authority (1948–1955); Central Electricity Authority (1955–1957); Central Electricity Generating Board (1958–1972)
- Operator: As owner

Thermal power station
- Primary fuel: Coal
- Turbine technology: Steam turbines
- Chimneys: Multiple
- Cooling towers: 1
- Cooling source: River water and cooling tower

Power generation
- Units operational: 1 × 18 MW, 1 × 25 MW, 1 × 20 MW, 3 × 30 MW
- Make and model: Parsons and English Electric
- Nameplate capacity: 155 MW
- Annual net output: 816 GWh (1946)

Upper Boat power station supplied electricity to the town of Pontypridd and the wider area from 1904 to 1972. The power station was developed in several stages firstly in 1902, then from 1924 to 1942. It was owned and operated by the South Wales Electrical Power Distribution Company until the nationalisation of the electricity supply industry in 1948. The station was decommissioned in 1972 and was demolished in 1976.

== History ==
South Wales Electrical Power Distribution Company Act 1900
- Act of Parliament
- Parliament of the United Kingdom
- Long title: An Act for incorporating and conferring powers on the South Wales Electrical Power Distribution Company.
- Citation: 63 & 64 Vict. c. cclxxxii

Dates
- Royal assent: 6 August 1900

South Wales Electrical Power Distribution Company Act 1920
- Act of Parliament
- Parliament of the United Kingdom
- Long title: An Act to make further provision in regard to the undertaking of the South Wales Electrical Power Distribution Distribution Company.
- Citation: 10 & 11 Geo. 5. c. vi

Dates
- Royal assent: 20 May 1920

South Wales Electrical Power Distribution Company Act 1922
- Act of Parliament
- Parliament of the United Kingdom
- Long title: An Act to make further provision in regard to the undertaking of the South Wales Electrical Power Distribution Company.
- Citation: 12 & 13 Geo. 5. c. lxvii

Dates
- Royal assent: 20 July 1922

Text of statute as originally enacted

Upper Boat power station was built by the South Wales Electrical Power Distribution Company from 1902. The company was established by Parliament through the South Wales Electrical Power Distribution Company Act 1900 (63 & 64 Vict. c. cclxxxii). The legal authority to undertake redevelopment was given by local acts of Parliament: the South Wales Electrical Power Distribution Company Act 1920 (10 & 11 Geo. 5. c. vi) and the South Wales Electrical Power Distribution Company Act 1922 (12 & 13 Geo. 5. c. lxvii). The company also owned and operated Llynfi power station and generating stations at Abercarn, Caerphilly, Cowbridge, Llantwit Fardre, Panteg, and St. Mellons.

The power station at Upper Boat (51°34′34″N 3°18′07″W) was adjacent to the Great Western Railway and the generating station had sidings for the delivery of coal. The site was also adjacent to the River Taff which provided water for cooling.

The foundation stone was laid on 30 April 1902. Electricity was first generated in 1904.

== Equipment specification ==
The new (1924-42) plant at Upper Boat power station was installed in several phases:

- 18 MW (low pressure) in 1924,
- 20 MW (low pressure) in 1925,
- 25 MW (low pressure) in 1929,
- 3 × 30 MW (high pressure) in 1939, 1940 and 1942

The plant comprised:

- Boilers:
  - 8 × Babcock and Wilcox 60,000 lb/h (7.56 kg/s) stoker fired boilers operating at 350 psi and 650/750°F (24.1 bar and 343/399 °C),
  - 4 × Babcock and Wilcox 182,000 lb/h (22.93 kg/s) pulverised fuel boilers operating at 650 psi and 850°F (44.8 bar and 454°C),
  - 1 × Babcock and Wilcox 364,000 lb/h (45.86 kg/s) pulverised fuel boiler operating at 650 psi and 850°F (44.8 bar and 454°C),
  - 1 × Mitchell 182,000 lb/h (22.93 kg/s) chain grate/ pulverised fuel boiler operating at 650 psi and 850°F (44.8 bar and 454°C),

The total evaporative capacity of the boilers was 1,754,000 lb/h (221 kg/s).

- Coaling equipment:
  - Pulverising mills, 'Lopulco' 13.5 tons/h on 2 boilers, 27 tons/h on 1 boiler, Babcock & Wilcox ‘E’ type 10.8 tons/h on 2 boilers, 'Atritor' 5.4 tons/h on 1 boiler.
- Generating sets:
  - 1 × 18 MW Parsons, Mirrlees-Watson condenser,
  - 1 × 25 MW Parsons,
  - 1 × 20 MW English Electric, Hick-Hargreaves condenser,
  - 3 × 30 MW English Electric, 1 generating at 11 kV, 2 at 33 kV, the first machine was the two-cylinder impulse-reaction type, with double-flow exhaust, 3,000 rpm.
  - 2 × 1 MW Allen-GEC auxiliary sets, 400 V.

The total installed generating capacity was 155 MW, and the output capacity was 144 MW.

Condensing water was taken from River Taff at 6.42 million gallons per hour (8.11 m^{3}/s); there was 1 Film reinforced concrete cooling tower with a capacity of 2.25 million gallons per hour (2.84 m^{3}/s).

There was a 132 kV substation south east of the power station that provided the electricity connection to the national grid. Later a 275 kV substation was built south of the power station.

== Operations ==
By 1923 the station had a generating capacity of 14 MW, and sold 49 GWh of electricity.

Soon after the commissioning of the new plant at Upper Boat power station the Electricity (Supply) Act 1926 (16 & 17 Geo. 5. c. 51) was enacted. This established the Central Electricity Board (CEB) with a duty to identify high efficiency ‘selected’ power stations that would supply electricity most effectively; Upper Boat was designated a selected station. The CEB also constructed the national grid (1927–33) to connect power stations within a region.

From about 1937 steam from the station was used to provide process and space heating to the nearby Treforest trading estate.

The British electricity supply industry was nationalised in 1948 under the provisions of the Electricity Act 1947 (10 & 11 Geo. 6. c. 54). The South Wales Electrical Power Distribution Company was abolished, ownership of Upper Boat power station was vested in the British Electricity Authority, and subsequently the Central Electricity Authority and the Central Electricity Generating Board (CEGB). At the same time the electricity distribution and sales responsibilities of the South Wales Electrical Power Distribution Company were transferred to the South Wales Electricity Board (SWALEB).

=== Operating data ===
Operating data for the period 1946–72 is shown in the table:

Upper Boat power station operating data, 1946–72
Year	Running hours or load factor (per cent)	Max output capacity MW	Electricity supplied GWh	Thermal efficiency per cent
1946	61.9 %	150.6	816.407	19.81
Low pressure station
1954	8558	59	206.540	13.67
1955	8387	59	150.843	12.62
1956	8191	59	118.167	11.44
1957	8307	59	130.762	12.17
1958	4572	59	68.196	10.23
High pressure station
1954	8577	85	439.935	24.05
1955	8610	85	542.770	23.40
1956	8710	85	499.832	23.52
1957	7663	85	343.261	23.76
1958	7074	85	311.837	23.18
Combined output
1961	12.8 %	144	161.506	18.12
1962	9.8 %	144	123.986	17.88
1963	14.03 %	144	223.004	13.69
1967	17.3 %	127	192.141	18.94
1972	11.6 %	80	77.392	18.19

The less intensive use of the ‘low pressure’ plant between 1954 and 1958 is evident.

== Closure and aftermath ==
Upper Boat power station was decommissioned in 1972. The buildings subsequently demolished in 1976 and the area has been redeveloped with industrial and commercial units. The 132 kV and 275 kV substations are extant (2020).

== See also ==
- Timeline of the UK electricity supply industry
- List of power stations in Wales
