= County of Durham Electrical Power Distribution Company =

Electrical power distributor in England

- Company type: Public company
- Industry: Electricity generation and supply
- Founded: 1900
- Defunct: 1933
- Fate: Take over
- Successor: Newcastle-upon-Tyne Electric Supply Company
- Services: Electricity

The County of Durham Electrical Power Distribution Company Limited supplied electricity to users in the County of Durham in northeast England. Supplies were provided from 1901 until the company was absorbed into the Newcastle-upon-Tyne Electrical Supply Company in 1932.

See below for County of Durham Electric Power Supply Company.

== History ==
County of Durham Electric Power Supply Act 1900
- Act of Parliament
- Parliament of the United Kingdom
- Long title: An Act for incorporating and conferring powers upon the County of Durham Electric Power Supply Company and for other purposes.
- Citation: 63 & 64 Vict. c. ccxxxi

Dates
- Royal assent: 6 August 1900

County of Durham Electric Power Supply Act 1906
- Act of Parliament
- Parliament of the United Kingdom
- Long title: An Act for conferring further powers upon the County of Durham Electric Power Supply Company and for other purposes.
- Citation: 6 Edw. 7. c. clxxxii

Dates
- Royal assent: 4 August 1906

County of Durham Electric Power Supply Act 1909
- Act of Parliament
- Parliament of the United Kingdom
- Long title: An Act to confer further powers upon the County of Durham Electric Power Supply Company and for other purposes.
- Citation: 9 Edw. 7. c. xxxvi

Dates
- Royal assent: 16 August 1909

The County of Durham Electrical Power Distribution Company Limited was registered on 19 April 1899. It obtained legal powers for the supply of electricity on the south of the River Tyne, which included engineering works and collieries. Electricity was bought in bulk from the County of Durham Electric Power Supply Company. It was distributed from about 24 substations throughout the supply area. The total connections, units sold and profits were:

County of Durham Electrical Power Distribution Company operations
Year	Connections, Horse-Power	Electricity sold actual, MWh	Electricity sold projected, MWh	Profit
1901		568.2		
1902		25,26.3		
1903		3,630.8		
1904		4,437.6		
1905			6,500	£14,200
1906	13,200		13,000	£26,000
1907	20,757		20,000	£45,500
1908	29,366		37,000	£57,500
1909	35,024			
1910	39,070			
1911	43,525			
1912	54,525			

In 1915 electric current was supplied at:

- 3-phase, AC, 40 Hz, 5,750 & 2,750 V
- 3-phase, AC, 40 Hz, 440 & 240 V
- DC, 480 & 240 V

=== Directors ===
Until 1905 the distribution company was run from London by the British Electric Traction Company. In 1905 the board of directors was reconstituted under local management. This had been facilitated by the financial difficulties of Emile Garcke's company. The Newcastle-upon-Tyne Electric Supply Company (NESCo) purchased the Distribution Company and County of Durham Electric Power Supply Company. The companies were physically connected through cables running across the High Level Bridge across the Tyne.

The directors in 1905 were:

- John Theodore Merz (chair)
- John Hobart Armstrong
- Robert Spence Watson
- Sir Lindsay Wood
- William Leonard Madgen
- Sir Thomas Richardson
- Robert Patrick Sloan

The distribution company offered shares on the stock market, such as £500,000 in 1905.

The board in 1915 comprised:

- John Theodore Merz (chair)
- John Hobart Armstrong
- Sir Lindsay Wood
- William Leonard Madgen
- Robert Patrick Sloan

The company was dissolved in 1933 under the provisions of the North-Eastern Electric Supply Act 1932 (22 & 23 Geo. 5. c. xxxii).

== County of Durham Electric Power Supply Company ==
County of Durham Electric Power Supply Company
- Company type: Public company
- Industry: Electricity generation and supply
- Founded: 1900
- Defunct: 1933
- Fate: Take over
- Successor: NESCo
- Products: Electricity

The County of Durham Electric Power Supply Company was incorporated in 1900. Supply of electricity commenced in December 1901 to an area of 250 square miles. Current was bought in bulk from NESCo and other undertakings and was supplied to the County of Durham Electrical Power Distribution Company Limited.

=== Directors ===
The board, in 1915, comprised:

- John Hobart Armstrong (chair)
- John Theodore Merz
- Sir Lindsay Wood
- William Leonard Madgen
- Robert Patrick Sloan

The company was dissolved in 1933 under the provisions of the North-Eastern Electric Supply Act 1932 (22 & 23 Geo. 5, c. xxxii).

== See also ==
- List of pre-nationalisation UK electric power companies
