= Timeline of the UK electricity supply industry =

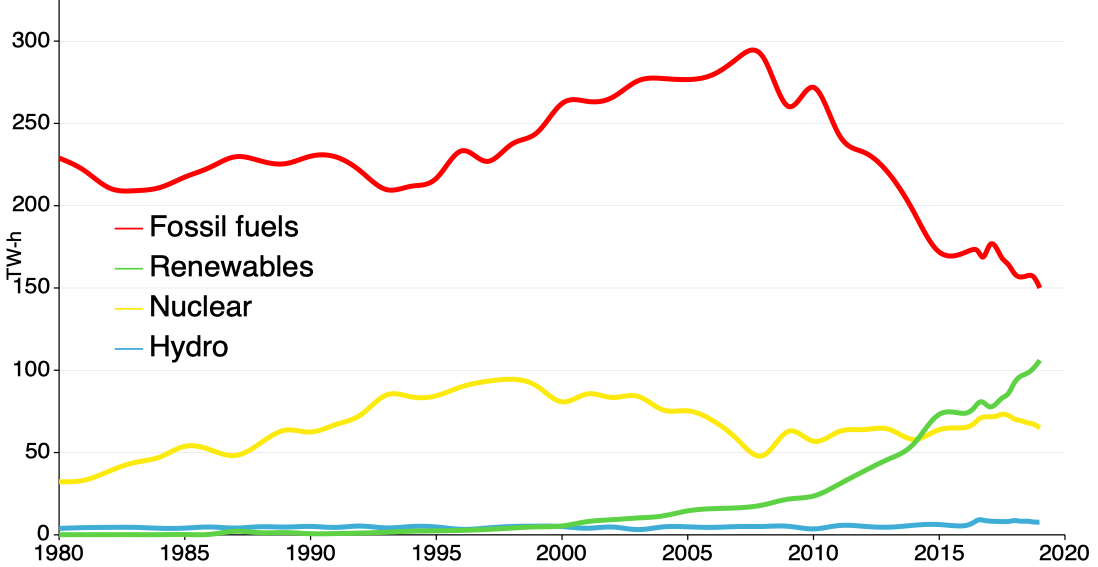
UK electricity production by source 1980–2018

This timeline outlines the key developments in the United Kingdom electricity industry from the start of electricity supplies in the 1870s to the present day. It identifies significant developments in technology for the generation, transmission and use of electricity; outlines developments in the structure of the industry including key organisations and facilities; and records the legislation and regulations that have governed the UK electricity industry.

The first part is a chronological table of significant events; the second part is a list of local acts of Parliament (1879–1948) illustrating the growth of electricity supplies.

== Significant events ==
The following is a list of significant events in the history of the electricity sector in the United Kingdom.

Year	Event
1860s–70s	Public demonstrations of electric lighting in Britain stimulate interest in the new technology, such as the temporary illumination of Bristol's Clifton Suspension Bridge in December 1864 to mark its opening.
1879	The Liverpool (Corporation) Electric Lighting Act 1879 (42 & 43 Vict. c. ccxiii) is the first electric lighting act to be enacted in the UK, giving the Liverpool Corporation powers to light streets by electricity.
1882	The Electric Lighting Act 1882 (repealed 1989) allows the setting up of supply systems by persons, companies or local authorities. Local authorities had the right to take over the assets of companies in their area after 21 years, which discouraged enterprise.
1882	The Edison Electric Light Station opens as the world's first coal-fired power station at 57 Holborn Viaduct, London, producing 110 volt DC for street lighting. It ran at a loss and closed in 1886.
1888	The Electric Lighting Act 1888 (repealed 1989) amends the 1882 act, making the setting up of a supply company easier, and extending the reversion to local authority period to 42 years, with optional 10-year extensions.
1890	The Belfast Electric Lighting Order 1890, confirmed by the Electric Lighting Orders Confirmation (No. 7) Act 1890 gives the County Borough of Belfast the authority to generate and sell electricity throughout the city.
1890	The Electric Lighting (Scotland) Act 1890
1891	London Electric Supply Corporation opens Deptford Power Station, the UK's first (single-phase) AC power system, designed by Sebastian Ziani de Ferranti.
1893	Bristol Corporation Electricity Committee opens its first generating station, at Temple Back, on 28 August.
1894	Electricity is supplied to Londonderry under the provisions of the Londonderry Electric Lighting Order 1891 confirmed by the Electric Lighting Orders Confirmation (No. 3) Act 1891. Further powers were given by the Londonderry Corporation Act 1918.
1899	The Electric Lighting (Clauses) Act 1899 (repealed 1989) introduces common principles for provisional orders, and prohibits the amalgamation of undertakings and the supply of electricity outside a prescribed area.
1901	Newcastle upon Tyne Electric Supply Company opens Neptune Bank Power Station, the first in the UK to supply three-phase electric power.
1902	The Electric Lighting (Scotland) Act 1902
1904	The London Electric Lighting Areas Act 1904 amends the service areas of utilities.
1905	Start-up of Lots Road Power Station to supply London's underground electric railways.
1906	Start-up of Greenwich power station (four 3,500 kW units) by the London County Council to power London's tramway system.
1908	The London Electric Supply Act 1908 transfers the purchasing powers of local authorities to the London County Council.
1909	The Electric Lighting Act 1909 (repealed 1989) regulates planning consent for building power stations.
1910	The London Electric Supply Act 1910 constitutes the London County Council purchasing authority for utilities to which the 1908 act did not apply.
1919	Williamson Report and Birchenough Report leads to the Electricity (Supply) Act 1919 (repealed 1989). Establishes the Electricity Commission and appoints Electricity Commissioners to provide central coordination, regional organisation and to centralise generation in large power stations owned by joint electricity authorities.
1919	Ministerial oversight of the electricity industry is transferred from the Board of Trade to the newly established Ministry of Transport.
1922	The Electricity (Supply) Act 1922 (repealed 1989) grants financial powers to joint electricity authorities; four were established in the following years.
1924	The UK's first hyperbolic reinforced concrete cooling tower is constructed by L. G. Mouchel & Partners at Lister Drive power station in Liverpool.
1925	The London Electricity (No. 1) Act 1925 allows the amalgamation of four electricity undertakings in south and east London.
1925	The London Electricity (No. 2) Act 1925 (14 & 15 Geo. 5. c. lxiii) allows the amalgamation of ten electricity undertakings, mainly in south and west London, and the formation of the London Power Company to centralise the generation of electricity in a small number of large power stations, e.g. Willesden, Bow, Deptford and Battersea.
1925	The Statutory Gas Companies (Electricity Supply Powers) Act 1925 facilitates the supply of electricity by permitting gas companies to supply electricity.
1926	Weir Report leads to the Electricity (Supply) Act 1926 (repealed 1989), which creates the Central Electricity Board and the National Grid operating at 132 kV (50 Hz).
1927	The London and Home Counties Joint Electricity Authority Act 1927 confers additional powers on the London and Home Counties Joint Electricity Authority.
1928	The Electricity (Supply) Act 1928 makes minor amendments to the 1919 act.
1931	The Electricity (Supply) Act (Northern Ireland) 1931 creates a state-appointed Electricity Board for Northern Ireland.
1932	Construction of the 132 kV crossing over the River Thames between Dagenham and Woolwich. The 487 ft (148 m) towers become the tallest in the UK; the span is 3060 ft (933 m).
1932	The Railway (Standardisation of Electrification) Order 1932 (SR&O 1932/827) allows only the 1,500 V DC system for overhead current collection and 750 V DC for conductor rail.
1933	The 132 kV National Grid starts operating as an interconnected set of regional grids.
1933	Commissioning of Battersea A power station by the London Power Company.
1933	The Electricity (Supply) Act 1933 makes minor amendments to the 1919 and 1922 acts.
1935	The Electricity (Supply) Act 1935 regularises grid tariffs for marginal power stations and allows the CEB to supply electricity to railways directly.
1936	The Electricity Supply (Meters) Act 1936 (repealed 1989) permits the appointment of inspectors to 'officially certify as appropriate for the measurement of supplies of electricity' the electricity meters installed in consumers' premises.
1938	The 132 kV National Grid became integrated.
1939	The Fuel and Lighting Order 1939 (SR&O 1939/1028) requires consumers to reduce their use of electricity and gas to 75 per cent of peacetime levels.
1940	The Special Enactments (Extension of Time) Act 1940 suspends the right of local authorities to acquire company electricity undertakings, which may have harmed development and led to fragmentation.
1941	Ministerial oversight of the electricity industry is transferred from the newly established Ministry of War Transport back to the Board of Trade.
1942	Establishment of the Ministry of Fuel and Power to provide strategic oversight of the coal, gas, electricity and oil industries.
1943	The Hydro-Electric Development (Scotland) Act 1943 (repealed 1989) nationalises the development of Highland water resources and establishes the North of Scotland Hydro-Electric Board to design, construct and manage hydro-electricity projects in the Highlands of Scotland.
1947	The Electricity Act 1947 (repealed 1989) merges 625 electricity companies, to be vested in twelve area electricity boards, whilst the generation and 132 kV National Grid are vested with the British Electricity Authority.
1947	The Control of Turbo-alternators (No. 1) Order 1947 (SR&O 1947/2386) standardises steam-driven sets to two sizes: 30 MW and 60 MW. The order was revoked in 1950.
1948	The Electricity (Supply) Act (Northern Ireland) 1948 establishes the Northern Ireland Joint Electricity Committee and transfers the electricity 'property, rights and assets' from the Ministry of Commerce to the Electricity Board for Northern Ireland.
1949	The UK's first large scale use of the 'unit boiler' with reheat at Dunston B power station, with a boiler dedicated to a turbo-alternator set.
1952	The ±100 kV DC submarine cable link between UK and France is commissioned, designed to transfer 160 MW in either direction between Dungeness and Boulogne (30 miles). It was decommissioned in 1982.
1952	The North Wales Hydro-Electric Power Act 1952 extends the catchment area of the Dolgarrog and Meantwrog stations and allowed a 10 MW extension to Dolgarrog station.
1952	The Electricity Supply (Meters) Act 1952 extends the transitional period of the Electricity Supply (Meters) Act 1936 to 30 June 1958.
1953	The first section of the 275 kV grid commissioned, a 41-mile single circuit between Staythorpe (Nottinghamshire) and West Melton.
1954	The Electricity Reorganisation (Scotland) Act 1954 (repealed 1989) transfers control of electricity supplies in Scotland to the Secretary of State for Scotland.
1954	The Atomic Energy Authority Act 1954 establishes the Atomic Energy Authority (as a nationalised industry) to provide oversight of the field of atomic energy in the UK.
1954	The Rights of Entry (Gas and Electricity Boards) Act 1954 defines the rights of electricity suppliers to enter premises.
1955	On 1 April the British Electricity Authority becomes the Central Electricity Authority. The Scottish area boards are merged into South of Scotland Electricity Board and the North of Scotland Hydro-Electric Board.
1955	The North Wales Hydro-Electric Power Act 1955 empowers the Central Electricity Authority to construct hydro-electric power stations at Ffestiniog and Rheidol.
1956	Commissioning of the UK's first 100 MW turbo-alternator at Castle Donington power station, which eventually had six 100 MW units.
1956	The Herbert Committee (appointed in 1954) reports on the organisation and efficiency of electricity supply in the UK. The committee's criticism of the dual role of generating power and supervising the industry leads to the Electricity Act 1957.
1957	The Electricity Act 1957 (repealed 1989) dissolves the Central Electricity Authority and replaces it by the Central Electricity Generating Board and the Electricity Council.
1957	Commissioning of the UK's first cyclone-fired boiler at Barking C power station, built by Babcock & Wilcox and delivering 540,000 lb/hr of steam.
1958	The new chairman of the Central Electricity Generating Board Christopher Hinton, Baron Hinton of Bankside begins the procurement of the new 2,000 MW power stations and 400kV grid system known as the Hinton Heavies.
1959	The Electricity (Borrowing Powers) Act 1959 limits the borrowing powers of the Electricity Council, the CEGB and the area boards to £1,800 million.
1959	The first 275 kV cables are commissioned, connecting a generator transformer at Drakelow B power station to the National Grid.
1959	Commissioning of the UK's first 200 MW turbo-alternator at High Marnham power station with advanced steam conditions of 2,350 psi at 1,050 °F. High Marnham is Europe's first 1,000 MW power station.
1960	A proposed 2,000 MW (potentially 4,000 MW) power station at Holme Pierrepont is rejected by the planning inspector on amenity grounds.
1961	The Electricity (Amendment) Act 1961 (repealed 1989) enables the Central Electricity Generating Board to manufacture radioisotopes in association with its nuclear reactors – previously the Electricity Act 1957 had barred the body from carrying out functions other than the production of electricity.
1962	Commissioning of the UK's first commercial nuclear (Magnox) power stations, the 275 MW Berkeley power station in Gloucestershire in June, and the 300 MW Bradwell station in Essex in July.
1962	Commissioning of the UK's first 275 MW turbo-alternator at Blyth B power station.
1963	The Electricity and Gas Act 1963 (repealed 1989) increases the borrowing powers of the Electricity Council, electricity boards, the Gas Council and area gas boards.
1965	Introduction of the first phase of the 400 kV Supergrid from West Burton power stations in Nottinghamshire to Sundon in Bedfordshire. The 150-mile line has a capacity of 1,800 MVA.
1965	Three cooling towers at Ferrybridge C power station collapse. The design had underestimated wind-loading; the CEGB instigates a programme of cooling tower reinforcement.
1965	Commissioning of the UK's first 350 MW turbo-alternators at Drakelow C and Blyth B power stations.
1966	Commissioning of the 580 MW Sizewell A nuclear power station in Suffolk.
1966	Commissioning of the UK's first 500 MW turbo-alternator at Ferrybridge C power station. This became a standard size, planned to be used in 49 units at 14 new power stations.
1966	The first single stack chimney with four flues in one stack is completed at Eggborough power station.
1966	The first 275 kV substation in London at Tottenham.
1967	One of the 65 MW units at Hams Hall C power station is experimentally converted to burn natural gas in addition to coal. The station was fully converted to dual coal/gas firing in 1971.
1967	The Electricity (Supply) Act (Northern Ireland) 1967 establishes the Northern Ireland Joint Electricity Authority, with wider powers to supervise and control generation, transmission and the preparation of generating plant programmes.
1968	The Gas and Electricity Act 1968 (repealed 1989) further increases the borrowing powers of the Gas Council and area gas boards, the Electricity Council, and Scottish electricity boards.
1969	The first of the new 2,000 MW generating units is officially opened by the Minister of Power, Roy Mason, at West Burton.
1971	The CEGB is reorganised to give more authority to the five operating regions; project groups and specialist departments are merged into the Generation Development and Construction Division.
1972	The Electricity Act 1972 (repealed 1989) raises the limit on the borrowing powers of the Electricity Council and the electricity boards in England and Wales to £5,200 million.
1973	The Fuel and Electricity (Control) Act 1973 controls the production, supply, acquisition and use of certain substances and of electricity.
1973	The North Wales Hydro Electric Power Act 1973 empowers the Central Electricity Generating Board to construct a hydroelectric power station at Dinorwig.
1974	Commissioning of the UK's first 660 MW turbo-alternator at Drax power station.
1974	Barton, Newton Abbot, Plymouth 'A', and Letchworth power stations are decommissioned on 18 March.
1975	Battersea A power station decommissioned on 17 March.
1976	The Energy Act 1976 allows the Secretary of State, for conservation purposes, to regulate or prohibit the production, supply, acquisition or use of petroleum, natural gas, petroleum products, electricity any other substance used as fuel.
1976	The UK's first advanced gas-cooled reactor (AGR) nuclear power stations are commissioned, at Hinkley Point B in Somerset and Hunterston B in Strathclyde.
1976	The CEGB announces the decommissioning of 2,884 MW of excess generating capability: 23 power stations closed and 18 partly closed on 25 October.
1976	Barking 'B', Brighton 'A', Castlemeads, Cowes, and Portishead 'A' power stations decommissioned on 15 March.
1976	Hackney 'B', Peterborough, Burton, Coventry, Leicester, Meaford 'A', Northampton, Worcester, Bradford, Darlington, Wolverhampton, Ferrybridge 'A', Neepsend, Sculcoates, Sunderland, York (Foss islands), Blackburn, Lancaster, Ribble 'B', Stockport, Trafford, and Stuart Street power stations decommissioned on 25 October. A total of 1,967 MW decommissioned in 1976.
1977	A further 650 MW of generating capacity is decommissioned in March: six stations closed and two partially closed.
1977	Lincoln, Llynfi, and Hayle power stations are decommissioned on 21 March. A total of 227 MW.
1978	Economy 7 night-time tariffs are introduced.
1978	Rotherham, Ocker Hill, Stourport 'A', and Woolwich power stations are decommissioned on 30 October 1978. A total of 226 MW.
1978	The Nuclear Safeguards and Electricity (Finance) Act 1978 grants the CEGB £50 million to build the second phase of Drax power station.
1979	The Electricity (Scotland) Act 1979 (repealed 1989) consolidates previous enactments for the supply of electricity in Scotland.
1979	The first use of gas turbines for main power generation at Letchworth (Hertfordshire), Ocker Hill (Tipton Staffordshire), Taylors Lane (Willesden London) and Watford (Hertfordshire) power stations. These were 70 MW generators using Rolls-Royce Olympus jet engines. Previously, gas turbines had been used as auxiliary units, supplying station auxiliaries and for peak-shaving.
1979	Bolton power station decommissioned on 19 March.
1979	Harts Head and Warrington power stations decommissioned on 29 October. A total of 152 MW is decommissioned during 1979.
1980	Carlisle, Kearsley, Blackburn Meadows, Ironbridge A (part), and Kingston power stations decommissioned on 27 October – a total of 544 MW.
1981	The CEGB decommissions 3,400 MW of generating capacity, permanently closing 2,082 MW in 16 power stations, with 1,320 MW retained unused in reserve.
1981	Prototype assisted draft cooling tower commissioned at Ince B power station using 36 fans in place of three conventional cooling towers.
1981	Bold 'A', Fleetwood, Dunston, Huddersfield, Mexborough, Hams Hall 'B', Nottingham, Barking, Blackwell Point, Little Barford 'A', and Uskmouth 'A' power stations decommissioned on 26 October. A total of 1,585 MW.
1982	Walsall power station decommissioned on 1 March.
1982	Spondon power station decommissioned on 1 October.
1982	Chatterton 'B', Thornhill, Nechells 'B', and Rye House power stations decommissioned on 1 November. A total of 906 MW for 1982.
1983	The Energy Act 1983 allows small-scale private generators.
1983	Acton Lane, Battersea, Deptford, Goldington, West Ham, Staythorpe 'A', Doncaster, North Tees 'C', and Skelton Grange 'A' power stations decommissioned on 31 October 1983. A total of 1,229 MW.
1984	A cooling tower at Fiddler's Ferry power station collapses in high winds. Investigations showed this was due to an imperfection in the shape of the shell above the ring beam.
1986	The ±270 kV DC submarine cable link between UK and France is commissioned, capable of transferring 2,000 MW.
1988	The UK accepts the EC's Large Combustion Plant Directive to address environmental damage from acid rain.
1988	The Electricity (Financial Provisions) (Scotland) Act 1988 increases the borrowing powers of the Scottish electricity boards to £3,000 million.
1989	The Electricity Act 1989 provides for the privatisation of the electricity industry, and introduces the Fossil Fuel Levy to support the nuclear power industry. The act establishes the Office of Electricity Regulation (OFFER) to promote competition in the industry and to protect consumers' interests.
1990	Beginning of the privatization of the Central Electricity Generating Board. The assets of the CEGB are broken up into three new companies: Powergen, National Power and National Grid Company. Later, the nuclear component within National Power will be removed and vested in another state-owned company called Nuclear Electric.
1991	Scottish industry privatised.
1992	Electricity supply in Northern Ireland privatised. Premier Power formed. On 1 March the Office of Director General of Electricity Supply for Northern Ireland is established under the Electricity (Northern Ireland) Order 1992.
1993	Supply industry in Northern Ireland privatised.
1994	Value-added tax (VAT) of 8% imposed on domestic energy.
1995	Major assets of Nuclear Electric and Scottish Nuclear are merged, including the UK's eight most advanced nuclear plants, forming a new private company, British Energy.
1995	National Grid Company plc becomes part of National Grid Group plc.
1997	Pembroke Power Station closes, the first of the 500 MW Hinton Heavies.
2000	Section 1 of the Utilities Act 2000 establishes the Office of Gas and Electricity Markets (OFgem) which merges and abolishes the Office of Electricity Regulation (OFFER) and Office of Gas Supply (OFGAS).
2000	Section 62 of the Utilities Act 2000 empowers the Secretary of State to impose obligations on all licensed electricity suppliers for a proportion of their total supply of electricity to consumers to be from renewable sources.
2000	The Isle of Man to England Interconnector is commissioned, at 104 km the longest AC submarine power cable in the world.
2001	The Central Electricity Generating Board (Dissolution) Order 2001 (SI 2001/3421) formally winds-up the CEGB. The Electricity Council (Dissolution) Order 2001 (SI 2001/3420) formally winds-up the Electricity Council.
2002	National Grid Group plc merges with Lattice Group (including Transco plc), to form National Grid Transco plc. The National Grid and the gas National Transmission System are now managed by a single holding company.
2003	The Energy (Northern Ireland) Order 2003 (NI SI 2003/419) establishes the Northern Ireland Authority for Energy Regulation and abolishes the offices of Director General of Gas for Northern Ireland and Director General of Electricity Supply for Northern Ireland. The Electricity (Miscellaneous Provisions) Act 2003 provides for financial assistance to British Energy plc.
2004	The Energy Act 2004 establishes the Nuclear Decommissioning Authority and defines responsibilities for the decommissioning and cleaning up of civil nuclear installations and sites.
2005	National Grid Transco plc renamed National Grid plc.
2007	From 1 November, Northern Ireland generators must sell their electricity into the Single Electricity Market, an all-island market with the Republic of Ireland from which suppliers purchase electricity at a single market rate.
2008	The Energy Act 2008 establishes the Renewables Obligation to support generating electricity from renewable sources; makes provisions for the decommissioning and clean-up of nuclear sites; and the provision of smart meters.
2009	After becoming the UK's largest electricity generation company, British Energy is bought by Électricité de France (EDF), a state-owned company.
2010	The Energy Act 2010 requires the government to prepare reports on the progress made on the decarbonisation of electricity generation in Britain and the development and use of carbon capture and storage; and to create schemes for energy suppliers to give benefits to customers to reduce fuel poverty.
2011	BritNed, the 450 kV DC submarine inter-connector cable between the UK (Isle of Grain, Kent) and the Netherlands (Maasvlakte, Rotterdam), is commissioned. It is 260 km long and has a capacity of 1,000 MW.
2012	The East–West Interconnector, the ±200 kV DC submarine and underground power cable between Pentir, North Wales and Arklow, County Wicklow, is commissioned. It is 261 km long and has a capacity of 500 MW.
2012	Kingsnorth Power Station ceases generation on 17 December, the next Hinton Heavy to face closure.
2013	Didcot Power Station ceases generation on 22 March.
2013	Fawley Power Station closes on 31 March.
2015	Ironbridge Power Station is switched off on 20 November.
2016	Ferrybridge Power Station closes on 31 March.
2016	Rugeley Power Station closes.
2018	Eggborough Power Station stops generating on 23 March.
2018	The Domestic Gas and Electricity (Tariff Cap) Act 2018
2019	The 400 kV DC NEMO inter-connector connecting the UK (Richborough, Kent) with Belgium (Zeebrugge) is commissioned on 31 January. It is 140 km long and has a capacity of 1,000 MW (8.76 TWh a year).
2019	Cottam Power Station stops generating on 30 September, the latest of the Hinton Heavies to close. Aberthaw power station (a Hinton Heavy) closes on 13 December.
2020	Fiddler's Ferry power station (another Hinton Heavy) closes on 31 March.
2021	IFA-2 (Interconnexion France-Angleterre 2), a 204 km 1,000 MW ± 320 kV DC subsea electrical interconnector between France and the United Kingdom is commissioned in January. ElecLink, a 51 km system of 1,000 MW ± 320 kV DC cables within the north running tunnel of the Channel Tunnel between France and the United Kingdom, is energised 1 on September.
2022	Hunterston B nuclear power station closes on 7 January.
2023	West Burton power station closes on 31 March.
2024	Ratcliffe-on-Soar power station, the last to be coal-fired, closes on 30 September.

== Local legislation timeline ==
In addition to the public general acts on electricity supply given in the above table, there were also local acts. The Electric Lighting Acts 1882 to 1909 permitted local authorities and companies to apply to the Board of Trade for provisional orders and licences to supply electricity. The orders were confirmed by local Electric Lighting Orders Confirmation Acts. Local authorities and companies could also obtain local acts for electricity supply. A sample of local acts is given in the table below. Note that local acts have a chapter number for the relevant year in lower-case Roman numerals.

Chronological timeline of Local Act electricity legislation in the United Kingdom 1883–1948
Year	Chapter	Title of Act	Provisions
=== 1879 – 1884 ===
1879	ccxiii	Liverpool (Corporation) Electric Lighting Act 1879	
1880	cxxv	Hull (Corporation) Electric Lighting Act 1880	
1881	xxvii	Westgate and Birchington Gas and Electricity Act 1881	
1882	—	—	—
1883	ccxiii	Electric Lighting Orders Confirmation (No. 1) Act	Orders for Cambridge, Canterbury, Chelsea, Finchley, Folkestone, Gravesend, Greenock, Greenwich, High Wycombe, Ipswich, Maidstone, Sunderland
1883	ccxiv	Electric Lighting Orders Confirmation (No. 2) Act	Orders for Aston Manor, Birkdale, Dudley, Saltley, Ulverston, West Bromwich, Wolverhampton
1883	ccxv	Electric Lighting Orders Confirmation (No. 3) Act	Orders for Balsall Heath, Birmingham, Redditch, Walsall
1883	ccxvi	Electric Lighting Orders Confirmation (No. 4) Act	Orders for Barton, Eccles etc., Carlisle, Croydon, Luton, Margate, Nelson, Rochester, Scarborough, Sudbury
1883	ccxvii	Electric Lighting Orders Confirmation (No. 5) Act	Orders for Bermondsey, Clerkenwell, Hampstead, Holborn, Hornsey, St. George's-in-the-East, St. Giles, St. James' & St. Martins, St. Luke, Wandsworth
1883	ccxviii	Electric Lighting Orders Confirmation (No. 6) Act	Orders for Limehouse, Poplar, Richmond, Rotherhithe, St. Giles, St. Saviour's, Shoreditch, Wednesbury & Darlaston
1883	ccxix	Electric Lighting Orders Confirmation (No. 7) Act	Orders for Barnes & Mortlake, Hackney, Islington, St. Pancras, Whitechapel
1883	ccxx	Electric Lighting Orders Confirmation (No. 8) Act	Orders for Bradford, Brighton, Hanover Square, Norwich, South Kensington, Strand, Victoria
1883	ccxxi	Electric Lighting Orders Confirmation (No. 9) Act	Orders for Bristol, Grantham, Lowestoft
1883	ccxxii	Electric Lighting Orders Confirmation (No. 10) Act	Orders for Chiswick, St. George the Martyr
1883	ccxxiii	Electric Lighting Orders Confirmation (No. 11) Act	Orders for North of Scotland, West Hartlepool
1884	xiv	Electric Lighting Orders Confirmation Act	Orders for Edison and Swann United Electric Lighting
1884	xlii	Electric Lighting Order Confirmation (No. 2) Act	Order for Bury St. Edmunds
1884	lxxvi	Electric Lighting Orders Confirmation (No. 3) Act	Orders for St. James, St. Martin and St. George Hanover Square
1884	lxxxiv	Electric Lighting Order Confirmation (No. 4) Act	Order for Fulham District
=== 1885 – 1889 ===
1885	—	—	—
1886	xviii	Electric Lighting Order Confirmation Act	Order for Chelsea
1887	—	—	—
1888	—	—	—
1889	clxxiv	Electric Lighting Orders Confirmation Act	Orders for Birmingham, Liverpool, Swansea
1889	clxxviii	Electric Lighting Order Confirmation (No. 2) Act	Order for London Electric Supply Corp., Westminster
1889	clxxix	Electric Lighting Orders Confirmation (No. 3) Act	Orders for House to House Supply, Kensington and Knightsbridge, Notting Hill, South Kensington
1889	clxxx	Electric Lighting Order Confirmation (No. 4) Act	Order for St. Martin
1889	clxxxi	Electric Lighting Order Confirmation (No. 5) Act	Order for Metropolitan Electric Supply Co.
=== 1890 – 1894 ===
1890	clxxxvi	Electric Lighting Orders Confirmation Act	Orders for Cambridge, Dover, Hove, Walsall, Wolverhampton, Worcester
1890	clxxxvii	Electric Lighting Orders Confirmation (No. 2) Act	Orders for Burnley, Bury, Chester, Fleetwood, Lancaster, Salford
1890	clxxxviii	Electric Lighting Orders Confirmation (No. 3) Act	Orders for Bacup, Bedford, Huddersfield, Malvern, Oldham, Stockton-on-Tees
1890	clxxxix	Electric Lighting Orders Confirmation (No. 4) Act	Orders for Accrington, Barnsley, Blackpool, Burton-upon-Trent, Cheltenham, Darlington
1890	cxc	Electric Lighting Orders Confirmation (No. 5) Act	Orders for Bournemouth, Derby, Hastings and St. Leonard's-on-Sea, Oxford, Portsmouth, Woking
1890	cxci	Electric Lighting Orders Confirmation (No. 6) Act	Orders for Birkenhead, Great Yarmouth, Kingston-upon-Hull, Nottingham, Wigan, York
1890	cxcii	Electric Lighting Orders Confirmation (No. 7) Act	Orders for Belfast, Blackburn, Leicester, Morecambe, Sevenoaks, Tunstall
1890	cxciii	Electric Lighting Orders Confirmation (No. 8) Act	Orders for Ayr, Bognor, Eastbourne, Galway, Stafford, Tiverton
1890	cxciv	Electric Lighting Orders Confirmation (No. 9) Act	Orders for Lambeth, North London Electric Supply, St. James', London Electric Supply, Wandsworth
1890	cxcvi	Electric Lighting Orders Confirmation (No. 10) Act	Orders for Ashton-under-Lyne, Bournemouth Electric Supply, Coatbridge, Hastings Public Purposes, Northampton, Windsor
1890	cxcvii	Electric Lighting Orders Confirmation (No. 11) Act	Orders for Chatham, Rochester and District, Manchester, Plymouth, Wrexham
1890	cxcviii	Electric Lighting Orders Confirmation (No. 12) Act	Orders for Crystal Palace and District, Metropolitan Electric Supply
1890	cxcv	Electric Lighting Orders Confirmation (No. 13) Act	Orders for Preston, Preston and Fulwood
1890	cxcix	Electric Lighting Orders Confirmation (No. 14) Act	Orders for Aberdeen, Dundee, Glasgow, Kelvinside, Moss side and Stretford
1891	xlix	Electric Lighting Orders Confirmation (No. 1) Act	Orders for Bolton, Canterbury, Dewsbury, Hanley, Harrogate, Sunderland
1891	l	Electric Lighting Orders Confirmation (No. 2) Act	Orders for Ealing, Norwich, Southport, Stockport, Surbiton, Tynemouth
1891	li	Electric Lighting Orders Confirmation (No. 3) Act	Orders for Bishop's Stortford, Croydon, Heckmondwike, Londonderry, Southend, Weston-super-Mare
1891	lii	Electric Lighting Orders Confirmation (No. 4) Act	Orders for Acton, Chiswick, Coventry, Kidderminster, Llanelly, South Shields
1891	lxii	Electric Lighting Orders Confirmation (No. 5) Act	Orders for Bromley, Preston, Scarborough, Torquay, Tunbridge Wells, Withington
1891	lxiii	Electric Lighting Orders Confirmation (No. 6) Act	Orders for the south of Scotland
1891	lxiv	Electric Lighting Orders Confirmation (No. 7) Act	Orders for Hertford, Killarney, Kingston-upon-Thames, Liverpool, Toxteth Park, Whitehaven
1891	civ	Electric Lighting Orders Confirmation (No .8) Act	Orders for Birmingham, Cardiff, Exeter, Ipswich, Whitby
1891	lxv	Electric Lighting Orders Confirmation (No. 9) Act	Orders for Camberwell, Islington, Southwark, Wandsworth, Westminster
1891	ccxii	Electric Lighting Orders Confirmation (No. 10) Act	Orders for the City of London, Clerkenwell, St. Luke Chelsea, Woolwich
1891	cv	Electric Lighting Orders Confirmation (No. 11) Act	Orders for Newport, Poole, Weybridge
1891	cvi	Electric Lighting Orders Confirmation (No. 12) Act	Orders for Leeds, Newcastle upon Tyne
1892	xxxvi	Electric Lighting Orders Confirmation (No. 1) Act	Orders for Glasgow Boundaries
1892	xxxvii	Electric Lighting Orders Confirmation (No. 2) Act	Orders for Aberystwyth, Ashton-under-Lyne, Halifax, Harwich, Limerick, Maidstone
1892	xxxviii	Electric Lighting Orders Confirmation (No. 3) Act	Orders for Kilkenny, Newbury, Sutton, West Ham, Woking
1892	ccxix	Electric Lighting Orders Confirmation (No. 4) Act	Orders for Dublin, Fareham, Liverpool, Sheffield, Waterford
1892	ccxx	Electric Lighting Orders Confirmation (No. 6) Act	Orders for Hampstead, Lambeth, Shoreditch, Whitechapel
1892	ccxxvii	Electric Lighting Orders Confirmation (No. 5) Act	Orders for County of London Electric Supply Company, Southwark, Wandsworth,
1893	xxxv	Electric Lighting Orders Confirmation (No. 2) Act	Orders for Beckenham, Colchester, Eccles, Newcastle-upon-Tyne
1893	xl	Electric Lighting Orders Confirmation (No. 3) Act	Orders for Hackney, Hammersmith, Poplar
1893	lxxxv	City of London Electric Lighting Act 1893	City of London Electric Lighting Company
1893	cvi	Electric Lighting Orders Confirmation (No. 1) Act	Orders for South of Scotland Electricity
1893	cxv	Electric Lighting Orders Confirmation (No. 4) Act	Orders for Altrincham and Bowdon, Barnet, Bridgend, Taunton
1893	cxli	Electric Lighting Order Confirmation (No. 5) Act	Order for Reading
1893	cxlii	Electric Lighting Order Confirmation (No. 6) Act	Order for Islington
1893	cxliii	Electric Lighting Order Confirmation (No. 7) Act	Order for Newmarket
1894	xlix	Electric Lighting Orders Confirmation (No. 1) Act	Orders for Barrow-in-Furness, Buxton, Chepping Wycombe, Chesterfield, St. Helens, West Hartlepool
1894	l	Electric Lighting Orders Confirmation (No. 2) Act	Orders for Grimsby, Harrow, Leyton, Monmouth, Peterborough, St. Austell
1894	cxiv	Electric Lighting Orders Confirmation (No. 3) Act	Orders for Crystal Palace, Oswestry, Plymouth, Shropshire Power Co., Wakefield, Yealdon
1894	cxv	Electric Lighting Orders Confirmation (No. 4) Act	Orders for Aberdare, Birmingham, Chelmsford, Guildford
1894	cxvi	Electric Lighting Orders Confirmation (No. 5) Act	Orders for Clonmel, Moss Side
=== 1895 – 1899 ===
1895	lxvi	Electric Lighting Orders Confirmation (No. 1) Act	Orders for the south of Scotland
1895	lxvii	Electric Lighting Orders Confirmation (No. 2) Act	Orders for Alderley Edge, Leigh, Llandudno, Luton, Radcliffe, Swindon
1895	lxviii	Electric Lighting Orders Confirmation (No. 3) Act	Orders for Carlisle, Pontypool, Walthamstow, Winchester, Worthing
1895	cii	Electric Lighting Orders Confirmation (No. 5) Act	Orders for Bootle, New Windsor, Prescot, Salisbury, Southampton, Windermere
1895	ciii	Electric Lighting Order Confirmation (No. 6) Act	Order for Liverpool
1896	iii	Electric Lighting Order Confirmation (Notting Hill &c.) Act	
1896	lxxxii	Electric Lighting Orders Confirmation (No. 1) Act	Orders for Cowes, Folkestone, Gloucester, Huddersfield, King's Lynn, Manchester, City of Wells
1896	lxxxiii	Electric Lighting Orders Confirmation (No. 2) Act	Orders for Colwyn Bay, Devonport, Godalming, Kettering, Kingstown, Middleton
1896	lxxxiv	Electric Lighting Orders Confirmation (No. 6) Act	Orders for Ashton-on-Mersey, Keswick
1896	cxvii	Electric Lighting Orders Confirmation (No. 3) Act	Orders for Bray, Liverpool, Cork, Queenstown, Rathmines and Rathgar, Sale
1896	cxviii	Electric Lighting Orders Confirmation (No. 4) Act	Orders for Berkhamstead, Crosby, Margate, Pembroke
1896	cxix	Electric Lighting Orders Confirmation (No. 5) Act	Orders for Battersea, Camberwell, St. Saviour's District
1896	clxxv	Electric Lighting Orders Confirmation (No. 7) Act	Orders for Allerton etc., Bath, Merthyr Tydfil
1897	lxi	Electric Lighting Orders Confirmation (No. 1) Act	Orders for Garston, Hoylake, Ipswich, Morley, Wilmslow, Wrexham
1897	lxii	Electric Lighting Orders Confirmation (No. 2) Act	Orders for Darwen, Dundalk, Lincoln, Tonbridge, Ventnor, Wimbledon
1897	lxiii	Electric Lighting Orders Confirmation (No. 3) Act	Orders for Brighouse, Bury St. Edmunds, Dudley, Farnworth, Kearsley, Southampton, Watford
1897	lxiv	Electric Lighting Orders Confirmation (No. 4) Act	Orders for South of Scotland
1897	lxv	Electric Lighting Orders Confirmation (No. 5) Act	Orders for Ambleside, Ballymena, Dorking, Llandrindod Wells, Redditch, Reigate
1897	lxvi	Electric Lighting Orders Confirmation (No. 6) Act	Orders for Barking, Morecambe, Ramsbotton, Swadincote, Wallasey
1897	clx	Electric Lighting Orders Confirmation (No. 7) Act	Orders for Denton, Droylsden, Levenshulme, Moss Side, Stretford, Withington
1897	clxi	Electric Lighting Orders Confirmation (No. 8) Act	Orders for Bangor, Bexhill, Epsom, Galway, Northwich
1897	clxii	Electric Lighting Orders Confirmation (No. 9) Act	Orders for County of London, Fulham, London Electric Supply Corp.
1897	clxiii	Electric Lighting Orders Confirmation (No. 10) Act	Orders for Newmarket, Poole
1897	clxiv	Electric Lighting Orders Confirmation (No. 11) Act	Orders for Blackheath, Newington
1898	xxxvii	Electric Lighting Orders Confirmation (No. 1) Act	Orders for the south of Scotland
1898	xxxviii	Electric Lighting Orders Confirmation (No. 2) Act	Orders for Dartford, East Ham, Ilfracombe, Ossett, Rawmarsh, Rotherham
1898	xxxix	Electric Lighting Orders Confirmation (No. 3) Act	Orders for Batley, Hereford, Hornsey, Ilford, Leigh-on-Sea, Lewes
1898	xl	Electric Lighting Orders Confirmation (No. 4) Act	Orders for Barnes, Chichester, Doncaster, Hove, King's Norton, Leatherhead
1898	xcii	Electric Lighting Orders Confirmation (No. 6) Act	Orders for Colne, East Stonehouse, Margam, Rochdale, St. Anne's-on-Sea, Weymouth and Melcombe Regis.
1898	xciii	Electric Lighting Orders Confirmation (No. 10) Act	Orders for Aston Manor, Darlington, Lowestoft, Oldbury, Smethwick, West Bromwich
1898	xciv	Electric Lighting Orders Confirmation (No. 11) Act	Orders for Chelmsford, Melton Mowbray, Norwich, Preston, Warrington
1898	xcv	Electric Lighting Orders Confirmation (No. 14) Act	Orders for Bolton, Kingswinford, Penarth, Prescot, Shrewsbury, Rothesay, Weymouth, Wooda Bay
1898	cxcix	Electric Lighting Orders Confirmation (No. 9) Act	Orders for the north of Scotland
1898	cc	Electric Lighting Orders Confirmation (No. 13) Act	Orders for Holborn and St. Giles
1898	ccv	Electric Lighting Orders Confirmation (No. 5) Act	Orders for Aldershot, Bridgwater, Chislehurst, Gravesend, Hastings
1898	ccvi	Electric Lighting Orders Confirmation (No. 7) Act	Orders for Middlesbrough, Nuneaton, St. Albans, Whiston, Willesden
1898	ccvii	Electric Lighting Orders Confirmation (No. 8) Act	Orders for Birkdale, Burslem, Chorley, Crewe, Maidenhead, Stoke-upon-Trent
1898	ccxxxiii	Chelsea Electricity Supply Act 1898	Chelsea Electricity Supply Company
1899	xxxiv	Electric Lighting Orders Confirmation (No. 1) Act	Orders for Castleford, East Barnet, Grays, Mexborough, Sutton Coldfield, Worksop
1899	xxxv	Electric Lighting Orders Confirmation (No. 2) Act	Orders for Aylesbury, Hartlepool, Mansfield, Wath-upon-Dearne, Winsford
1899	cxviii	Electric Lighting Order Confirmation (No. 3) Act	Order for Bermondsey
1899	cccvi	Electric Lighting Orders Confirmation (No. 4) Act	Orders for Audenshaw, Bexley, Glossop Corporation, Rhyl, Rugby, Runcorn
1899	lxxxiii	Kensington and Notting Hill Electric Lighting Companies Act 1899	
1899	lxxxviii	Central Electric Supply Company Act 1899	
1899	cxix	Electric Lighting Orders Confirmation (No. 5) Act	Orders for the south of Scotland
1899	cxx	Electric Lighting Orders Confirmation (No. 6) Act	Orders for Ashford, Bognor, Burlsem, Cheltenham, Durham, Haslingden, Ilkeston
1899	cxxi	Electric Lighting Orders Confirmation (No. 7) Act	Orders for Gorton, Heaton Norris, Keighley, Knutsford, Ryde, Walker
1899	cxxii	Electric Lighting Orders Confirmation (No. 8) Act	Orders for Cheriton, Cromer, Erith, Farnborough, Horsham, Teignmouth
1899	cxxiii	Electric Lighting Order Confirmation (No. 9) Act	Order for Clontarf
1899	cxxxv	Electric Lighting Orders Confirmation (No. 10) Act	Orders for Camborne, Dukinfield, Fenton, Finchley, Shipley, Swinton
1899	cxxxvi	Electric Lighting Orders Confirmation (No. 11) Act	Orders for East Retford, Failsworth, Pemberton, Stourbridge, Swinton and Pendleton, Wednesbury
1899	cxxxvii	Electric Lighting Orders Confirmation (No. 12) Act	Orders for Heywood, Longton, Ludlow, Mirfield, Newcastle-upon-Lyme, Rawtenstall
1899	cxxxviii	Electric Lighting Orders Confirmation (No. 13) Act	Orders for South of Scotland Electricity
1899	cxxxix	Electric Lighting Orders Confirmation (No. 14) Act	Orders for Crayford, Halesowen, Handsworth, Lye and Wollescote, Lymington
1899	cxl	Electric Lighting Orders Confirmation (No. 15) Act	Orders for Bethnal Green, Blackheath and Greenwich, Lewisham, Plumstead,
1899	cxxiv	Electric Lighting Orders Confirmation (No. 16) Act	Orders for Broadstairs, Christchurch and District, Guildford, Newport, Sandown and Shanklin, Westgate and Birchington
1899	cxli	Electric Lighting Orders Confirmation (No. 17) Act	Orders for Carshalton, Gateshead, Merthyr Tydfil, Newton Abbot
1899	cxxv	Electric Lighting Order Confirmation (No. 18) Act	Order for Royal Leamington Spa
1899	cxxvi	Electric Lighting Orders Confirmation (No. 19) Act	Orders for Bournemouth, Eastbourne, Hendon, Midland Electric Power Distribution and Lighting
1899	cclxxv	Electric Lighting Order Confirmation (No. 20) Act	Order for City of London Electric Lighting Company
=== 1900 – 1904 ===
1900	xlvi	Electric Lighting Orders Confirmation (No. 1) Act	Orders for Basingstoke, Erdington, Farnham, Felixstowe and Walton, Leek, Littleborough, Maryport, Nantwich, Ormskirk, Penrith
1900	xxii	Electric Lighting Orders Confirmation (No. 2) Act	Orders for Brierley Hill, Cleethorpes, Elland, Exmouth, Newark, Penzance, Prestwich, Redcar, Sowerby Bridge, Whitefield
1900	xlvii	Electric Lighting Orders Confirmation (No. 3) Act	Orders for Allerton, Much Woolton, Little Woolton and Childwall, Barnet, Barnstaple, Birkenhead, Bonchurch, Boston, Brierfield, Egremont, Hyde, Sudbury
1900	xlviii	Electric Lighting Orders Confirmation (No. 4) Act	Orders for Bredbury & Romiley, Bridlington, Cheadle & Gatley, Hebburn, Kendal, Long Eaton, Lytham, Ormesby, Sleaford, Tunstall
1900	xlix	Electric Lighting Orders Confirmation (No. 5) Act	Orders for Bishop Auckland, Caterham, Cowpen, Grantham, Nuneaton & Chilvers, Ogmore Valley, Redruth, St. Helens, South Blyth, Weybridge
1900	lxxxviii	City of London Electric Lighting Act 1900	City of London Electric Lighting Company
1900	cv	Cork Electric Tramways (Extension) Act 1900	Cork Electric Tramways and Lighting Company
1900	clxvi	Electric Lighting Orders Confirmation (No. 6) Act	Orders for Barmouth, Brechin, Clacton, Cleckheaton, Hythe, Liversedge, Llandilo, Ramsgate, Romford, Sandgate
1900	clxvii	Electric Lighting Orders Confirmation (No. 7) Act	Orders for Berwick-upon-Tweed, Harrow-on-the-Hill, Malton, Midland Electric Power and Lighting, Newhaven, Seaford, Thirsk, Totnes, Witney, Woking
1900	clxviii	Electric Lighting Orders Confirmation (No. 8) Act	Orders for South of Scotland and North of Scotland
1900	clxvix	Electric Lighting Orders Confirmation (No. 9) Act	Orders for Barnard Castle, Cheltenham, Freshwater and Totland, Gosforth, Jarrow, Llanrwst, Pwellheli, Royal Leamington Spa, Twickenham, Wallington
1900	clxx	Electric Lighting Orders Confirmation (No. 12) Act	Orders for Banbury, Dartmouth, Gosport and Alverstoke, Heston and Isleworth, Sheerness, Spennymoor, Staines, Egham and Chertsey, Stamford, Uxbridge and District
1900	ccvii	Electric Lighting Orders Confirmation (No. 10) Act	Orders for Battersea, Limehouse, Mile End, St. George in the East
1900	ccxl	Newcastle-upon-Tyne Electric Supply Company Act 1900	Newcastle upon Tyne Electric Supply Company
1900	ccxxvii	Charing Cross Electricity Supply Corporation (Further Powers) Act 1900	Charing Cross and Strand Electricity Supply Corporation
1900	ccxxxv	Lancashire Electric Power Act 1900	
1900	cclxxvi	North Metropolitan Electric Power Supply Act 1900	
1900	cclxxxii	South Wales Electrical Power Distribution Company Act 1900	Incorporates the South Wales Electrical Power Distribution Company.
1901	cxxxvii	Electric Lighting Order Confirmation (No. 1) Act	Confirming an order for St Marylebone Borough Council to purchase the local undertakings from the Metropolitan Electric Supply Company
1901	xxxvii	Electric Lighting Orders Confirmation (No. 2) Act	Orders for Abertillery, Aspull, Briton Ferry, Cannock, Ebbw Vale, Faversham, Llanduff and Dinas, Llangolleen, Neath, Tredegar
1901	xxxviii	Electric Lighting Orders Confirmation (No. 3) Act	Orders for Birstall, Cheshunt, Dorchester, Felling, Frome, Lichfield, Mitcham, New Hunstanton, Northfleet, Skipton
1901	xxxix	Electric Lighting Orders Confirmation (No. 4) Act	Orders for Atheerton, Benwell and Fenham, Beverley, Burgess Hill, Chesham, East Cowes, Hindley, Honley, Standish-with-Langtree, Stratford-upon-Avon
1901	civ	Cleveland and Durham County Electric Power Act 1901	
1901	cxvi	Yorkshire Electric Power Act 1901	
1901	cxxi	Derbyshire and Nottinghamshire Electric Power Act 1901	
1901	cxxxviii	Electric Lighting Orders Confirmation (No. 5) Act	Orders for Macclesfield, Ripon, Todmorden, Trowbridge, Ware, Wellingborough, Wellington, Widnes, Wisbech, Workington
1901	cxxxix	Electric Lighting Orders Confirmation (No. 6) Act	Orders for Aberavon, Ashton-in-Makerfield, Hampton, Hoddesdon, Ince-in-Makerfield, Mountain Ash, Neath, Pontypridd, Teddington, Worsley
1901	clxxiv	Electric Lighting Orders Confirmation (No. 7) Act	Orders for Barry, Crompton, Foots Cray, Friern Barnet, Isle of Thanet, Newbury, Pudsey, Ross, Roundhay, Royton
1901	clxxv	Electric Lighting Orders Confirmation (No. 8) Act	Orders for the north of Scotland
1901	clxxvi	Electric Lighting Orders Confirmation (No. 9) Act	Orders for Alnwick, Annfield, Benfieldside, Consett, Handsworth, Norton, Pickering, St. Austell, Shildon, Whitley and Monkseaton
1901	cxl	Electric Lighting Orders Confirmation (No. 10) Act	Orders for Blackrock, Dungannon, Kildare, Waterford
1901	clxxvii	Electric Lighting Orders Confirmation (No. 11) Act	Orders for Bromsgrove, Goole, Ilkley, Lyndhurst, Midland Electric Power, Northwood and Ruislip, Rickmansworth, Rishton, Gt. Harwood and Clayton-le-Moors, Warwick
1901	clxxix	Electric Lighting Orders Confirmation (No. 12) Act	Orders for Lewisham, Penge
1901	ccli	West Cumberland Electric Tramways Act 1901	
1902	xxi	Newcastle-upon-Tyne Electric Supply Company's Act 1902	Newcastle upon Tyne Electric Supply Company
1902	xxxiv	Cornwall Electric Power Act 1902	
1902	cxiv	Northumberland Electric Tramways Act 1902	
1902	cxviii	South Wales Electric Power Distribution Company Act 1902	
1902	cxxvii	Kent Electric Power Act 1902	
1902	cxxxi	Leicestershire and Warwickshire Electric Power Act 1902	
1902	cliii	Norwich Corporation (Electricity etc.) Act 1902	
1902	clvi	North Metropolitan Electric Power Supply 1902	
1902	clxxi	Croydon and District Electric Tramways Act 1902	Croydon Corporation Tramways
1902	clxxviii	North and South Shields Electric Railway Act 1902	Tyneside Electrics
1902	xci	Electric Lighting Orders Confirmation (No. 1) Act	Orders for Edmonton, Enfield, Tottenham, Wood Green
1902	lxvii	Electric Lighting Orders Confirmation (No. 2) Act	Orders for Beeston, Carnarvon, Eston, Hebden Bridge, Mytholmroyd, Otley, South Bank in Normanby, Stockton Rural, Thornaby-on-Tees, Tipton
1902	lxviii	Electric Lighting Orders Confirmation (No. 3) Act	Orders for the County of Lancashire, Abram, Holyhead, Hucknall, Leyland, Louth, Penarth, Saddleworth, Springhead, Tyldesley-with-Shakerley
1902	lxix	Electric Lighting Orders Confirmation (No. 4) Act	Orders for Aberdare, Amble, Dover, Frinton-on-Sea, Gillingham, Hindhead and District, Leadgate, Leatherhead, Paignton, Stanley
1902	clxxxvi	Electric Lighting Order Confirmation (No. 5) Act	Order for Glasgow
1902	clxxxvii	Electric Lighting Orders Confirmation (No. 6) Act	Orders for Ardsley East and West, Barton Regis, Blaydon, Chester-le-Street, Church Stretton, Lees, Lower Bebington, Newburn, Seghill, Stanley
1902	ccvi	Electric Lighting Orders Confirmation (No. 7) Act	Orders for Bedlingtonshire, Chepstow, Cowes, Hitchin, Morpeth, Pokesdown, Slough, Stevenage, Tadcaster, Trefriw, West Riding
1902	ccvii	Electric Lighting Orders Confirmation (No. 8) Act	Orders for Bermondsey, Stoke Newington, Woolwich
1902	ccxvi	Liverpool Tramways and Electric Supply Act 1902	
1903	xxv	Cleveland and Durham County Electric Power Act 1903	
1903	xlv	Electric Lighting Order Confirmation (No. 1) Act	Order for Mitchestown
1903	xlvi	Electric Lighting Orders Confirmation (No. 2) Act	Orders for Brixham, Brumby and Frodingham, Dawlish, Horbury, Hucknall-under-Huthwaite, Newton-in-Makerfield, Orrell, Scunthorpe, Sidmouth, Yeovil
1903	xlvii	Electric Lighting Orders Confirmation (No. 3) Act	Orders for Auckland, Carisbrooke and Northwood, Drayton-in-Hales, Illogan, Ingleton, Port Dinorwic, Sevenoaks, South Shields, Stafford, Wilmslow
1903	xlviii	Electric Lighting Orders Confirmation (No. 4) Act	Orders for Borrowstourness, Camburslang, Irvine, Kilmalcolm, Kirkintilloch
1903	lxxxviii	Electric Lighting Orders Confirmation (No. 5) Act	Orders for Abersychan, Calverley, Falmouth, Horsforth, Lauceston, Maesteg, Walton-upon-Thames, Warmley, Whickham, Wigan
1903	xlix	Electric Lighting Orders Confirmation (No. 6) Act	Orders for Bexley, Bridgwater, Bromley, Hendon, Huddersfield, Leatherhead, Prestwich, Stroud, Whitchurch and Pangbourne
1903	lxx	Lanarkshire Electricity Act 1903	
1903	lxxxix	Electric Lighting Orders Confirmation (No. 7) Act	Orders for Cambridge, Isle of Sheppey, Sandwich, Sittingbourne and Milton, Strood and Dartford, Tadcaster, Uxbridge, Wimbledon
1903	clxv	Blackheath and Greenwich District Electric Light Company's Act 1903	
1903	clxxiv	Newcastle-upon-Tyne Electric Supply Company's Act 1903	Newcastle upon Tyne Electric Supply Company
1903	ccx	Carmarthenshire Electric Power Company Act 1903	
1903	ccxiv	Somerset and District Electric Power Act 1903	
1903	cclix	Coventry Electric Tramways Act 1903	
1903	cclxiii	North Metropolitan Electric Power Supply Act 1903	
1903	ccxxi	Fife Electric Power Act 1903	
1903	ccxxxviii	North Western Electricity and Power Act 1903	
1903	ccxli	Scottish Central Electric Power Act 1903	
1903	cclxi	Croydon and District Electric Tramways Act 1903	Croydon Corporation Tramways
1904	xxxiii	Govan Electric Lighting Act 1904	
1904	xli	St. Marylebone Electric Lighting Act 1904	Enabling the St Marylebone Borough Council to borrow money to purchase the local electricity undertakings of the Metropolitan Electric Supply Company as authorised in 1901.
1904	liv	Lancashire Electric Power Act 1904	
1904	lxvi	Electric Lighting Orders Confirmation (No. 1) Act	Orders for County of Lancashire, Barry, Clitheroe, Gainsborough, Glastonbury, Heysham, Kirkby-in-Ashfield, Saffron Walden, Walmer, Whickham, Yardley
1904	lxxiii	Leicestershire and Warwickshire Electric Power Act 1904	
1904	lxxvii	Derbyshire and Nottinghamshire Electric Power Act 1904	
1904	lxxxiv	Clyde Valley Electric Power Act 1904	
1904	cix	North Western Electricity and Power Gas Act 1904	
1904	clxxv	Electric Lighting Orders Confirmation (No. 2) Act	Orders for County of Lancashire, Bath, Brynmawr, Chippenham, Eastleigh and Bishopstoke, Hanwell, Southgate, Tamworth, Walton-le-Dale, Watford, Widnes
1904	clxxvi	Electric Lighting Orders Confirmation (No. 3) Act	Orders for Birkenhead, Bishop Auckland, Huddersfield, Maidenhead, Milford-on-Sea, Newquay, Penzance, Ramsgate, Sunderland, Tavistock
1904	clxxvii	Electric Lighting Orders Confirmation (No. 4) Act	Orders for Ashford, Ely, Ham, Hexham, Horley, Keynsham, Kingswood, Newton Abbot, Teignmouth, Walton-upon-Thames
1904	cxxxi	Electric Lighting Orders Confirmation (No. 5) Act	Orders for Musselburgh, Portpatrick, Wishaw
1904	clxxviii	Electric Lighting Orders Confirmation (No. 6) Act	Orders for Cleveland, Portishead & Long Ashton, Crediton, Devizes, Hampton Wick, Houghton-le-Spring, The Maldens and Coombe, Northampton, Stroud, Nailsworth & Dursley, Trowbridge
1904		Electric Lighting Orders Confirmation (No. 7) Act	
1904	clxxix	Electric Lighting Orders Confirmation (No. 8) Act	Orders for Caerphilly, Epsom, Mansfield Woodhouse, North Worcestershire, Sutton-in-Ashfield
1904	ccvii	Lothians Electric Power Act 1904	
1904	ccxiii	North Wales Electric Power Act 1904	
=== 1905 – 1909 ===
1905	viii	West Cumberland Electric Tramways Act 1905	
1905	xv	Weybridge and Walton-upon-Thames Electric Supply Act 1905	
1905	xvi	Chelsea Electricity Supply Company Act 1905	
1905	xlix	South Wales Electrical Power Distribution Company Act 1905	
1905	lxxix	Electric Lighting Orders Confirmation (No. 1) Act	Orders for Bury, Conway Corporation, Golborne, Haydock, Little Lever, Southall-Norwood, Spalding, Whitwood, Whitworth
1905	lxxx	Electric Lighting Order Confirmation (No. 2) Act	Order for Ballaghadereen
1905	lxxxi	Electric Lighting Order Confirmation (No. 3) Act	Order for Woolwich
1905		~~Electric Lighting Orders Confirmation (No. 4) Act~~	no act with this number was passed
1905	cxiii	Electric Lighting Orders Confirmation (No. 5) Act	Orders for Andover, Burslem (extension to Tunstall), Hessle, Litherland, Little Hulton, Penmaenmawr, Ravensthorpe, Stratford-upon-Avon, Surbiton, Tewkesbury
1905	cxiv	Electric Lighting Orders Confirmation (No. 6) Act	Orders for Barnet, Brockenhurst, Farnham, Gosport, Houghton-le-Spring and District, Lichfield, Ludlow, Lytham, St. Alban's Rural, Ware
1905	lxxxviii	Electric Lighting Orders Confirmation (No. 7) Act	Orders for West Yorkshire, Bishops Stortford, Dover, Hemsworth and District, Marlborough, Tottington, Woking Electric Supply Co. (extension to Chertsey)
1905	cxv	Electric Lighting Orders Confirmation (No. 8) Act	Orders for the south of Scotland and the north of Scotland
1905	cxxxviii	Andover Lighting and Power Act 1905	
1905	cxlvi	Metropolitan Electric Supply Company Act 1905	
1905	clx	Shropshire, Worcestershire and Staffordshire Electric Power Act 1905	
1905	clxiv	Metropolitan Electric Tramways Act 1905	
1905	clxxiv	London Electric Supply Company Act 1905	
1905	clxxvi	North Metropolitan Electric Power Supply Act 1905	
1905	clxxxvi	Central Electric Supply Company Act 1905	
1905	cxcii	Electric Lighting Orders Confirmation (No. 9) Act	Orders for Brentford, Croydon Rural, Durham, Eastbourne Corporation (extension to Willingdon), Gravesend (extension to Northfleet), Kingsbury, Old Windsor, Wimborne and District
1905	cc	Metropolitan Electric Supply Company (Various Powers) Act 1905	
1906	xxiv	Electric Lighting Order Confirmation (No. 1) Act	Order for Waterford
1906	xxv	Electric Lighting Orders Confirmation (No. 2) Act	Orders for Abercarn, Barry, Bettwsycoed, Blaydon, Calverleey, Farsley, Foots Cray, Horsforth, Market Harborough, Wembley
1906	xcii	Cumberland Electricity and Power-Gas Act 1906	
1906	xciii	Folkestone and District Electricity Supply Act 1906	
1906	cxxviii	Electric Lighting Orders Confirmation (No. 3) Act	Orders for the south of Scotland
1906	cxxix	Electric Lighting Orders Confirmation (No. 4) Act	Orders for West Yorkshire, Aylesbury, Boston, Castle Ward, Godalming, Gomersal, Henley-on-Thames, Pinner & Stanmore & Harrow Weald & Edgware, Ryton, Swanage
1906	cx	Electric Lighting Orders Confirmation (No. 5) Act	Orders for Bude, Camberley and District, East Barnet Valley, Exeter, Frome, Higham Ferrers & Rushden & Wellingborough, Mid Durham, Wealdstone, Wisbech and Yardley
1906	cxi	Electric Lighting Order Confirmation (No. 6) Act	Order for the south of Scotland
1906	cxxx	Electric Lighting Orders Confirmation (No. 7) Act	Orders for Barton-upon-Irwell, Cheshunt, Dorchester, Eton, Hexham, Stourport and Kidderminster, Uxbridge and District
1906	cxlvi	Ascot District Gas and Electricity Act 1906	
1906	cxlvii	Derbyshire and Nottinghamshire Electric Power Act 1906	
1906	clii	Twickenham and Teddington Electric Supply Company Act 1906	
1906	clviii	Newcastle upon Tyne Electric Supply Company Act 1906	
1906	clxv	Kent Electric Power Act 1906	
1906	clxxxii	County of Durham Electric Power Supply Act 1906	
1906	clxxxv	Shropshire, Worcestershire and Staffordshire Electric Power Act 1906	
1906	cxci	Hackney Electricity Act 1906	
1906	cxcv	St. Pancras Electricity Act 1906	
1906	cxcvii	South Wales Electrical Power Distribution Company Act 1906	
1906	cxcix	Lancashire Electric Power Act 1906	
1906	cciv	Metropolitan Electric Supply Company Act 1906	
1906	ccix	Edinburgh Suburban Electric Tramways Act 1906	
1907	liv	Electric Lighting Orders Confirmation (No. 1) Act	Orders for West Yorkshire, Aston Manor, Chesham, Hipperholme, Lytham, Newark, Penrith, Pontefract, Stockport
1907	lv	Electric Lighting Order Confirmation (No. 2) Act	Order for Cork Rural
1907	cxiv	Electric Lighting Orders Confirmation (No. 3) Act	Orders for West Yorkshire, Castleford, Egham, Formby, Grimsby, Liversedge, Maldens & Coombe, Mansfield, Paignton, Selby, Stoke-upon-Trent
1907	lvi	Electric Lighting Order Confirmation (No. 4) Act	Order for North of Scotland
1907	lvii	Electric Lighting Orders Confirmation (No. 5) Act	Orders for Minehead and Dunster, Rhymney Valley, St. Albans and District
1907	xci	Electric Supply Corporation Limited Act 1907	
1907	xcviii	North Metropolitan Electric Power Supply Act 1907	
1908	lxxi	South Wales Electrical Power Distribution Company Act 1908	
1908	lxxiv	Wishaw Burgh Electricity Act 1908	
1908	xci	Metropolitan Electric Tramways Act 1908	
1908	cv	Central Ireland Electric Power Act 1908	
1908	cxv	Electric Lighting Orders Confirmation (No. 1) Act	Orders for Bispham-with-Norbreck, Caldy, Carmarthen, Fleetwood, Halesowen, Heswall, Lowestoft, Lymington, Portsmouth, Southampton, Woking
1908	cxvi	Electric Lighting Orders Confirmation (No. 2) Act	Orders for South of Scotland Electricity
1908	cxvii	Electric Lighting Orders Confirmation [(No. 3)] Act	Orders for West Riding, Bridgend, Hendon, Llandaff and Dinas Powis, Llansamlet, Oulton Broad, Sowerby Bridge, Tewskebury
1908	clxvii	London Electric Supply Act 1908	
1909	xii	North Metropolitan Electric Power Supply Act 1909	
1909	xxxiii	York Town and Blackwater Gas (Electric Lighting) Act 1909	
1909	xxxvi	County of Durham Electric Power Supply Act 1909	
1909	lxxviii	West Kent Electric Power Act 1909	
1909	cxli	Electric Lighting Orders Confirmation (No. 1) Act	Orders for Chesham, Cleethorpes, Herne Bay, Hindhead and District, Holsworthy, Southampton, Staines, Stourbridge, Turton, Walton-on-the-Naze
1909	cix	Electric Lighting Order Confirmation (No. 2) Act	Order for South of Scotland Electricity
=== 1910 – 1914 ===
1910	xii	Farnham Gas and Electricity Act 1910	
1910	xvii	Bishop's Stortford, Harlow and Epping Gas and Electricity Act 1910	
1910	xxi	Yorkshire Electric Power Act 1910	Yorkshire Electric Power Company
1910	xxix	Reading and District Electric Supply Act 1910	Extending the area of the Reading Electric Supply Company
1910	lxiii	Electric Lighting Orders Confirmation (No. 3) Act	Orders for Navan and Swinford
1910	lxxv	Electric Lighting Orders Confirmation (No. 1) Act	Orders for Chesham, Church, Clevedon, Dawlish, Derby, Gorseinon, Huddersfield, Ormskirk, Runcorn, Smethwick, Widnes
1910	lxxvi	Electric Lighting Order Confirmation (No. 2) Act	Order for the south of Scotland
1910	lxxviii	Electric Lighting Order Confirmation (No. 4) Act	Order for Bath
1910	cxl	London Electric Supply Act 1910	Made the London County Council the purchasing authority in respect of the undertakings of electric lighting companies in London to which the London Electric Supply Act 1908 did not apply.
1911	xxix	London Electric Railway Act 1911	
1911	xciii	Metropolitan Electric Tramways Act 1911	
1911	cxi	East Kent Electric Power Act 1911	Transferring powers of the Kent Electric Power Company to the South East Kent Electric Power Company.
1911	cxxvii	Edinburgh Suburban Electric Tramways Order Confirmation Act 1911	
1911	clx	Electric Lighting Orders Confirmation (No. 1) Act	Orders for Accrington, Aldeburgh, Ashford, Blandford, Budleigh Salterton, Carlisle, Chichester, Cirencester, Leominster, Newcastle upon Tyne
1911	clxi	Electric Lighting Orders Confirmation (No. 2) Act	Orders for Macclesfield, Pateley Bridge, Portishead, Rhondda, Salisbury, Wimbledon, Witney
1911	clxii	Electric Lighting Orders Confirmation (No. 3) Act	Orders for South of Scotland Electricity, Alloa, Fife electric lighting
1911	clxiii	Electric Lighting Orders Confirmation (No. 4) Act	Orders for Chepping Wycombe, Harrow, Sandwich Deal & Walmer, Sevenoaks
1911	clxiv	Electric Lighting Order Confirmation (No. 5) Act	Order for Donaghadee
1912	lxii	Bognor Gas Light and Coke Company (Electricity) Act 1912	Allowed the Bognor Gas Light and Coke Company to supply electricity within the area they already supplied gas.
1912	lxxxviii	London Electric Railway Act 1912	
1912	lxxxix	Ericht Water and Electric Power Act 1912	
1912	xcviii	National Electric Construction Company Act 1912	
1912	cxiv	Electric Lighting Orders Confirmation (No. 1) Act	Orders for Ardsley, Bingley, Birstall, Burnham (Som.), Great Harwood, Greetland, Hoyland, Launceston, Wimborne
1912	cxv	Electric Lighting Orders Confirmation (No. 2) Act	Orders for Abercarn, Aylesbury, Biddulph, Burnley, Darton, Doncaster, Dorchester, Ilkley, Pontefract, Sherborne
1912	cxvi	Electric Lighting Orders Confirmation (No. 3) Act	Orders for Abingdon, Altrincham, Cheltenham, Goole, Holmfirth, Llanelly, Llantwit, Rothwell, Rushden, Wombwell & Worsborough
1912	clv	Electric Lighting Order Confirmation (No. 4) Act	Order for the south of Scotland
1913	ix	Northern Counties Electricity Supply Company Act 1913	
1913	x	Herne Bay Gas and Electricity Act 1913	
1913	lxx	Kent Electric Power Act 1913	
1913	xcvii	London Electric Railway Act 1913	
1913	cxlix	Electric Lighting Orders Confirmation (No. 1) Act	Orders for Baildon, Beckeenham, Chipping Norton, Hazel Grove, Itchen, Skelton & Brotton, Southborrough, Stoke-on-Trent, Truro, Weaverham
1913	cl	Electric Lighting Orders Confirmation (No. 2) Act	Orders for Barnet, Barton-on-Humber, Basingstoke, Derby, Doncaster, Ellesmere Port, Kingswear, Leatherhead, Mid Sussex Electric Lighting, Northwood & Ruislip
1913	cli	Electric Lighting Order Confirmation (No. 3) Act	Order for South of Scotland
1913	clii	Electric Lighting Orders Confirmation (No. 4) Act	Orders for Lytham, Marlborough, Menai, Neath, Sevenoaks, Stroud, Wolverhampton
1913	cliii	Electric Lighting Orders Confirmation (No. 5) Act	Orders for Caerphilly, Pinner, Smethwick, Watford, Wellingborough
1913	cliv	Electric Lighting Order Confirmation (No. 6) Act	Order for Portrush
1913	clv	Electric Lighting Order Confirmation (No. 7) Act	Order for Romford
1914	xxv	Stone Gas and Electricity Act 1914	
1914	xxx	London Electric Railway Act 1914	
1914	lx	Electric Lighting Orders Confirmation (No. 1) Act	Orders for Hawarden, Kenilworth, Ledbury, Llanfairfechan, Merthyr Tydfil, Newton-in-Makerfield, Oulton Broad, Ruthin, Slaithwaite, Thornton, Yeovil
1914	lxi	Electric Lighting Order Confirmation (No. 3) Act	Order for North of Scotland
1914	lxii	Electric Lighting Order Confirmation (No. 8) Act	Order for Kingstown
1914	lxxviii	North Metropolitan Electric Power Supply Act 1914	
1914	lxxix	Norwich Electric Tramways Act 1914	
1914	lxxxi	Hightown Gas and Electricity Act 1914	
1914	lxxxiii	Deal and Walmer Gas and Electricity Act 1914	
1914	lxxxiv	Shropshire, Worcestershire and Staffordshire Electric Power Act 1914	
1914	lxxxv	Yorkshire Electric Power Act 1914	
1914	cxvii	Electric Lighting Orders Confirmation (No. 2) Act	Orders for Abercarn, Chorley, Farnham, Harwich, Kingston-upo-Hull, Knottingley, Leeds, Warminster
1914	cxviii	Electric Lighting Orders Confirmation (No. 4) Act	Orders for Banstead, Walton-on-the-Hill and Kingswood Electric Lighting, Beeston, Bradford-on-Avon, Feltham, Gelligaer, Heanor and Eastwood, Midhurst, Rickmansworth & Choreley Wood, Colne Valley
1914	cxix	Electric Lighting Orders Confirmation (No. 6) Act	Orders for South of Scotland, Ayr, Edinburgh, Galaashiels
1914	cxx	Electric Lighting Orders Confirmation (No. 7) Act	Orders for Cowbridge & Penybont, Hinckley, Reading, Watford, Whitstable, York
1914	cxxi	Electric Lighting Order Confirmation (No. 9) Act	Order for South of Scotland
1914	clxxv	Electric Lighting Orders Confirmation (No. 5) Act	Orders for Castle Bar, Lurgan, Waterford
=== 1915 – 1919 ===
1915	vii	Ascot District Gas and Electricity Act 1915	
1915	xxi	Ormskirk Gas and Electricity Act 1915	
1915	xxxiii	Electric Lighting Orders Confirmation (No. 1) Act	Orders for Clifden, Enniscorthy
1915	lxviii	London Electric Railway Act 1915	
1915	lxxxiv	Electric Lighting Orders Confirmation (No. 2) Act	Orders for Haworth, Irlam, Kingston-upon-Hull, Knaresborough, Litherland, Normanton, Ryde, Skipton, Stanley (Yrks), Tenby
1915	lxxxiii	Electric Lighting Orders Confirmation (No. 3) Act	Orders for Andover, Bosston, Chipstead, Connah's Quay, East Grinstead, Selby, Southampton, Street
1915	lxxxiv	Electric Lighting Orders Confirmation (No. 4) Act	Orders for Harrogate, Keithley, Teignmouth, Tunbridge Wells, Warrington, Ystradgynlais
1915	lxxxv	Electric Lighting Order Confirmation (No. 5) Act	
1916	xxiv	Electric Lighting Order Confirmation Act	Order for Church Stretton
1917	xxxi	Electric Lighting Orders Confirmation Act	Orders for Epsom, Featherstone, Garforth, Horbury, Otley, Penistone, Rawdon
1917	li	Richmond (Surrey) Electricity Supply Act 1918	
1918	vii	Brixham Gas and Electricity Act 1918	
1918	viii	Yorkshire Electric Power Act 1918	
1918	xxii	County of London Electric Supply Company's Act 1918	County of London Electric Supply Company
1918	xxx	Electric Lighting Orders Confirmation Act	Orders for Newquay, Wednesbury
1918	xliii	Shropshire, Worcestershire and Staffordshire Electric Power Act 1918	
1918	xlviii	Clyde Valley Electrical Power Order Confirmation Act 1918	
1919	lxxii	Electric Lighting Order Confirmation Act	Order for Chepstow
1919	xcvii	Clyde Valley Electrical Power Order Confirmation Act 1919	
1919	cxxi	Shropshire, Worcestershire and Staffordshire Electric Power Act 1919	
=== 1920 – 1924 ===
1920	vi	South Wales Electrical Power Distribution Company Act 1920	
1920	xxv	North Metropolitan Electric Power Supply Act 1920	
1921	cxiv	County of London Electric Supply Company's Act 1921	County of London Electric Supply Company
1922	xxiii	Yorkshire Electric Power Act 1922	
1922	lxvii	South Wales Electrical Power Distribution Company Act 1922	
1922	lxxvii	North Metropolitan Electric Power Supply Act 1922	
1922	lxxix	Grampian Electricity Supply Act 1922	
1923	xxv	Oakham Gas and Electricity Act 1923	
1923	ciii	London Electric Railway Act 1923	
1924	lii	Grampian Electricity Supply Act 1924	
=== 1925 – 1929 ===
1925	xcii	Clyde Valley Electrical Power Act 1925	
1925	xciii	Lanarkshire Hydro-Electric Power Act 1925	
1926	ix	Ascot District Gas and Electricity Act 1926	
1926	xv	Ayrshire Electricity Order Confirmation Act 1926	
1926	xxxiv	Leicestershire and Warwickshire Electric Power Act 1926	
1926	lxxiii	Kidderminster and Stourport Electric Tramway Act 1926	
1926	ciii	Shropshire, Worcestershire and Staffordshire Electric Power Act 1926	
1927	vii	Farnham Gas and Electricity Act 1927	
1927	xix	North Metropolitan Electric Power Supply Act 1927	
1927	xxv	Yorkshire Electric Power Act 1927	
1927	lxvi	Bognor Gas and Electricity Act 1927	
1927	lxxii	Wessex Electricity Act 1927	
1927	c	East Anglian Electricity Act 1927	
1927	cvii	County of London Electric Supply Company's Act 1927	County of London Electric Supply Company
1927	cix	London and Home Counties Joint Electricity Authority Act 1927	
1927	cxvii	Grampian Electricity Supply Order Confirmation Act 1927	
1928	cxiii	Weald Electricity Supply Company Act 1928	
1928	cxv	Cleveland and Durham County Electric Power Act 1928	
1928	cxviii	North Metropolitan Electric Power Supply (Consolidation) Act 1928	
1929	xi	Lancashire Electric Power Act 1929	
=== 1930 – 1939 ===
1930	Iii	Grampian Electricity Supply Order Confirmation Act 1930	
1930	lxx	Scottish Central Electric Power Act 1930	
1930	cxxiv	Fife Electric Power Act 1930	
1930	cxxvii	Sidmouth Electricity Act 1930	
1930	clxiv	Ascot District Gas and Electricity Act 1930	
1930	clxv	Brixham Gas and Electricity Act 1930	
1930	clxxxix	Shropshire, Worcestershire and Staffordshire Electric Power Act 1930	
1931	xxviii	Guildford Gas and Cranleigh Electricity Act 1931	
1932	xii	South Wales Electric Power Act 1932	
1932	xxxii	North-Eastern Electric Supply Act 1932	
1932	lxv	North Metropolitan Electric Power Supply Act 1932	
1932	lxv	Oakham Gas and Electricity Act 1932	
1932	lxxxix	Bournemouth, Poole and Christchurch Electricity Act 1932	
1933	liv	Grampian Electricity Supply Order Confirmation Act 1933	
1934	lxxvii	North Wales Electric Power Act 1934	
1934	lxxxiii	Clyde Valley Electricity Power Order Confirmation Act 1934	
1934	lxxxvi	Falkirk Electricity Order Confirmation Act 1934	
1935	xxii	Folkestone and District Electricity Act 1935	
1935	xxv	Norwich Electric Tramways Act 1935	
1935	lxxxi	Bognor Gas and Electricity Act 1935	
1935	xcviii	Ascot District Gas and Electricity Act 1935	
1936	xxii	Grampian Electricity Supply Order Confirmation Act 1936	
1936	xxxi	Yorkshire Electric Power Act 1936	
1936	xl	North Wales Electric Power Act 1936	
1936	liv	Cornwall Electric Power Act 1936	
1936	lxi	North Metropolitan Electric Power Supply Act 1936	
1936	lxii	Colne Valley and Northwood Electricity Act 1036	
1937	xl	North Metropolitan Electric Power Supply Act 1937	
1937	lxv	Kent Electric Power Act 1937	
1937	lxviii	Wessex Electricity Act 1937	
1937	lxxix	Lancashire Electric Power Act 1937	
1937	xcix	Clyde Valley Electrical Power Order Confirmation Act 1937	
1938	xiii	North West Midlands Joint Electricity Authority Order Confirmation Act 1946	
1938	xxvi	Brixham Gas and Electricity Act 1938	
1938	lviii	Shropshire, Worcestershire and Staffordshire Electric Power Consolidation Act 1938	
1939	lii	North-West Midlands Joint Electricity Authority Order Confirmation Act 1939	
1939	lv	Bognor and District Gas and Electricity Act 1939	
1939	xciii	Motherwell and Wishaw Electricity, &c. Order Confirmation Act 1939	
=== 1940 – 1948 ===
1940	xii	Wessex Electricity Act 1940	
1940	xxi	Cornwall Electric Power Act 1940	
1940	xxix	Farnham Gas and Electricity Act 1940	
1942	xiii	South Wales Electric Power Act 1942	
1944	ix	North-West Midlands Joint Electricity Authority Order Confirmation Act 1944	
1946	xix	North West Midlands Joint Electricity Authority Order Confirmation Act 1946	
1946	xxxv	West Midlands Joint Electricity Authority Order Confirmation Act 1946	
1948	xlviii	St. Helens Corporation (Electricity and General Powers) Act 1946	

== See also ==
- Energy policy of the United Kingdom
- Energy use and conservation in the United Kingdom
- Energy switching services in the UK
- UK enterprise law
- Electric or Electricity Act

== Sources ==
- Cochrane, R.; Schaefer, M. (1990). The CEGB Story. London: CEGB.
- Duncan, Ben (1996). "Public Service Obligations in a Competitive Electricity Market" (Microsoft Word document).
- "Gas and Electricity Act 1968", legislation.gov.uk, The National Archives, 3 July 1968, 1968 c. 39
- "Electricity Act 1989", legislation.gov.uk, The National Archives, 27 July 1989, 1989 c. 29
- Electricity Supply in the United Kingdom: A Chronology. London: Electricity Council. 1987. ISBN 085188105X.
- Eyles, William E. (December 2005). "Electricity in Bath 1890 – 1974" (PDF). Histelec News (Supplement 31). South Western Electricity Historical Society. — explains the 1882 Act
- Hannah, Leslie (1979). Electricity Before Nationalisation, A Study in the Development of the Electricity Supply Industry in Britain to 1948. London & Basingstoke: Macmillan Publishers for the Electricity Council. ISBN 0-8018-2145-2.
- Hannah, Leslie (1982). Engineers, Managers and Politicians. London: Macmillan. ISBN 0333220870.
- Luckin, Bill (1990). Questions of Power: Electricity and the Environment in Inter-war Britain. Manchester: Manchester University Press. ISBN 9780719033025.
- Pedroche, Ben (2013). London's Lost Power Stations and Gasworks. Stroud: The History Press. ISBN 9780752487618.
- Sheail, John (1991). Power in Trust: The Environmental History of the Central Electricity Generating Board. Oxford: Clarendon. ISBN 0198546734.
- "UK Electricity Networks" (PDF). Parliamentary Office of Science and Technology. 2001. Archived from the original (PDF) on 2006-05-19. — "Postnote" 163
