= Cleveland and Durham County Electric Power Company =

UK electric company

- Type: Public company
- Industry: Electricity generation and supply
- Founded: 1901
- Defunct: 1933
- Fate: Reorganisation
- Successor: Cleveland and Durham Electric Power Limited
- Area served: Tees district and south and west County Durham,
- Services: Electricity generation and supply

The Cleveland and Durham County Electric Power Company supplied electricity to the Tees district and to south and west County Durham, England. It generated and supplied electricity from 1904, merged with Newcastle-upon-Tyne Electric Supply Company in 1917 and was dissolved in 1933.

See below for Cleveland and Durham Electric Power Limited.

== History ==
Cleveland and Durham County Electric Power Act 1901
- Act of Parliament
- Parliament of the United Kingdom
- Long title: An Act for incorporating and conferring powers on the Cleveland and Durham County Electric Power Company.
- Citation: 1 Edw. 7. c. civ

Dates
- Royal assent: 26 July 1901

Cleveland and Durham County Electric Power Act 1903
- Act of Parliament
- Parliament of the United Kingdom
- Long title: An Act to confer further powers upon the Cleveland and Durham County Electric Power Company and for other purposes.
- Citation: 3 Edw. 7. c. xxv

Dates
- Royal assent: 30 June 1903

Text of statute as originally enacted

Cleveland and Durham County Electric Power Act 1913
- Act of Parliament
- Parliament of the United Kingdom
- Long title: An Act to confer further powers upon the Cleveland and Durham County Electric Power Company and for other purposes.
- Citation: 3 & 4 Geo. 5. c. v

Dates
- Royal assent: 4 July 1913

Text of statute as originally enacted

Cleveland and Durham County Electric Power Act 1928
- Act of Parliament
- Parliament of the United Kingdom
- Long title: An Act to confer powers upon the Cleveland and Durham County Electric Power Company with reference to the supply of electricity in parts of the east north and west ridings of York and in the city of York and part of the county of Durham and further powers with reference to such supply in their existing area of supply and for other purposes.
- Citation: 18 & 19 Geo. 5. c. cxv

Dates
- Royal assent: 3 August 1928

Text of statute as originally enacted

The Cleveland and Durham County Electric Power Company was established in 1901 under the provisions of the Cleveland and Durham County Electric Power Act 1901 (1 Edw. 7. c. civ). Its powers, extended by the Cleveland and Durham County Electric Power Act 1903 (3 Edw. 7. c. xxv), were to generate or acquire electricity and provide electricity for lighting and power purposes for users. The area of supply covered 820 square miles. By 1915 the company operated a generating station at Grangetown, Middlesbrough. This had a capacity of 6,000 kW. Energy was also supplied by waste heat stations at Newport, Weardale, Teesbridge, Port Clarence, and Ayresome. It also had agreements to exchange electricity with the Newcastle-upon-Tyne Electric Supply Company (NESCo) and County of Durham Electric Power Supply Company.

=== Directors ===
The directors in 1915 were:

- James Falconer (chair)
- R. W. Armstrong
- Maurice Lowthian Bell
- Robert James
- Philip E. Noble
- C. P. F. Pierret

=== Operations ===
The profits of the company were: £24,360 (1907); £38, 960 (1908); £52,800 (1909).

In 1922 the power station at Grangetown had boilers supplying 290,000 lb/hour of steam to drive four alternators as follows:

1 × 2 MW, 1 × 2.4 MW, 2 × 6.6 MW. Total generating capacity was 17.6 MW.

The company was dissolved in 1933 under the provisions of the North-Eastern Electric Supply Act 1932 (22 & 23 Geo. 5. c. xxxii).

== Cleveland and Durham Electric Power Limited ==
Cleveland and Durham Electric Power Limited
- Founded: 1906
- Defunct: 1932
- Successor: Newcastle-upon-Tyne Electric Supply Company

Cleveland and Durham Electric Power Limited was registered on 18 July 1906. It was formed to acquire shares of the Cleveland and Durham County Electric Power Company and those of the Northern Counties Electricity Supply Company Limited. Its remit was to develop electric power in County Durham, Cleveland and parts of Northumberland.

In order to provide the finance, the company offered £1,000,000 share capital in July 1906.

The company was in financial difficulties and decided to take an electricity supply from the NESCo's Carville power station via a cable under the Tyne at Hebburn.

In 1915 the company had 486 consumers. The number of connections were 36,283 (1910); 40,460 (1911); 48,429 (1912); 55,133 (1913).

=== Directors ===
The directors were:

- John Hobart Armstrong
- Maurice Lowthian Bell
- Charles Emmott
- James Falconer
- Robert James
- John Davison Milburn

The Cleveland and Durham Company's share capital was fully acquired by NESCo in 1917.

The company was dissolved on 30 September 1932.

== See also ==
- List of pre-nationalisation UK electric power companies
