= Shropshire, Worcestershire and Staffordshire Electric Power Company =

- Formerly: Shropshire and Worcestershire Electric Power Company
- Type: Public limited company
- Industry: Energy: electricity generation and supply
- Founded: 1903
- Defunct: 31 March 1948
- Fate: Dissolved by nationalisation
- Successor: British Electricity Authority and Midlands Electricity Board
- Headquarters: London
- Area served: Shropshire, Worcestershire, Staffordshire, Herefordshire, Gloucestershire, Oxfordshire and South Wales
- Key people: see text
- Services: Electricity supply
- Owner: Edmundsons Electricity Corporation

The Shropshire, Worcestershire and Staffordshire Electric Power Company was an electricity generating and supply organisation that operated in the West Midlands and South Wales. It was established in 1903 and was dissolved as a consequence of the nationalisation of the British electricity supply industry in 1948.

== History ==
Shropshire and Worcestershire Electric Power Act 1903
- Act of Parliament
- Parliament of the United Kingdom
- Long title: An Act for incorporating and conferring powers on the Shropshire and Worcestershire Electric Power Company.
- Citation: 3 Edw. 7. c. ccxxxvii

Dates
- Royal assent: 14 August 1903

Other legislation
- Repealed by: Shropshire, Worcestershire and Staffordshire Electric Power (Consolidation) Act 1938

Status: Repealed

Text of statute as originally enacted

Shropshire, Worcestershire and Staffordshire Electric Power Act 1905
- Act of Parliament
- Parliament of the United Kingdom
- Long title: An Act to confer further powers upon the Shropshire Worcestershire and Staffordshire Electric Power Company and for other purposes.
- Citation: 5 Edw. 7. c. clx

Dates
- Royal assent: 4 August 1905

Other legislation
- Repealed by: Shropshire, Worcestershire and Staffordshire Electric Power (Consolidation) Act 1938

Status: Repealed

Text of statute as originally enacted

Shropshire, Worcestershire and Staffordshire Electric Power Act 1906
- Act of Parliament
- Parliament of the United Kingdom
- Long title: An Act to confer further powers upon the Shropshire Worcestershire and Staffordshire Electric Power Company and for other purposes.
- Citation: 6 Edw. 7. c. clxxxv

Dates
- Royal assent: 4 August 1906

Other legislation
- Repealed by: Shropshire, Worcestershire and Staffordshire Electric Power (Consolidation) Act 1938

Status: Repealed

Shropshire, Worcestershire and Staffordshire Electric Power Act 1914
- Act of Parliament
- Parliament of the United Kingdom
- Long title: An Act to confer further powers upon the Shropshire Worcestershire and Staffordshire Electric Power Company and for other purposes.
- Citation: 4 & 5 Geo. 5. c. lxxxiv

Dates
- Royal assent: 31 July 1914

Other legislation
- Repealed by: Shropshire, Worcestershire and Staffordshire Electric Power (Consolidation) Act 1938

Status: Repealed

Text of statute as originally enacted

Shropshire, Worcestershire and Staffordshire Electric Power Act 1916
- Act of Parliament
- Parliament of the United Kingdom
- Long title: An Act to confer further powers upon the Shropshire Worcestershire and Staffordshire Electric Power Company and for other purposes.
- Citation: 6 & 7 Geo. 5. c. li

Dates
- Royal assent: 23 August 1916

Other legislation
- Repealed by: Shropshire, Worcestershire and Staffordshire Electric Power (Consolidation) Act 1938

Status: Repealed

Text of statute as originally enacted

Shropshire Worcestershire and Staffordshire Electric Power Act 1918
- Act of Parliament
- Parliament of the United Kingdom
- Long title: An Act to confer further powers upon the Shropshire, Worcestershire and Staffordshire Electric Power Company and for other purposes.
- Citation: 8 & 9 Geo. 5. c. xliii

Dates
- Royal assent: 8 August 1918

Other legislation
- Repealed by: Shropshire, Worcestershire and Staffordshire Electric Power (Consolidation) Act 1938

Status: Repealed

Text of statute as originally enacted

Shropshire, Worcestershire and Staffordshire Electric Power Act 1919
- Act of Parliament
- Parliament of the United Kingdom
- Long title: An Act to empower the Shropshire Worcestershire and Staffordshire Electric Power Company to raise additional capital and for other purposes.
- Citation: 9 & 10 Geo. 5. c. cxxi

Dates
- Royal assent: 23 December 1919

Other legislation
- Repealed by: Shropshire, Worcestershire and Staffordshire Electric Power (Consolidation) Act 1938

Status: Repealed

Shropshire, Worcestershire and Staffordshire Electric Power Act 1923
- Act of Parliament
- Parliament of the United Kingdom
- Long title: An Act to confer further powers upon the Shropshire Worcestershire and Staffordshire Electric Power Company to make further provisions with reference to the separate undertaking of that Company and for other purposes.
- Citation: 13 & 14 Geo. 5. c. xcvi

Dates
- Royal assent: 2 August 1923

Other legislation
- Repealed by: Shropshire, Worcestershire and Staffordshire Electric Power (Consolidation) Act 1938

Status: Repealed

Text of statute as originally enacted

Shropshire, Worcestershire and Staffordshire Electric Power Act 1930
- Act of Parliament
- Parliament of the United Kingdom
- Long title: An Act to confer further powers upon the Shropshire Worcestershire and Staffordshire Electric Power Company and for other purposes.
- Citation: 21 & 22 Geo. 5. c. clxxxix

Dates
- Royal assent: 1 August 1930

Other legislation
- Repealed by: Shropshire, Worcestershire and Staffordshire Electric Power (Consolidation) Act 1938

Status: Repealed

Text of statute as originally enacted

Shropshire, Worcestershire and Staffordshire Electric Power (Consolidation) Act 1938
- Act of Parliament
- Parliament of the United Kingdom
- Long title: An Act to consolidate the Shropshire Worcestershire and Staffordshire Electric Power Acts and Orders 1903 to 1933
- Citation: 1 & 2 Geo. 6. c. lviii

Dates
- Royal assent: 13 July 1938

The Shropshire and Worcestershire Electric Power Company was established in 1903 under the terms of the Shropshire and Worcestershire Electric Power Act 1903 (3 Edw. 7. c. ccxxxvii). Further acts were obtained; the Shropshire, Worcestershire and Staffordshire Electric Power Act 1905 (5 Edw. 7. c. clx), the Shropshire, Worcestershire and Staffordshire Electric Power Act 1906 (6 Edw. 7. c. clxxxv), the Shropshire, Worcestershire and Staffordshire Electric Power Act 1914 (4 & 5 Geo. 5. c. lxxxiv), the Shropshire, Worcestershire and Staffordshire Electric Power Act 1916 (6 & 7 Geo. 5. c. li), the Shropshire Worcestershire and Staffordshire Electric Power Act 1918 (8 & 9 Geo. 5. c. xliii) and the Shropshire, Worcestershire and Staffordshire Electric Power Act 1923 (13 & 14 Geo. 5. c. xcvi). The name was changed to include Staffordshire in 1905. The company's aim was to supply electrical energy to authorised undertakings and to others requiring a supply of power. Its area of supply included Shropshire, Worcestershire and part of Staffordshire. This was later extended by acquisitions to include Herefordshire, Gloucestershire and Oxfordshire.

The company intended to build its own generating stations but initially purchased the existing stations of smaller electricity undertakings. These included the following (with the original owner, construction and purchase dates):

- Smethwick power station, Birmingham and Midland Tramways Limited, built 1904, purchased 1908, closed 1949
- Dudley power station, Dudley Corporation, built 1899, purchased 1914, closed late 1930s
- Kidderminster power station, Kidderminster and District Electric Lighting and Traction Company Limited, built 1898, purchased 1919, closed late 1920s
- Redditch power station, Redditch Urban District Council, built 1900, purchased 1924, closed early 1930s
- Hereford power station, Hereford Corporation, built 1899, purchased 1929, closed 1939

=== Stourport power station ===
During the First World War the two major undertakings in the Midlands, the Shropshire Company and the Birmingham Corporation, proposed to build two large power stations to meet their joint needs. These would be the 30 MW Nechells power stations and the 45 MW Stourport power station. However, the proposal failed on the question of financing. The Shropshire Company eventually built Stourport power station which was commissioned in 1927. This enabled the smaller, less efficient, stations at Dudley, Kidderminster and Redditch to be closed.

=== Developments in the 1930s ===
The Shropshire Company became part of the Edmundsons Electricity Corporation which by 1931 was itself part of the Greater London and Counties Trust.

The Shropshire Company continued to purchase, or obtain a controlling interest in, further electricity undertakings and closed the power stations as a bulk supply was available from its network. These included the smaller power stations at:

- Blockley power station, Blockley Electric Lighting and Manufacturing Company, built 1888, purchased 1931, closed ‘soon after’
- Church Stretton power station, Church Stretton Electric Supply Company Limited, built 1904, purchased 1929, closed ‘soon after’
- Fladbury power station, Fladbury Electric Light and Power Company Limited, built 1900, purchased 1925, closed 1925
- Ledbury power station, Ledbury Electric Supply Company Limited, built 1913, purchased 1930, closed 1930
- Ludlow power station, Ludlow Electric Light Company Limited, built 1906, purchased 1927, closed 1929
- Ross-on-Wye power station, Ross Electric Light and Power Company Limited, built 1902, purchased 1930s
- Tewkesbury power station, Tewkesbury Electric Light Company Limited, built 1909, purchased 1930s

In addition to the above towns the company supplied electricity to Bewdley, Bromsgrove, Droitwich, Evesham, Halesowen and Oldbury.

In 1937 the company purchased a majority shareholding in the South Wales Electric Power Company.

=== Nationalisation ===
The Shropshire, Worcestershire and Staffordshire Electric Power Company was abolished on 31 March 1948 under the terms of the Electricity Act 1947 which nationalised the British electricity supply industry. The company's power stations and electricity transmission systems were vested in the British Electricity Authority. The local distribution systems and the electricity sales functions were vested in the Midlands Electricity Board (MEB).

=== Key people ===
The chairmen of the company included:

- William Leonard Madgen 1921
- Emile Garcke 1923–30
- F. Massingberd Rogers 1930–33
- Sir Holberry Mensforth 1933–36
- Brigadier-General Wade H. Hayes 1936
- Sir Thomas Royden 1936–43

The directors of the company in 1921 were:

- William Leonard Madgen (chairman and managing director)
- Clarence Shirreff Hilton
- Emile Garcke
- James Albert Lycett
- Brenchley Barrett Kingsford

The registered office was at 88 Kingsway, London.

== Generating plant ==
Technical details of the Shropshire Company's power stations, and later constituent power stations, were as follows:

Shropshire Electric Company power stations in 1923
| Power station | Generating plant type | AC capacity, kW | DC capacity, kW | Maximum load, kW | Connected load, kW | Load factor % |
Shropshire, Worcestershire and Staffordshire Electric Power Company power stations
| Dudley | Steam turbines and engines | 2,000 | 900 | 21,730 | 61,239 | 25.8 |
| Kidderminster | Steam turbines and engines | 1,500 | 1,100 | 21,730 | 61,239 | 25.8 |
| Smethwick | Steam turbines and engines | 30,625 | 1,000 | 21,730 | 61,239 | 25.8 |
Future constituent power stations
| Redditch | Steam turbines and engines | 4,460 | – | 1,740 | 4,010 | 23.1 |
| Church Stretton | Gas engine | – | 100 | 50 | 333 | 23.2 |
| Ledbury | Gas and oil engines | – | 70 | 53 | 113 | 14.2 |
| Ludlow | Gas engines and hydro | – | 110 | 73 | 300 | 12.9 |
| Ross-on-Wye | Steam engine and gas engine | – | 90 | 69 | 274 | 13.2 |
| Tewkesbury | Gas and oil engines | – | 85 | 61 | 180 | 25.5 |

By 1946 the Shropshire Company operated only Stourport A power station. The details for 1946 were:

- Generating capacity: 182.25 MW
- Electricity sold: 714,526 MWh
- Maximum load: 178,164 kW
- Load factor: 45.8%
- Thermal efficiency: 22.34%

Following nationalisation the British Electricity Authority built Stourport B station (1950–54).This had a generating capacity of 120 MW.

== Operations ==
The growth of the Shropshire Company's business is shown in the general trend of an increase in the amount of electricity sold and the connected load.

| Year | Electricity sold, MWh | Connected load, kW |
|---|---|---|
| 1914 | 14,474 | – |
| 1915 | 20,798 | – |
| 1916 | 44,615 | – |
| 1917 | 55,678 | – |
| 1918 | 62,260 | – |
| 1919 | 33,273 | 45,326 |
| 1920 | 54,486 | 49,957 |
| 1921 | 54,496 | 58,557 |
| 1922 | 34,511 | 61,240 |
| 1923 | 37,563 | 68,967 |
| 1931 | 193,431 | – |
| 1936 | 234,900 | – |
| 1946 | 714,526 | 178,164 |

The combined electricity output from Dudley, Kidderminster and Smethwick power stations was used for the following purposes:

Electricity use 1921–23
| Electricity Use | Units | Year | | |
| Electricity Use | Units | 1921 | 1922 | 1923 |
|---|---|---|---|---|
| Lighting and domestic | MWh | 1,039 | 1,192 | 1,418 |
| Public lighting | MWh | 47 | 45 | 49 |
| Traction | MWh | 4,688 | 4,317 | 4,224 |
| Power | MWh | 42,124 | 22,780 | 29,243 |
| Bulk supply | MWh | 6,598 | 6,176 | 2,629 |
| Total use | MWh | 54,496 | 34,511 | 37,583 |

The amount of electricity generated and the revenue from sales in 1923 were as shown:

Electricity generated and revenue 1923
| Power station | Electricity generated, MWh | Revenue from sales of electricity | Surplus of revenue over costs |
|---|---|---|---|
| Dudley, Kidderminster and Smethwick | 49,211 | £233,341 | £10,375 |
| Redditch | 3,533 | £23,637 | £8,442 |
| Church Stretton | 101.7 | £2,405 | £1,547 |
| Ledbury | 66.3 | £1,580 | £470 |
| Ludlow | 82.7 | £2,752 | £1,295 |
| Ross-on-Wye | 80.1 | £2,308 | £281 |
| Tewkesbury | 114.2 | £2,419 | £488 |

== See also ==
List of pre-nationalisation UK electric power companies

Timeline of the UK electricity supply industry

List of power stations in England
