= Neptune Bank Power Station =

Power station in Wallsend, Tyne and Wear, England

- Country: United Kingdom
- Location: Wallsend
- Coordinates: 54.985°N 1.536°W
- Status: Decommissioned
- Construction began: 1900
- Commission date: 18 June 1901
- Decommission date: 1915
- Owner: Newcastle upon Tyne Electric Supply Company

Thermal power station
- Primary fuel: Coal

Power generation
- Make and model: Parsons
- Units decommissioned: 9
- Nameplate capacity: 2,800 kW (1901); 3,000 kW (1902)

Neptune Bank Power Station was a coal-fired power station situated on the River Tyne at Wallsend near Newcastle upon Tyne. Commissioned in 1901 by the Newcastle upon Tyne Electric Supply Company, the station was the first in the world to provide electricity for purposes other than domestic and street lighting. It was also the first in the world to generate electricity using three-phase electrical power distribution at a voltage of 5,500 volts.

The station had an initial generating capacity of 2,800 kW, which was increased to 3,000 kW a year after the station opened, with the introduction of two 1,500 kW Parsons turbo alternators, the largest ever built at that time. The station closed in 1915, following the completion of an extension to Carville Power Station and the opening of Dunston Power Station.

== History ==
At the beginning of the twentieth century, the use of electricity for general purposes began to be considered, and the Newcastle upon Tyne Electric Supply Company (NESCo) realised the potential it offered for development. In June 1899, the Walker and Wallsend Union Gas Company (WWUGC) acquired legal powers in an act of Parliament for the supply of electricity to the area around Wallsend. In January 1900 they erected Neptune Bank power station near the North Eastern Railway's (NER) North Tyneside Loop, midway between Wallsend and Walker. In October 1900, NESCo acquired the entire power station from the WWUGC, with the exception of the cables and sub-station machinery installed for the purpose of supplying the works in the area in which the WWUGC had obtained legal powers. the WWUGC continued to buy electricity in bulk from NESCo.

The station was officially opened on 18 June 1901 by Lord Kelvin. At the opening he said:

We have seen at work what many have not seen before – a system realised in which a central station generates power by steam engines and delivers electricity to consumers at distances varying, I think, from a quarter of a mile to over three and a half miles... A larger station is in prospect, larger work is contemplated. This admirable but comparatively small station at Neptune Bank makes a splendid beginning... What I am seeing today is the dream of my life realised. I do not know the limits of electricity, but it will go beyond anything we can conceive of today.

The station was the first power station to generate electricity for industrial purposes, rather than just for domestic and street lighting, and this led to a rapid expansion of NESCo.

NESCo laid high-tension cables from the power station to various substations in Newcastle upon Tyne. The company changed their system of supply, from 2,000 volt (V) single phase alternating current which had been used to distribute power from their Pandon Dene Power Station, to three phase current at 5,500 V. This made NESCo the first statutory authority to supply in such a way. The scientific journal, The Electrician congratulated NESCo in June 1901, stating that "not merely electric power supply on Tyneside was formally inaugurated last Tuesday, but the era of electric power utilisation all over the kingdom."

A year after the station came into operation, NESCo's original power station at Pandon Dene was closed and converted into a substation. The Pandon Dene station had originally supplied Newcastle city centre with electricity, but the new Neptune Bank station took over this supply, transmitting using high voltage cables laid in ducts, rendering the older station obsolete.

== Design and specification ==
The station was the first major design project of Charles Merz, of the Merz & McLellan consulting partnership, and the first power station Merz & McLellan designed in the Newcastle area.

The station's buildings were built from corrugated iron, and the boiler house adjoined the engine room on its south facing side. Each of these two buildings measured 100 ft (30 m) by 52 ft (16 m). To the north east of the main station buildings lay the station's cooling pond, where the station's circulating water was cooled by means of spray nozzles, capable of cooling 4,000,000 pounds of water per hour. This cooling system was adopted as it was cheaper than pumping water up from the nearby River Tyne which was 60 ft (18 m) below the level of the station. The station was also equipped with a testing pond, capable of absorbing up to 1,500 kW.

Coal was delivered to the station via the NER's North Tyneside Loop. An electric locomotive was used to convey the coal from the railway to the boiler house. The station's boiler house was equipped with four batteries of two Babcock & Wilcox boilers. Each boiler had a capacity of 1,000 horsepower and a working pressure of 200 psi. Each was fitted with superheaters and mechanical stokers and had a heating surface of 4,020 sq ft (373 m^{2}), with a superheat of 100–120 °F (38–49 °C). Each could evaporate 14,000 pounds of water per hour. Ash waste from the boilers was discharged into trucks.

The station initially generated electricity using four British Thomson-Houston 700 kilowatt (kW) 40 Hz alternators, each driven by a slow-speed triple expansion marine type reciprocating engine, one built by Wigham Richardson & Co. and three from Wallsend Slipway & Engineering Company. Steam for the engines was provided from eight Babcock & Wilcox 14,000 lb/hr boilers. There were also three smaller Bellis engines to provide local power two 300 HP and one at 75 HP to provide around 450 kW continuous current. The station was the first in the world to generate electricity using three-phase electrical power distribution at a voltage of 5,500 V, and the first to generate direct current at different voltages. After the opening of Carville Power Station in 1904, the voltage of transmission was raised to 6,000 V.

In 1902, two 1,500-kW Parsons steam turbine driven turbo-alternators were added to the initial equipment at the station. At the time, these were the largest three-phase steam turbine driven alternators in the world, as well as being the first of the barrel type rotary design. Results gained from the turbines influenced the Cunard Steamship Company to install steam turbines on the Mauretania. The turbines drove 6,600 V 40 hz three-phase alternators, supplying current to motor-generators and transformers in the substations attached to the distribution network. The motor-generators in the substations provided DC from the supplied AC and the transformers stepped-down the 6,600 V supply to 200 V for lighting use and 400 V for industrial use.

By 1904, there were a total of nine different generating sets operating at the power station. Sets No. 1 and 2 were DC generators driven by 300 HP two-crank compound engines running at 380 RPM, power from which supplied DC network in Wallsend and Walker. Set No. 3 was a 50 kW set used for exciting purposes only. Sets No. 4 and 5 were used as balancers and motor generators and had a combined capacity of 150 kW. Sets No. 6, 7, 8 and 9 were each driven by 1,400 HP engines and in turn each drove a 750 kW alternator. The two Parsons sets worked alongside these but were subsequently moved to Carville power stations.

By 1912, the NESCo system, which the station was part of, was the largest integrated power system in Europe.

== Operations ==
Coal was delivered to Neptune Bank from the Riverside Branch of the North Eastern Railway at Tyne Pontoons signal box, about halfway between Walker and Carville stations. It was taken to the station's railway sidings using a small electric locomotive and unloaded in front of the boiler house. It was then hand-loaded into automatic stokers which fired the boilers. Removal of ash from the boilers was performed by machine. The station was badly located for sources of cooling and boiler water – it was some 60 ft (18 m) above the level of the nearby River Tyne, which was also 200 feet away. The concept of a cooling tower had not yet been invented and a large but inefficient brick-built cooling pond was used.

== Closure ==
Following Neptune Bank's commissioning there was a rapid increase in the demand for electricity, which couldn't be met by the station, and so in 1904 NESCo commissioned Carville Power Station. Fitted entirely with steam turbine generating equipment, Carville quickly superseded Neptune Bank. Neptune Bank power station was largely out of use by 1909 after the extension of the Carville station, along with the opening of Dunston Power Station. It was decommissioned in 1915. The building was later acquired by the company Thermal Syndicate who used it as a glass blowing factory known as the Vitreosil Works.

Preceded by Deptford East Power Station	Largest Power Station in the UK; 1901-1904	Succeeded by Carville A Power Station
