= Carville power stations =

Two coal-fired power stations in England

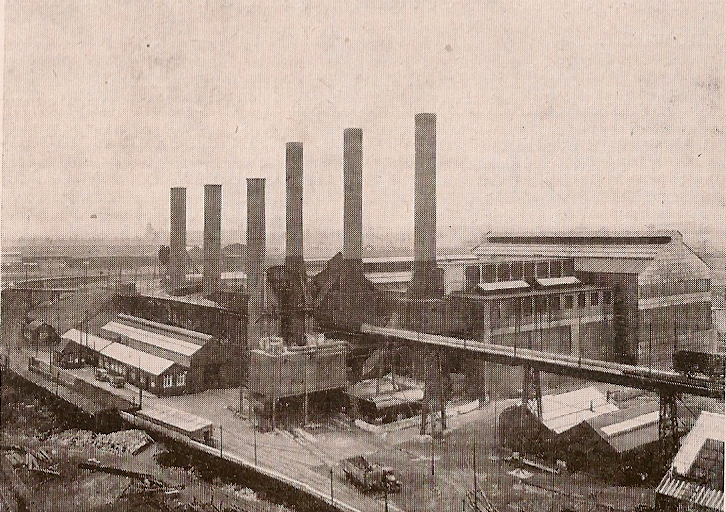
- Carville A (left) and B (right) power stations viewed in the 1930s
- Official name: Carville A and B power stations
- Country: England
- Location: Wallsend
- Coordinates: 54°59′20″N 1°31′30″W
- Commission date: 1904, 07 (A station); 1916 (B station)
- Decommission date: 1932 (A station); 1950s (B station)
- Owners: Newcastle-upon-Tyne Electric Supply Company; British Electricity Authority; Central Electricity Authority; Central Electricity Generating Board

Thermal power station
- Primary fuel: Coal

Power generation
- Units operational: A station: 2x 3.5 MW Parsons; 2x 1.5 MW Parsons; 3x 5 MW Parsons; B station: 5x 11 MW Parsons
- Nameplate capacity: 10 MW (A station 1904); 25 MW (A station 1907); 55 MW (B station 1916)

External links
- Commons: Related media on Commons

Carville Power Station refers to a pair of now partially demolished coal-fired power stations, situated in North East England on the north bank of the River Tyne at Wallsend. The two stations were built alongside each other on a riverside site about 5 mi (8.0 km) downstream of Newcastle upon Tyne. Carville A Power Station, the first station on the site was opened in 1904, and Carville B Power Station was opened in 1916 to its south.

The stations were a major factor in increasing the productivity of the neighbouring shipyards, which became some of the biggest in the world, as well as benefiting the nearby engineering works and coal mines by providing them with a cheap and reliable source of electricity. It also played a major role in enabling the electrification of the Tyneside railways and tramways.

The station's design set the pattern for power station layout and design for most of the early twentieth century, as it was the first in the world to use the "unit system" of layout, whereby each boiler and turbine generating set is directly connected electrically to an alternator, and can work independently from any other generating unit in the station. At various times the stations were the largest in the UK.

== Carville A Power Station ==
=== History ===
The Newcastle-upon-Tyne Electric Supply Company (NESCo) built their first power station at Pandon Dene in 1890. As electricity demand grew they moved their main generating site to Neptune Bank, near Wallsend in 1901. Once again, as demand grew, they ran out of space for further development at this site and so built another new generating station in the Carville area of Wallsend. The new station was built on a 15 acres (6.1 ha) site with frontage to the River Tyne. The Carville station was built so as to be available for very large extensions. It was opened in 1904, and at the time was the largest power station in the United Kingdom.

Prior to the First World War, the station was the site of NESCo's first control room for the efficient central control of their power stations and substations. The idea attracted considerable interest from power supply engineers from around the world, leading to it becoming common practice amongst all the large electricity authorities in England.

=== Design and specification ===
The station was designed by the British electrical engineering consultants, Merz & McLellan. The station's design set the pattern for power station layout and design for most of the early twentieth century, as it was the first in the world to use the "unit system" of layout, whereby each boiler and turbine generating set is directly connected electrically to an alternator, and can work independently from any other generating unit in the station. This system has remained popular throughout the twentieth century and into the twenty-first century. The station's boiler houses and turbine hall were of steel frame construction clad with corrugated iron, with the boiler houses built at right angles to the turbine hall. Each of the three boiler houses had its own chimney. This layout allowed for long lengths of steam-piping to be avoided, and for each battery of boilers to be arranged opposite the generating set which it feeds in the turbine hall.

Initially the station used two 4,000 kilowatt (kW) and two 2,000 kW (relocated from Neptune Bank Power Station) turbo-alternators, all produced by C. A. Parsons and Company and fitted with electric driven surface condenser pumps and auxiliary pumps. This gave the station a generating capacity of 12,000 kW. When built, the larger 4,000 kW units were double the capacity of any steam turbines that had been built up until that point, and were then tested to be operating at over 5,000 kW in 1907. By 1907 the station had installed 6 × 3,500 kW sets

Steam was provided by ten 1,000 HP Babcock & Wilcox 20,000 lb/hr coal fired marine type boilers and two Green's economizers. The station generated three-phase alternating current of 6 kV, which was distributed through NESCo's high voltage underground network.

The station was extended in 1907. An identical boiler house to the first was built and three 5,000 kW turbo-alternators were installed. This expansion brought the station's total generating capacity to 25,000 kW.

=== Operations ===
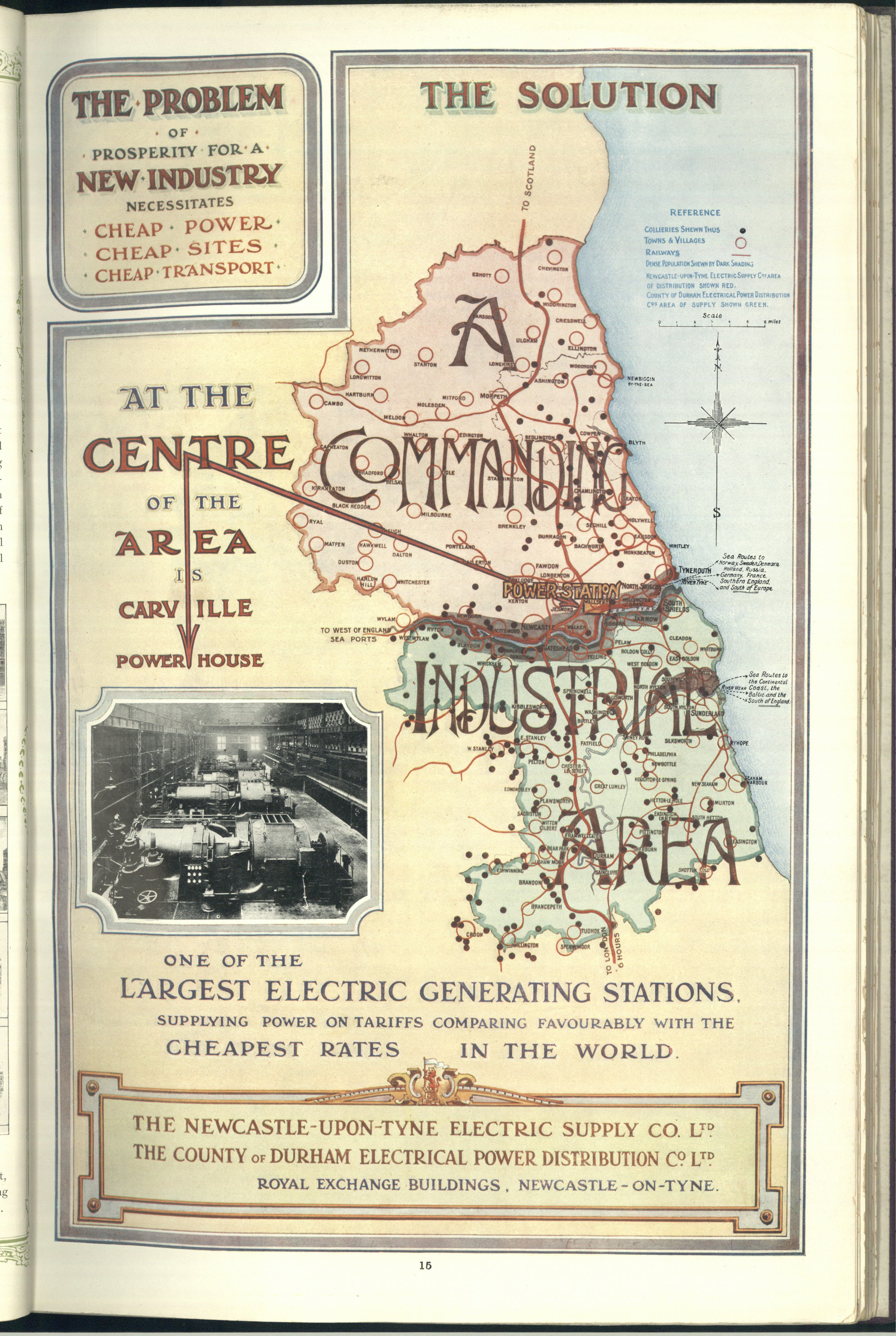
1908 Advert by Newcastle upon Tyne Electric Supply Company featuring Carville Power Station.

Coal burned in the station was delivered to the station's sidings on the Riverside Branch of the North Eastern Railway (NER). From the sidings the coal was carried over a steel trestle by an electric locomotive, before being unloaded directly into bunkers in the boiler house. From these bunkers the coal was conveyed to the stoker-hoppers by automatic weighing apparatus. The ash waste from the coal being burned discharged from the boilers by automatic doors to a conveyor, which emptied into an ash-bunker, from where empty coal-trucks could be filled.

Condensing water was taken directly from the front on River Tyne, where a pump house was constructed, fitted with electric driven pumps. Circulating water was taken from a combination of wells and mains water.

The first electricity produced by the station was provided to the NER for the electrification of their North Tyneside Loop, for the integration of the Tyneside Electrics. From the station, feeder cables ran to various substations to provide power for the railway, and these substations were interconnected with older substations for the supply of power and lighting to Newcastle upon Tyne, and power to the shipyards and other riverside manufactories of Tyneside.

Once the station was operating, NESCo were required to comply with terms agreed with the electrical undertakings in the north east part of County Durham to supply electricity for shipbuilding and other purposes on the south side of the River Tyne. A tunnel 6 feet (1.8 m) in diameter and at a depth of 120 feet (37 m) was driven underneath the River between the power station and Hebburn.

== Carville B Power Station ==
=== History ===
Following the various additions to the original Carville power station there was no space for a further increase in capacity, and so with a rising demand for electricity during the First World War, a new Carville "B" power station was erected adjacent to the original power station, which became known as the "A" power station. Carville B Power Station was completed and opened in 1916, and was considered to be the "first major generating station in the world", as it was distinct from substations.

=== Design and specification ===
The new power station employed five Parsons 11,000 kW turbo-alternators. The station was now equipped to supply power to over 60 square miles (160 km^{2}); from Shilbottle in Northumberland, right down to Malton in North Yorkshire. Carville B long held the record as the most economical power station in the world. The station took this record in 1914 when some of its units were completed, taking the record from Fisk Generating Station in Chicago, Illinois. Carville had an economy of only 10.05 lb of steam consumed per kilowatt hour generated when all five units were operating at full load. The pressure of the steam used in the station was at 275 psi, and at a temperature of 700 °F (371 °C); this was the highest steam pressure adopted by any electric supply company in England. The station used metal clad switchgear.

When the UK's national grid distribution system was brought into use in 1932, the station in common with all other NESCo-owned power stations had to be converted from the 40 hertz (Hz) frequency as used by the North Eastern grid system to the 50 Hz frequency used by the new national system.

== Closure ==
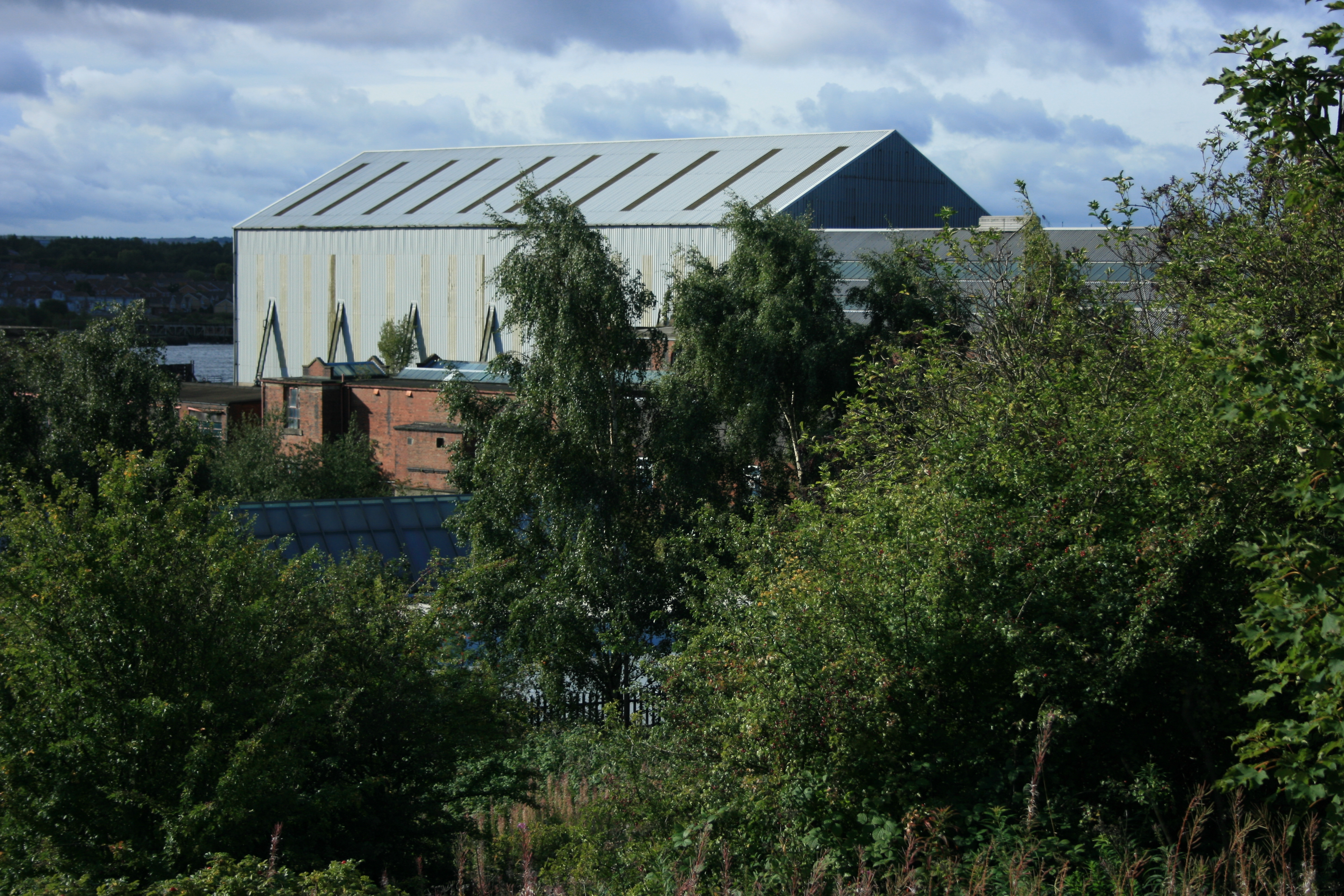
The remaining station buildings in September 2011

Carville A power station was closed in 1932 after the opening of Dunston B power station, although it had largely been out of use since 1926.

The B station was still in operation up to the early 1950s, and was decommissioned after the opening of the Stella North and Stella South power stations to the west of Newcastle upon Tyne. It was demolished in 1962 although the site remains in use for electrical purposes. The turbine hall has been retained and converted and is currently occupied by W D Close who work with NEDL to maintain the old infrastructure below the building because the tunnel under the river carrying cables floods.

Preceded by Neptune Bank Power Station	Largest Power Station in the UK; 1904–1905	Succeeded by Lots Road Power Station
Preceded by Lots Road Power Station	Largest Power Station in the UK; 1916–1925	Succeeded by Barking A Power Station
