= Pandon Dene Power Station =

Former power station in England

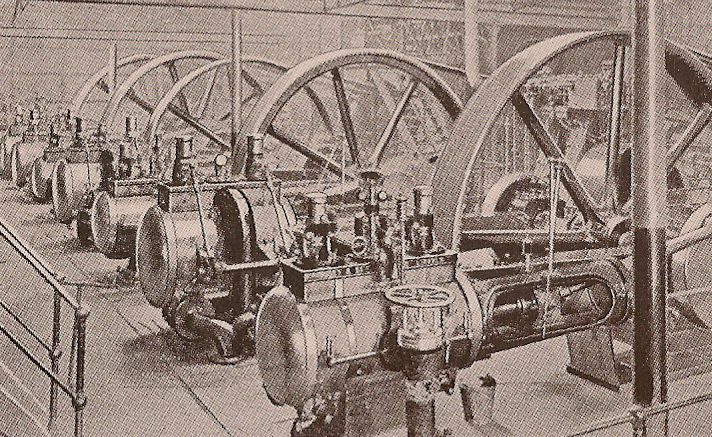
- The interior of Pandon Dene Power Station c.1890
- Country: England, United Kingdom
- Location: Tyne and Wear, North East England
- Coordinates: 54.969972°N 1.603206°W
- Status: Closed
- Commission date: 1889
- Decommission date: 1902
- Operator: Newcastle-upon-Tyne Electric Supply Company

Thermal power station
- Primary fuel: Coal

Power generation
- Nameplate capacity: 150 kW

Pandon Dene Power Station was an early coal-fired power station situated on the Pandon Dene, to the east of Newcastle upon Tyne.

== History ==
At the outset of their operations in 1889, the Newcastle-upon-Tyne Electric Supply Company (NESCo) were confined to operating within the eastern half of Newcastle. Their initial objective was to supply electricity for "4,500 ten candle-power lamps, of which 3,000 could be alight at one time." NESCo's first major step toward achieving this goal was the erection of their first power station, at Pandon Dene in the city's east end. The station was opened in 1890. Charles Merz worked at the station in 1892, prior to becoming a founder of his own electrical engineering consultancy Merz & McLellan.

== Design and specification ==
Upon opening, the station generated electricity using two 75 kilowatts (kW) Mordey Alternator's, each driven by a conventional Robey steam engine, meaning the alternators operated at a slow speed. This gave the station an initial generating capacity of 150 kW. The Mordey Generator could not operate in parallel and so each time load was transferred from one machine to another, supply would be interrupted and customers would notice a distinct flicker in the lights.

The station burned 2,700 tonnes of coal per year, all of which was delivered by horse and cart. The electricity generated was supplied almost entirely for lighting purposes, and was generated at a pressure of 2,000 Volts, and distributed using house-to-house transformers which reduced the pressure to 100 Volts. Later in the station's history, further generators were installed, the largest of which had a capacity of 500 kW.

== Closure ==
The station closed in 1902, following the opening of Neptune Bank Power Station in Wallsend, and was subsequently converted into a sub-station with motor-generators. The sub-station used four 800 kW rotary converters. It was one of five sub-stations which provided electricity for the North Eastern Railway's Riverside Branch.
