= L J Couves & Partners =

British architectural firm

- Type: Private
- Industry: Architectural firm
- Founded: 1923
- Headquarters: Newcastle upon Tyne, England

L. J. Couves and Partners were a British architectural firm from Newcastle upon Tyne in England.

== History ==
Between 1924 and 1928, the company worked under the lead architects Burnet, Tait and Lorne on the design of Carliol House, the headquarters of Newcastle upon Tyne Electric Supply Company. Then in 1930, the company designed the art-deco styled car park and garage, Dex Garage.

In the 1950s and 1960s, L J Couves and Partners were responsible for the design of a number of power stations in North East England. Power stations they designed included the Stella power stations, which were built between 1951 and 1957, and the Blyth power stations, built between 1955 and 1966. In 1955, the company were contracted to design the United Kingdom's second ever nuclear power station, Chapelcross nuclear power station at Annan in Scotland.

In 1980, the company designed Jesmond Metro station, for the Tyne and Wear Metro.
