= Teresa Merz =

English social worker and philanthropist (1879–1958)

- Born: 28 May 1879
- Died: 12 November 1958 (aged 79)

Teresa Merz (28 May 1879 – 12 November 1958) was an English social worker, philanthropist and magistrate.

== Early life ==
Merz was born in Gateshead. She was the third child, and only daughter, of industrial chemist John Theodore Merz (a Quaker from Germany) and Alice Mary Richardson, a sister of John Wigham Richardson, the Tyneside ship builder. Merz grew up in Newcastle's West End.

In 1896 she studied at Durham College of Science in Newcastle. In 1903 Merz won the Gladstone Prize for an essay on early Whig politicians; this work was later published as The Junto. In October 1904 Merz was admitted to Newnham College, Cambridge, where she studied philosophy, history and economics for one year.

== Career ==
After leaving Newnham, Merz worked with the Charity Organisation Society in Newcastle and was later appointed its secretary. In June 1914 Merz helped to organise a national conference, which brought together 400 delegates from different welfare organisations. Merz was involved in the women's suffrage movement and in June 1911 she took part in the Women’s Suffrage coronation procession.

In 1912, Merz opened Hope House in Newcastle. This lodging house provided accommodation for 11 women and girls.

=== First World War ===
During the World War I, Merz helped to establish Newcastle's local war relief fund. Merz also helped to run a nursery in the West End of Newcastle for babies whose mothers worked in local factories.

In December 1916, Merz joined a group of local Quakers in signing a notice in the Newcastle Journal which called for a negotiated peace.

Merz spent part of the war in Serbia where she provided relief work. She was later awarded the Medal of Merit by the Crown Prince of Serbia.

=== Inter-war years ===
In 1920, Merz left the Quaker movement and joined the Church of England. In 1921 Merz was appointed as a magistrate and would become the second longest-serving magistrate in the Newcastle.

Merz helped to open The Boys’ Migration Hostel in Newcastle. The hostel opened in June 1927 and aimed to prepare young men for farm work in the Dominions. The following year Merz was awarded an OBE for her involvement in the Hostel.

In 1928, Merz opened a second hostel which trained spinsters and childless widows, aged 18 to 35, in domestic work with a view to sending them to the Dominions.

In 1929, Merz helped to establish the Tyneside Council of Social Services and served as its first Vice President. In 1934 the Council established a women’s section which was chaired by Merz. This group organised social activities and "make and mend" classes in women's clubs.

In 1933, Merz converted the family home into a residential nursery for illegitimate babies and toddlers. In September 1939 the staff and children were evacuated to a family property, Heugh Folds, in Grasmere. A month later, Merz wrote to the Newcastle Evening Chronicle and encouraged other mothers to evacuate their children to the Lake District.

== Death ==
Merz died at home on 12 November 1958. She had continued to work until two days before her death.

== Publications ==
- The Junto. Newcastle-upon-Tyne, Andrew Reid and Company, Ltd. 1907.
