= North Eastern Electric Supply Company =

- Company type: Private
- Industry: Electricity supply
- Predecessor: Cleveland & Durham Electric Power Company; Northern Counties Electricity Supply Company; Tees Power Station Company
- Founded: Newcastle upon Tyne, UK (1889) as the Newcastle upon Tyne Electric Supply Company
- Founder: John Theodore Merz
- Defunct: 1 April 1948
- Fate: Nationalised
- Successor: North Eastern Electricity Board
- Headquarters: Newcastle upon Tyne
- Number of locations: Various power stations
- Area served: North East England
- Key people: John Theodore Merz, Managing director

The North Eastern Electric Supply Company (commonly abbreviated to NESCo) was responsible for the supply of electricity to a large amount of North East England, prior to the nationalisation of the British electricity industry with the Electricity Act 1947. The company was established as the Newcastle upon Tyne Electric Supply Company (also abbreviated to NESCo) in 1889, but was renamed the North Eastern Electricity Supply company as it expanded to supply the North East region.

== History ==
The Newcastle upon Tyne Electric Supply Company was founded in Newcastle upon Tyne, North East England, in 1889 by the industrialist John Theodore Merz. The company was one of two that were founded in the Newcastle area that year, with the Newcastle and District Electric Lighting Company (DisCo) founded by Charles Algernon Parsons. A line was roughly drawn down the city's Grainger Street, with NESCo supplying the area to the east and DisCo that to the west.

NESCo opened its first power station, Pandon Dene, in 1890. Merz's son, Charles Hesterman Merz worked at the Pandon Dene station and became the company's Chief Consultant Engineer. Charles Merz's design company, Merz & McLellan, which he founded with William McLellan, undertook much of NESCo's design work from 1898 onward. They designed the pioneering Neptune Bank Power Station, which opened in 1901. It was the first power station in the United Kingdom to generate three-phase electric power, and the first to supply electricity for industrial purposes rather than just lighting. This led to the rapid expansion of NESCo, and gave the Tyneside industries an advantage over those in other areas. For the 30 years following the opening of the Neptune Bank station, NESCo became one of the World's leading companies in power station development.

NESCo opened Carville Power Station in 1903 to supply power for the Tyneside Electrics. In 1905 NESCo expanded its territory by taking over the Walker and Wallsend Union Gas Company. After a series of parliamentary battles with DisCo, NESCo extended its supply and distribution area south of the River Tyne, and it opened Dunston Power Station in this new territory in 1910. By 1914 NESCo had expanded this area further by absorbing the County of Durham Electrical Power Distribution Company, the County of Durham Power Supply Company and the Houghton-le-Spring and District Electric Lighting Company. Carville B Power Station opened in 1916, the most economical power station in the World at the time. After the First World War it took over the Cleveland and Durham County Electric Power Company, the Northern Counties Electricity Supply Company, Durham County Electric Power Company, and Tees Power Station Company. It also took over the assets of the Durham Collieries Electric Power Company and the Hexham & District Supply Company following their liquidations. NESCo opened North Tees Power Station in 1921 and Dunston B Power Station in 1933.

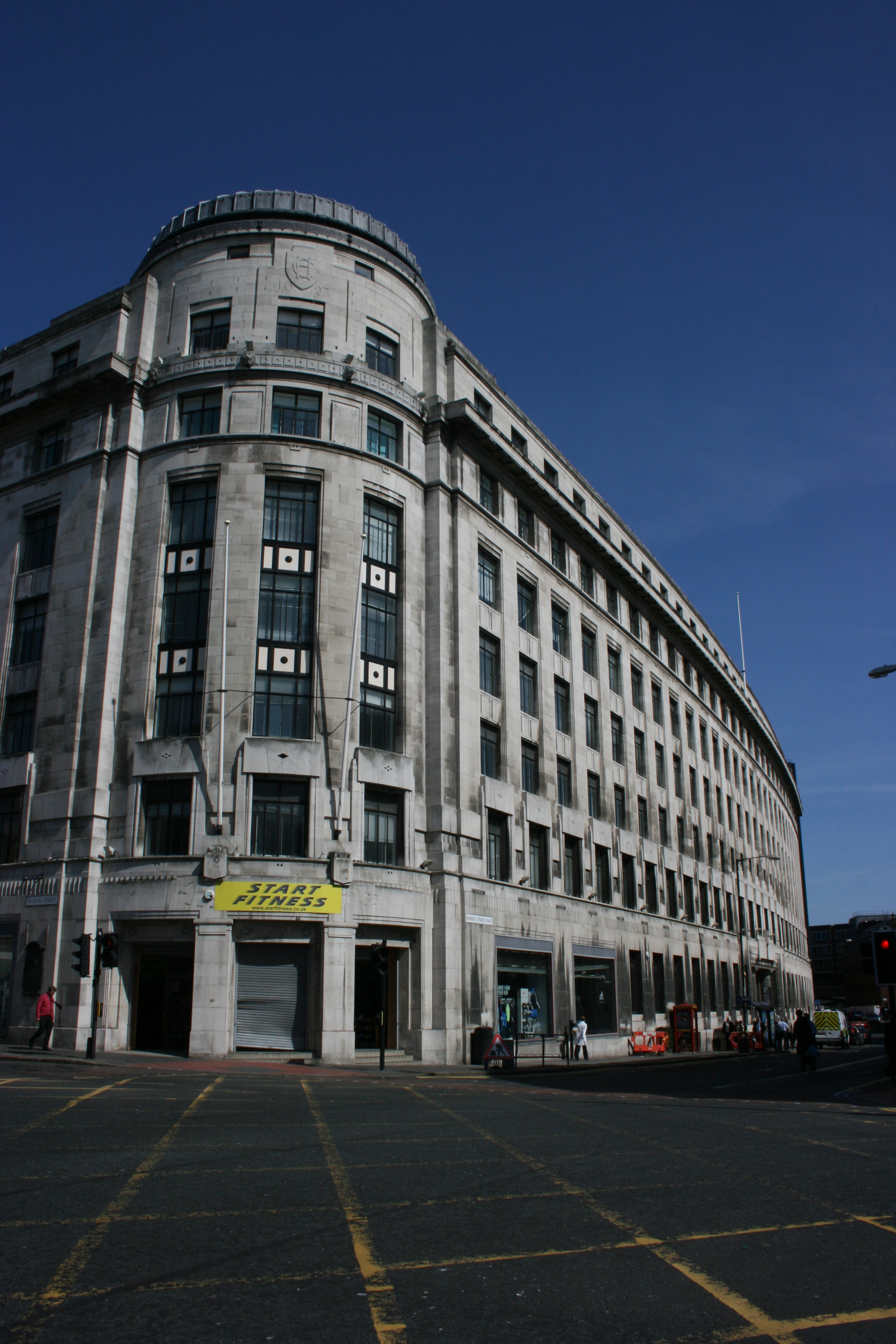
NESCo moved into Carliol House in 1927

In 1927, the company moved into their new headquarters at Carliol House in Newcastle's city centre. The building was designed by Robert Burns Dick. Carliol House Ltd. had been founded in 1924 to build and administer the building itself. It remained a separate company until 1974, after the nationalisation of the company.

North-Eastern Electric Supply Act 1932
- Act of Parliament
- Parliament of the United Kingdom
- Long title: An Act to provide for the transfer to the Newcastle-upon-Tyne Electric Supply Company Limited of the undertakings of certain other companies to change the name of and to confer further powers upon that company and for other purposes.
- Citation: 22 & 23 Geo. 5. c. xxxii

Dates
- Royal assent: 16 June 1932

Text of statute as originally enacted

The North Eastern Electric Supply Company was formed under the North-Eastern Electric Supply Act 1932 (22 & 23 Geo. 5. c. xxxii), which brought the Newcastle upon Tyne Electric Supply Company and all its subsidiaries under one company. In June 1932 it bought the Durham Electrical Power Distribution Company.

The British electricity industry was nationalised in 1948 under the Electricity Act 1947. The industry was reorganised by region and the British Electricity Authority (NESCo) was set up for the North East region and was based upon the area covered by NESCo, but also included the areas covered by DisCo, the Askrigg and Reeth Supply Company and the Hawes Electric Lighting Company. The area covered stretched from York to the Scottish border. British Electricity Authority (NESCo) was later renamed the North Eastern Electricity Board.
