= John Theodore Merz =

British chemist (1840–1922)

Dr. John Theodore Merz
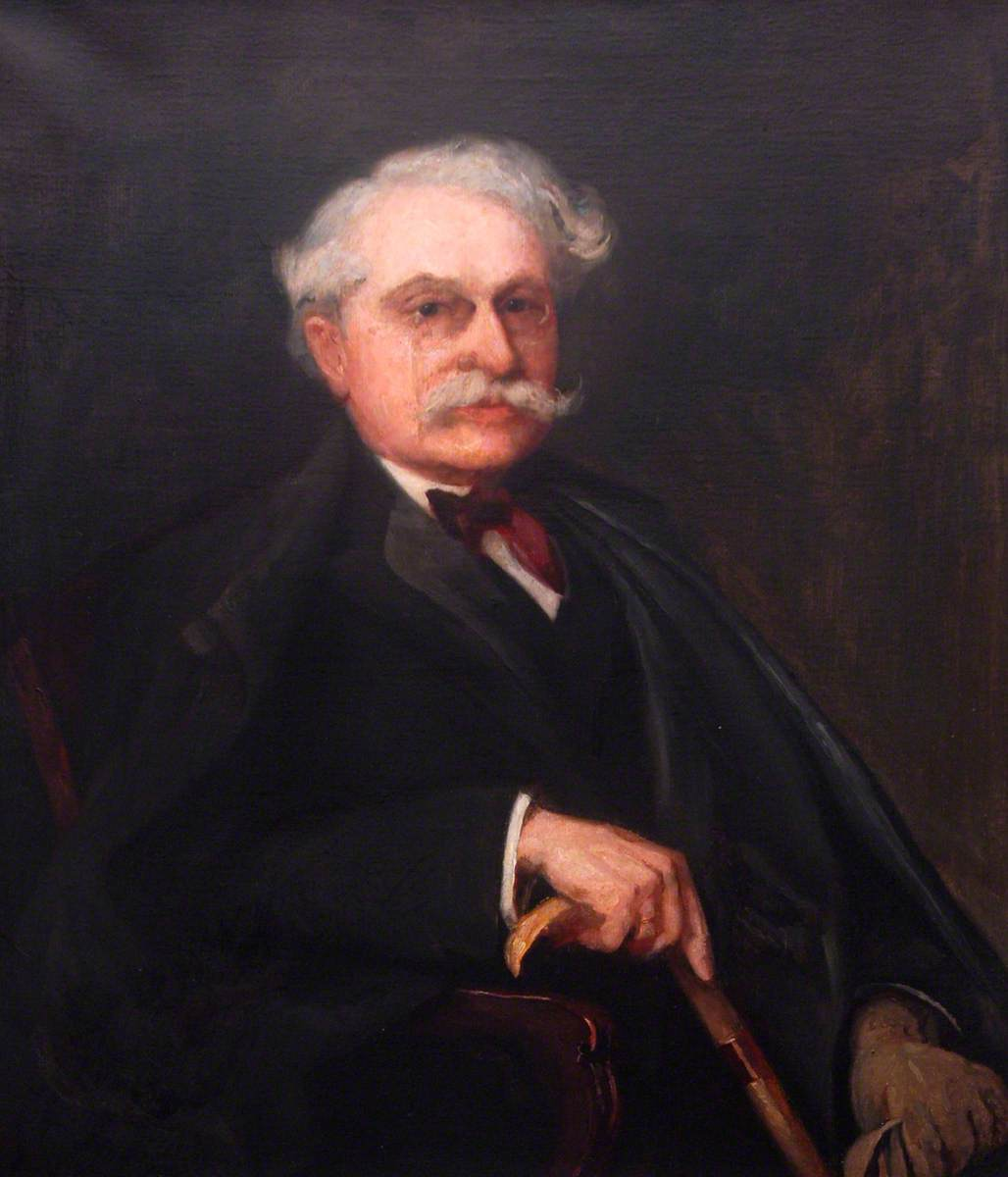
- John Theodore Merz, portrait by Percy Bigland
- Born: 30 May 1840; Manchester, England
- Died: 21 March 1922 (aged 81)
- Education: University of Giessen; Göttingen; Heidelberg; Bonn
- Occupation: Electrical Engineer
- Organization: North Eastern Electric Supply Company
- Title: Chairman of NESCo
- Term: 1901-1916
- Predecessor: T.G. Gibson
- Successor: John H. Armstrong
- Board member of: North Eastern Electric Supply Company 1889-1922
- Children: Charles Hesterman Merz

John Theodore (Theo) Merz (30 March 1840 – 21 March 1922) was a German British chemist, historian and industrialist.

== Life ==
Merz was born in Manchester, England and educated at University of Giessen, Göttingen, Heidelberg, and Bonn universities.

Merz was vice-chairman of the Newcastle-upon-Tyne Electric Supply Company, which he founded in 1889. He was chairman of the Tyneside Tramways and Tramroads Company and a member of the senate of Durham University. In 1906, he was awarded an LLD degree from the University of Aberdeen.

In 1873 Merz married Alice Mary Richardson, a sister of John Wigham Richardson the Tyneside ship builder. Together they had three sons and a daughter.

His eldest son, Charles Hesterman Merz (1874-1940), was a successful electrical engineer who pioneered the use of high-voltage three-phase AC power distribution in the United Kingdom.

His second son, Norbert Merz (1877-1948), was a chartered accountant.

His only daughter, Teresa Merz (1879-1958), was a social worker, magistrate and philanthropist.

His youngest child, Ernest Merz (1881-1909), was a solicitor.

Merz was buried in Elswick, St John's Cemetery.

== Works ==
The author of philosophical works on Leibniz, and Religion and Science (1915), his four volume History of European Thought in the Nineteenth Century consummated William Whewell's History of the Inductive Sciences (1837) and The Philosophy of the Inductive Sciences, Founded Upon Their History (1840) as well as William Stanley Jevons' Principles of Science (1874). Merz' first two volumes describe the development of mathematical and scientific thought, and the final two volumes depict the development of philosophy. Merz stated the following with reference to his history:

It is the object of these volumes to fix, if possible, this possession; to rescue from oblivion that which appears to me our secret property; in the last and dying hour of a remarkable age to throw the light upon the fading outlines of its mental life; to try to trace them, and with the aid of all possible information, gained from the written testimonies or the records of others, to work them into a coherent picture, which may give to those who follow some idea of the peculiar manner in which our age looked upon the world and life, how it intellectualised and spiritualised them.

It was Merz's objective to write this history of thought from the point of view of one who shared in the progress and watched many of the changes and movements, and to set out the inner life of his contemporaries and the secret springs of their judgements and opinions.

== Legacy ==
His mathematical library known as the Merz Collection is held by Newcastle University. It consists of 4000 volumes, including works on philosophy, European history and German Literature. The university's Merz Court was named after the Merz family.
