= Carliol House =

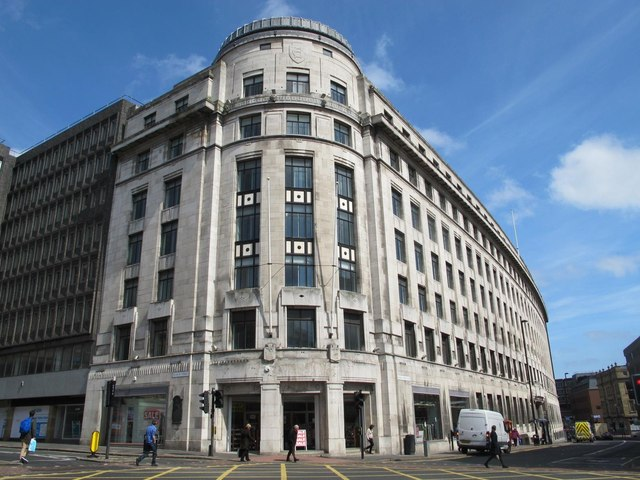
- Carliol House at the corner of Pilgrim Street and Market Street
- Interactive map of the Carliol House area

General information
- Coordinates: 54.9734°N 1.6108°W
- Year built: 1924–1927

Technical details
- Floor count: 7

Design and construction
- Architects: John James Burnet; Thomas S. Tait; Francis Lorne; L J Couves & Partners

Carliol House is a Grade II listed building in Newcastle upon Tyne that curved the corner of Market Street East and Pilgrim Street in the city-centre. As of 2024 only the façade of the building remains.

== Building ==
The 7-storey Art Deco building was constructed in the between 1924 and 1927 to be the new headquarters of the North Eastern Electric Supply Company. It was designed by John James Burnet, Thomas S. Tait and Francis Lorne with L J Couves & Partners. The façade of the building uses Portland stone features and classical detailing as well as a plaque commemorating local developer of the incandescent light bulb, Joseph Swan. The internal structure of the building used a steel frame and the doorcase was granite and Frosterley Marble. A dome was at the top of the building. The building featured electric lifts, heating and a central vacuum plant for cleaning. The building also housed the offices of Merz & McLellan.

== Recent history ==
The building gained listed grade II status on 29 March 1987. In the 2010s the building had been used as a branch of sportswear retailer, Start Fitness. Despite objections from Historic Buildings & Places among others the building was given the go-ahead to be largely demolished in the early 2020s. The building had been called "one of the city's finest buildings".

In August 2023, the demolition of the interior of the building was completed whilst retaining the 130 meter long façade. Building work will continue on the larger site, now called the Pigrim's Quarter, until 2025. The development headed up by David and Simon Reuben is part of a £155 million redevelopment scheme. In 2027 the building project will be handed over to HM Revenue and Customs who will be relocating 9000 staff from the Benton Park View site outside of the city centre.
