= Billingham Biomass Power Station =

Biomass power station at Billingham

- Country: England
- Location: Billingham
- Coordinates: 54.587°N 1.261°W
- Status: Planned
- Owner: Gaia Power

Thermal power station
- Primary fuel: Biomass

Power generation
- Nameplate capacity: 45 MW

Billingham Biomass Power Station is a planned biomass power station, that is to be built on the River Tees at Billingham. It is to be built on the site of the former coal-fired North Tees Power Station. The station will have a generating capacity of 45 megawatts (MW).

The station was granted planning permission in October 2009. The construction of the power station will cost £200 million, and is expected to be completed by 2012. The project was initiated by Gaia Power, who chose Aker Solutions to develop the project.

As at September 2024 the old power station site remains undeveloped.
