= Anglo Great Lakes Graphite Plant =

Former graphite plant in Newcastle upon Tyne, England

Anglo Great Lakes Graphite Works
- Location in Tyne and Wear
- 54.969°N 1.712°W
- Location: Tyne and Wear, England, UK
- OS grid reference: NZ185639

The Anglo Great Lakes Graphite Plant was a large graphite works situated in the North East of England. It was positioned at Lemington in Newcastle upon Tyne, on the north bank of the River Tyne. The plant was operated by the Anglo Great Lakes Corporation and produced high grade carbon for use in Magnox nuclear reactors, Advanced Gas-cooled Reactors and low grade carbon for use in carbon arc burning.

== History ==
The plant was built on the Newburn Haugh. During World War I a munitions factory was built on the site. The factory was demolished following World War II and the land reclaimed. The graphite plant was then constructed in 1958 for the conversion of carbon into graphite for use in the nuclear industry, supplying graphite for nuclear power stations including; Bradwell, Dungeness 'A', Hinkley Point 'B', Hunterston 'A', Hunterston 'B', Latina & Oldbury. The plant continued operating until the early 1990s and was subsequently demolished, along with the neighbouring Stella North power station. The two adjoining sites were redeveloped as an industrial/business park, Newburn Riverside. The reclamation scheme cost £46 million. One North East, North East Ambulance Trust and DEFRA are amongst the organisations which now have premises there.
