= Charles Hesterman Merz =

British electrical engineer

Charles Hesterman Merz (5 October 1874 – 14 or 15 October 1940) was a British electrical engineer who pioneered the use of high-voltage three-phase AC power distribution in the United Kingdom, building a system in the North East of England in the early 20th century that became the model for the country's National Grid.

== Early life ==
Merz was the eldest son of industrial chemist John Theodore Merz (a Quaker from Germany) and Alice Mary Richardson, a sister of John Wigham Richardson the Tyneside ship builder. He was born in Gateshead and attended Bootham School, York. He attended Armstrong College in Newcastle, where his father was a part-time lecturer.

== Career ==
He then entered an apprenticeship at the Newcastle Electric Supply Company (NESCo), which had been founded by his father, in 1889. In 1898 Merz became the first Secretary and Chief Engineer of the Cork Electric Tramways and Lighting Company in Cork, Ireland. In 1899 Merz set up a consulting firm which, with the arrival of William McLellan in 1902, became Merz & McLellan. Merz and McLellan had first worked together in Cork. His next major project was the Neptune Bank Power Station in Wallsend near Newcastle. It was the first three-phase electricity supply system in Great Britain, and was opened by Lord Kelvin on 18 June 1901. In the same year he toured the US and Canada. Together with Bernard Price, he developed and patented one of the earliest forms of automatic mains protection. This system was successful and became known as the Merz-Price system. When Price was succeeded by Philip Vassar Hunter, Merz worked with him to develop an improved version which became known as the Merz-Hunter system. He was known affectionately within the electricity industry as the "Grid King".

He was a consultant to a local tramway company on the electrification of their horse-drawn routes and, subsequently, to the Tyneside local lines of the North Eastern Railway, a pioneer of British mainline railway electrification, whose electric systems were turned on in 1904. As well passenger commuter lines, these included a 0.75 mi (1.21 km) freight line using the ES1 electric locomotive.

In 1905 he first attempted to influence Parliament to unify the variety of voltages and frequencies in the country's electricity supply industry, but it was not until World War I that Parliament began to take this idea seriously, then appointing him head of a Parliamentary Committee to address the problem. In the same war he was appointed Director of Experiments and Research on the Board of Invention and Research an appointment that led to his nationality being questioned in the House of Commons.

Between 1907 and 1913 Merz was hired by Thomas James Tait to electrify the railway system in Melbourne, Australia. The new system began operation in 1919, after World War I.

From 1912 to 1915 he was Vice-President of the Institution of Electrical Engineers.

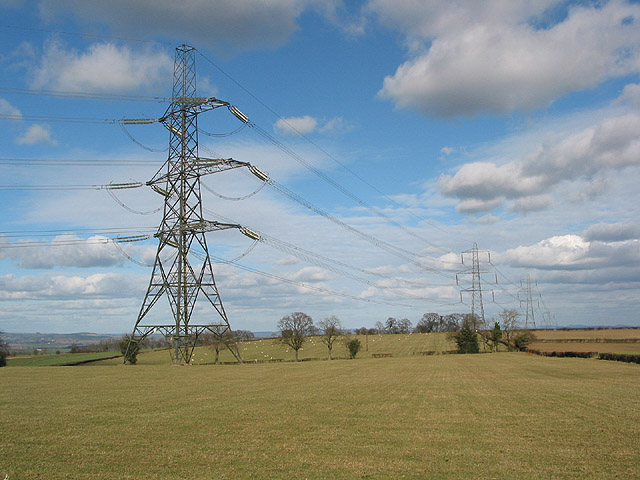
National Grid in 2008 in Herefordshire

In 1916 Merz pointed out that the UK could use its small size to its advantage, by creating a dense distribution grid to feed its industries efficiently. His findings led to the Williamson Report of 1918, which in turn created the Electricity Supply Bill of 1919. The bill was the first step towards an integrated system. He also sat on the Weir Committee, which produced the more significant Electricity (Supply) Act of 1926, leading to the setting up of the National Grid.

Merz's own system ran at 40 hertz, 20,000 volts, but he was forced to convert it to 50 hertz to match the European system.

Merz received the Faraday Medal in 1931, was awarded an honorary D.Sc by the University of Durham in 1932, was a Member of the Institution of Civil Engineers and Fellow of the American Institution of Electrical Engineers.

Merz wrote his memoir in 1934.

In 1940 Merz designed the electric drive equipment for the TOG 1 tank. In the same year, aged 66, he was killed during an air raid, with his two children, at their house at 14 Melbury Road, Kensington, London, by a German bomb.

== Legacy ==
The Faculty of Engineering at the University of Cambridge manages a Charles Hesterman Merz Fund.

The Newcastle University campus includes a building named Merz Court which was opened in 1965. The building houses electrical, electronic and chemical engineering facilities.

A commemorative plaque was unveiled at his former home in Gosforth, Newcastle Upon Tyne in 2013.
