= North Tees Power Station =

North Tees A, B & C Power Stations
- North Tees C Power Station in the 1980s
- Country: England
- Location: Billingham
- Coordinates: 54.587°N 1.263°W
- Status: Decommissioned and demolished
- Construction began: 1921
- Commission date: 1921
- Decommission date: 1983
- Operators: North Eastern Electric Supply Company (1921–1948); British Electricity Authority (1949–1955); Central Electricity Authority (1955–1957); Central Electricity Generating Board (1957–1971); Imperial Chemical Industries (1971–1983)

Thermal power station
- Primary fuel: Coal

Power generation
- Units operational: A station: Two Metropolitan-Vickers 20 MW; B station: Two Parsons and one Metropolitan Vickers; C station: Two 60 MW
- Nameplate capacity: 1921: 40 MW; 1983: 263 MW

North Tees Power Station refers to a series of three coal-fired power stations on the River Tees at Billingham in County Durham. Overall, they operated from 1921 until 1983, and the C station, the last on the site, was demolished in 1987. Billingham Biomass Power Station is to be built on their site.

== North Tees A ==
=== History ===
In 1917, the Newcastle upon Tyne Electric Supply Company (NESCo) took control of the principal electrical undertakings for a large area in south County Durham and North Yorkshire. To supply the newly acquired area, NESCo built the North Tees Power Station on the banks of the River Tees at Billingham. The construction of the station began in 1917 and was completed for opening in 1921.

=== Design and specification ===
The station was designed by the engineering consultants Merz & McLellan. The station used two Metropolitan-Vickers 11.5 kV, 40Hz 20,000 kilowatt (kW) turbo-alternators (actually 2 x 10,000 kW tandem alternators) to generate electricity, giving it a total generating capacity of 40,000 kW. Ten Babcock & Wilcox boilers which were used to provide the steam to the turbines in the station, were famous in engineering circles at the time. In 1918 the boilers became the first in the world to use steam at up to 450 psi, and pioneered the practice of reheating it during expansion in the turbine plant. This development resulted in a further increase in the efficiency of power generation, and an appreciable decrease in the quantity of coal consumed per unit of electricity generated. In 1922, W.S. Monroe of the Chicago-based consulting firm Sargent & Lundy described North Tees Power Station as "the most advanced power station in the world".

The station was connected by NESCo's high voltage transmission lines to their power stations on the River Tyne, for successful running "in parallel". When the UK's national grid distribution system was brought into use in 1932, the station was one of a small number of stations in the region to be converted from the 40 hertz (Hz) frequency used by the North Eastern grid system to the 50 Hz frequency used by the national system. However, the nearby ICI plant, which operated its own power station, required the North Tees A station's power as back-up, but the power needed to be supplied at 40 Hz, and so the A station retained three frequency changers to supply back-up power for many years after the change over, until the 1950s, when new electrical equipment needed to be ordered at the ICI plant.

=== Closure ===
The A station closed in 1959, after a number of years being used as a reserve station for high demand. Following closure, Metropolitan-Vickers took the rotors from the stations and tested them to destruction, to find out why the older machines were more efficient than the new ones.

== North Tees B ==
The B station was commissioned in 1934, and used pulverised fuel firing, an advanced technology at the time the station was built. The station generated electricity using two Parsons and one Metropolitan-Vickers turbines, each driving two alternators in tandem. It was demolished in the late 1960s.

Upon nationalisation of the British electricity supply industry in 1948 the ownership of North Tees A and B power stations were vested in the British Electricity Authority, and subsequently the Central Electricity Authority and the Central Electricity Generating Board (CEGB). The electricity distribution and sales functions were vested in the North Eastern Electricity Board.

The electricity output from the A and B stations was:

North Tees A and B station output GWh
Year	Station output GWh
1953/4	174.2
1954/5	239.6
1955/6	191.3
1956/7	120.9
1957/8	76.6
North Tees B
1960/1	31.113
1961/2	25.0
1962/3	45.22
1966/7	48.786

== North Tees C ==
=== History ===
North Tees C Station was proposed in 1945, by the original two stations' operators, NESCo. However, the scheme was taken over by the British Electricity Authority when NESCo was nationalised in 1948. The station was built by the Cleveland Bridge Company and completed in 1949. Unit 2 was commissioned in July 1952.

=== Design and specification ===
The C station had four Parsons 60,000 kilowatt (kW) turbo-alternators with steam raised in seven Babcock and Wilcock boilers fed via a steam range, giving it a total generating capacity of 240 MW. The station's exterior was designed by Giles Gilbert Scott, who also designed Battersea Power Station. The station was one of the first in the world to use hydrogen cooled generators. It was also the first in England to use 66,000 V air blast switchgear.

The boilers had an output capacity of 2,520,000 pounds per hour (317.5 kg/s) of steam at 900 psi (62.1 bar) and 496 °C. In 1971 the station delivered 1,097.33 GWh of electricity.

The electricity output from the C station was:

North Tees C station output GWh
Year	Station output GWh
1953/4	1097.7
1954/5	1171.7
1955/6	1089.3
1956/7	1055.7
1957/8	1128.6
1960/1	1445.45
1961/2	1338.6
1962/3	1275.6
1966/7	1110.1
1971/2	1097.3
1978/9	378.0

=== Closure ===
The station was operated by the CEGB (north east region), The station was decommissioned on 31 October 1983, with a generating capacity of 236 MW. In 1987, the site was acquired by Able UK and the station demolished so they could redevelop the site as Billingham Reach Industrial Estate.

== Future of site ==
The station's site is currently part of Billingham Reach Industrial Estate, an international wharf owned by Able UK Ltd. On 15 October 2009, planning permission was granted for the Billingham Biomass Power Station, which is to be built on the site of the former coal-fired power stations. As at September 2024 the old power station site remains undeveloped.
