= Dunston Power Station =

Coal-fired power station in England

Dunston power station
- Dunston B Power Station; Viewed from southwest
- Official name: Dunston A and B power stations
- Country: England
- Location: Dunston
- Coordinates: 54°57′37″N 1°39′32″W
- Status: Demolished
- Construction began: 1908 (A station); 1930 (B station); 1947 (Gas turbine)
- Commission date: 1910 (A station); 1933–1951 (B station); 1955 (Gas turbine)
- Decommission date: 1975–1981
- Owners: Newcastle-upon-Tyne Electric Supply Company (1910–1947); British Electricity Authority (1948–1954); Central Electricity Authority (1954–1957); Central Electricity Generating Board (1957–1981)

Thermal power station
- Primary fuel: Coal
- Secondary fuel: Natural gas

Power generation
- Units operational: A station: Two 7.2 MW AEG, one 6.25 MW Brown Boveri, one 13.2 MW Brown Boveri and later one 15 MW C. A. Parsons and Company gas turbine B station: Six 50 MW C. A. Parsons and Company
- Nameplate capacity: 1910: 33.85 MW; 1951: 333.85 MW; 1955: 348.85 MW; 1981: 98 MW

External links
- Commons: Related media on Commons

Sometimes confused with the nearby Stella power stations.

Dunston Power Station refers to a pair of adjacent coal-fired power stations in the North East of England, now demolished. They stood on the south bank of the River Tyne, in the western outskirts of Dunston in Gateshead. The two stations were built on a site that is now occupied by the MetroCentre. The first power station on the site was known as Dunston A Power Station, and the second, which gradually replaced it between 1933 and 1950, was known as Dunston B Power Station. The A Station was, in its time, one of the largest in the country, and as well as burning coal had early open-cycle gas turbine units. The B Station was the first of a new power station design, and stood as a landmark on the Tyne for over 50 years. From the A Station's opening in 1910 until the B Station's demolition in 1986, they collectively operated from the early days of electricity generation in the United Kingdom, through the industry's nationalisation, and until a decade before its privatisation.

Dunston A had a generating capacity of 48.85 megawatts (MW) in 1955, and Dunston B had a generating capacity of 300 MW. Electricity from the stations powered an area covering Northumberland, County Durham, Cumberland, Yorkshire, and as far north as Galashiels in Scotland.

== Dunston A Power Station ==
=== History ===
With the expansion of the electric supply industry in the early 1900s, power stations were built to supply homes with electric lighting. Around Newcastle upon Tyne this led to the construction of power stations at Lemington, The Close and Carville. Two supply companies built the stations, the Newcastle-upon-Tyne Electric Supply Company (NESCo) to the east of Newcastle, and the Newcastle and District Electric Lighting Company (DisCo) to the west. To meet an increasing demand for electricity, NESCo commissioned Dunston Power Station (later Dunston A Power Station) on the Derwent Haugh, a large flood plain to the west of Gateshead, to balance the supply of the Newcastle area with the Carville station. Construction of the new station began in 1908, the work undertaken by the company of Sir Robert McAlpine. They completed the construction in the short time of 20 months, and this was to be their first in a large number of power station constructions, following the decline of the railway industry. In 1910, the station was opened and began generating electricity.

=== Design and specification ===
The station was of a similar design to other local power stations at Carville and Lemington, and was a large triple-gabled brick building. However, Dunston A was built several years after the other local stations, and so because of advances in power station design, was larger and was able to produce more electricity than the others. The station was originally equipped with two turbo-alternators rated at 7.2 megawatts (MW), made by AEG of Germany, and two turbo alternators rated at 6.25 MW and 13.2 MW, made by Brown Boveri of Switzerland, for a total generating capacity of 33.85 MW. The turbo alternators were supplied with steam from 24 coal-burning Babcock & Wilcox marine water-tube boilers.

==== Low temperature carbonisation plant ====
In 1925, NESCo set up a separate plant at the power station for the low-temperature carbonisation treatment of coal, before being burned in boilers and the steam used for electricity generation. The treatment plant was manufactured by Babcock & Wilcox, and set up in a self-contained boiler house which contained four boilers, four retorts and pulverising mills. The building was also fitted with gas-stripping and by-product plants. The carbonising plant could handle up to 100 tonnes of coal per day, while its boilers produced 78,000 lb of steam per hour. This plant was extended in 1931.

==== Gas turbine plant ====
Between 1947 and November 1955, the station was extended, and a 15 MW Parsons gas turbine turbo alternator was installed, bringing the capacity of the station up to 48.85 MW. The gas was supplied by pipe line from the Norwood Coke Works, 1.5 mi (2.4 km) away in the Team Valley.

The electricity output from the A station was as follows.

Dunston A electricity output
Year	1954	1955	1956	1957
Electricity output, GWh	53.032	56.967	46.991	25.461

== Dunston B Power Station ==
As part of a transition from the 40 Hertz (Hz) system, used by the Newcastle-upon-Tyne Electric Supply Company, to the 50 Hz system, used by the new UK National Grid, which took place in 1932, a new power station was built to replace the A power station.

=== Design and specification ===
The new Dunston B Power Station was designed by consulting engineers Merz & McLellan. Its design was different from those of other power stations at the time, because it enclosed the machinery in a steel frame clad with glass. This was a departure from the usual power station designs, which normally enclosed the machinery in a concrete or brick wall. Dunston B is thought to be the first power station in the UK, and possibly even the world, to be built in this way. The station was also the first in the world to use metal-clad switchgear at a voltage as high as 66,000 V.

Construction of the new power station started in 1930, but the Second World War delayed its full completion until 1951. The station was opened in stages throughout its construction, as some generating units were able to be put into production while the other sections were still under construction. Initially, 3 x 50,000 kW sets were ordered, with the first unit commissioned in January 1933.

The new station had a capacity of 300 MW, produced by six 50 MW generating sets. These were made by C. A. Parsons and Company and were the largest machines ever constructed under Charles Algernon Parsons' supervision.

The station's units were the first application of reheated steam in steam turbines in the world, an improvement which gave them a heat consumption of only 9,280 BTU per kilowatt hour, the most efficient system in the UK. In 1939 the station was said to be "at the head of all the Power Stations in Great Britain as regards thermal efficiency". The station remained one of Britain's most efficient systems until the 1950s.

The stations' buildings were around 100 ft (30 m) tall. Flue gas was discharged through six 250 ft (76 m) tall chimneys, one for each of the station's six generating units. The station was fitted with two electrostatic precipitators in 1953, one completed in June that year and the other in September. They were fitted to reduce smoke and pollution from the station.

=== Operations ===
The plant's water system was cooled by using the nearby River Tyne, rather than using a cooling tower system. Coal for the station was supplied from various coal mines in the North Durham coalfields, and was brought to the station by train, on what was a freight-only line. Since the time of the station's closure this line has been upgraded for use by passenger trains, and is now used as part of the Newcastle & Carlisle Railway. Once delivered to the station, coal was shunted by CEGB No. 15 "Eustace Forth", which was built by Robert Stephenson & Hawthorns in 1942, and No. 13 "The Barra", which was built by Hawthorn Leslie & Company in 1928. These two engines are now stored, respectively, at Locomotion Museum and the Tanfield Railway.

Various ships disposed of the station's ash waste by carrying the fly ash down the river and dumping it in the North Sea. These vessels included Bobby Shaftoe, Bessie Surtees and Hexhamshire Lass – which were also used by the nearby Stella power stations – as well as a number of tugs towing hopper barges, including Mildred.

In 1971, the station had an installed capacity of 282.5 MW comprising two 52 MW and four 44 MW generator sets. The boilers had an output capacity of 2,250,000 pounds per hour (283.4 kg/s) of steam at 600 psi (41.4 bar) and 427/454 °C. In 1971, the station delivered 508.83 GWh of electricity.

The electricity generating capacity and output of Dunston B power station are shown in the tables. Separate figures are given for the Part I plant (1933–39) and the part II plant (1949–50).

Dunston B (part I plant) electricity capacity and output
Year	1954	1955	1956	1957	1958
Installed capacity, MW	184	184	184	184	184
Electricity output, GWh	1,057.600	1,014.282	872.428	695.021	583.341

Dunston B (part II plant) electricity capacity and output
Year	1954	1955	1956	1957	1958	1967	1971	1979
Installed capacity, MW	96	96	96	96	96	282.5 (total I & II)	282 (total I & II)	104
Electricity output, GWh	743.548	725.263	672.284	495.410	632.392	576.899	508.831	117.145

== Closure, demolition and present ==
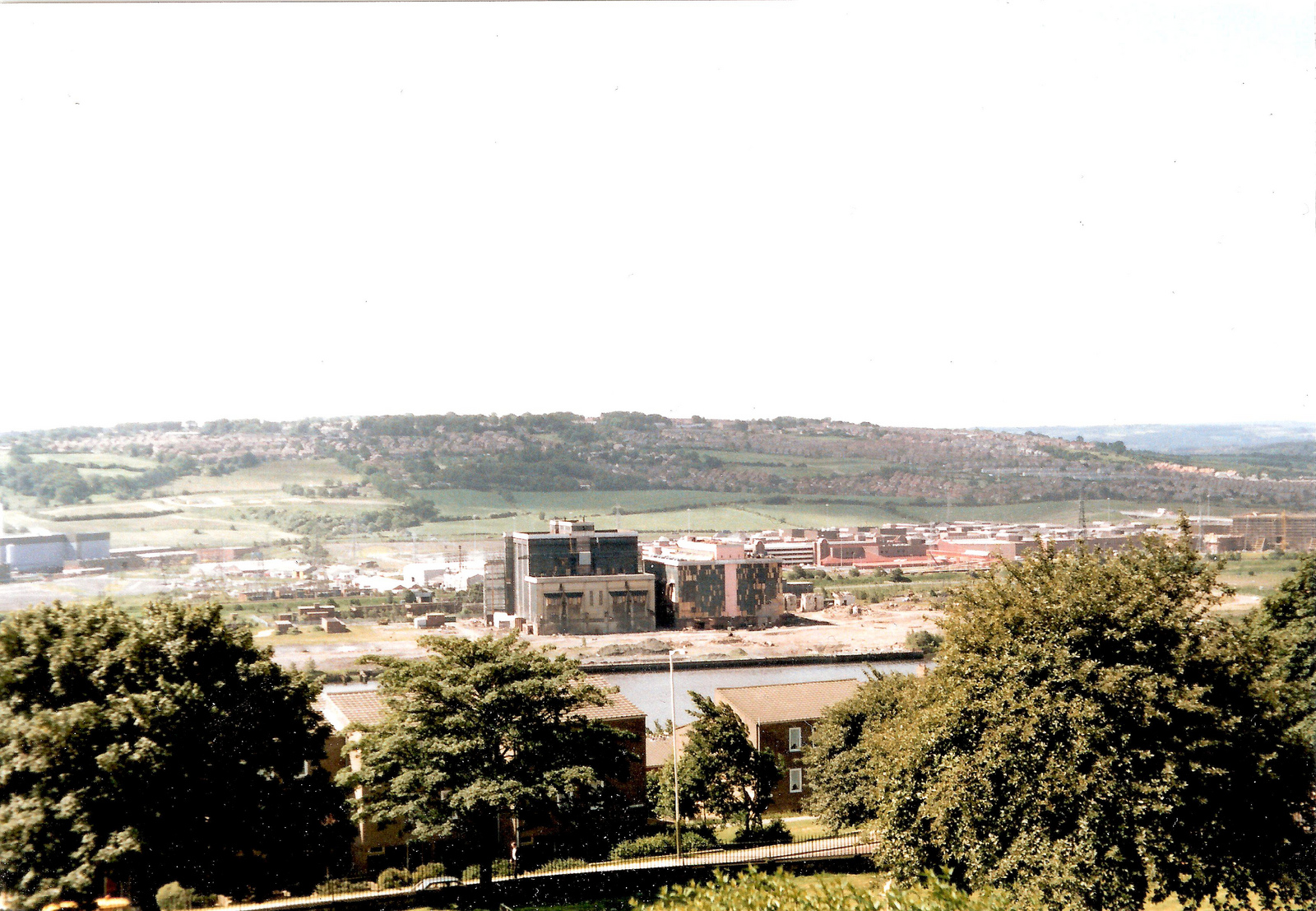
The partially demolished station, viewed from Benwell in 1986, with the almost completed Metrocentre visible behind

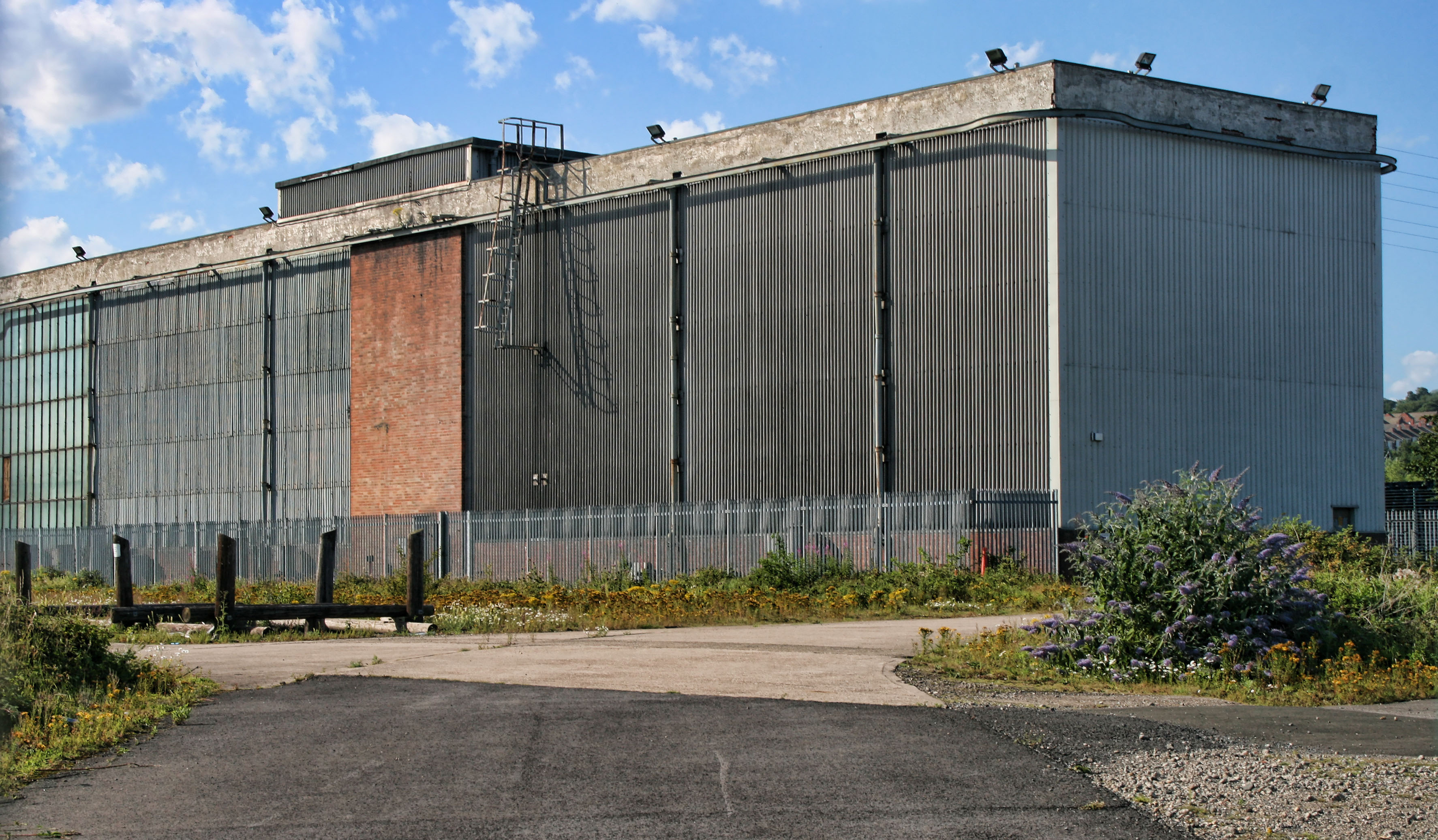
All that remains of the station is a large indoor sub-station.

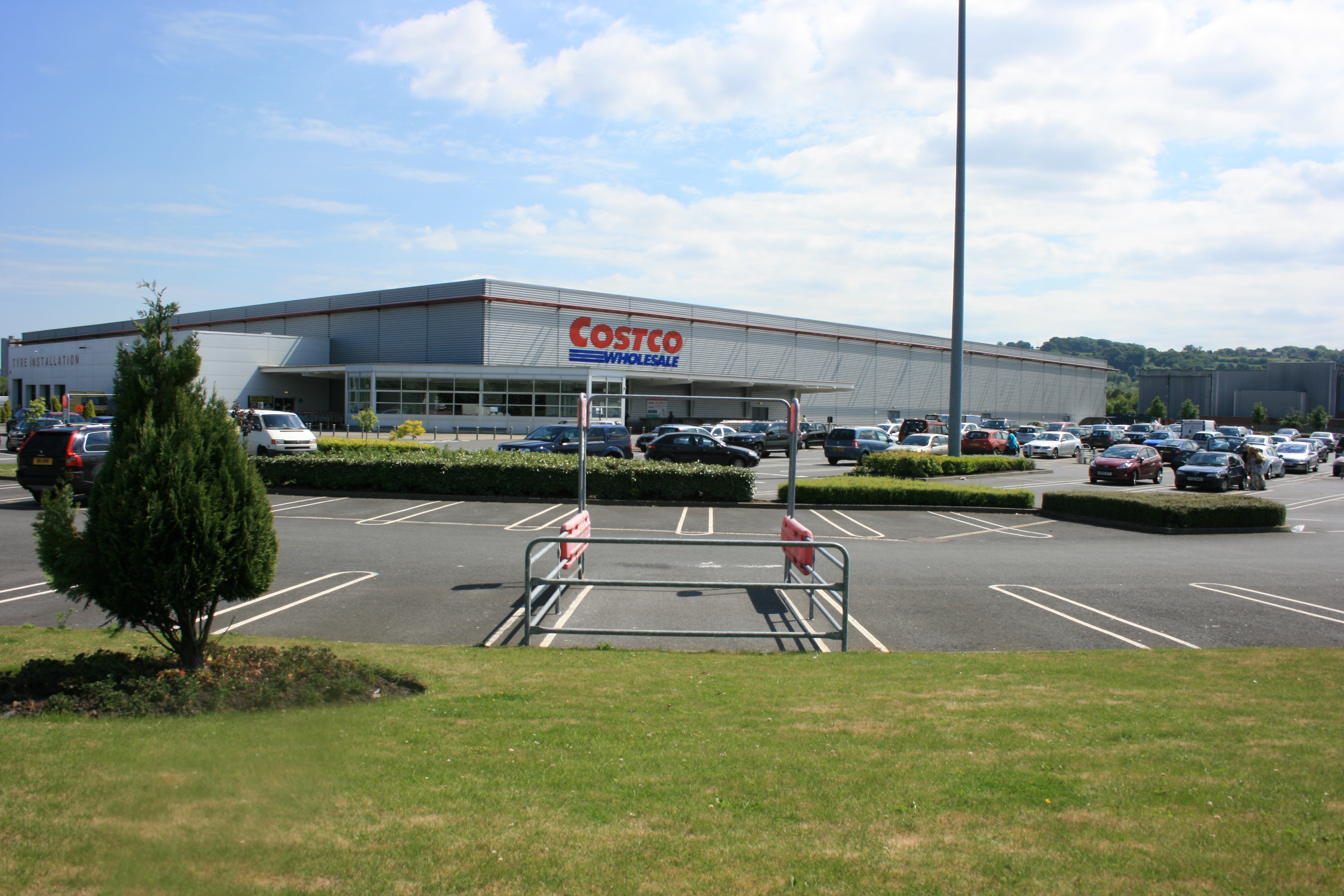
There is now a Costco Wholesale on the site of the power station.

In its time, Dunston B Power Station ranked consistently in England's leading stations, both in terms of thermal efficiency and cost per unit of electricity. However, the station eventually became outdated, and notification of its partial closure was given in October 1975, with some units being closed the following October. It was then only used as a stand-by station, operating only at peak electrical demand times. Finally, after some units having been in operation for about 40 years, the station ceased to generate electricity on 26 October 1981. At the time of closure, only 98 MW of the station's capacity was in use.

The station was demolished in 1986 to make way for the MetroCentre, which became Europe's largest shopping and leisure centre. The land on which the MetroCentre was built was bought for only £100,000, because the site was water-logged and had been used for dumping ash produced by the power station. American warehouse club chain Costco has since built a store on the actual site of the power station. The power station's large indoor sub-station still stands alongside it, as the only trace of the site's former use.

Due to the closure of Dunston power station, along with the later closures of the power stations at Stella and Blyth, the northern part of North East England has become heavily dependent upon the National Grid for electrical supply. However, in the south of the region there are still two large power stations at Hartlepool and Teesside, meaning that the south of the region does not depend upon the National Grid for electrical supply as much as the north of the region.

== Visual and cultural impact ==
The power station's six chimneys were a prominent local landmark, visible from along a 8.6-mile (13.8 km) stretch of the Tyne valley running from Bensham in Gateshead to Heddon-on-the-Wall in Northumberland.

When in operation, the B station briefly featured in Get Carter, a 1971 crime film starring Michael Caine. Dunston B appears as part of the film's backdrop, viewed from the now-demolished Frank Street in Benwell, as the funeral cortège of the main character's brother Frank leaves a house on the street.

The station was also a popular subject for photographers. It featured in the work of documentary and press photographer Bert Hardy, who photographed it from Benwell, using it as a backdrop whilst photographing a mother and child. It was also photographed by Welsh documentary photographer Jimmy Forsyth (photographer) as part of his Scotswood Road collection.

== See also ==
- List of power stations in England
- Timeline of the UK electricity supply industry
- Energy use and conservation in the United Kingdom
- Electricity Act 1947
- Electricity Act 1957
- Northern Electric
