= William McLellan (Scottish electrical engineer) =

Scottish electrical engineer

Colonel William McLellan CBE (1874–1934) was a Scottish electrical engineer. Born in Palnackie, McLellan joined Charles Merz in 1902 to form the Merz & McLellan consulting engineering partnership. In the 1920s, then Colonel McLellan, he designed the Galloway Hydro-Electric Power Scheme.
