= Merz & McLellan =

- Industry: Electrical engineering consultants
- Founded: 1902
- Defunct: 2000
- Fate: Acquired
- Successor: Parsons Brinckerhoff
- Headquarters: Newcastle upon Tyne, England
- Key people: Malcolm Kennedy (Chairman)

Merz and McLellan was a leading British electrical engineering consultancy based in Newcastle.

== History ==
The firm was founded by Charles Merz and William McLellan in Newcastle upon Tyne in 1902 when McLellan joined Merz's existing firm established in 1899. The partnership was instrumental in designing the United Kingdom's first three-phase electrical supply network, on Tyneside and, for the next century, continued to advise other Commonwealth countries on setting up their own networks.

In the early 1960s, Merz & McLellan started a scheme in the interest of reclaiming land owned by the London Brick Company in Peterborough; James Price took up the position of senior resident engineer. That became known as the "Peterborough Dust Disposal Scheme".

In 1995, the partnership merged with the Parsons Brinckerhoff consultancy and, in 2000, the new owners announced that the Merz & McLellan name would be discontinued.

In 2010, Mott MacDonald consultancy announced that it had bought Merz and McLellan South Africa.

== Selected contracts ==
- 1901: Neptune Bank Power Station
- 1904: Carville Power Station, Wallsend, UK
- 1908 & 1912: Electrification of Melbourne suburban railways in Victoria, Australia.
- 1911: Electrification of North Eastern Railway (UK)
- 1914-18: Mobile power stations for the battlefield
- 1921: North Tees Power Station
- 1925: Report on electrification of the New Zealand suburban systems in Auckland, Wellington, Christchurch and Dunedin. (including the Lyttelton railway line between Lyttelton and Christchurch
- 1933-51: Dunston B power station, Dunston, Newcastle-Upon-Tyne, UK
- 1940s: Orlando Power Station, Johannesburg, South Africa
- 1950s: Kariba South dam power generators
- 1950s: Wairakei Power Station Geothermal Power Station, New Zealand
- 1953: Blyth A Power Station, Cambois, Northumberland, UK
- 1960s: Bell Bay Power Station, Tasmania, Australia
- 1962: Blyth B Power Station
- 1967–76: Cerros Colorados Complex Plant Transmission System, Argentina
- 1969: Longannet Power Station
- 1980–1993: Kariba South dam hydroelectric upgrade
- 1989: Subiya oil-fired power station, Kuwait

== Merz & McLellan firms still independent ==
- Sinclair Knight Merz (Australia)
