= John Wigham Richardson =

English shipbuilder (1837–1908)

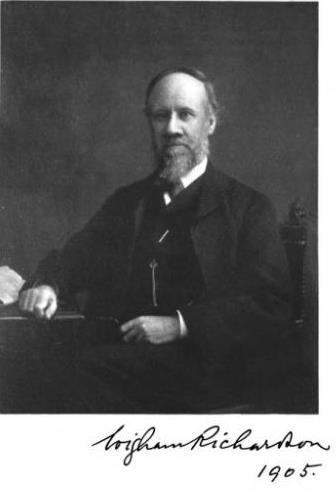
- John Wigham Richardson in 1905
- Born: 7 January 1837; Newcastle-upon-Tyne, England
- Died: 15 April 1908 (aged 71); London, England
- Resting place: Kensal Green Cemetery, London
- Education: Bootham School, York
- Occupation: Shipbuilder
- Known for: Founder of Neptune Works, co-founder of Swan Hunter and Wigham Richardson
- Spouse: Marian Henrietta Thöl
- Children: Philip Wigham Richardson, Ernestine, Maurice Wigham, Cecil, Theodora Wigham, George Beigh, Felix Gabriel
- Parent(s): Edward Richardson and Jane Wigham
- Relatives: Charles Herterman Merz (nephew)

John Wigham Richardson (7 January 1837 – 15 April 1908) was an English shipbuilder on Tyneside during the late 19th and early 20th century.

== Early life and career ==
Richardson was born on 7 January 1837, the son of devout Quakers Edward Richardson and Jane Wigham, and grew up in Newcastle-upon-Tyne. He was educated at Bootham School, York. His nephew, Charles Merz, was a pioneer of electricity distribution in the UK and internationally conceiving the idea of a synchronised electricity grid, now common throughout the world.

Although the family business was in leather tanning, he devoted his life to shipbuilding, learning his skills initially as a draughtsman for Lloyd's Register of Shipping in Liverpool (in 1853) and then as an apprentice to Jonathon Robson, a steam-tug builder in Gateshead (from 1853 to 1856).

In 1860, at the age of just 23, he founded the Neptune Works, often incorrectly referred to as Wigham Richardson, at Walker on Tyne, with a loan of less than £5,000 from his father. This was one of the world's first shipyards to build ships in steel, and the original steam engine on the site also provided electric lighting to the neighbourhood.

The company later merged with Swan Hunter's yard to become Swan Hunter and Wigham Richardson in 1903. This Company became the most technically advanced ship building facilities anywhere and built the RMS Mauretania for Cunard which was launched in 1906 and held the Blue Riband as the fastest liner across the Atlantic for 26 years.

True to his Quaker beliefs, John Wigham Richardson cared greatly for the workers in his company and was a founder of the Workers’ Benevolent Trust in the region, a forerunner to the trades’ union movement. In 1890 he became President of North East Coast Institution of Engineers & Shipbuilders. The yard built all sorts of ships, other than warships. However, in his later years, Richardson moved away from the Quaker faith and attended an Anglican church.

Among his many passions was one for sundials. He wrote papers on the construction of sundials which were advanced for their time. His most famous sundial was on the store house at the Neptune shipyard at Walker on Tyne. This is now in the collection of the Tyne and Wear Museums.

== Personal life and death ==
In 1864, he married Marian Henrietta Thöl, the daughter of a prominent Hamburg businessman, Nicolaus Johann Phillip Thöl, founder of J.P. Thöl & Co Merchants of London. They had seven children, Philip Wigham Richardson (1865–1953), Ernestine (1868–1953), Maurice Wigham (1869–1937), Cecil (1870–1885), Theodora Wigham (1871–1932), George Beigh (1872–1935), Felix Gabriel (1878–1894). He died on 15 April 1908 and is buried at Kensal Green Cemetery, London.

== Publications ==
- Memoirs of John Wigham Richardson, 1837-1908. Glasgow, H. Hopkins, 1911. Digital version at HathiTrust
