= Renwick =

Renwick may refer to:

Places

- Renwick, Cumbria, England
- Renwick, Iowa, United States
- Renwick, New South Wales, Australia
- Renwick, New York, United States, see List of places in New York: R
- Renwick, New Zealand

People

- Sir Arthur Renwick (1837–1908), Australian physician, politician and philanthropist
- Clan Renwick of Scotland
- Alexander Macdonald Renwick (1888–1965) Moderator of the General Assembly of the Free Church of Scotland in 1931
- David Renwick (born 1951), writer and creator of the BBC television sitcom One Foot in the Grave
- Ed Renwick (1938–2020), Louisiana political scientist and political commentator
- A number of people named James Renwick
- John "Renny" Renwick, a fictional character from the Doc Savage book series
- Pascal Renwick (1954–2006), French voice actor
- Robert Renwick, 1st Baron Renwick (1904–1973), British industrialist and public servant
  - Renwick Baronets
  - Baron Renwick
- Robbie Renwick (born 1988), Scottish swimmer
- Renwick Williams, known as "The Monster", charged with various assaults in 1790

Other

- The Renwick Gallery in Washington, DC, United States
