= South Metropolitan Electric Light and Power Company =

- Type: Public limited company
- Industry: Energy: Electricity generation and supply
- Predecessor: Crystal Palace District Electric Supply Company; Blackheath and Greenwich District Electric Light Company
- Founded: 16 June 1904
- Defunct: 31 March 1948
- Fate: Nationalisation
- Successor: British Electricity Authority and London Electricity Board
- Headquarters: London
- Area served: London, Kent (part), Surrey (part)
- Key people: see text
- Services: Electricity supply
- Revenue: £27,796 (1923)

The South Metropolitan Electric Light and Power Company Limited was a British electricity undertaking. It was established in 1904 upon the amalgamation of two south London companies which had supplied electricity in south east London since 1893. It owned and operated a power station at Blackwell Point and one at Penge. From 1925 it formed an association with three other London companies, with the intention of centralising electricity generation in the new, high thermal efficiency, power station at Barking. The South Metropolitan Company was abolished in March 1948 upon the nationalisation of the British electricity supply industry.

== Background ==
The South Metropolitan Electric Light and Power Company Limited took over the interests of several early south London electricity supply companies.

The Electric Construction and Maintenance Company was registered on 30 June 1883. The name was changed to the Electric Installation and Maintenance Company on 2 December 1889, and then to the Crystal Palace District Electric Supply Company on 19 December 1891. A provisional order to supply electricity, the Crystal Palace and District Electric Lighting Order 1890, was granted by the Board of Trade and confirmed by Parliament by the Electric Lighting Orders Confirmation (No. 12) Act 1890 (53 & 54 Vict. c. cxcviii). The Crystal Palace District Company supplied electricity to parts of the districts Camberwell, Lambeth, Lewisham, Croydon, Beckenham and Penge from February 1893.

The Blackheath and Greenwich District Electric Light Company Limited was registered on 11 May 1896. A provisional order was granted by the Board of Trade to supply electricity to Greenwich, Charlton, Eltham, Lee, Kidbrook, and Lewisham. The Blackheath and Greenwich District Electric Lighting Order 1897 was confirmed by Parliament by the Electric Lighting Orders Confirmation (No. 11) Act 1897 (60 & 61 Vict. c. clxiv). The local authorities had the right to purchase the part of the undertaking within its district at a premium of 33 per cent above the capital expended. Electricity supplies started from Blackwall Point power station in 1900.

On 16 June 1904 the Crystal Palace District undertaking was taken over by the Blackheath and Greenwich District Electric Light Company. Following the take-over the combined undertaking was known as the South Metropolitan Electric Light and Power Company Limited. The company's supply area comprised the metropolitan boroughs of Lewisham and Greenwich except the parish of St Nicholas Deptford, the Urban District of Penge, a small part of the south of the Metropolitan Borough of Lambeth, and a small part of the south of the Metropolitan Borough of Camberwell. The company was authorised to supply current to small areas in the Croydon County Borough and the Beckenham and Penge urban districts.

== Operations ==
=== Management Board ===
The management board of the South Metropolitan Company in 1909 comprised:

- Henry St John Winkworth (Chairman)
- William May
- Henry White Bowden (Managing Director)

The company offices were at 183-185 High Street Lewisham.

In 1936–38 the board was composed of:

- Sir Bernard Greenwell (Chairman)
- M. B. U. Dewar
- Sir Robert Renwick

The company offices were at County House, 46/47 New Broad Street, London EC2.

=== Power stations ===
The Crystal Palace District generating works was known as the Springfield Works, and was located in Springfield Road, Sydenham. The works were opened in 1893 and closed about 1904–10.

Penge power station also supplied electricity to the South Metropolitan Company system.

The Blackheath and Greenwich Company build a power station at Blackwall Point on the site of the East Greenwich tide mill. It opened in February 1900. In 1907 the station had been equipped with 2 x 2-phase 3,000-volt 1,500 kW turbo alternators.

In 1923 the plant at Blackwall Point comprised:

- Boilers:
  - Coal fired boilers producing 371,000 lb/h (46.7 kg/s/) of steam which supplied:
- Generators:
  - 2 × 1,500 kW turbo-alternator, alternating current,
  - 1 × 2,500 kW turbo-alternator, alternating current,
  - 3 × 5,000 kW turbo-alternator, alternating current,

These machines had a total generating capacity of 20,000 kW.

The electricity available to customers was:

- 2-phase AC 50 Hz, or 3-phase AC 50 Hz, at 400, 200 and 100 Volts.

=== Operational data ===
The amount of electricity load for the Crystal Palace District undertaking was as follows:

Crystal Palace District operational data, 1893–1903
Year	Equivalent 8 candle-power (35 W) lamps	Electricity load, kW
1893	3,913	136.9
1894	7,337	256.8
1895	9,058	317.0
1896	12,103	423.6
1897	16,523	578.3
1903	31,400	1,099.0

The amount of electricity and number of customers of the Blackheath and Greenwich District operations 1900–03 was as follows.

Blackheath and Greenwich District operational data, 1900–03
Year	No. of 8 c-p ( 35 W) lamps	Electricity load, kW	No. of customers
1900	14,473	506.6	342
1901	29,449	1,030.7	746
1902	44,961	1,573.6	1,234
1903	60,540	2,118.9	1,784

Both data tables demonstrate the rapid increase in electricity demand for electricity during this period. Comparative data for the Blackheath and Crystal Palace undertakings in 1903 was as follows.

Blackheath and Crystal Palace operational data, 1903
Undertaking	Blackheath and Greenwich	Crystal Palace
Capacity of plant, kW	2,000	855
Maximum load, kW	1,035	530
No. of customers	1,734	–
Equivalent 8 c-p lamps	60,540	31,400
Electricity sold, MWh	1,180	424
Load factor, per cent	13.02	9.10

The data demonstrates that the Crystal Palace undertaking was about half the size of the Blackheath and Greenwich undertaking.

=== Electricity supply ===
The business of the South Metropolitan Company increased to meet the rising demand for electricity. The following table summarises the growth of the Company in terms of capacity of the plant, the electricity load, the amount of current sold, and the number of customers.

South Metropolitan Company operating data, 1904–1946
Year	Capacity of plant, kW	Max load, kW	Electricity sold, MWh	No. customers	Connected load, kW	Load factor, per cent
1904	2,000	1,035	1,180	2,555		13.02
1905	2,300	1,400	2,144	2,858		
1906				3,201		
1907			2,947	3,383		
1908			3,303	3,649		
1912	6,000	4,000	5,481	5,263	9,060	15.6
1913			6,662			
1919	20,000	8,500	15,643	7,641	21,332	21.0
1921	20,000	10,150	17,643		22,900	25.0
1922	20,000	9,000	19,698		24,160	29.3
1923	20,000	10,000	20,765		24,430	29.8
1924			25,182			
1931			55,864			
1933	20,000	35,100	75,643	29,578	90,512	28.5
1934			97,785			
1935			113,338			
1936	20,000	50,140	139,650	48,177	170,419	33.4
1946		15,680	15,337			

Growth in sales of electricity in MWh
Growth in sales of electricity in MWh

From 1903 the South Metropolitan Company was authorised to supply electricity in bulk to the West Kent Electric Company; in 1923 the South Metropolitan supplied the Kent Company 5,323 MWh.

=== Electricity use ===
Electricity was originally used for lighting but ‘power’ uses were soon established. The following table illustrates the changing patterns of use.

South Metropolitan Company End use of Electricity, 1921–1936, MWh
Use, MWh	Year					
Use, MWh	1921	1922	1923	1924	1931	1936
Public lighting	0	0	0	0	71	874
Domestic supply	3,162	3,738	4,265	19,644	40,335	47,888
Power and heat	9,381	9,863	11,732	19,644	40,335	41,222
Traction	0	0	0	0	0	0
Bulk supply	5,099	5,097	4,707	5,538	14,458	49,666
Total	17,643	18,698	20,705	25,182	55,864	139,650

=== Financial statistics ===
The capital required to establish, build and operate the business was raised through the offer of shares. Capital expenditure was needed for the purchase of land, buildings, machinery, mains, transformers, meters, electrical instruments, legal costs, fixtures and furniture at the stations. The capital expenditure for the Crystal Palace Company in 1896 was £75,770 1s 9d, and in 1897 was £7,965 15s 1d.

Crystal Palace financial data, 1893–1897
Year	Receipts, £ s d	Working cost £ s d
1893	857 17 2	3,354 11 5
1894	1,977 14 7	3,675 12 3
1895	2,611 2 10	3,668 18 0
1896	3,491 15 9	4,305 17 6
1897	4,604 2 8	5,244 10 2

The Blackheath and Greenwich, and South Metropolitan (from 1904) Company current account revenue was as follows.

Blackheath and Greenwich, and South Metropolitan (from 1904) current account revenue.
Year	Gross revenue, £ s d	Expenditure, £ s d	Net revenue, £ s d
1900	4,195 2 1	4,050 4 2	114 17 11
1901	7,080 9 7	5,658 5 4	2,150 4 3
1902	14,334 5 2	6,978 13 10	7,355 11 4
1903	19,450 1 10	8,409 0 0	11,041 1 10
1904	28,793 16 6	12,222 0 3	16,574 16 3
1905	35,421 13 11	13,290 4 7	22,131 9 4
1906	38,244 13 6	14,125 15 10	24,118 17 8
1907	43,302 9 5	16,234 10 3	27, 067 19 0
1908 (estimate)	43,000 0 0	16,000 0 0	27,000 0 0

Share offers were made on several occasions throughout the operating life of the company. For example, in 1909 an issue of 50,000 six per cent shares at £1 were offered. In 1938 an issue of £500,000 3½ per cent debenture stock and 500,000 4 per cent £1 shares were offered.

The overall revenue, expenses and profit for the South Metropolitan Company were as shown.

South Metropolitan current account revenue, 1913–1923
Year	Revenue, £	Expenditure, £	Profit, £
1913	56,465	19,488	3,933
1919	160,929	91,442	84,901
1922	216,760	116,493	101,316
1923	227,796	95,176	134,929

To meet the requirement of increased demand, capital expenditure on new plant and equipment was required, as shown on the table below.

South Metropolitan capital expenditure, 1907–1919.
Year	1907	1908	1909	1910	1911	1912
Capital expenditure	£42,282	£38,922	£19,062	£20,719	£18,622	£24,126
Year	1914	1915	1916	1917	1918	1919
Capital expenditure	£19,805	£22,869	£52,890	£54,300	£63,398	£94,329

Dividends to shareholders were paid throughout the operational life of the company. Dividends as a percentage of the total capital raised in a given year were as shown, together with the average dividends paid by the London company electricity undertakings.

South Metropolitan Company Shareholder dividends, 1900–1919
Year	1900	1901	1902	1903	1904	1905	1906	1907	1908	1909
Dividend %	0.66	2.19	2.19	3.01	3.21	4.30	4.73	4.52	4.73	4.28
Average dividend %	4.60	5.29	5.55	5.51	5.79	5.65	5.40	5.14	5.12	5.07
Year	1910	1911	1912	1913	1914	1915	1916	1917	1918	1919
Dividend %	4.28	4.29	4.29	4.29	4.37	5.14	5.16	5.51	5.07	5.69
Average dividend %	5.07	5.11	5.18	5.33	5.10	4.87	4.68	5.32	4.96	5.76

Company profits in the mid-1930s were: £114,325 (1935); £119,762 (1936); and £149,933 (1937).

=== Joint working ===
The South Metropolitan Company and three other companies in south and east London promoted the London Electricity (No. 1) Act 1925 (14 & 15 Geo. 5. c. lxii). The four companies were: the City of London Electric Lighting Company; the County of London Electric Supply Company; the South London Electric Supply Corporation; and the South Metropolitan Electric Light and Power Company. They established a joint committee to specify how generating stations of each company were operated. The companies remained district electricity supply undertakings; although they were physically joined with interconnecting cables. The companies envisaged that power stations such as Barking would provide enough capacity for their electricity requirements. The act required equal consideration for the interests of shareholders and consumers. Dividends to shareholders were limited to 7 percent per year and the funds that could be carried forward in the accounts were restricted. Profits above these conditions formed a 'consumers' benefit' in the form of lower prices.

The County of London Company built the 118.75 MW Barking A power station which was commissioned in 1925. This was followed by the 303.5 MW Barking B commissioned from 1933.

These interconnections and those provided by the national grid enabled the bulk transfer of electricity. In 1931 the South Metropolitan Company generated 35,157 MWh and purchased 30,216 MWh.

== Government policy ==
Under the terms of the Electricity (Supply) Act 1926 (16 & 17 Geo. 5. c. 51) the Central Electricity Board (CEB) was established. The CEB identified high efficiency ‘selected’ power stations that would supply electricity most effectively. The CEB also constructed the national grid (1927–33) to connect power stations within a region.

The British electricity supply industry was nationalised in 1948 under the provisions of the Electricity Act 1947 (10 & 11 Geo. 6. c. 54). The South Metropolitan Electric Light and Power Company Limited undertaking was abolished, ownership of Blackwall Point and Penge power stations were vested in the British Electricity Authority, and subsequently the Central Electricity Authority and the Central Electricity Generating Board (CEGB). At the same time the electricity distribution and sales responsibilities of the South Metropolitan electricity undertaking were transferred to the London Electricity Board (LEB).

Blackwall Point power station was operational until 1948, when the British Electricity Authority rebuilt it as a 100 MW station. Barking A and B power stations were operational until 1969 and 1976 respectively.

== See also ==
- Timeline of the UK electricity supply industry
- London Power Company
- Charing Cross and Strand Electricity Supply Corporation
- City of London Electric Lighting Company
- County of London Electric Supply Company
- South London Electric Supply Corporation
