= Bankside Power Station =

Former power station in Southwark, London

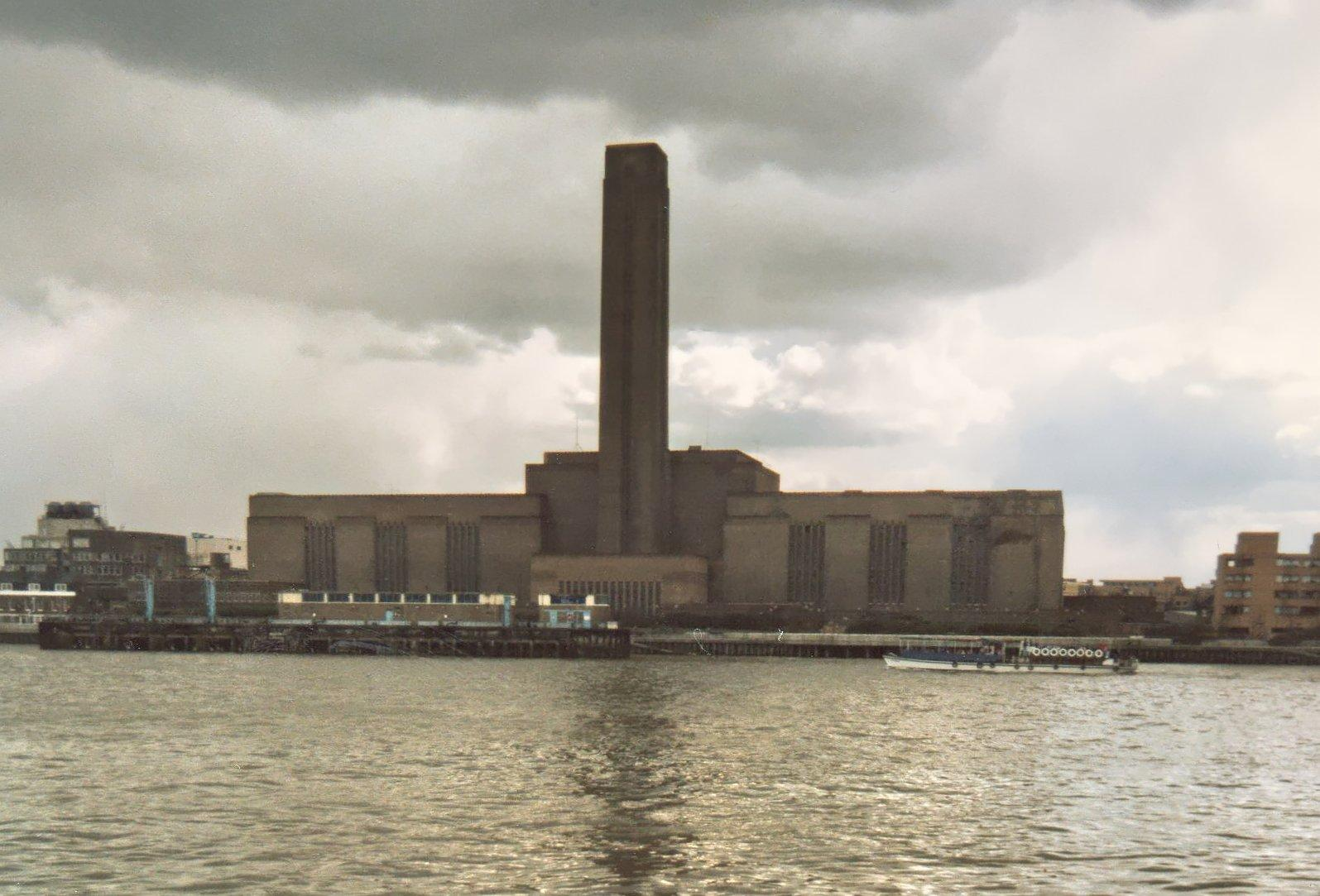
- Bankside 'B' Power Station, about 1985, before conversion to the Tate Modern
- Official name: Bankside Power Station
- Country: England, United Kingdom
- Location: Greater London
- Coordinates: 51.507625°N 0.098970°W
- Status: Decommissioned
- Construction began: 1891 (Pioneer Station), 1893 (A Station), 1947 (B Station)
- Commission date: 1891 (Pioneer Station), 1893 (A Station), 1952 (B Station)
- Decommission date: 1959 (A Station), 1981 (B Station)
- Owners: As operator(s), plus CEGB (1981–1990), Nuclear Electric (1990–1994); Tate Gallery 1994-date
- Operators: City of London Electric Lighting Company (1891–1948), British Electricity Authority (1948–1955), Central Electricity Authority (1955–1957), CEGB (1958–1981)

Thermal power station
- Primary fuel: Coal (A Station), Oil 'Bunker C' (B Station)

Power generation
- Nameplate capacity: 89 MW (A Station), 300 MW (B Station)

External links
- Commons: Related media on Commons

Bankside Power Station is a decommissioned power station located on the south bank of the River Thames, in the Bankside area of the Borough of Southwark, London. It generated electricity from 1891 to 1981. It was also used as a training base for electrical and mechanical student apprenticeships from all over the country. Since 2000 the building has housed the Tate Modern art museum and gallery.

== Pioneer station ==
The pioneer Bankside power station was built at Meredith Wharf Bankside in 1891. It was owned and operated by the City of London Electric Lighting Company (CLELCo) and supplied electricity to the City and to part of north Southwark. The generating equipment was installed by the Brush Electrical Engineering Company and comprised two pairs of 25 kW Brush arc-lighters and two 100 kW single phase alternators generating at 2 kV and 100 Hz. This equipment first supplied direct current (DC) electricity to arc lamp street lights in Queen Victoria Street on 25 June 1891. Alternating current (AC) for domestic and commercial consumers was first supplied on 14 December 1891, this was a single-phase, 100 Hz, three-wire, 204/102 volt system. Electricity cables were carried over Southwark bridge and Blackfriars bridge.

== Bankside A, 1893–1959 ==
The power station, later known as Bankside A, was extended several times as the demand for electricity grew.

An engine room, 230 ft (70 m) long and 50 ft (15 m) wide, was built in 1893 with two 200 kW, two 350 kW and two 400 kW alternators driven by Willans engines. The associated boiler house was the same length and had nine Babcock and Wilcox boilers. In 1895 the engine room was extended to 424 ft (129 m) and the boiler house to 300 ft (91 m) containing 22 boilers. In 1896 two Ferranti two Ferranti compound engines driving 1,500 kW alternators were installed.

In 1900 a new power house was built to install continuous-current plant, consisting of three 1,000 kW Allis-Westinghouse and six 2,000 kW Musgrave-Westinghouse sets. These were partly to provide a DC power supply to Fleet Street printing presses. These were followed by plant consisting of a 2,500 kW Parsons turbine driving dynamos in tandem and three 2,500 kW Parsons turbo-alternators, the latter being used for supplying the lighting load of the more remote districts.

In 1901 the boiler house was doubled in width and contained 46 boilers. In the engine room there were ten British Thomson-Houston alternators directly coupled to three-crank Willans engines, eight Brush alternators with a capacity of 3,600 kW driven by two-cylinder compound Brush engines, and two Ferranti compound engines driving 1,500 kW alternators at 150 RPM, making an aggregate capacity of 10,500 kW.

The first 2,500 kW turbo-alternator was installed in December 1910 and a second in January 1911, others followed at nearly yearly intervals. In 1913 a further 2,500 kW Parsons turbo-generator of the same pattern as the previous ones also a set consisting of two 2,000 kW Westinghouse generators driven from a Parsons turbine through gearing. By 1920 there were seven turbo-alternators with an aggregate capacity of 19,500 kW. Until 1919 the system of generation was 2 kV, single-phase AC, and 450 V DC, this was changed that year to 11 kV, three-phase AC. The steam conditions were also increased from 150 psi to 250 psi with superheat to 660 °F (349 °C).

Over the period 1921–1928 a new boiler house was built alongside the east face of the power house. This had 18 boilers. The coal strike of 1921 led to six of the boilers being specified for oil firing, although two of these were later returned to coal firing. The old boiler house and its three 150 ft (46 m) chimneys were demolished.

Bankside A generating capacity and output
| Year | Generating capacity (MW) | Annual output (GWh) | Connections (MW) |
|---|---|---|---|
| 1910 | 25 | 25.2 | 37.4 |
| 1915 | 34.5 | 29.5 | 46.2 |
| 1923 | 34.5 | 49.2 | 70.1 |
| 1928 | 89 | 79.5 | 99.4 |
| 1934 | 89 | 114.1 | 131.7 |
| 1945 | 89 | 103.0 | 127.8 |

In 1934 Bankside was connected to London ring of the National Grid and became a 'selected' station under the operational control of the Central Electricity Board.

=== Equipment at Bankside A ===
Following construction of new boiler house in 1921–1928, the steam plant at Bankside A throughout the remainder of its operational life comprised: twelve Babcock 50,000 lb/hr boilers (four oil-fired, eight coal-fired chain grate); four coal-fired Yarrow 65,000 lb/hr boilers; and two coal-fired Yarrow 70,000 lb/hr boilers. The operating pressure was 260 psi at 600-700 °F. The total evaporative capacity was 850,000 lb/hr. Condenser cooling water was drawn from the river Thames through a pump house located on the river bank at 7,800,000 gallons per hour.

At its peak in the 1930s the generating equipment comprised: one 5 MW, five 10 MW, two 15 MW Oerlikon and British Thomson-Houston turbo-alternators, and one Parsons 4 MW house service set (450-500 V), total capacity 89 MW. Some of the older plant was decommissioned. By 1952 the plant comprised one 5 MW and two 10 MW Oerlikon turbo-alternators, two 10 MW and two 15 MW B.T.H. turbo-alternators and one Parsons 4 MW set. These were fed by steam from 18 boilers; twelve Babcock & Wilcox Type C.T.M. each with a capacity of 50 klb/hr at 250 p.s.i. and 606 deg F and six Yarrow boilers of later date (65 and 75 klb/hr) with integral superheaters, Green’s horizontal “ Tri-tube ” economisers, and Yarrow tubular air heaters. The A station was closed down on 24th March to allow completion of Bankside B.

=== Complaints ===
There were numerous complaints against the power station throughout its operational life. In October 1901 the CLELCo paid the Corporation of Southwark £250 (equivalent to £27,000 in 2025) in settlement of the costs of the corporation taking a smoke nuisance action against the company. In January 1903 the company was fined £20 (equivalent to £2,000 in 2025) plus costs for "creating smoke". The CLELCo challenged some of these nuisance actions. In May 1910 an officer of the Public Control Department of the London County Council stated that he had observed black smoke issuing from the centre chimney and "in such volumes as to constitute a nuisance". This was contested by the company which said the information was inaccurate, since this was after sunset "any vapour or gas would assume a dark appearance […] and the absence of light would not ensure accuracy".

The London County Council undertook tests to measure the deposition of grit in the area during the summer of 1950. They estimated that up to 235 tons per square mile of grit was deposited in the area from Bankside ‘A’ power station during the month of September 1950.

=== Renewal and nationalisation ===
By the late 1930s Bankside was considered inefficient (in 1946 the thermal efficiency was 15.82%), old and polluting. Preliminary plans were drawn up by the CEB for a new power station, Bankside B, but World War II delayed any further redevelopment.

On 1 April 1948 the British electricity industry was nationalised, Bankside was vested in the British Electricity Authority and the electricity distribution system radiating from the power station was vested in the London Electricity Board. Bankside A was decommissioned in March 1959 and was demolished to allow the eastern end of Bankside B to be built.

== Bankside B, 1947–1981 ==
The redevelopment of Bankside power station, suspended during the war, was started again by the City of London Electric Lighting Company in 1944. It developed plans for a new power station with an ultimate capacity of 300 MW and submitted these to the planning authority the London County Council in 1944. It was a highly controversial proposal as it continued industrialisation of the South Bank which the 1943 County of London Plan had sought to redevelop with offices, flats and educational and cultural institutions. The new Bankside B power station was approved by the British Cabinet in April 1947. The designation Bankside A and Bankside B was only used when both stations co-existed during the period 1947–1959.

The building was designed by Sir Giles Gilbert Scott, the designer of Liverpool Anglican Cathedral, many of the K-series red telephone boxes, and an important consultant credited with designing the Art-deco exterior of Battersea Power Station. Bankside is a 155 m (509 ft) long, 73 m (240 ft) wide, steel framed, brick-clad building with a central chimney 99 m (325 ft) high. The chimney's height was less than that of St Paul's Cathedral, which is directly opposite, but set back from, the north bank of the Thames. The plan of the building was divided into three sections—the 85 ft (26 m) high main turbine hall in the centre, with the boiler house to the north and the electricity transformers and switch house to the south. Bankside B was set-back from the riverfront to allow the boulevard proposed in the County of London Plan to be developed at a later date.

Bankside B was designed to be coal-fired but, following a coal and power shortage in early 1947, was redesigned to be oil-fired (the first such power station in Britain). Bunker 'C' oil was delivered by barge from the Shell Haven refinery on the Thames estuary to three large underground tanks to the south of the building. Each tank was 28 m in diameter, 7.3 m high and held 4,000 tons of oil. The oil consumption of the station at full load was 67 tons per hour.

Construction work was undertaken in two phases: 1947–1952 and 1958–1963. This allowed the old Bankside A to continue in operation while the new power station was built. The western half of the building, plus the chimney, was completed first and started generating power in 1952 from four boilers and two 60 MW turbo-alternators. Bankside A was decommissioned in March 1959 and construction started on the eastern portion. This was completed December 1963 and generated electricity from one further boiler, and one 120 MW and one 60 MW turbo-alternator. The maximum total generating capacity of Bankside B was 300 MW.

=== Equipment at Bankside B ===
The specification of the boiler plant at Bankside B was as follows.

Bankside B boiler plant
| Manufacturer | Foster Wheeler | John Brown Land (Brown Riley) |
| Commissioned | 1952 | 1963 |
| Number | Four | One |
| Steam production (each) | 375,000 lb/hr | 860,000 lb/hr |
| Pressure | 950 psi | 1600 psi |
| Temperature | 925 °F | 1005 °F |
| Reheat | None | 377 psi & 1005 °F |

Condenser cooling water was taken from the River Thames at 10 million gallons per hour (1.07 million m^{3/}day). The temperature rise of the cooling water across the condensers was 15 °F (8.5 °C).

The specification of generating equipment at Bankside B was as follows.

Bankside B generating plant
| Manufacturer | British Thomson-Houston | Associated Electrical Industries | English Electric |
| Number | Two | One | One |
| Commissioned | November 1952 & June 1953 | late 1962 | December 1963 |
| Rated output | 60 MW | 60 MW | 120 MW |
| Steam conditions at turbine stop valve | 900 psi, 900 °F | 915 psi, 900 °F | 1500 psi, 1000 °F |
| Alternator cooling | Air (408 m^{3}/min) | Hydrogen | Hydrogen |
| Terminal voltage | 15 kV | | 13.8 kV |

The 120 MW turbo-alternator was in the top 20 of the most efficient of UK electricity generators between 1963–73.

The alternators were connected to 66 kV 3-phase delta-star transformers. The main 66 kV switchgear, rated at 2,500 MVA, was on the three upper floors of the switch-house: the circuit breakers on the upper floor, the selector switches below and the bus-bars on the lower floor. Two 66 kV cables ran to Battersea power station, and two to Deptford power station. Ten 22 kV cables and twelve 11 kV cables distributed to various sub-stations of the London Electricity Board.

==== Flue-gas washing ====
Bankside B had a flue-gas washing plant to mitigate air pollution at its central London location. Only two British power stations had previously been fitted with such equipment: Battersea power station and Fulham power station. At Bankside flue-gases from the boilers were washed with a three-pass counter-current/co-current flow of river water from the Thames (to which chalk was added) in cedar wood scrubber towers. This process produced a characteristic white plume from the chimney. The plant was effective at removing sulphur compounds from the flue-gases (over its operational life it achieved an overall average sulphur removal efficiency of 97.2%). However, the process cooled the gases which caused ‘plume-droop’ under certain atmospheric conditions, causing a fume nuisance at ground level. Contaminated water from the flue-gas washing plant was treated in tanks through which air was bubbled; this oxidised the sulphite to sulphate, the water was diluted with water from the condensers before being returned to the river. This pollution was insignificant in the 1950s but was detrimental to the recovery of the Thames after concerted efforts were made to clean up the river from the late 1960s.

==== District heating ====
In 1971 the London Electricity Board gained legal powers to develop a district heating scheme at Bankside. A boiler house was constructed on the north face of the building at the base of the chimney together with underground pipes in Tooley Street. The scheme was abandoned following the fuel crisis of 1973–1974.

=== Generating capacity and output ===
The total output of Bankside B for selected years over its operational life was as follows.

Bankside B generating capacity and output
| Year | Generating capacity (MW) | Annual output (GWh) |
|---|---|---|
| 1953/4 | 120 | 118.9 |
| 1958/9 | 120 | 657.7 |
| 1962/3 | 180 | 623.5 |
| 1963/4 | 300 | 536.0 |
| 1964/5 | 300 | 917.9 |
| 1965/6 | 300 | 778.2 |
| 1966/7 | 300 | 930.5 |
| 1967/8 | 300 | 937.2 |
| 1968/9 | 300 | 1,060.7 |
| 1969/70 | 300 | 1,099.8 |
| 1970/1 | 300 | 1,301.2 |
| 1971/2 | 300 | 912.6 |
| 1972/3 | 300 | 982.1 |
| 1973/4 | 300 | 662.6 |
| 1974/5 | 300 | 770.4 |
| 1975/6 | 300 | 320.7 |
| 1976/7 | 240 | 466.7 |
| 1977/8 | 240 | 314.2 |
| 1978/9 | 120 | 109.4 |
| 1979/80 | 100 | 9.6 |
| 1980/1 | 100 | 4.8 |

On 8 October 1970 the station produced 6,004,364 kWh in a 24-hour period.

Rising oil prices from 1973 made the station uneconomic compared to coal-fired power stations, resulting in it being used less often – principally during the winter and at peak times. One of the 60 MW units was decommissioned in 1976 and the two other 60 MW units in 1978. The 120 MW unit was derated to 100 MW. Bankside B was closed on 31 October 1981.

== Redevelopment ==
Following its closure there were several proposals to redevelop the redundant power station or its site. These included an industrial museum, an entertainment hall, a hotel, an opera house, and a conference and exhibition centre, but none were financially viable. There were also campaigns for the building to be saved. The group Save Britain's Heritage visited Bankside in May 1980 and produced a report on possible uses. Applications to list the building in 1987 and 1992 were refused. The government wished to sell the site and listing would have constrained how developers could intervene in the fabric of the building. Bankside was given a 'Certificate of immunity from listing' on 3 February 1993.

At the privatisation of the British electricity industry in 1990 the power station was transferred to Nuclear Electric. The company prepared the building for sale by removing asbestos and the redundant machinery at a cost of £2.5 million. An application was made to demolish the west wall of the building to enable this to be done, but contractors were able to remove the plant through a hole in the west wall. The BBC television programme One Foot in the Past focused on the impending threat to the building; the reporter, Gavin Stamp, made an impassioned plea for the building to be saved.

In April 1994 the Tate Gallery announced that Bankside would be the home for the new Tate Modern. The £134 million conversion started in June 1995 with the removal of the remaining redundant plant. The conversion work was carried out by Carillion and completed in January 2000. Some of the internal structure remains, including the turbine hall. An electrical substation, taking up the southern part of the building, remained on-site and was owned by the French power company EDF Energy. In 2006, EDF announced that they would be releasing half this holding to the museum. The oil tanks were redeveloped into a performance art space opened in July 2012. A tower extension to the museum over the tanks was opened on 17 June 2016.

== Film and television ==
Several episodes of British television, particularly science fiction series that have required industrial backdrops, such as Red Dwarf, were filmed at the station. The building featured in Danny Cannon's film Judge Dredd. It served as the Tower of London in Richard Loncraine's 1995 film version of Richard III. In its modern incarnation as the Tate Modern, the building's exterior is featured at the beginning of the first episode of Ashes to Ashes. It also appeared in Children of Men by Alfonso Cuarón. In 2018, Tate Modern was featured prominently in the Tom Cruise blockbuster, Mission: Impossible – Fallout.

== See also ==
- Battersea Power Station
- City of London Electric Lighting Company
- Energy use and conservation in the United Kingdom
- Energy policy of the United Kingdom
