= County of London Electric Supply Company =

Former British electricity company

County of London Electric Supply Company Limited
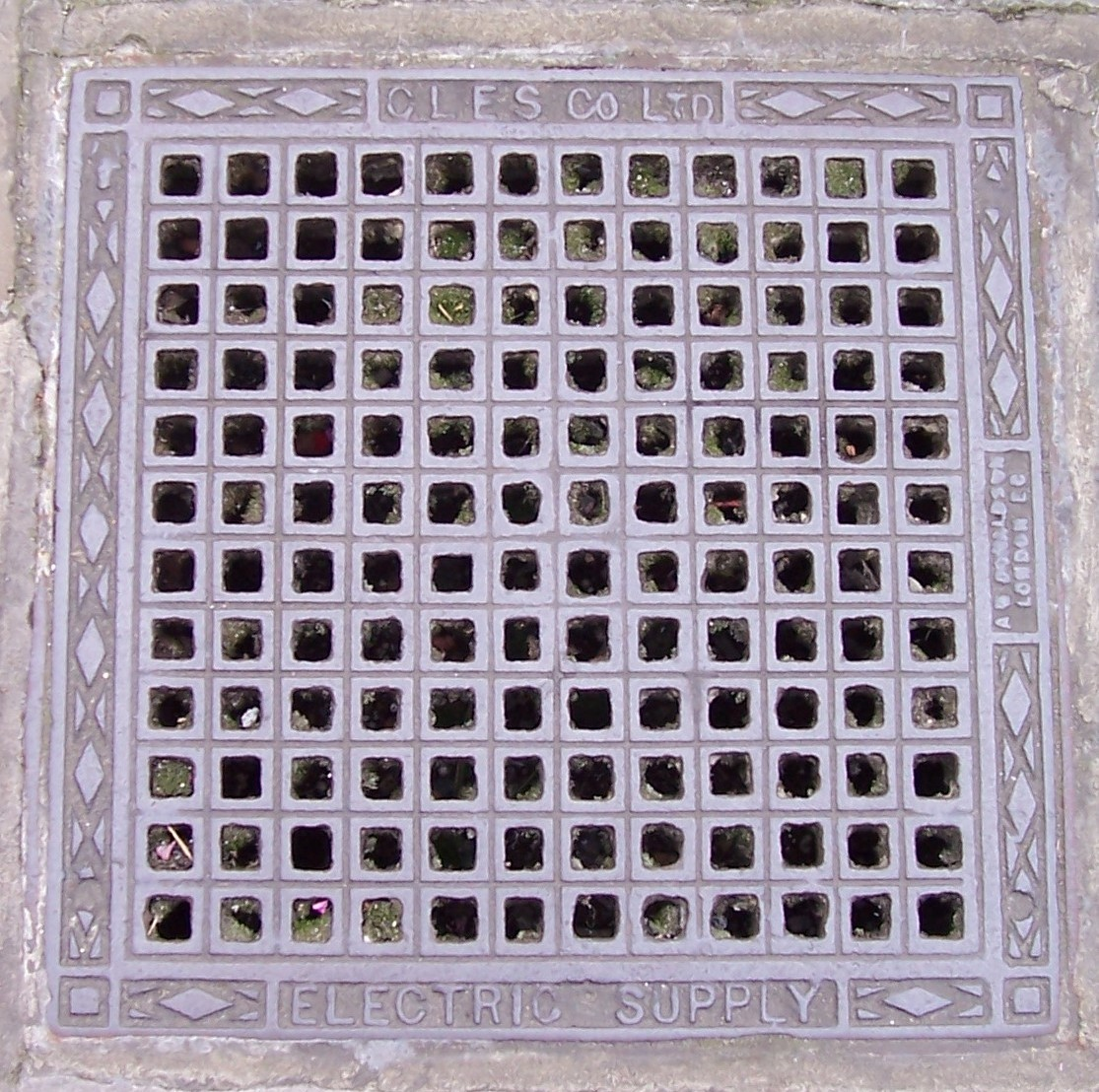
- A C.L.E.S.Co.Ltd. manhole cover, Ely Place, Holborn EC1 (September 2013)
- Formerly: County of London Electric Lighting Company Limited; County of London and Brush Provincial Electric Lighting Company Limited
- Type: Public limited company
- Traded as: C.L.E.S.Co
- Industry: Energy: electricity generation and supply
- Founded: 30 June 1891
- Defunct: 31 March 1948
- Fate: Dissolved by nationalisation
- Successor: British Electricity Authority and London Electricity Board
- Headquarters: London
- Area served: County of London; Essex; Kent
- Key people: See text
- Production output: 2,099 GWh (1946)
- Services: Electricity supply
- Revenue: £10,469 (1897), £3,602,230 (1936)

The County of London Electric Supply Company Limited (C.L.E.S.Co) was a British electricity undertaking. It was incorporated as a public company in 1891 to generate and supply electricity to parts of south west London and two parishes adjacent to the City of London. It owned and operated power stations at Wandsworth and City Road. From 1925 it cooperated with three other London companies, with the intention of centralising electricity generation in the new, high thermal efficiency, power station at Barking. The company was abolished in March 1948 upon the nationalisation of the British electricity supply industry.

== Background ==
The County of London Electric Lighting Company Limited was registered on 30 June 1891, to supply electricity to areas of north, south and south west London. The company was granted provisional orders to supply electricity as follows:

- 1892 – County of London (North) Electric Lighting Order 1892 (St Luke and Clerkenwell);
- 1892 – Wandsworth Electric Lighting Order 1892 (district of Wandsworth Board of Works, plus the parishes of Putney, Wandsworth, Tooting Graveney, Streatham and Clapham);
- 1895 – St. Olave Electric Lighting Order 1896 (St Olave Southwark);
- 1896 – Camberwell Electric Lighting Order 1896 (Camberwell);
- 1897 – County of London (Northern Extensions) Electric Lighting Order 1897 (Holborn (east part));
- 1897 – County of London (East) Electric Lighting Order 1897 (Mile End Old Town, St George’s in the East, and Limehouse District Board of Works);
- 1898 – Holborn and St. Giles' Electric Lighting Order 1898 (No. 1).

The company changed its name to the County of London and Brush Provincial Electric Lighting Company Limited in 1893. By 1903 it was called the County of London Electric Supply Company Limited.

== Operations ==
=== Management ===
The company had five chairmen between 1896 and 1948:

- Lord Rathmore
- Joseph Bevan Braithwaite
- Sir Harry Renwick
- Sir Bernard E. Greenwell
- Sir Robert Renwick

The company management board in 1922 was composed of:

- Sir Harry Renwick (Chairman and Managing Director)
- Lord Gainford
- Sir Bernard E. Greenwell
- Sir Frederick Hall
- J. A. Hosker
- R. Percy Sellon

The company’s registered address was Moorgate Court, Moorgate Place, London EC2.

=== Power stations ===
The company initially built two power stations, one at City Road and one in Wandsworth.

==== City Road power station ====
The City Road power station was located on the City Road basin on the Regent's Canal (51°31'48"N 0°05'50"W). Construction commenced in 1895 but owing to strikes of builders’ workmen it was not completed until early 1897 and supply commenced in September 1897. The initial plant installed was capable of supplying 80,000 8-candle-power lamps.

By 1900 there 12 Babcock & Wilcox boilers supplying

- 6 x 200-kW two-phase, 50 Hz Electric Construction Company alternators
- 5 x 150 kW Brush compound engines coupled directly to Mordey 100 Hz single phase alternators
- 2 x 550 kW British Thomson - Houston DC generators of 550-KW driven by E P Allis engines.

The mixed system of voltages was as a result of the progressive addition of new districts with those further away being supplied with bi phase before being transformed down.

In 1906 a British Thomson-Houston Co 1,500 kW turbine was added.

In 1923 the plant at the City Road power station comprised:

- Boilers:
  - 168,100 lb/h (21.2 kg/s), which provided steam to:
- Generators:
  - 2 × 1,500 kW turbo-alternators, alternating current,
  - 1 × 2,500 kW turbo-alternator, alternating current,
  - 1 × 5,500 kW turbo-alternator, alternating current,
  - 1 × 525 kW reciprocating engine, direct current,
  - 2 × 600 kW reciprocating engine, direct current

These machines had a total generating capacity of 10,500 kW of AC and 1,725 kW of DC.

The electricity available to customers was:

- 2-phase AC 50 Hz 104 Volts
- DC 530 Volts

City Road power station was not a 'selected station' under the Central Electricity Board's 1926 scheme, as a consequence the Company decommissioned it in 1929.

==== Wandsworth power station ====
The plant at Wandsworth power station used coal-fired boilers and Brush Universal machines coupled directly to Mordey dynamos. The plant was capable of supplying 40,000 8-candle-power lamps. In addition to the power stations, work included the laying of cables in St Luke, Clerkenwell, Wandsworth, Putney, Streatham, Clapham, Holborn and Camberwell. These were supplied at 6,000 Volts through stepup / stepdown transformers located at Wandsworth and remote substations.

In 1906 a British Thomson-Houston Co 1,500 kW turbine was added.

By 1923 the plant comprised:

- Coal-fired boilers generating up to 322,400 lb/h (40.62 kg/s) of steam which was supplied to:
- Generators:
  - 1 × 1,000 kW reciprocating engine,
  - 3 × 1,500 kW steam turbo-alternators,
  - 2 × 5,000 kW steam turbo-alternators,
  - 2 × 6,000 kW steam turbo-alternators.

These machines had a total generating capacity of 27,500 kW of alternating current.

The electricity available to customers was:

- 2-phase AC 50 Hz 205 and 404 Volts
- 3-phase AC 50 Hz 205 and 404 Volts
- DC 410 Volts

Wandsworth power station was operational until 1964.

=== Electricity supply ===
The business of the company increased to meet the rising demand for electricity. The following table summarises the growth of the company in terms of capacity of the plant, the electricity load, the amount of current sold, and the number of customers.

County of London Electric Supply Company operating data, 1897–1946
Year	Capacity of plant, kW	Max load, kW	Electricity sold, MWh	No. of customers	Connected load, kW	Load factor, per cent
1897 (City Road)			333			
1897 (Wandsworth)			117			
1904	9,250	5,342	5,755	5,222		12.3
1907		8,700	13,970		30,035	
1908	10,000		13,611	13,645		
1909		9,850	14,786			
1912	20,300	12,800	22,512	20,246	44,763	20.0
1913			25,743	22,315		
1914			28,012	24,212		
1915			30,562	25,913		
1916			35,029	26,994		
1917			37,595	27,998		
1918			40,326	28,400		
1919	34,000	25,700	42,488	31,390	82,224	18.9
1921	38,000	27,900	49,553	43,000	87,902	27.3
1922	38,000	29,800	51,220		91,550	26.1
1923	39,725	37,650	65,679	54,000	119,241	25.7
1931			509,829			
1932			604,599			
1933	412,901	250,100	693,374	163,982	492,269	38.3
1934			776,094			
1935			885,403			
1936	412,500	319,951	1,034,605	268,769	828,462	40.7
1937			1,914,953			
1946 (Wandsworth)		19,160	21,228			
1946 (Barking)		418,200	2,077,998			

Growth in sales of electricity, in GWh
Growth in sales of electricity, in GWh

=== Electricity use ===
Electricity was originally used for lighting but ‘power’ uses were soon established. The following table illustrates the quantities and changing patterns of use.

End use of electricity, 1919–1936, MWh
Use, MWh	Year				
Use, MWh	1919	1921	1922	1923	1936
Public lighting	99	276	196	112	4,960
Domestic supply	38,243	14,026	13,177	15,748	200,338
Power and heat		29,670	31,562	34,750	194,561
Traction	4,146	0	0	0	66,912
Bulk supply		5,580	6,285	7,633	567,837
Total	42,488	49,553	51,220	58,242	1,034,606

=== Financial statistics ===
The capital required to establish, build and operate the business was raised through the offer of shares. Capital expenditure was needed for the purchase of land, buildings, machinery, mains, transformers, meters, electrical instruments, legal costs, fixtures and furniture at the stations. The capital expenditure in 1896 and 1897, associated with the commissioning of the power stations at City Road and Wandsworth, amounted to:

Capital expenditure, 1896–97
Year	1896	1897
City Road	£155,596	£214,257
Wandsworth	£117,126	£196,543

Profits were made through the sale of electricity which provided an income for the company and its shareholders. An example of the sums involved is shown in the table.

Sales revenue, working cost and profit, 1897–1923
Year	Revenue from electricity sales	Working cost of generation	Excess of revenue over expenditure
1897 (City Road)	£7,141	£4,176	£2,965
1897 (Wandsworth)	£3,328	£2,047	£1,281
1912	£216,665	£87,954	£117,145
1919	£543,284	£301,603	£235,174
1922	£723,226	£402,817	£340,428
1923	£835,348	£358,122	£502,937
1936	£3,602,230	£2,421,204	£1,181,026

Shareholders dividends were paid throughout the operational life of the company. Dividends expressed as a percentage of the total capital raised in a given year were as shown, together with the average dividends paid by the London company electricity undertakings.

County of London Company shareholder dividends 1895-1919
Year	1895	1896	1897	1898	1899	1900	1901	1902	1903	1904	1905	1906	1907
Dividend %	0	0.59	1.11	1.46	3.10	4.48	4.77	4.83	4.75	4.69	4.98	5.00	5.00
Average dividend %	4.01	4.66	5.54	5.10	5.15	4.60	5.29	5.55	5.51	5.79	5.65	5.40	5.14
Year	1908	1909	1910	1911	1912	1913	1914	1915	1916	1917	1918	1919	
Dividend %	5.05	5.11	5.05	5.28	5.34	5.57	5.64	5.63	5.63	5.63	5.82	6.00	
Average dividend %	5.12	5.07	5.07	5.11	5.18	5.33	5.10	4.87	4.68	5.32	4.96	5.76	

=== Expansion ===
The company expanded its operations, particularly in East London and into south Essex and Kent.

By 1913 the County of London Company was supplying the metropolitan boroughs of Bermondsey, Camberwell, Finsbury, Holborn, Lambeth, Southwark and Wandsworth; the urban districts of Merton and Morden, Romford, and Tilbury; and the rural districts of Croydon, Orsett and Tilbury.

To meet the requirements of the expanded supply area, capital expenditure on new plant and equipment was required, as shown on the table below.

Capital expenditure, 1907–1919.
Year	1907	1908	1909	1910	1911	1912
Capital expenditure	£50,926	£84,215	£64,667	£71,135	£62,897	£95,723
Year	1914	1915	1916	1917	1918	1919
Capital expenditure	£167,680	£78,848	£53,022	£63,616	£88,398	£149,116

Electricity supplies to further areas continued. By 1937 the company was supplying electricity additionally to: the metropolitan boroughs of Barking, Beddington and Wallington, Dagenham, Mitcham, Reigate, Sutton and Cheam and Wimbledon; the urban districts of Banstead, Billericay, Brentwood, Carshalton, Caterham and Warlingham, Hornchurch, Thurrock, Wanstead and Woodford; and the rural districts of Epping, and Godstone.

The company supplied users such as the South Metropolitan Electric Tramways and Lighting Company (from 1916, supplying 2,021.0 MWh in 1919); the South London Electric Supply Corporation (from 1917, supplying 5,340.4 MWh in 1923).

Between 1918 and 1936 the company acquired 14 other electricity companies. It was able to consolidate development over a large area of south east England through its Kent Power Company subsidiary.

In 1920, the County of London Electric Supply Company applied for permission to build a power station at Creekmouth in Barking capable of expansion to 600 MW. To finance the construction the company issued shares, there were offers in 1921 and 1922. The 1922 offer consisted of 500,000 six per cent cumulative preference shares and 500,000 ordinary shares. Barking A station was built, and was commissioned in 1925.

The County of London Company and three others in south and east London promoted the London Electricity (No. 1) Act 1925 (15 & 16 Geo. 5. c. lxii). The four companies were: the City of London Electric Lighting Company; the County of London Electric Supply Company Limited; the South London Electric Supply Corporation Limited; and the South Metropolitan Electric Light and Power Company Limited. They established a joint committee to specify how generating stations of each company were operated. The companies remained district electricity supply undertakings; although they were physically joined with interconnecting cables. The companies envisaged that power stations such as Barking would provide enough capacity for their electricity requirements. The act required equal consideration for the interests of shareholders and consumers. Dividends to shareholders were limited to 7 percent per year and the funds that could be carried forward in the accounts were restricted. Profits above these conditions formed a ‘consumers’ benefit’ in the form of lower prices.

The company built Barking B power station which was commissioned in 1933.

== Government policy ==
Under the terms of the Electricity (Supply) Act 1926 (16 & 17 Geo. 5. c. 51) the Central Electricity Board (CEB) was established. The CEB identified high efficiency ‘selected’ power stations that would supply electricity most effectively. The CEB also constructed the national grid (1927–33) to connect power stations within a region.

City Road power station was not a selected station, as a consequence the company decommissioned it in 1929.

The British electricity supply industry was nationalised in 1948 under the provisions of the Electricity Act 1947 (10 & 11 Geo. 6. c. 54). The County of London Electric Supply Company undertaking was abolished, ownership of Wandsworth and Barking power stations were vested in the British Electricity Authority, and subsequently the Central Electricity Authority and the Central Electricity Generating Board (CEGB). At the same time the electricity distribution and sales responsibilities of the County of London electricity undertaking were transferred to the London Electricity Board (LEB).

Wandsworth power station was operational until 1964.

Barking A and B power stations were operational until 1969 and 1976 respectively.

== See also ==
- Timeline of the UK electricity supply industry
- List of pre-nationalisation UK electric power companies
- London Power Company
- Charing Cross and Strand Electricity Supply Corporation
- City of London Electric Lighting Company
- South Metropolitan Electric Light and Power Company
- South London Electric Supply Corporation
