= Wandsworth power station =

Former coal-fired power station

- Country: England
- Location: Wandsworth London
- Coordinates: 51°27′40″N 00°11′40″W
- Status: Decommissioned and demolished
- Commission date: 1897
- Decommission date: 1964
- Owners: County of London Electric Supply Company (1897–1948); British Electricity Authority (1948–1955); Central Electricity Authority (1955–1957); Central Electricity Generating Board (1958–1964)
- Operator: As owner

Thermal power station
- Primary fuel: Coal
- Turbine technology: Steam turbines
- Cooling source: River water

Power generation
- Units operational: 2 x 5 MW and 2 x 6 MW
- Make and model: British Thomson-Houston, Metropolitan-Vickers
- Nameplate capacity: 22 MW
- Annual net output: 21,228 MWh (1946)

Wandsworth power station supplied electricity to the London district of Wandsworth and to Putney, Tooting Graveney, Streatham and Clapham from 1897 to 1964. It was owned and operated by the County of London Electric Supply Company until the nationalisation of the British electricity supply industry in 1948. The power station was redeveloped during its operational life until it was decommissioned in 1964.

== History ==
The County of London Electric Supply Company was founded in June 1891, with the intention to supply electricity to areas of north, south and south west London. In 1892 the company applied for a provisional order under the Electric Lighting Acts to generate and supply electricity to the District of Wandsworth Board of Works which encompassed the parishes of Putney, Wandsworth, Tooting Graveney, Streatham and Clapham. This permission was granted by the Board of Trade in the Wandsworth Electric Lighting Order 1892 and was confirmed by Parliament in the Electric Lighting Orders Confirmation (No. 5) Act 1892 (55 & 56 Vict. c. ccxxvii).

The power station was built in The Causeway Wandsworth (51°27′40″N 0°11′40″W) and first supplied electricity in 1897. In 1893 the company altered its name to the County of London and Brush Provincial Electric Lighting Company Limited. By 1903 it was called County of London Electric Supply Company Limited. Other power stations operated by the County of London Company were City Road and later Barking.

== Equipment specification ==
The original plant at Wandsworth power station comprised Brush Universal engines coupled directly to Mordey dynamos. The plant had the capacity to supply 40,000 eight candle-power lamps. In 1897 the station generated 162,151 kWh; 116,821 kWh was sold to customers and there were 13,907 lamps on the circuits.

By 1900 the station contained six Raworth's 'Universal' high speed engines manufactured by Brush coupled directly to Mordey 180kW 100 Hz, single phase 2,000 V alternators with steam provided from eight Babcock & Wilcox boilers. Further expansion was also in hand to add a further five Mordey 400kW 100 Hz, bi phase 2,000 V alternators. Power was distributed at 6,000 Volts to substations Clapham, Streatham and Camberwell where it was transformed down to 2,000 Volts to local distribution transformers mainly located below the pavements.

Images of the machinery in 1900 have been produced.

=== Post-war plant ===
Following the First World War, a new plant was installed to meet the growing demand for electricity. By 1923 the generating plant comprised:

- Coal-fired boilers generating up to 322,400 lb/h (40.62 kg/s) of steam, these supplied steam to:
- Generators:
  - 1 × 1,000 kW reciprocating engine,
  - 3 × 1,500 kW steam turbo-alternators,
  - 2 × 5,000 kW steam turbo-alternators,
  - 2 × 6,000 kW steam turbo-alternators.

These machines had a total generating capacity of 27,500 kW of alternating current.

A variety of electricity supplies were available to consumers as:

- 2- phase, 50 Hz Alternating Current at 205 and 440 Volts
- 3- phase, 50 Hz AC at 205 and 440 Volts
- 410 Volt Direct Current

By 1954 the plant at Wandsworth comprised:

- Boilers:
  - 2 × Babcock and Wilcox 25,000 lb/h (3.15 kg/s) boilers with chain grate stokers, steam conditions were 160 psi and 600 °F (11.03 bar, 316 °C),
  - 3 × Babcock and Wilcox 50,000 lb/h (22.06 kg/s) boilers with chain grate stokers, steam conditions were 160 psi and 600 °F (11.03 bar, 316 °C),

The boilers had a total evaporative capacity of 200,000 lb/h (25.2 kg/s), and supplied steam to:

- Turbo-alternators:
  - 2 × British Thomson-Houston 5 MW turbo-alternators, generating at 11 kV,
  - 1 × British Thomson-Houston 6 MW turbo-alternator, generating at 11 kV,
  - 1 × Metropolitan-Vickers 6 MW turbo-alternator, generating at 11 kV.

The completed total installed generating capacity was 22 MW.

Condenser cooling water was taken from the River Wandle at 1.89 million gallons per hour (2.39 m^{3}/s).

== Operations ==
Under the terms of the Electricity (Supply) Act 1926 (16-17 Geo. 5 c. 51) the Central Electricity Board (CEB) was established in 1926. The CEB identified high efficiency ‘selected’ power stations that would supply electricity most effectively. The CEB also constructed the national grid (1927–33) to connect power stations within a region. Wandsworth power station, in addition to connections with other power stations within the County of London group, was connected via two 66 kV underground circuits to Fulham power station.

In 1946 The maximum output load supplied by Wandsworth power station was 19.160 MW, and 21,228 MWh of current was delivered.

The British electricity supply industry was nationalised in 1948 under the provisions of the Electricity Act 1947 (10-11 Geo. 6 c. 54). The County of London electricity undertaking was abolished, ownership of Wandsworth power station was vested in the British Electricity Authority, and subsequently the Central Electricity Authority and the Central Electricity Generating Board (CEGB). At the same time the electricity distribution and sales responsibilities of the County of London electricity undertaking were transferred to the London Electricity Board (LEB).

=== Operating data 1954–63 ===
Operating data for the period 1954–63 is shown in the table:

Wandsworth power station operating data, 1954–63
Year	Running hours or load factor (per cent)	Max output capacity, MW	Electricity supplied, MWh	Thermal efficiency, per cent
1954	749	15	6,958	7.92
1955	658	13	3,530	7.17
1956	402	13	2,889	6.90
1957	256	13	1,006	4.84
1958	349	13	3,585	7.06
1961	5.3 %	13	6,037	9.62
1962	5.8 %	6	5,092	9.09
1963	20.13 %	10	10,581	0.83

The data demonstrates the generally less intensive use of the plant over its final operational years.

== Closure ==
Wandsworth power station was decommissioned in 1964. The buildings were subsequently demolished. A 132 kV nation grid substation is still operational to the east of the power station site.

== See also ==
- Timeline of the UK electricity supply industry
- List of power stations in England
