= South London Electric Supply Corporation =

- Type: Public limited company
- Industry: Energy: Electricity supply
- Predecessor: Lambeth Vestry
- Founded: 4 December 1896
- Defunct: 31 March 1948
- Fate: Nationalisation
- Successor: British Electricity Authority and London Electricity Board
- Headquarters: London
- Area served: Metropolitan Borough of Lambeth
- Services: Electricity supply
- Revenue: £355,529 (1936)

The South London Electric Supply Corporation Limited was a British electricity undertaking. It was established in 1896 to supply electricity to the parish/borough of Lambeth in south London. The corporation owned and operated a power station at Loughborough Junction. From 1925 it formed an association with three other London companies to centralize electricity generation in the new, high thermal efficiency, power station at Barking. The South London Electric Corporation was abolished in March 1948 upon the nationalization of the British electricity supply industry.

== Background ==
The South London Electric Supply Corporation Limited was registered on 4 December 1896 and took over the electricity supply interests of the Lambeth Vestry (later the Metropolitan Borough of Lambeth) in 1897. The vestry had been granted a provisional order by the Board of Trade to supply electricity to the parish of Lambeth in 1892. The Lambeth Electric Lighting Order 1892 was confirmed by Parliament in the Electric Lighting Orders Confirmation (No. 6) Act 1892 (55 & 56 Vict. c. ccxx). The supply area was all the Lambeth Vestry/Metropolitan Borough except small parts in the north and south and the detached part of the parish of Streatham.

The corporation had an authorized capital of £325,000 comprising 65,000 shares of £5 each, there were 594 shareholders in 1898. The corporation built a power station in Bengeworth Road Loughborough Junction (51°27′59″N 0°05′48″W) in the Borough of Lambeth together with a high voltage distribution cable network. Part of the agreement with the vestry was that the corporation would burn dustbin refuse receiving 11½d. per ton destroyed and would provide current for 25 street lights free of charge. Electricity supply started in November 1899.

== Operations ==
=== Management Board ===
The management board of the South London Electric Supply Corporation in 1898 comprised:

- G. Ellis
- B. Fitch
- E. Ironside Bax
- Algenon Turnor
- W. W. Phipps

The company offices were at Bengeworth Road, Loughborough Junction, London.

=== Power station ===
At opening the plant was dual fired by refuse from the Lambeth Vestry and coal to heat water in eight Babcock & Wilcox boilers of 10,000 Ib/hr each.

- 1 x Ferranti vertical cross compound engine driving a 1,200 kW Ferranti alternator
- 1 x Ferranti vertical cross compound engine driving a 1,000 kW Ferranti alternator
- 1 x Yates & Thom vertical cross compound engine driving a 500 kW British Thomson-Houston alternator
- 2 x Ferranti vertical cross compound engine driving a 300 kW Ferranti alternator.

Power was generated at 3,000 volts 50 Hz for distribution.

In 1923, the plant at Loughborough Junction comprised:

- Boilers:
  - Coal fired boilers producing 130,000 lb/h (16.4 kg/s) of steam which supplied:
- Generators:
  - 1 × 250 kW reciprocating engine, alternating current,
  - 1 × 500 kW reciprocating engine, alternating current,
  - 1 × 800 kW reciprocating engine, alternating current,
  - 1 × 900 kW reciprocating engine, alternating current,
  - 1 × 900 kW reciprocating engine, alternating current,
  - 1 × 1,500 kW turbo-alternator, alternating current,
  - 1 × 2,500 kW turbo-alternator, alternating current,

These machines had a total generating capacity of 7,350 kW.

The power station had a single chimney.

The electricity available to customers was:

- 2-phase AC 50 Hz, at 220 volts
- 1-phase AC 50 Hz, at 220 volts.

=== Operational data ===
The following table summaries the growth of the Corporation in terms of capacity of the plant, the electricity load, the amount of current sold, and the number of customers.

South London Corporation operating data, 1901–1936
Year	Capacity of plant, kW	Max load, kW	Electricity generated, MWh	Electricity sold, MWh	No. customers	Connected load, kW	Load factor, per cent
1901	3,300			222			
1902				1,093			
1903	6,000	3,086	5,478	1,453	1,450		28.18
1904				1,786			
1905				1,871			
1906				2,110			
1907			3,413	2,890			
1908			4,062	3,250			
1909			4,727	3,705		7,364	
1913	7,000	3,130	6,318	5,000	2,794	9,600	18.2
1919	7,000	5,102	7,699	7,565	4,365	17,050	16.9
1921		6,000	8,016	8,597		18,300	20.7
1922		6,448	8,036	8,931		19,700	19.6
1923	7,000	7,168	9,000	10,533	6,600	21,300	20.5
1931	0		0	33,904			
1933	0		0	36,057			
1934	0		0	41,944			
1935	0		0	46,105			
1936	0	22,717	0	55,810	33,474	79,126	31.8

Growth in sales of electricity in MWh
Growth in sales of electricity in MWh

The dust destructor was decommissioned in 1900 as fumes caused a local nuisance.

=== Electricity use ===
Electricity was originally used for lighting but ‘power’ uses were soon established. The following table illustrates the changing patterns of use.

End use of electricity, 1921–1936, MWh
Use, MWh	Year					
Use, MWh	1921	1922	1923	1924	1931	1936
Public lighting	112	88	129	88	187	5955
Domestic supply	3,184	3,661	4,529	11,940	33,719	30,480
Power and heat	5,301	5,182	5,875	11,940	33,719	24,734
Traction	0	0	0	0	0	0
Bulk supply	0	0	0	0	0	0
Total	8,597	8,931	10,533	12,028	33,904	55,810

=== Financial statistics ===
The capital required to establish, build and operate the business was raised through the offer of shares. Capital expenditure was needed for the purchase of land, buildings, machinery, mains, transformers, meters, electrical instruments, legal costs, fixtures and furniture at the stations.

The South London Corporation current account revenue was as follows.

The South London Corporation current account revenue, 1901–1908
Year	Revenue from consumers	Profits before interest
1901	£17,571	£1,691
1902	£20,445	£7,366
1903	£25,720	£18,936
1904	£29,230	£31,347
1905	£28,210	£30,134
1906	£28,934	£18,046
1907	£33,992	£15,040
1908	£36,500	£18,000

Share offers were made on several occasions throughout the operating life of the corporation. For example, in 1908 an issue of £100,000 five per cent shares were offered.

The overall revenue, expenses and profit for the South London Electric Supply Corporation were as shown.

South London Corporation current account revenue, 1913–1923
Year	Revenue	Expenditure	Profit
1913	£48,880	£18,697	£26,633
1919	£92,271	£47,440	£40,709
1922	£127,182	£71,732	£60,162
1923	£154,910	£67,581	£92,352
1936	£355,529	£232,629	£122,900

To meet the requirement of increased demand, capital expenditure on new plant and equipment was required, as shown on the table below.

South London Corporation capital expenditure, 1907–1919
Year	1907	1908	1909	1910	1911	1912
Capital expenditure	£18,709	£10,070	£9,272	£17,030	£11,514	£20,065
Year	1914	1915	1916	1917	1918	1919
Capital expenditure	£13,169	£7,512	£5,555	£14,690	£8,665	£10,355

Dividends to shareholders were paid throughout the operational life of the company. Dividends as a percentage of the total capital raised in a given year were as shown, together with the average dividends paid by the London company electricity undertakings.

South London Corporation shareholder dividends, 1900–1919
Year	1900	1901	1902	1903	1904	1905	1906	1907	1908	1909
Dividend %	0	0	1.75	3.00	4.38	4.13	3.27	3.89	5.0	5.0
Average Dividend %	4.60	5.29	5.55	5.51	5.79	5.65	5.40	5.14	5.12	5.07
Year	1910	1911	1912	1913	1914	1915	1916	1917	1918	1919
Dividend %	5.0	5.0	5.36	5.42	5.15	5.07	5.07	5.07	5.07	5.69
Average Dividend %	5.07	5.11	5.18	5.33	5.10	4.87	4.68	5.32	4.96	5.76

=== Joint working ===
The South London Corporation and three other companies in south and east London promoted the London Electricity (No. 1) Act 1925 (14 & 15 Geo. 5. c. lxii). The four companies were: the City of London Electric Lighting Company; the County of London Electric Supply Company Limited; the South London Electric Supply Corporation Limited; and the South Metropolitan Electric Light and Power Company Limited. They established a joint committee to specify how generating stations of each company were operated. The companies remained district electricity supply undertakings; although they were physically joined with interconnecting cables. The companies envisaged that power stations such as Barking would provide enough capacity for their electricity requirements. The Act required equal consideration for the interests of shareholders and consumers. Dividends to shareholders were limited to 7 percent per year and the funds that could be carried forward in the accounts were restricted. Profits above these conditions formed a ‘consumers’ benefit’ in the form of lower prices.

The County of London Company built the 118.75 MW Barking A power station which was commissioned in 1925. This was followed by the 303.5 MW Barking B commissioned from 1933.

Under the terms of the Electricity (Supply) Act 1926 (16 & 17 Geo. 5. c. 51) the Central Electricity Board (CEB) was established. The CEB identified high efficiency ‘selected’ power stations that would supply electricity most effectively. The CEB also constructed the national grid (1927–33) to connect power stations within a region.

These interconnections and those provided by the national grid enabled the bulk transfer of electricity. In 1929 the South London Corporation decommissioned the Bengeworth Road power station and purchased its electricity needs (38,593 MWh in 1931) from the Central Electricity Board).

== Nationalization ==
The British electricity supply industry was nationalised in 1948 under the provisions of the Electricity Act 1947 (10 & 11 Geo. 6. c. 54). The South London Electric Supply Corporation undertaking was abolished, ownership of bulk supply substations and transmission were vested in the British Electricity Authority, and subsequently the Central Electricity Authority and the Central Electricity Generating Board (CEGB). At the same time the electricity distribution and sales responsibilities of the South London Electric Supply Corporation electricity undertaking were transferred to the London Electricity Board (LEB).

== See also ==
- Timeline of the UK electricity supply industry
- London Power Company
- City of London Electric Lighting Company
- County of London Electric Supply Company
- South Metropolitan Electric Light and Power Company
- Charing Cross and Strand Electricity Supply Corporation
