= City of London Electric Lighting Company =

British electricity undertaking

City of London Electric Lighting Company Limited
- Company type: Privately held company
- Industry: Electricity generation and supply
- Predecessor: City of London (Pioneer) Electric Lighting Company
- Founded: 11 July 1891
- Defunct: 31 March 1948
- Fate: Nationalisation
- Successor: British Electricity Authority
- Headquarters: Falcon House, Aldersgate Street, City of London EC1
- Area served: City of London and St Saviour's Southwark
- Key people: see text
- Products: AC & DC electricity supplies, electric lighting, sale and rental of domestic and commercial electrical goods
- Revenue: see tables

The City of London Electric Lighting Company Limited (CLELCo) was a British electricity undertaking. It was formed in July 1891 to generate and supply electricity to the City of London and part of northern Southwark. It owned and operated Bankside power station on the south bank of the river Thames. The company provided and stimulated demand for electricity, increased its generating capacity, and competed and co-operated with other electricity undertakings in London. The company was dissolved on 1 April 1948 when the British electricity industry was nationalised.

== History ==
In 1889 the Corporation of London invited tenders from electrical plant manufacturers to provide electric lighting throughout the 1.25 square miles of City of London. The Laing, Wharton and Down Construction Syndicate undertook to supply the eastern district of the City and the Anglo-American Brush Electrical Engineering Company to supply the central and western districts. Provisional orders were obtained under the Electric Lighting Act 1888 (51 & 52 Vict. c. 12); these enabled any company or person to supply electricity and to install a system of supply. The Laing syndicate built a power station in the City at Wool Quay between the Custom House and the Tower of London and the Brush company a power station at Meredith Wharf on Bankside on the south bank of the Thames. The Wool Quay site had little space for expansion and the generating station was closed in 1893, the equipment was sold or transferred to Bankside. The two contractors obtained consent from the Board of Trade to transfer their contracts to a new company formed on 5 February 1891 called the City of London (Pioneer) Electric Lighting Company with a capital of £50,000. Supplies of direct current electricity for street lamps in Queen Victoria Street commenced from Bankside power station on 25 June 1891.

== Formation ==
The City of London Electric Lighting Company Limited was formed on 11 July 1891 with a capital of £800,000. The assets of the City of London (Pioneer) Electric Lighting Company were transferred to the new company for £95,000, the company also purchased the provisional orders of the Laing syndicate and the Brush company.

=== Legal powers ===
City of London Electric Lighting Act 1893
- Act of Parliament
- Parliament of the United Kingdom
- Long title: An Act for amending the City of London Electric Lighting (Brush) Order 1890 and the City of London (East District) Electric Lighting Order 1890 as confirmed by the Electric Lighting Orders Confirmation (No. 15) Act 1890 and the City of London Electric Lighting (Brush) Order 1891 as confirmed by the Electric Lighting Orders Confirmation (No. 10) Act 1891.
- Citation: 56 & 57 Vict. c. lxxxv

Dates
- Royal assent: 29 June 1893

Text of statute as originally enacted

The company's legal powers were the City of London Electric Lighting (Brush) Order 1890 and the City of London Electric Lighting (Brush) Order 1891; the Southwark Electric Lighting Order 1891; the City of London Electric Lighting Act 1893 (56 & 57 Vict. c. lxxxv); the City of London Electric Lighting Act 1900 (63 & 64 Vict. c. lxxxviii); the London Electric Supply Act 1908 (8 Edw. 7. c. clxvii); and the London Electricity (No. 1) Act 1925 (15 & 16 Geo. 5. c. lxii).

=== Premises ===
The company's head office from 1896-1923 was at 1 & 2 Great Winchester Street, London EC2 and at Falcon House, Aldersgate Street, London EC1 from 1924-48. The electricity generation station was at 64 Bankside, London SE1. In the late 1930s CLELCo had a showroom at 33 Ludgate Hill London EC4.

== Operation ==
=== Growth of demand ===
The first alternating current supply for private consumers commenced on 14 December 1891 from Bankside power station. Between December 1891 and July 1892, 271 miles of electricity mains had been laid in the city, causing considerable disruption. By the mid-1890s demand for electric lighting in the City was increasing by about 1,000 additional electric lamps per week. The sub-station at St Benet Fink, for example, supplied the Bank of England, the Royal Exchange and the banks in Lombard Street. In October 1894 there were 13,000 lamps connected to this sub-station, by October 1896 there were 22,500, an increase of about 5,000 per year or doubling every three years. In 1896 the company had 5,303 customers as well as public lighting including thirteen miles of streets within the City. By the end of 1899 the company were supplying 430,000 incandescent lamps plus 540 arc lamps for street lighting.

In addition the company rented out a range of electrical appliances including kettles, saucepans, irons and hotplates. An electric oven could be hired for between 7 and 12 shillings per quarter (£1=20 shillings), normally retailing at £7 to £14. In 1894 the company charged 4d. per unit (1 kWh) for electricity for cooking, half of the standard change of 8d. per unit (£1=240d.). The company had a scheme of free installation of wiring and fittings for a moderate rental charge.

Sales of electricity more than doubled in the nine years between 1904 (14 GWh) and 1913 (29 GWh). The average price the company charged from electricity fell from 7.56 d./kWh in 1895, to 4.09 d./kWh in 1900, 2.75 d./kWh in 1905, and 2.27 d./kWh in 1915. Electricity demand remained constant during the World War I but increased again over the following two decades. In 1937 the CLELCo's street lighting supply was the cheapest in London at 0.633 d./kWh and its private electricity supply (1.735 d./kWh) was the third lowest in the capital; the private supply of the South Metropolitan Company was 1.294 d./kWh and the London Power Company charged 1.676 d./kWh.

World War II had a significant impact on the company. On the night of 29/30 December 1940 Bankside lost some of its ancillary plant from 'Blitz' bombing, but the main generating plant was undamaged. By the morning the destruction of buildings in the City was such that 40 per cent of the company's connected load had disappeared. It was estimated that the premises of 2,500 consumers had been destroyed and the cost to the CLELCo in lost revenue was estimated at about £100,000 per annum. The years 1942-44 were the only ones when the company did not pay its shareholders a seven per cent dividend.

=== Capital expenditure ===
To meet the requirement of increased demand, capital expenditure on new plant and equipment was required, as shown on the table below.

City of London Electric Lighting Company capital expenditure, 1907–1919.
Year	1907	1908	1909	1910	1911	1912
Capital expenditure	87,382	45,535	59,088	50,531	46,043	45,509
Generated Units(MWh)	26.394					
Year	1914	1915	1916	1917	1918	1919
Capital expenditure	61,939	25,952	7,775	5,839	5,072	28,596

=== Revenue ===
CLELCo's net revenue (revenue from supply of electricity less operating costs) over the period 1892-1916
CLELCo's net revenue over the period 1917–1936
CLELCo's net revenue over the period 1936–1946
CLELCo's working costs over the period 1917–1936
CLELCo's working costs over the period 1937–1946

==== Shareholder dividends ====
Dividends to shareholders were paid throughout the operational life of the company. Dividends as a percentage of the total capital raised in a given year were as shown, together with the average dividends paid by the London company electricity undertakings.

Shareholder dividends, 1892–1919
Year	1892	1893	1894	1895	1896	1897	1898	1899	1900	1901	1902	1903	1904	1905
Dividend %	0	2.24	4.19	5.24	5.95	6.93	5.74	4.86	2.91	5.10	5.14	5.14	5.53	5.53
Average dividend %	2.10	2.68	3.40	4.01	4.66	5.54	5.10	5.15	4.60	5.29	5.55	5.51	5.79	5.65
Year	1906	1907	1908	1909	1910	1911	1912	1913	1914	1915	1916	1917	1918	1919
Dividend %	5.53	5.53	5.53	5.92	5.92	6.31	6.70	7.10	6.70	6.31	6.31	6.31	6.31	8.27
Average dividend %	5.40	5.14	5.12	5.07	5.07	5.11	5.18	5.33	5.10	4.87	4.68	5.32	4.96	5.76

=== Competition and co-operation ===
Until 1899 the company had a monopoly of electricity supply to the City of London. A Board of Trade inquiry into competition in 1899 resulted in a provisional order being granted to the Charing Cross and Strand Electricity Supply Corporation to supply electricity in competition with the CLELCo. The City of London Electric Lighting Act 1900 authorised the construction of a generating station at Bow.

The Electricity (Supply) Act 1919 permitted undertakings to exchange electricity supplies, to work together or amalgamate. The CLELCo and three companies in south and east London – the County of London Electric Supply Company Limited; the South London Electric Supply Corporation Limited; and the South Metropolitan Electric Light and Power Company Limited – promoted the London Electricity (No. 1) Act 1925. A joint committee was established to direct the way in which the generating stations of each company were operated. The companies remained distinct electricity generation and supply undertakings, but were physically connected with interconnecting cables to exchange electricity.

In 1923 Bankside power station, rated at 64 MW, had the largest generating capacity of any of the electricity companies or municipal undertakings in the London area. The County of London Company had a generating capacity of 39.7 MW; it commissioned the first 100 MW of its Barking ‘A’ power station in 1925, this increased to 200 MW by 1930. The 1919 Act established the principle of equal consideration for the interests of shareholders and consumers of each company. Dividends to shareholders were limited to seven per cent per annum and the amount carried forward in the accounts was also restricted. Profits over and above these conditions formed a ‘consumers’ benefit’ in the form of lower prices. Two-thirds of the consumer's benefit was to consumers and one sixth each for the company's employees and for the shareholders.

Electricity grid interconnections in the 1930s, stimulated by the Electricity (Supply) Act 1926, supported the further commercial integration of the ‘No.1 group’. In 1937 a quadripartite agreement was made between members of the group. The agreement “in the interests of consumers of electricity” was to establish a joint committee; to institute a common commercial procedure; to unify methods of charging consumers; and to avoid duplication and conflicting systems of supply mains involving unnecessary expenditure. The agreement envisaged the establishment of joint showroom premises to promote the use of electricity. In the late 1930s the CLELCo had a showroom at 33 Ludgate Hill in the City of London.

The company continued to sell electricity to other undertakings, and in the mid-1930s was supplying most of the electricity to north Southwark. In the financial year 1931/32 the CLELCo supplied 2.17 GWh to Southwark Metropolitan Council, by 1936 this had increased to 13.92 GWh or about 9.5 per cent of the electricity generated at Bankside. The company continued to promote the use of electricity. In May 1938 it took over the management of the Finsbury and Holborn areas of the County of London Company. The CLELCo undertook to provide free wiring to the Peabody Buildings in Finsbury and Holborn but on condition that all gas lighting was removed. It estimated that the cost of providing electricity for 1,263 flats would be £10,000 but that revenue from lighting alone would be £3,000 per annum and more if tenants used electricity for cooking and heating. This scheme was a joint venture between the CLELCo and the County of London Electric Supply Company.

=== Land acquisition ===
The CLELCo expanded its site on Bankside to provided for new generating equipment; from the mid-1890s until the late-1930s the company purchased and acquired surrounding properties and land.

In 1897 the company purchased and demolished a row of shops and residential properties on the north side of Sumner Street Southwark adjacent to Bankside power station. This enabled the company to build an extension to the engine house bringing the building line to Sumner Street.

In 1900 the company obtained an act of Parliament, the City of London Electric Lighting Act 1900 (63 & 64 Vict. c. lxxxviii), to compulsorily purchase surrounding properties and to divert local roads such as Pike Gardens. Some protection of working class housing was provided for in the act: the company were obliged to erect "artizan's or workmen’s dwelling-houses" sufficient for 200 people within St Saviour's district of Southwark. The company also bought adjacent local properties as they came onto the market: in 1904 the company paid £600 for the freehold of the property at Nos. 15, 16 & 17 Noah's Ark Alley adjacent to the power station.

The company raised further capital by issuing 400,000 additional £1 shares in 1931, by this time there were about 4,000 shareholders. In the late-1930s the opportunity arose to purchase two large plots of land adjacent to Bankside power station. In December 1936, the Central Electricity Board (CEB) directed the company to purchase land owned by the City of London Corporation to the east of Bankside. This amounted to 44,900 square feet (0.417 ha) at a price of £34,520. The site was of interest to the CEB for a possible extension of Bankside power station, not only to meet the electricity load of the CLELCo but also to provide electricity for other parts of London. The CEB proposed a 180 MW generating station on the extended site. In June 1938 the opportunity arose to purchase 79,000 square feet (0.734 ha) of land immediately to the west of Bankside power station. This land had belonged to the South Metropolitan Gas Company. The additional land would enable the construction of a larger 250 MW power station on the site. The CEB directed the company to purchase the land at a price not exceeding £120,000. The auction took place on 23 June 1938, and the manager of the CLELCo wrote to the Electricity Commissioners saying that he had been able to purchase the land for £45,000 “which is considerably less than my advisers and I expected to pay”. The company drew up plans, and ordered equipment, for a new 240 MW power station eventually built as Bankside B.

== Nationalisation ==
The company opposed the government's nationalisation of the British electricity industry. Representatives of the industry met with the Minister of Fuel and Power in December 1945 to discuss the implications of nationalisation. A company board meeting in January 1946 noted that “the London Companies should combine to oppose the Government’s nationalization proposals”. As a result of the Electricity Act 1947 on 1 April 1948 most of the private and municipal electricity undertakings and statutory bodies including the CLELCo and the CEB were dissolved. Ownership of all public supply power stations and the national grid was vested in the British Electricity Authority. The London Electricity Board became the owners of the local distribution system and the local showrooms as well as being the face of the electricity industry for consumers in London.

== Key people ==
The CLELCo's articles provided for a minimum of three and a maximum of ten directors. The original financial qualification was £1,000, and their fee was £3,000 per annum. The fee was increased to £4,000 in 1923 and to £5,000 in 1930. Between 1934 and 1948 the qualification was 1,000 shares and the fees were £5,000 per annum.

General Managers

- J. Cecil Bull, 1896–1905
- A. F. Harrison, 1930–1934
- Henry John Randall (born 30 December 1894 London, died 5 May 1967 Buckinghamshire), 1936–39

Joint Managing Directors

- P. D. Tuckett, Frank Bailey and J. Cecil Bull, 1908–11
- P. D. Tuckett, Marquess of Winchester, and Sir David Lionel Salomons, 1915
- P. D. Tuckett, Marquess of Winchester, Sir David Lionel Salomons, Frank Bailey, and J. Cecil Bull, 1917–23
- P. D. Tuckett, Marquess of Winchester, Frank Bailey, and J. Cecil Bull, 1926–28

Managing Directors

- J. Cecil Bull, 1930–31
- Henry John Randall, 1940–48 (Chairman of the London Electricity Board 1948–1956)

Chairmen

- Sir David Lionel Salomons, 1896–1900
- G. Herring, 1901–06
- J. B. Braithwaite, 1907–35
- P. D. Tuckett, 1936–48

Engineers

- Frank Bailey, 1896–1928
- C. G. Cutbush, 1936
- E. Harlow (Generation), A. G. Kemsley (Distribution), 1938–40
- R. Pearce (Station Superintendent), G. H. Fowler (Distribution Superintendent), 1946–1948

Secretary

- Henry John Randall, 1931–1936

Architect Bankside B

- Sir Giles Gilbert Scott

Consultant Engineer Bankside B

- Sir Standen Leonard Pearce (Electricity Commissioner and Engineer-in-chief to the London Power Company)

== See also ==
- Bankside Power Station
- List of pre-nationalisation UK electric power companies
- Timeline of the UK electricity supply industry
- London Power Company
- County of London Electric Supply Company
- Central Electricity Board
- Central Electricity Authority
- London Electricity Board
- National Grid
