= Sir Harry Renwick, 1st Baronet =

Sir Harry Benedetto Renwick, 1st Baronet, KBE (13 June 1861 – 7 January 1932) was a British businessman and public servant. An electricity industry executive, during the First World War he was the Director of Feeding Stuffs Department at the Ministry of Food.

Renwick was created a Knight Commander of the Order of the British Empire (KBE) in 1920 "for services in connection with the War" and a Baronet, of Coombe in the County of Surrey, in the 1927 Birthday Honours.

Renwick died in 1932. His son Robert succeeded to the baronetcy and was created Baron Renwick in 1964.

Baronetage of the United Kingdom
Preceded by New creation	Baronet (of Coombe); 1927–1932	Succeeded by Robert Renwick
