= Baron Renwick =

Barony in the Peerage of the United Kingdom

Baron Renwick, of Coombe in the County of Surrey, is a title in the Peerage of the United Kingdom. It was created on 23 December 1964 for the businessman and public servant, Sir Robert Renwick, 2nd Baronet. He notably worked for the Air Ministry and the Ministry of Aircraft Production during the Second World War. The Renwick baronetcy, of Coombe in the County of Surrey, was created in the Baronetage of the United Kingdom on 28 June 1927 for his father, Harry Renwick. As of 2020 the titles are held by the first Baron's grandson, the third Baron, who succeeded in that year. The second baron was active in the House of Lords until the House of Lords Act 1999, when he lost his seat in parliament.

== Renwick baronets, of Coombe (1927) ==
- Sir Harry Benedetto Renwick, 1st Baronet (1861–1932)
- Sir Robert Burnham Renwick, 2nd Baronet (1904–1973) (created Baron Renwick in 1964)

== Baron Renwick (1964) ==
- Robert Burnham Renwick, 1st Baron Renwick (1904–1973)
- Harry Andrew Renwick, 2nd Baron Renwick (1935–2020)
- Robert James Renwick, 3rd Baron Renwick (born 1966)

The heir presumptive and sole heir to the titles is the present holder's younger brother, the Hon. Michael David Renwick (born 1968)

Coat of arms of Baron Renwick
Crest A thunderbolt Or. Escutcheon Argent a husbandsman in the act of sowing Proper on a chief Azure a thunderbolt between two bulls heads caboshed Or. Supporters Dexter a black poodle Proper sinister a tabby cat Proper. Motto Laborare Est Orare (To Work Is To Pray)
