= James Renwick =

James Renwick may refer to:

- Jim Renwick (born 1952), Scottish rugby player
- Jim Renwick (politician) (1917–1984), politician in Ontario, Canada
- James Renwick (climate scientist), New Zealand weather and climate researcher
- James Renwick (Covenanter) (1662–1688), Scottish Covenanter
- James Renwick (physicist) (1790–1863), English-American scientist and engineer
- James Renwick Jr. (1818–1895), American architect, son of the physicist
- James Renwick (Iowa politician), mayor of Davenport, 1869
