= London Electricity Board =

British electricity supplier (1947–1993)

London Electricity
- Industry: Electricity
- Founded: 1948
- Defunct: 1998
- Fate: Acquired
- Successor: EDF Energy
- Headquarters: London, UK

The London Electricity Board was the public sector utility company responsible for the supply and distribution of electricity to domestic, commercial and industrial consumers in London prior to 1990. It also sold and made available for hire and hire-purchase domestic electrical appliances through local showrooms where electricity bills could also be paid. It was shortened to LEB in its green and blue logo, consisting of the three letters. As London Electricity plc it was listed on the London Stock Exchange and was once a constituent of the FTSE 100 Index.

== History ==
The board was formed as the London Electricity Board (LEB) on 1 April 1948 as part of the nationalisation of the electricity industry by the Electricity Act 1947. The LEB was privatised in 1990 under the Electricity Act 1989, as London Electricity plc.

The company was acquired by Entergy, a US company, in 1996 and then by Électricité de France in November 1998. It then traded under the name EDF Energy Networks as did the South Eastern and Eastern distribution companies also owned by EDF, until EDF sold them all under the name UK Power Networks to Hong Kong based investors in 2010.

Notable employees of the business include former prime minister John Major and the former archbishop of Canterbury, George Carey.

=== Chairmen of the LEB ===
- 1948–1956, Henry John Randall (born 30 December 1894 London, died 5 May 1967 Buckinghamshire), previously managing director of the City of London Electric Lighting Company.
- 1956–1968, David Blair Irving (born 9 November 1903, died 9 June 1986)
- 1968–1972, Wilfrid David Drysdale Fenton (born 27 March 1908, died 4 May 1985)
- 1972–1976, Owen Francis (born 4 October 1912, died 26 July 2005)
- 1976–1981, Alan Plumpton (born 24 November 1926)
- 1981–1986, David G Jefferies
- 1986–1990, John Wilson

Other members of the board were: Deputy Chairman C.G. Moss (1964, 1967), Full-time member C.A.F. Beaumont (1964, 1967).

=== Customers ===
The total number of customers supplied by the board were:

London Electricity Board customers, 1948–89
Year	1948/9	1960/1	1965/6	1970/1	1975/6	1978/9	1980/1	1985/6	1987/8	1988/9
No. of customers, 1,000s	1482	1787	1848	1849	1844	1872	1787	1849	1887	1909

=== Existing electricity suppliers taken over at nationalisation ===
The Electricity (Allocation of Undertakings to Area Boards) Order 1948 (SI 1948/484) transferred the electricity business of the following local authorities and private companies to the new board effective 31 March 1948.

==== Local authorities ====
- Barking Corporation
- Barnes Corporation
- Battersea Borough Council
- Beckenham Corporation
- Bermondsey Borough Council
- Bethnal Green Borough Council
- Bexley Corporation
- Bromley Corporation
- Dartford Corporation
- East Ham Corporation
- Erith Corporation
- Fulham Borough Council
- Hackney Borough Council
- Hammersmith Borough Council
- Hampstead Borough Council
- llford Corporation
- Islington Borough Council
- Leyton Corporation
- Poplar Borough Council
- St. Marylebone Borough Council
- St. Pancras Borough Council
- Shoreditch Borough Council
- Southwark Borough Council
- Stepney Borough Council
- Stoke Newington Borough Council
- Walthamstow Corporation
- West Ham Corporation
- Willesden Corporation
- Wimbledon Corporation
- Woolwich Borough Council

==== Private companies ====
- Central London Electricity
- Chislehurst Electric Supply Company
- City of London Electric Lighting Company
- County of London Electric Supply Company
- Foots Cray Electricity Supply Company
- London Electric Supply Corporation
- London Power Company
- Notting Hill Electric Lighting Company
- South London Electric Supply Corporation
- South Metropolitan Electric Light and Power Company

== Electricity sales ==
Electricity sold, in GWh, by the LEB over its operational life

== See also ==
- List of pre-nationalisation UK electric power companies
- EDF Energy
