= Robert Renwick, 1st Baron Renwick =

British industrialist (1904–1973)

Robert Burnham Renwick, 1st Baron Renwick, KBE (4 October 1904 – 30 August 1973), known as Sir Robert Renwick, 2nd Baronet, from 1932 to 1964, was a British industrialist and public servant.

Renwick was the only son of Sir Harry Renwick, 1st Baronet, and his wife Frederica Louisa (née Laing). His father was head of County of London Electric Supply Ltd., the electric power utility for London. Robert succeeded in the baronetcy in 1932, and became head of County of London Electric in 1939.

During the Second World War he held several important offices. He was Controller of Communications at the Air Ministry and of Communications Equipment at the Ministry of Aircraft Production from 1942 to 1945. He also served as Chairman of the Airborne Forces Committee from 1943 to 1945. In 1947 the Labour Government nationalized Renwick's power companies under the Electricity Act 1947.

Renwick turned his attention to broadcasting. He was extremely influential in commercial television in the United Kingdom, and saw a good return from his television interests. He was chairperson of British Wireless and Television. On 23 December 1964 he was raised to the peerage as Baron Renwick, of Coombe in the County of Surrey.

== Family ==
Lord Renwick married, firstly, Dorothy Mary, daughter of Harold Parkes, in 1929. They were divorced in 1953.

He married, secondly, Joan, daughter of Sir Reginald Clarke and widow of John Ogilvie Spencer, in 1953.

He died in August 1973, aged 68, and was succeeded in his titles by his only son from his first marriage, Harry. His daughter Jennifer was the first wife of oarsman and printer Antony Rowe.

== Arms ==
Coat of arms of Robert Renwick, 1st Baron Renwick
Crest A thunderbolt Or. Escutcheon Argent a husbandsman in the act of sowing Proper on a chief Azure a thunderbolt between two bulls heads caboshed Or. Supporters Dexter a black poodle Proper sinister a tabby cat Proper. Motto Aborare Est Orare (To Work Is To Pray)

== Notes ==
Cultural offices
Preceded by John Fleming	President of the Television Society; 1945–1954	Succeeded by Vincent de Ferranti
Peerage of the United Kingdom
New creation	Baron Renwick; 1964–1973	Succeeded by Harry Andrew Renwick
Baronetage of the United Kingdom
Preceded by Harry Benedetto Renwick	Baronet (of Coombe); 1932–1973	Succeeded by Harry Andrew Renwick
