= Magnox (disambiguation) =

Magnox is a type of nuclear reactor.

Magnox can also refer to:

- Magnox (alloy), an aluminum-magnesium alloy used for fuel cladding in Magnox type reactors
- Magnox Ltd, a company that operates Magnox nuclear power stations in the United Kingdom
- Magnox, the working title of an early draft of the television series Edge of Darkness
