= Hinkley Point B nuclear power station =

Offline nuclear power plant located in Somerset, England

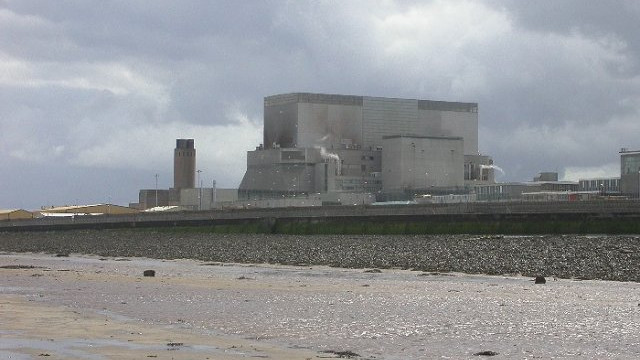
- Hinkley Point B seen from the beach
- Country: United Kingdom
- Location: Hinkley Point, Somerset, England
- Coordinates: 51.2090°N 3.1275°W
- Status: Being decommissioned
- Construction began: 1 September 1967
- Commission date: Unit B1: 30 October 1976; Unit B2: 5 February 1976
- Decommission date: 1 August 2022 (Unit B1 shutdown); 6 July 2022 (Unit B2 shutdown)
- Owners: Central Electricity Generating Board (1976–1989); Nuclear Electric (1989–1996); British Energy (1996–2009); EDF Energy (2009–2026); Nuclear Decommissioning Authority (2026–present)
- Operator: Nuclear Restoration Services

Nuclear power station
- Reactor type: GCR - AGR
- Reactor supplier: General Electric Company, Whessoe, and Strachan & Henshaw (Graphite supplied by Anglo Great Lakes Corporation Ltd)
- Cooling source: Bridgwater Bay
- Thermal capacity: 2 x 1494 MW_{t}
- Total electricity generated: 295.85 TWh (1,065.1 PJ)

Power generation
- Make and model: AGR
- Units decommissioned: 1 x 480 MW_{e} + 1 x 485 MW_{e} (Reference); 2 x 625 MW_{e} (Design); 2 x 655 MW_{e} (Gross)
- Nameplate capacity: 1250 MW_{e}
- Capacity factor: Unit B1: 76.4% (lifetime); Unit B2: 73.2% (lifetime)
- Annual net output: 4802.18 GWh (2021)

External links
- Website: Hinkley B nuclear powr station | EDF
- Commons: Related media on Commons

Hinkley Point B nuclear power station was a nuclear power station near Bridgwater, Somerset, on the Bristol Channel coast of south west England. It was the first commercial Advanced Gas Cooled reactor to generate power to the National Grid in 1976 and shares its design with sister station Hunterston B nuclear power station. It ceased operations permanently on 1 August 2022. As of December 2025, defuelling of the reactors is complete.

== History ==
The construction of Hinkley Point B, which was undertaken by a consortium known as The Nuclear Power Group (TNPG), started in 1967. The reactors vessels were supplied by Whessoe, reactor machinery was supplied by Strachan & Henshaw and the turbines by GEC.

Hinkley Point B cost £78.5 million, (equivalent to £1.28 billion in 2025) with an original intended design life of 25 years.

In March 1971, it was announced that there would be a six-month delay in completion due to problems with the insulation of the concrete pressure vessel. In place of the stainless steel mesh and foil insulation that had been used on previous Magnox stations, a fibrous type of insulation supplied by Delaney Gallay, part of the Lindustries Group, had been used for the first time. During pre-operational trials, before the nuclear fuel was loaded, high levels of acoustic vibration in the gas circuit were found to be damaging the insulation tiles, and the retention plates which held the insulation in place had to be redesigned and modified within the reactor.

During further pre-operational testing, severe vibration of the fuel channel gags was detected. The fuel channel gags are valves which are gradually closed to restrict the flow of gas through a fuel channel in order to maintain the channel gas outlet temperature as the nuclear fuel is used up. Modifications to produce a fluidically generated bias force to stop the gags vibrating took time to design, test and implement, delaying the planned start up date. The station began generating electricity on 5 February 1976.

It was taken over by Nuclear Electric as part of the privatisation of the UK Electricity Supply Industry in 1990, though remaining in public ownership at that time. In 1996, the AGR and PWR assets of Nuclear Electric and Scottish Nuclear were privatised as part of British Energy.

In 2006, the station's reactors were shut down in order to inspect the boilers for weld defects that had been found in power stations using similar boiler designs. Due to its age, on 16 August 2006 the company warned that until a decision was made over whether to extend its usable life it would operate at a maximum of 70 per cent load. Both reactors were subsequently restarted generating 420 MW each, roughly 70% of full capacity. The number 4 reactor was cleared for restart by the Nuclear Installations Inspectorate on 11 May 2007. The power station's closure date was 2023 for a time, before it closed a year earlier.

In July 2013, EDF Energy announced that the load on both of the station reactors had been increased to 80 per cent, resulting in an output of around 485-500 MWe per reactor up from 70% load, where it had been generating around 420 MWe per reactor since 2006.

Hinkley Point B was the last of four nuclear power stations in the area to cease operations. Three Magnox power stations being decommissioned are the adjacent Hinkley Point A, and Oldbury nuclear power station and Berkeley nuclear power station on the banks of the River Severn.

In October 2016, it was announced that super-articulated control rods would be installed in the reactor because of concerns about the stability of the reactors' graphite cores. The Office for Nuclear Regulation (ONR) had raised concerns over the number of fractures in keyways that lock together the graphite bricks in the core. An unusual event, such as an earthquake, might destabilise the graphite so that ordinary control rods that shut the reactor down could not be inserted. Super-articulated control rods should be insertable even into a destabilised core.

== Specification ==
The station is of the advanced gas-cooled reactor (AGR) type with two 1,600 MWt reactors, each with their own 660 MWe steam turbine generator set giving a combined maximum design generating capacity of 1,250 MW. As of 2013, it provided over 1% of the UK's total power output.

Hinkley Point B is also equipped with four 17.5 MW Rolls-Royce Olympus industrial gas turbines. Installed in 1970/71, and originally used for 'peak lopping', these are now used exclusively as emergency standby generators for the station.

=== Comparison with Hinkley Point A ===
A comparison with Hinkley Point A is shown below. See also comparison of Hinkley Point A, B and C

| Parameter | Hinkley Point B | Hinkley Point A |
|---|---|---|
| Output of Main Turbines | 2 x 660 MW 1,250 MW | 6 x 93.5 MW 500 MW |
| Area of Main Station | 8.1 ha (20 acres) | 16.2 ha (40 acres) |
| Fuel Per Reactor | 122 t (120 tons) | 355 t (349 tons) |
| Fuel | Uranium Oxide slightly enriched in ceramic form | Natural Uranium |
| Fuel Cans | Stainless Steel | Magnox |
| Fuel Surface Temperature | about 825 °C (1,517 °F) | about 430 °C (806 °F) |
| CO2 Pressure | 41.4 bar g (600 lb/in2 g) | 12.7 bar g (185 lb/in2 g) |
| CO2 Channel Outlet Temperature | 665 °C (1,229 °F) | 387 °C (729 °F) |
| Number of Channels per Reactor | 308 | 4,500 |
| Total Weight of Graphite per Core | 1,199 t (1,180 tons) | 1,891 t (1,861 tons) |
| Steam Conditions Turbine Stop Valve HP | 160 bar g (2318 lb/in2 g) 538 °C (1,000 °F) | 45.5 bar g (660 lb/in2 g) 363 °C (685 °F) |
| Steam Conditions Turbine Stop Valve IP/Reheat | Reheat 38.9 bar g (565 lb/in2 g) 538 °C (1,000 °F) | IP 12.7 bar g (183 lb/in2 g) 354 °C (669 °F) |

=== Capacity and output ===
The generating capacity, electricity output, load factor and thermal efficiency was as shown in the table.

| Year | Net capability, MW | Electricity supplied, GWh | Load as per cent of capability, % | Thermal efficiency, % |
|---|---|---|---|---|
| 1979 | 932 | 3,342.941 | 63.8 | 35.23 |
| 1981 | 1,134 | 5,540.628 | 62.6 | 37.17 |
| 1982 | 1,134 | 5,810.483 | 63.8 | 37.22 |
| 1984 | 1,040 | 7,406.767 | 81.1 | 37.68 |

== Closure ==
On 19 November 2020, EDF announced that Hinkley point B would stop generating electricity and move into the defuelling phase no later than 15 July 2022.

"Running a nuclear power plant this efficiently for over 40 years leads to changes in the reactors. Our inspections of Hinkley’s reactor cores this year show that the graphite blocks are in exactly the sort of condition we predicted they would be at this stage in the station’s lifetime. As a responsible operator we feel it is now the right thing to do to give clarity to our staff, partners and community about the future life of the station, which is why we have made this proactive decision. I would like to pay tribute to all those associated with Hinkley Point B for their outstanding professionalism and wish them well with the next chapter."

— Matt Sykes, Managing Director of EDF Generation

The plant has operated for 45 years and produced over 300 TWh over its lifetime. Reactor B-8 was shut down in July 2022, followed by reactor B-7 in August. EDF said that the defueling process could take a few years, then the site will be given to the Nuclear Decommissioning Authority for decommissioning.

In September 2024, the Office for Nuclear Regulation announced that defuelling of the first reactor had been completed. Defuelling was completed by December 2025.

On 1 October 2026, Hinkley point B officially transferred to Nuclear Restoration Services (NRS) to carry out its 85 year decommissioning program.

== Hinkley Point C ==
A new 3,260 MW Hinkley Point C nuclear power station, consisting of two EPR reactors, was given planning consent on 19 March 2013. A guaranteed "strike price" of £92.50 per megawatt-hour (to be indexed for inflation over 45 years) was announced on 21 October 2013. The new power station would see Hinkley's contribution to the country's power supply rise to 7%. At the time of the planning consent, the price for electric energy on the wholesale market was around £45 per megawatt-hour while the new power plant was expected to need earnings of £90 per megawatt-hour in order to break even.

On 8 October 2014, the EU gave its consent to the 'Contract for Difference (CFD)' that guarantees the "strike price".

== See also ==
- Energy in the United Kingdom
- Energy policy of the United Kingdom
- Energy use and conservation in the United Kingdom
- Hinkley Point A nuclear power station
- James L. Gray
