= Berkeley nuclear power station =

Decommissioned nuclear power plant in England

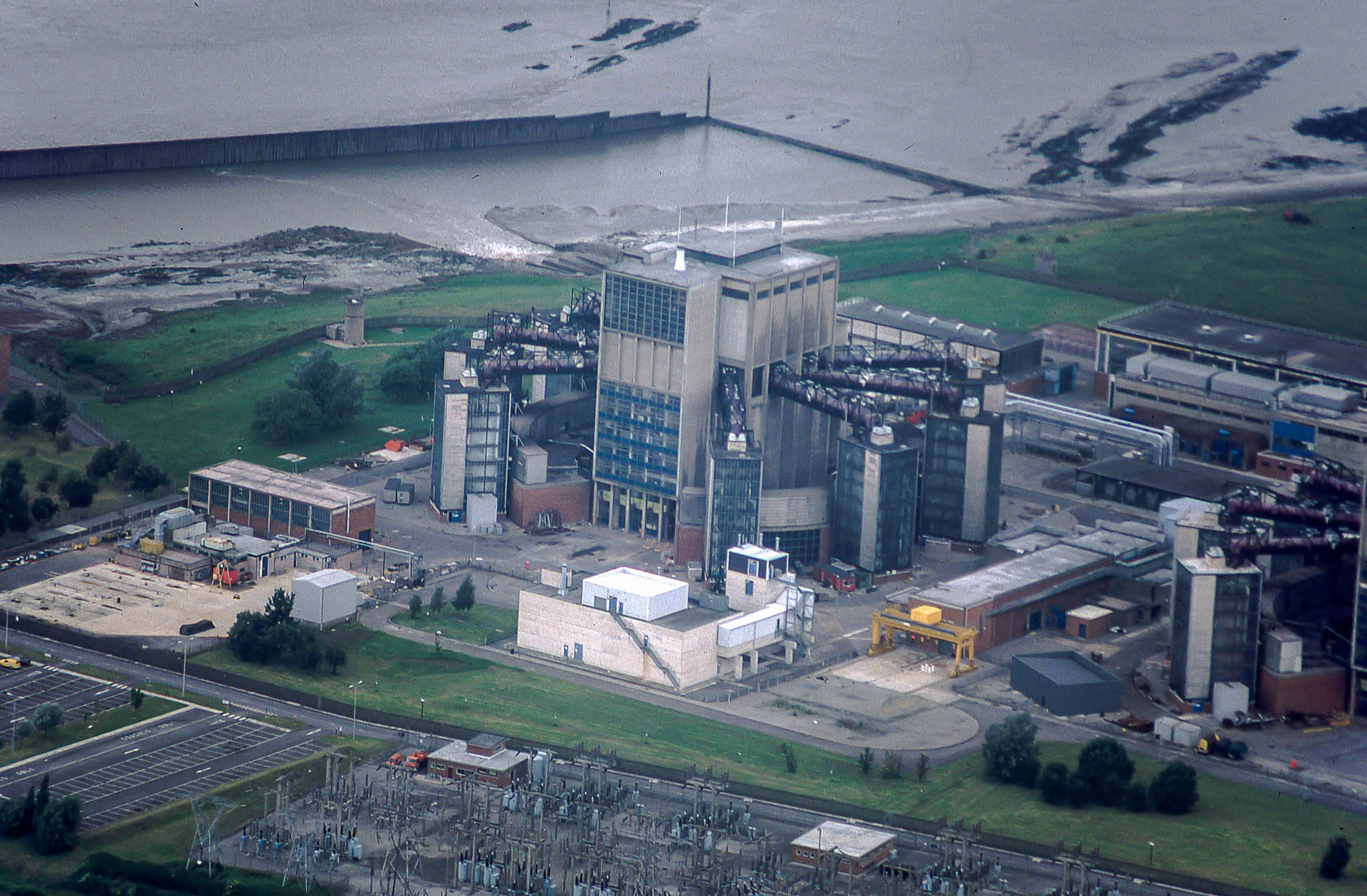
- One of the two reactor blocks in 1981
- Country: England
- Location: Gloucestershire, South West England
- Coordinates: 51.6925°N 2.4936°W
- Status: Decommissioning in progress
- Construction began: 1956
- Commission date: 1962
- Decommission date: 1989
- Owner: Nuclear Decommissioning Authority
- Operator: Nuclear Restoration Services

Nuclear power station
- Reactors: 2
- Reactor type: Magnox

Thermal power station
- Primary fuel: Nuclear
- Cooling towers: None
- Cooling source: Sea water

Power generation
- Units operational: 4 × 83 MW
- Nameplate capacity: 276 MW
- Annual net output: 1,003.923 GWh (in 1980/1)

External links
- Website: www.gov.uk/government/collections/our-sites
- Commons: Related media on Commons

Berkeley nuclear power station is a former Magnox nuclear power station situated on the bank of the River Severn in Gloucestershire, England. The ongoing decommissioning process is being managed by Nuclear Decommissioning Authority subsidiary Nuclear Restoration Services.

== History ==
The construction of the power station, which was undertaken by a consortium of AEI and John Thompson, began in 1956. It had two Magnox reactors producing 276 megawatts (MW) in total – enough electricity on a typical day to serve an urban area the size of Bristol. The reactors were supplied by the Nuclear Power Group (NPG) and the turbines by AEI. Electricity generation started in 1962 and ran for 27 years to 1989.

Nuclear fuel for Berkeley power station was delivered and removed via the nearest railhead, a loading facility on the Sharpness single railway line. This included a dedicated siding and a gantry crane.

=== Specification ===
Berkeley had four 83 MW turbo-alternator generators, giving a gross capability of 334.4 MW and a net capability of 276 MW. The steam conditions at the turbine stop valve were 20.3 / 3.9 bars (2,030 / 390 kPa) and 319 / 316 °C (606 / 601 °F). In the year 1978/9 the station generated 1,392.63 GWh, and in 1980/1 the station generated 1,003.923 GWh, The overall thermal efficiency of the station in 1981 was 21.12 per cent.

=== Closure ===
Reactor 2 was shut down in October 1988, followed by Reactor 1 in March 1989. Berkeley was the first commercial nuclear power station in the United Kingdom to be decommissioned. So far the nuclear decommissioning process, which is being managed by Nuclear Restoration Services, formerly Magnox Ltd, has involved the removal of all fuel from the site in 1992, and the demolition of structures such as the turbine hall in 1995 and cooling ponds in 2001. The next step of decommissioning will be the care and maintenance stage of the nuclear reactor structures, scheduled to commence in 2026, until radioactive decay means that they can be demolished and the site completely cleared between 2070 and 2080.

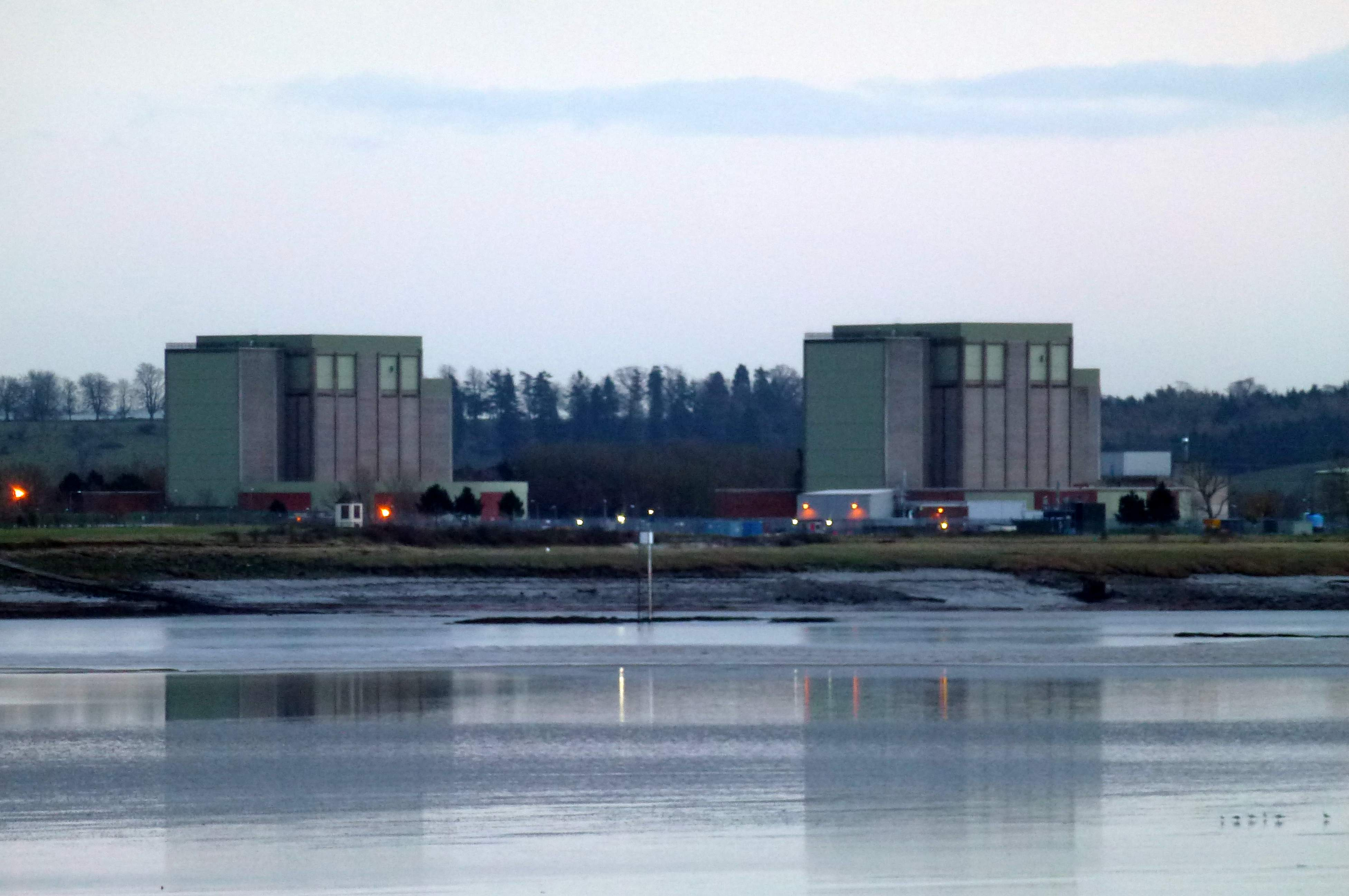
The site in 2014

In March 2012, five of the 310 long tons (310 t) boilers were moved from the station to Sweden for decontamination and recycling.

In December 2013, the Nuclear Decommissioning Authority selected Berkeley as the preferred interim store for intermediate-level waste from the decommissioned Oldbury nuclear power station. This became operational in 2014.

Berkeley is one of four nuclear power stations located close to the mouth of the River Severn and the Bristol Channel, the others being Oldbury, Hinkley Point A and Hinkley Point B. As of 2021, a fifth, Hinkley Point C, is under construction. The surrounding area is designated a Site of Special Scientific Interest (SSSI) and Special Protection Area (SPA) and a RAMSAR wetland of international importance.

In May 2023, a £30.8 million (US$38.8 million) contract was awarded to Altrad for the design, asbestos removal, deplant, demolition and construction works which will take place and conclude in the full removal of the four blower houses that surround the reactor buildings. This was previously slated to be completed when the reactor buildings themselves are demolished in the 2070s.

== Berkeley Nuclear Laboratories ==
Just south of the power station were Berkeley Nuclear Laboratories, one of the UK’s three main nuclear power industry research centres. At its peak about 750 staff worked at the labs including 200 scientists and engineers.

By 2023, the site and some surrounding land was converted into a 50-acre (20-hectare) technology park now called Gloucestershire Science & Technology Park, by a subsidiary of South Gloucestershire and Stroud College. At the centre of the site the former engineering rig hall, building D24, the John Huggett Engineering Hall, was converted into a college engineering campus. Alongside which was built a university technical college. The site now accommodates Bloodhound LSR and Gloucestershire Constabulary.

In August 2024, South Gloucestershire and Stroud College sold the site for £6.5 million to the Chiltern Vital Group, who plan to redevelop the site for a nuclear technology and low-carbon energy "super cluster" of businesses.

== See also ==
- Energy policy of the United Kingdom
- Nuclear power in the United Kingdom
- Energy use and conservation in the United Kingdom
