= Hinkley Point A nuclear power station =

Decommissioned nuclear power plant in England

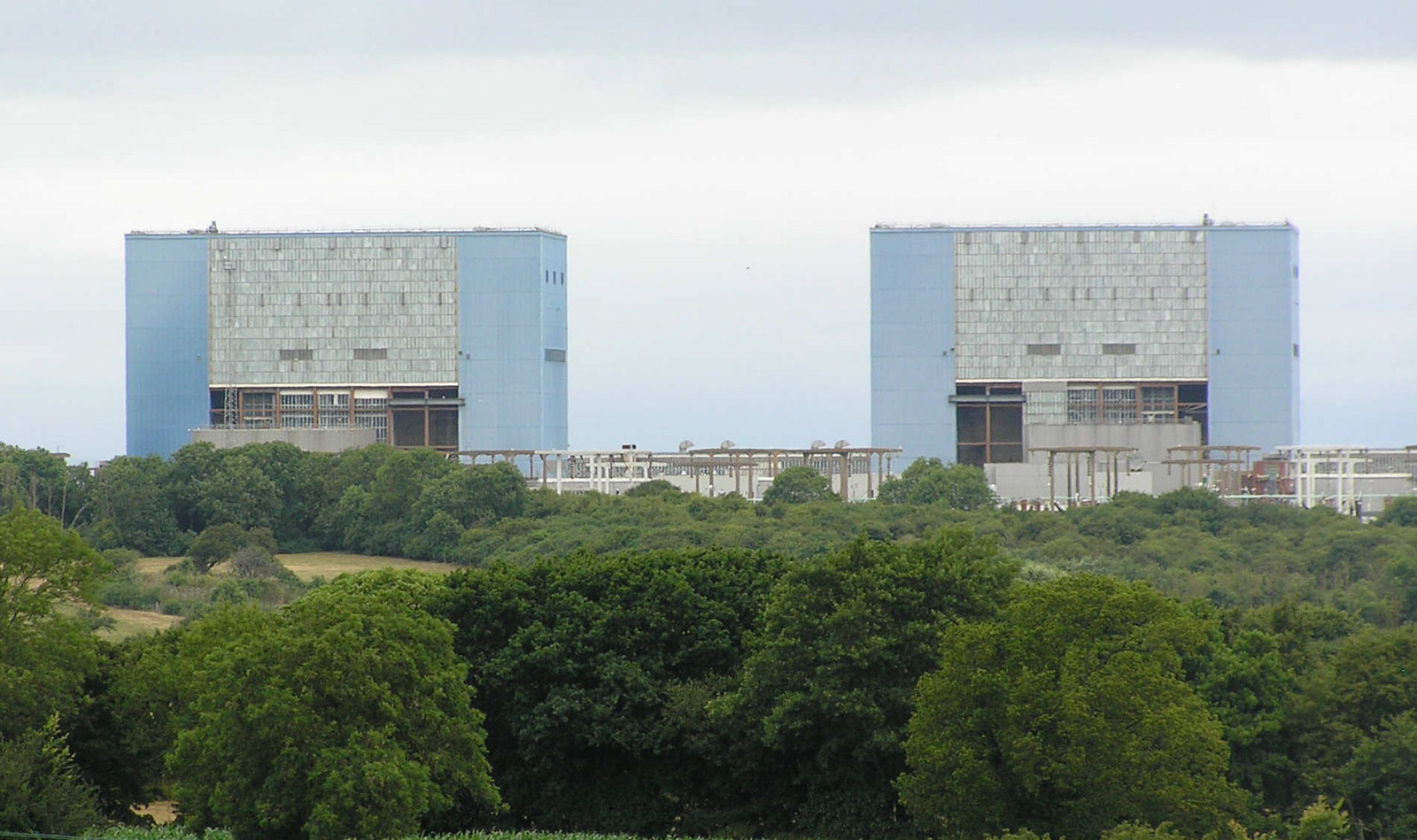
- Hinkley Point A twin buildings housing the Magnox reactors
- Country: England
- Location: Hinkley Point, Somerset, England
- Coordinates: 51.2087°N 3.1337°W
- Status: Decommissioning in progress
- Construction began: 1 November 1957
- Commission date: Unit 1: 16 February 1965; Unit 2: 19 March 1965
- Decommission date: 23 May 2000
- Construction cost: £75 million, (equivalent to £1.27 billion in 2025)
- Owners: Central Electricity Generating Board (1965–1989); Nuclear Electric (1989–1996); Magnox Electric (1996–2005); Nuclear Decommissioning Authority (2005–present)
- Operator: Nuclear Restoration Services

Nuclear power station
- Reactors: 2 (Units A-1 & A-2)
- Reactor type: GCR - Magnox
- Reactor supplier: English Electric & Babcock & Wilcox Ltd
- Cooling source: Sea water (Severn Estuary)
- Thermal capacity: 2 x 900 MW_{t}

Power generation
- Make and model: English Electric
- Units decommissioned: 2 x 235 MW_{e} (net); 2 x 267 MW_{e} (gross)
- Nameplate capacity: 500 MWe
- Capacity factor: 72.4% (lifetime)
- Annual net output: 3,261 GW⋅h (11,740 TJ) (1994)

External links
- Website: www.gov.uk/government/collections/our-sites/
- Commons: Related media on Commons

Hinkley Point A nuclear power station is a former Magnox nuclear power station. It is located on a 19.4-hectare (48-acre) site in Somerset on the Bristol Channel coast, 5 miles (8 km) west of the River Parrett estuary. The ongoing decommissioning process is being managed by Nuclear Decommissioning Authority licensee Nuclear Restoration Services.

== History ==
Hinkley Point A was one of three Magnox power stations located close to the mouth of the River Severn and the Bristol Channel, the others being Oldbury, and Berkeley.

The construction of the power station, which was undertaken by a consortium backed by English Electric, Babcock & Wilcox Ltd and Taylor Woodrow Construction, began in 1957 with a target opening of 1962. The reactors and the turbines were supplied by English Electric.

On 22 April 1966, the Minister of Power Richard Marsh officially opened the new nuclear power plant.

In the late 1970s, two DEC PDP-11/40 mini-computers (One per reactor) were installed for Burst Can Detection and Reactor Temperature Monitoring, replacing the original instrumentation systems. A DEC PDP-11/34 mini-computer was also installed for turbine parameter displays & logging, replacing the original systems.

In 1988, reactor 2 set a world record for the longest continuous period of power generation from a commercial nuclear reactor, of 700 days and 7 hours. Hunterston A Nuclear Power Station held the previous world record of 698 days.

== Design ==
The power station, which is undergoing decommissioning, had two Magnox reactors, each supplying steam to three English Electric 93.5 MWe turbine generator sets which were all together across both reactors designed to produce 500 MWe net but, after de-rating of the reactor power output due to corrosion concerns, both reactors combined produced 470 MWe net.

The design followed the principles established by the Calder Hall nuclear power station, in that it used a reactor core of natural uranium fuel in Magnox alloy cans within a graphite moderator, all contained in a welded steel pressure vessel. The core was cooled by CO_{2} pumped by six nominal 7,000 hp (5.2 MW) gas circulators, which transported the hot gas from the core to the six Steam Raising Units (boilers) via steel ducts. The gas circulators could be driven by induction motors supplied with mains electricity or, when steam was available, from one of the three 33MWe dedicated variable speed turbo alternator sets (One serving each reactor with one spare). The design pressure of the gas circuit was 185 psig, and the temperature of the gas leaving the reactor was 378 °C (712 °F), although this was later reduced when the hot CO_{2} was found to be corroding the mild steel components of the gas circuit more quickly than had been anticipated. Like all Magnox reactors, Hinkley Point A was designed for on-load refuelling so that exhausted fuel elements could be replaced with fresh without shutting down the reactor.

While primarily planned for peaceful electricity generation, Hinkley Point A was modified so that weapons-grade plutonium could be extracted for military purposes should the need arise.

Five 1,050 hp English Electric 8CSV emergency diesel generators were installed at Hinkley Point A, for use in the event of loss of grid supplies.

=== Specification ===
Parameter	
Output of main turbines	6 x 93.5 MW 500 MW
Area of main station	16.2 ha (40 acres)
Fuel per reactor	355 t (349 tons)
Fuel	Natural Uranium
Fuel cans	Magnox
Fuel surface temperature	about 430 °C (806 °F)
CO2 pressure	12.7 bar g (185 lb/in2 g)
CO2 channel outlet temperature	387 °C (729 °F)
Number of channels per reactor	4500
Total weight of graphite per core	1891 t (1861 tons)
Steam conditions turbine stop valve HP	45.5 bar g (660 lb/in2 g) 363 °C (685 °F)
Steam conditions turbine stop valve IP	IP 12.7 bar g (183 lb/in2 g) 354 °C (669 °F)

=== Capacity and output ===
The generating capacity, electricity output, load factor and thermal efficiency was as shown in the table.

Year	Net capability, MW	Electricity supplied, GWh	Load as percent of capability, %	Thermal efficiency, %
1972	663.9	657.122	16.2	22.2
1979	543.9	3,207.368	85.1	24.15
1981	543.9	3,131.881	83.1	24.43
1982	543.9	3,033.583	80.5	24.26
1984	430	3,256.091	86.2	24.27

=== Comparison with Hinkley Point B and C ===
See comparison of Hinkley Point A, B and C

== Gas circulator design problem ==
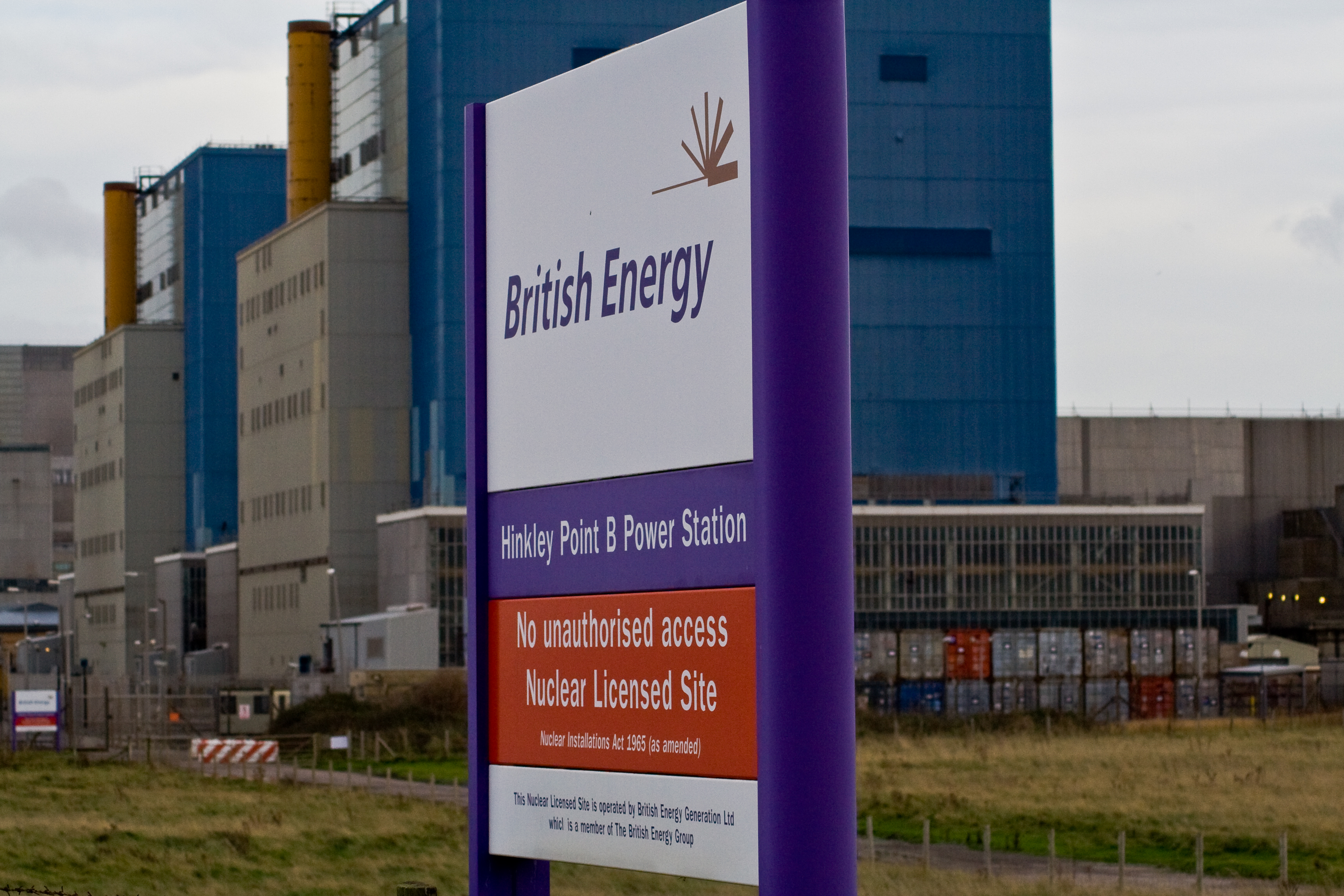
Hinkley Point A reactors seen from the south side of the site

In August 1963, during a hot run test on the first reactor, which had not then been loaded with nuclear fuel, problems were encountered due to noise from the single stage axial flow gas circulators. This could be heard up to 5 miles (8.0 km) away, and personnel working at the station had to wear ear defenders. After unexplained drops in the mass flow rate and motor driving current in number 3 and 5 gas circulators, the hot run tests were stopped and the gas circuit opened up. Severe mechanical damage to the blading and diffuser sections of the number 3 and 5 gas circulators was observed. Large sections of the diffusers had broken away, and extensive fatigue cracking was found in the outer tapering shell and central axial cone. Large pieces of the diffuser casing had entered the gas circulator blades and caused heavy impact damage, and large amounts of debris had been transported down the gas duct. The Inlet Guide Vanes (IGVs), which were provided to enable the performance of individual gas circulators to be "trimmed," were found to be extensively damaged, and the rotor blades and outlet guide vanes also had extensive impact and fatigue damage. Large numbers of the nuts and bolts involved had been shaken loose.

The subsequent investigation determined that the noise was caused by interaction between the IGVs and the rotor blades. The sound pressure levels generated by this noise were high enough to cause rapid fatigue failure in gas circuit components, and major re-design of the gas circulators and associated components was required. The IGVs were scrapped and flow straighteners introduced to smooth the flow of gas into the gas circulator intakes. Much pioneering experimental laboratory work on resonance and sound pressure levels was performed at English Electric's Gas Turbine and Atomic Power Division (APD) facilities at Whetstone, Leicestershire, to support the redesign work, and instrumentation to measure stress and sound pressure levels in the gas circuit during testing was developed. The delay caused severe financial difficulties for the consortium and set the construction schedule back; the station began generating electricity two years late in February 1965.

== Turbine failure ==
The importance of materials design and the understanding of grain boundaries was highlighted during the operation of Hinkley Point. In 1969 there was a catastrophic failure of the Hinkley Point 'A' turbine-generator at near normal speeds (3,200 rev/min). The interaction of fragments of the burst disc and the shaft caused the adjacent disc to burst almost immediately afterwards, and in the general disruption that followed another disc disintegrated completely and the entire unit was irreparably damaged. This is thought to be the first catastrophic failure of a turbine-generator in Britain. The characteristics of the material from which the burst discs were made were a contributory factor in the failure. The 3 Cr-Mo steel made by the a.0.h. process was temper embrittled during slow furnace cooling after heat treatment and therefore had poor fracture toughness, i.e. low tolerance of very sharp crack-like defects in highly stressed regions. Such material can of course be used quite safely in highly stressed regions in the absence of cracks. A material of higher fracture toughness would have tolerated larger cracks without succumbing to their unstable propagation, and the failure would have been postponed if not avoided. At the time of the manufacture of these discs, it was not possible to quantify the effect of embrittlement on the material's ability to tolerate small cracks in the most highly stressed regions. The reason for the failure was down to transport of phosphor towards the grain boundaries which embrittled the chromium steel causing it to fail.

== Closure and decommissioning ==
Both reactors were shut down in April 1999 to carry out reinforcement work following a Nuclear Installations Inspectorate Periodic Safety Review. Reactor 2 was returned to service in September 1999, but shut down on 3 December 1999 because of newly identified uncertainties in the reactor pressure vessel material properties. Examinations at a sister site identified irregularities in weld materials on various reactor penetrations. To access and test these materials at Hinkley Point would require bespoke remote access (robotics possibly) and a timescale exceeding a year. Also at this time an expensive project was underway to thermally lag the exterior of the steel pressure vessel to improve thermal efficiency. The cost of this impending project required a guaranteed operating extension for an acceptable ROI. Because of the cost of remedying these problems, and with no guarantees of a timely solution, Magnox announced on 23 May 2000 that Hinkley Point A would be shut down.

Hinkley Point A was one of 11 Magnox nuclear power stations commissioned in the United Kingdom between 1956 and 1971. During its 35 years of operation, Hinkley Point A generated more than 103 TWh of electricity, giving a lifetime load factor against design of 34%.

The ongoing decommissioning process and site works are being managed by Nuclear Decommissioning Authority subsidiary Nuclear Restoration Services.

Defuelling and removal of most buildings is expected to take until 2031, followed by a care and maintenance phase from 2031 to 2085. Demolition of reactor buildings and final site clearance is planned for 2081 to 2091.

== Site future ==
The Hinkley Point Site was organised as two nuclear power stations: next to Hinkley Point A with its two Magnox reactor buildings there is Hinkley Point B, operated by EDF Energy, with two advanced gas-cooled reactors (AGCR) in one building.

In October 2013, the UK government announced that it had approved the construction of Hinkley Point C. This new plant, consisting of two EPR units; Unit 1 was originally scheduled to be completed in 2025 and Unit 2 in 2026 and both would remain operational for around 60 years.

== See also ==
- Energy policy of the United Kingdom
- Energy use and conservation in the United Kingdom
- Hinkley Point B nuclear power station
- Hinkley Point C nuclear power station
- Magnox
- Magnox Reprocessing Plant
