= Oldbury nuclear power station =

Decommissioned nuclear power plant in England

Oldbury Nuclear Power Station
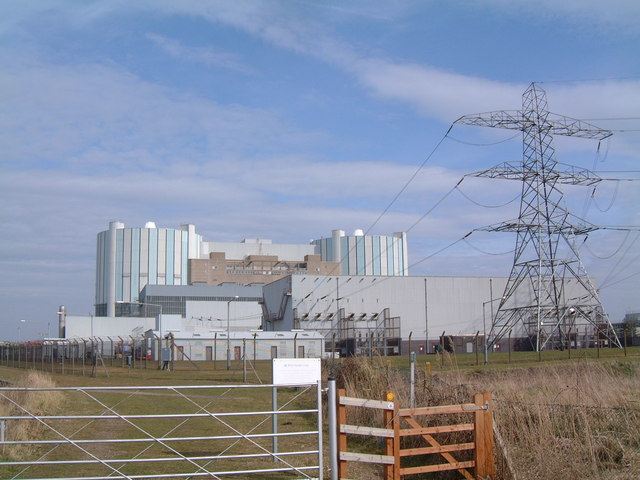
- Country: England, United Kingdom
- Location: South Gloucestershire
- Coordinates: 51.6489°N 2.5708°W
- Status: Decommissioning in progress
- Commission date: 1967
- Decommission date: 2012
- Construction cost: £69 million, (equivalent to £1 billion in 2025)
- Owners: CEGB (1967–1990); Nuclear Decommissioning Authority
- Operators: CEGB (1967–1990); Nuclear Restoration Services

Nuclear power station
- Reactors: 2
- Reactor type: Magnox
- Reactor supplier: The Nuclear Power Group
- Cooling towers: None
- Cooling source: Sea water

Power generation
- Units operational: 4 × 216 MW
- Make and model: Associated Electrical Industries; C. A. Parsons and Company
- Units decommissioned: 2 X 217 MW
- Nameplate capacity: 434 MW; 626 MW (planned)
- Annual net output: 3,288.453 GWh (1980/81)

External links
- Commons: Related media on Commons

Oldbury nuclear power station is a Magnox nuclear power station undergoing decommissioning. It is located on the south bank of the River Severn close to the village of Oldbury-on-Severn in South Gloucestershire, England. The ongoing decommissioning process is managed by Nuclear Restoration Services, a subsidiary of the Nuclear Decommissioning Authority (NDA).

Oldbury is one of four former nuclear power stations located close to the mouth of the River Severn and the Bristol Channel, the others being Berkeley, Hinkley Point A, and Hinkley Point B.

== History ==
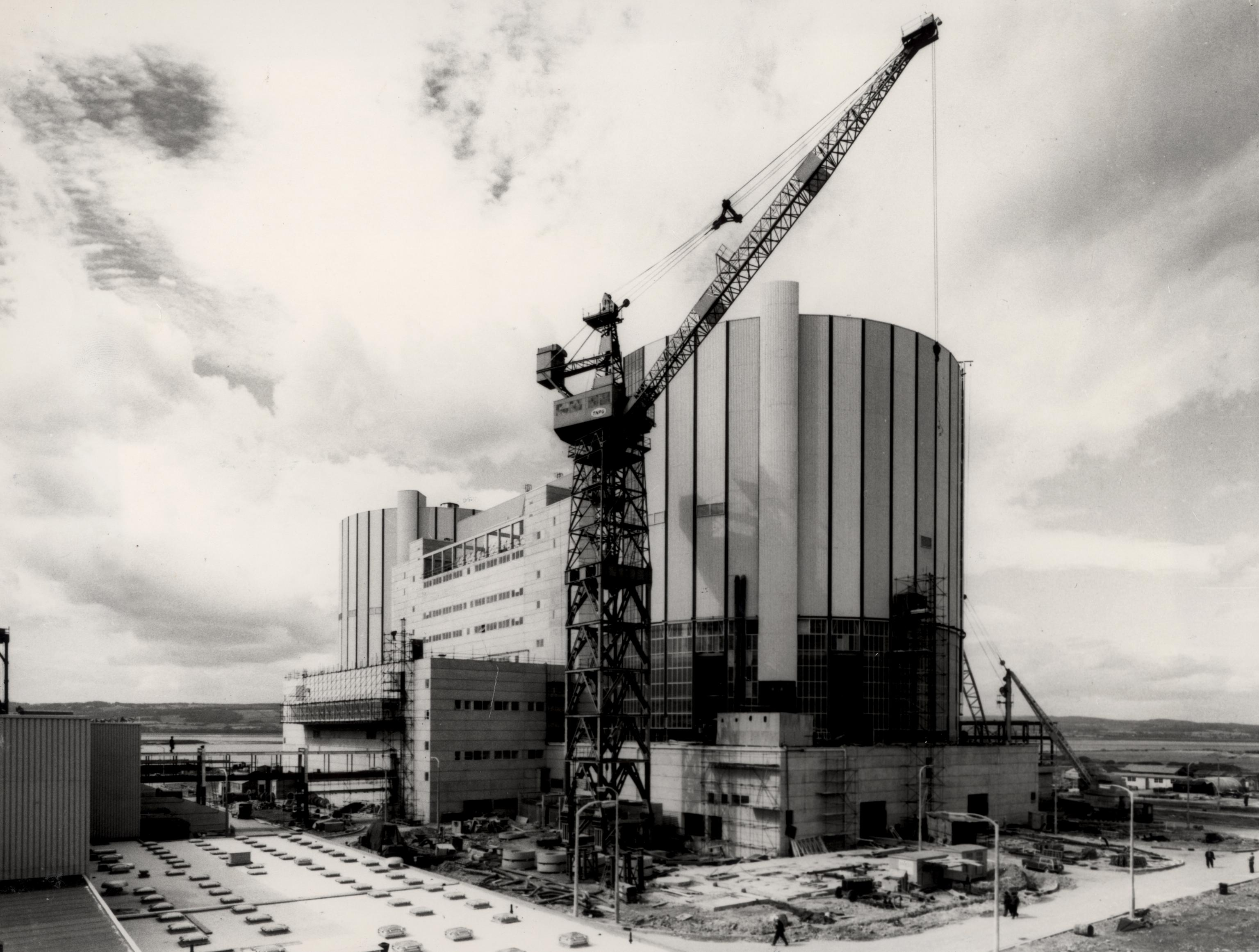
Oldbury in 1967

Opened in 1967, it had two Magnox reactors producing 424 megawatts (MWe) in total – enough electricity on a typical day to serve an urban area twice the size of Bristol. Reactor 1 went critical on 18 September 1967 and first generated electricity on 9 November 1967. Reactor 2 started generating electricity in April 1968.

The construction was undertaken by a consortium known as The Nuclear Power Group ('TNPG'). The reactors were supplied by TNPG and the turbines by AEI and C. A. Parsons & Co. The main civil engineering contractor was Sir Robert McAlpine. Construction on the site began in 1961.

It was officially opened by Tony Benn on 10 June 1969, it had cost £69 million, (equivalent to £1 billion in 2025).

Oldbury was the first nuclear power station in the UK to use prestressed concrete pressure vessels, earlier Magnox reactors having used steel pressure vessels more suited to smaller reactors.

The design net power output of the station was 626 MWe, but due to steel corrosion problems from the hot carbon dioxide coolant within the reactor, operating temperature had to be reduced soon after operation started causing a large drop in power output. Initially, the power output was set at 424 MWe, dropping to 400 MWe by 1973. Then as remedial measures were adopted, power was progressively increased to 434 MWe by 1983 with a gas outlet temperature of 365 °C (689 °F), compared to the 412 °C (774 °F) design temperature, which was maintained as the normal operational output.

The station had two 216 MW turbo-alternator generators giving a gross electrical capability of 439.5 MW and a net capability of 416 MW. The steam conditions at the turbine stop valves was 43.0 bar at 389 °C (732 °F).

The generating capacity, electricity output, load factor and thermal efficiency were as shown in the table.

Year	Net capability, MW	Electricity supplied, GWh	Load as percent of capability, %	Thermal efficiency, %
1972	633.5	3,069.722	87.4	28.3
1979	439.4	3,044.545	83.5	27.98
1981	439.5	3,288.453	90.2	26.8
1982	439.5	3,339.707	91.6	27.09
1984	434	2,945.387	77.3	27.61

In 1976/77, Oldbury was presented with the Hinton Cup, the CEGB's "good house keeping trophy". The award was commissioned by Sir Christopher Hinton, the first chairman of the CEGB.

In 1992, Reactor one set a world record for the longest continuous period of power generation from a commercial nuclear reactor, of 713 days 21 hours and 32 minutes. Hinkley Point A Nuclear Power Station held the previous world record of 700 days and 7 hours, set in 1988.

From 2005 until 2012, the power station was protected by armed officers from the Civil Nuclear Constabulary.

== Closure and decommissioning ==
The station was originally to cease generating at the end of 2008, however continued use was licensed in various stages; an additional 2.5 years in the case of reactor 2, and four years for reactor 1.

Reactor 2 ceased operating permanently on 30 June 2011, followed by Reactor 1 on 29 February 2012.

Defuelling and removal of most buildings is being carried out by Nuclear Restoration Services, formerly Magnox Ltd, and is expected to take until 2027, followed by a care and maintenance phase from 2027 to 2095. Demolition of reactor buildings and final site clearance is planned for 2096 to 2101.

== Incidents ==
On 30 May 2007, only a few days after reopening after safety checks, the power station was shut down as part of standard emergency procedure when a fire broke out on one of the generator transformer HV bushings. No-one was injured in the fire and no radiation was released. Information suggests an insulator overheated, causing it to fail. Minor damage ensued resulting in a standard shutdown. All emergency procedures were commenced, and by 11:30 am the situation was stabilised. The power station resumed production for a few days in June then shut down again. Production eventually resumed on 24 August 2007, at which point it had only produced electricity for eight days since August 2006.

On 17 March 2011 at 10:40 am, Reactor 2 was automatically shut down after an electrical problem. Magnox stated that workers had been carrying out routine maintenance when a small relay overheated (this failure caused the turbine to shut down). Their spokesman went on to say, "Because the turbine tripped the steam produced in the boilers couldn't be sent to the turbine as it would normally and so was released through relief valves on top of the building." and "To reduce the amount of steam being produced, and in accordance with expectations, the reactor automatically tripped and was safely shut down."

On 14 July 2011, Reactor 1 was automatically shut down after 'problems with the refuelling machinery.' Again steam was released to remove the decay heat.

== Silt lagoons ==
The silt lagoons at Oldbury power station are used as a high tide roosting site by birds which feed on the Severn Estuary. Between 1979 and 2005, 199 bird species were recorded at the site. This included a number of vagrants: a green-winged teal in January 2001, a ring-necked duck in April and May 2000, a black-winged stilt in May 1997, a Kentish plover in August 1993, a semipalmated sandpiper in August 1990, a Temminck's stint in April 1984, a pectoral sandpiper in September 1989, a broad-billed sandpiper in August 1983, a ring-billed gull in October 1994, and a Richard's pipit in October 1996.

== Oldbury B ==
Horizon Nuclear Power, an E.ON and RWE joint venture, announced in 2009 intentions to install up to 3,300 MWe of new nuclear plant at Oldbury. Horizon were considering building up to either two 1,650 MWe Areva EPR reactors, or three 1,100 MWe Westinghouse AP1000 reactors. As the Severn estuary water supply would be inadequate to cool these larger reactors, cooling towers would be built.

On 18 October 2010, the British government announced that Oldbury was one of the eight sites it considered suitable for future nuclear power stations.

On 29 March 2012, E.ON and RWE npower announced that their plans to build the new power station had been shelved.

In late 2012, it was announced that Hitachi had bought the UK Nuclear project from E.ON & RWE. It planned to build ABWR (Advanced Boiling Water Reactors) at this site along with Wylfa Newydd, the lead site. Construction would not have started until Wylfa Newydd was operational, in order to learn from experience and correct problematic aspects that arose during construction. However, Hitachi suspended work on Wylfa and Oldbury in January 2019.

In September 2020, Hitachi announced its withdrawal from the Oldbury and Wylfa projects. It will close down its development activities, but will work with the UK government and other stakeholders to facilitate future options for the two sites.

In April 2022, it was announced that Oldbury and Wylfa sites are candidates for two sets of EPR reactors to be constructed as the UK plans to construct up to eight new reactors this decade. These sites would be part of the next set of plants with the first being Hinkley Point C and Sizewell C.

On 6 March 2024, the UK Government announced it was buying both the Wylfa and Oldbury sites from Hitachi for £160 million.

== In popular culture ==
On one occasion, rock band Slade recorded a performance for Top of the Pops inside one of the reactor buildings.

The power station also appeared in several episodes of the BBC Science fiction series Blake's 7.

== See also ==
- Nuclear power in the United Kingdom
- Energy policy of the United Kingdom
- Energy use and conservation in the United Kingdom
- Proposed nuclear power stations in the United Kingdom
