= Hinkley Point C nuclear power station =

Nuclear power station under construction in England

Hinkley Point C nuclear power station (HPC)
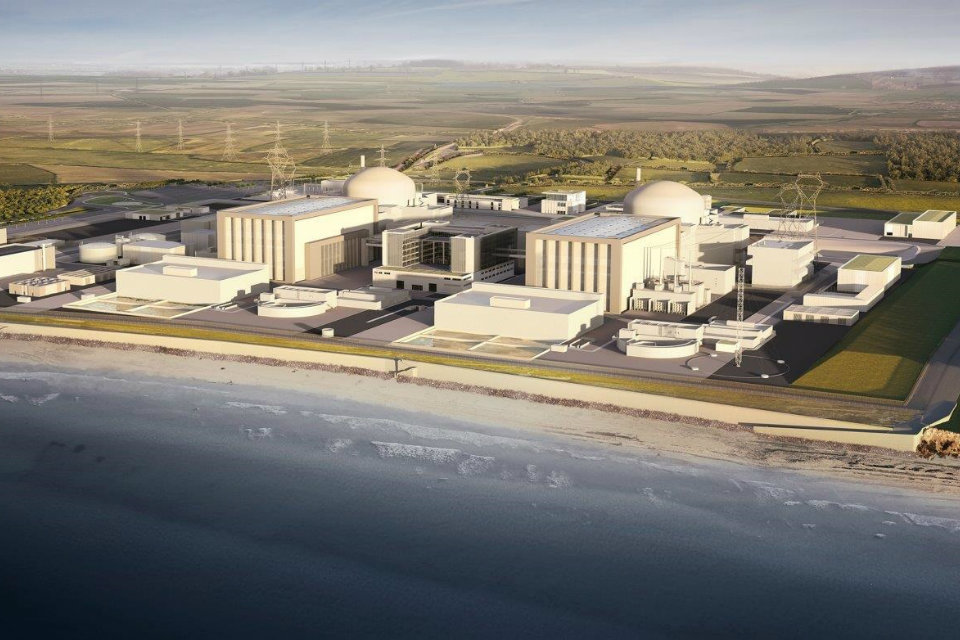
- A 3D model of the Hinkley Point C nuclear power station
- Country: England, United Kingdom
- Location: Hinkley Point, Somerset, South West England
- Coordinates: 51.2059°N 3.1429°W
- Status: Under construction
- Construction began: March 2017
- Commission date: 2030
- Construction cost: £35 billion in 2015 prices (c. £48 billion in 2026 prices)
- Owners: EDF Energy (76.69%); China General Nuclear Power Group (23.31%)
- Operator: NNB Generation Company
- Employees: 6,300 on-site construction workers

Nuclear power station
- Reactor type: PWR - EPR
- Reactor supplier: Framatome
- Cooling source: Sea water from Severn Estuary
- Thermal capacity: 2 × 4,524 MW_{t} (planned)

Power generation
- Make and model: EPR-1750
- Units planned: 2 × 1,630 MW_{e}
- Nameplate capacity: 3,260 MW_{e} (planned)

External links
- Website: https://www.edfenergy.com/energy/nuclear-new-build-projects/hinkley-point-c
- Commons: Related media on Commons

Hinkley Point C (HPC) is a nuclear power station under construction in Somerset, England that will have two pressurized water reactors of the EPR design scheduled to produce a total of 3,200 MWe.

Hinkley was one of eight possible sites announced by the British government in 2010, and in November 2012 a nuclear site licence was granted.

In July 2016, the EDF board approved the project, and in September 2016 the UK government approved the project with some safeguards for the investment. The project is financed by EDF Energy and China General Nuclear Power Group (CGN). The final cost was to be £18 billion in 2015 prices.

When construction began in March 2017 completion was expected in 2025. Since then the project has been subject to several delays, including some caused by the COVID-19 pandemic, and Brexit, and this has resulted in significant budget overruns. As of 2026, Unit 1 of the station is projected to come online in 2030, while the overall project cost is estimated at £35 billion in 2015 prices (c. £48 billion in 2026 prices), almost double the estimated cost when the project was approved.

== History ==
=== 1980s and 1990s ===
In 1981, the UK government announced plans to expand its nuclear power stations and the group Alliance against Hinkley C was founded to oppose construction of another plant at Hinkley Point. The following August it was confirmed that the intent was to build Hinkley C. The Alliance against Hinkley C began publishing a newsletter pressing for the government to focus instead on the development of renewable energy systems and alerting the public to the harm to the environment.

In 1986, the Alliance against Hinkley C was renamed to the Stop Hinkley Expansion Campaign (SHE). The organisation was funded by Greenpeace, and headed by activist Danielle Grünberg and journalist Crispin Aubrey. SHE as one of the major opponents, spent over £50,000 on their campaign to halt construction of Hinkley C. Members participated in the 14-month long public inquiry, which ran from the end of 1988 through December 1989, and heard from over 600 witnesses. 22,000 people lodged opposition to the construction of Hinkley C.

Despite the public outcry, Queen's Counsel Michael Barnes, who conducted the hearings, recommended building the plant in 1990, but said any construction would be delayed until the review of Britain's Nuclear Policy in 1994. SHE continued to oppose the project and advocated for resources to be spent instead on wind and wave power systems. In 1995, plans were abandoned to construct Hinkley C or any other new nuclear power plants in Britain.

=== 2000s ===
In January 2008 a UK government white paper announced support for a new generation of nuclear power stations to be built. Hinkley Point C, in conjunction with Sizewell C, was supposed to contribute 13% of UK electricity by the early 2020s. Areva estimated that their European Pressurised Reactor (EPR) reactor design could produce electricity at the competitive price of £24 per MWh.

EDF, which at the time was 85% owned by the French state, purchased British Energy for £12.4 billion in a deal that was finalised in February 2009, with the nuclear generation business becoming part of EDF Energy. This deal was part of a joint venture with UK utility Centrica, who acquired a 20% stake in EDF Energy Nuclear Generation Ltd as well as the option to participate in EDF Energy's UK new nuclear build programme.

In September 2008, EDF, the new owners of Hinkley Point B, announced plans to build a third, twin-unit EPR power station at Hinkley Point, to join Hinkley Point A (Magnox), which is now closed and being decommissioned, and the Hinkley Point B (AGR), which has a closure date for accounting purposes of 2023.

=== 2010s ===
On 18 October 2010, the British government announced that Hinkley Point – already the site of the disused Hinkley Point A and the then still operational Hinkley Point B power stations – was one of the eight sites it considered suitable for future nuclear power stations. NNB Generation Company, a subsidiary of EDF, submitted an application for a Development Consent Order to the Infrastructure Planning Commission on 31 October 2011.

In February 2013, Centrica withdrew from the new nuclear construction programme, citing building costs that were higher than it had anticipated and a longer construction timescale caused by modifications added after the Fukushima disaster.

The Development Consent Order was published in March 2013. That same month, a group of MPs and academics, concerned that the 'talks lack the necessary democratic accountability, fiscal and regulatory checks and balances', called for the National Audit Office to conduct a detailed review of the negotiations between the Department of Energy and Climate Change and EDF.

In October 2013, the government announced that it had agreed a contract for difference for the electricity production of Hinkley Point C with a strike price of £89.50 per MWh, with the plant expected to be completed in 2023 and remain operational for 60 years.

In December 2013, the European Commission opened an investigation to assess whether the project complies with state aid rules with reports suggesting the UK government's plan may well constitute illegal state aid. Joaquín Almunia, the EU Competition Commissioner, referred to the plans as "a complex measure of an unprecedented nature and scale" and said that the European Commission is "not under any legal time pressure to complete the investigation". In January 2014, an initial critical decision was published, indicating that the UK government's plan may well constitute illegal state aid, requiring a formal state aid investigation examining the subsidies. David Howarth, a former Liberal Democrat MP, doubted "whether this is a valid contract at all" under EU and English law. Franz Leidenmühler (University of Linz, a specialist in EU state aid cases and European competition law), wrote that "a rejection is nearly unavoidable. The Statement of the Commission in its first findings of 18 December 2013, is too clear. I do not think that some conditions could change that clear result." Though given that, ten months later the European Commission approved the financing.

In March 2014, the Court of Appeal allowed An Taisce, the National Trust for Ireland, to challenge the legality of the decision by the Secretary of State for Energy and Climate Change to grant development consent. An Taisce lawyers say there was a failure to undertake "transboundary consultation" as required by the European Commission's Environmental Impact Assessment Directive. Lord Justice Sullivan said that though "he did not venture that it had a real prospect of success, it was desirable that the court should give a definitive view as to whether there should be a reference to the Court of Justice of the European Union and, if not, on the meaning of the Directive". In July 2014, the Court of Appeal rejected An Taisce's application on the basis 'that severe nuclear accidents were very unlikely... no matter how low the threshold for a "likely" significant effect on the environment... the likelihood of a nuclear accident was so low that it could be ruled out even applying the stricter Waddenzee approach'

The UN, under the Convention on Environmental Impact Assessment in a Transboundary Context, ordered the Department for Communities and Local Government to send a delegation to face the committee in December 2014, on the "profound suspicion" that the UK failed to properly consult neighbouring countries.

In September 2014, news leaked that "discussions with the UK authorities have led to an agreement. On this basis, vice-president Almunia will propose to the college of commissioners to take a positive decision in this case. In principle a decision should be taken within this mandate" with a final decision expected in October 2014.

In October 2014, the European Commission approved the project, with only four commissioners voting against the decision. The European Commission adjusted the "gain-share mechanism" whereby higher profits are shared with UK taxpayers.

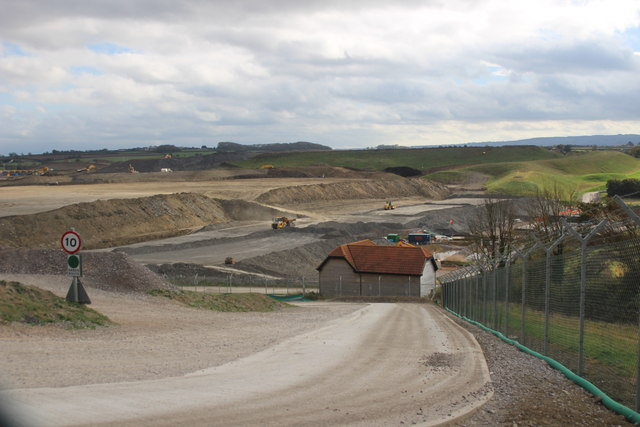
The site in 2017

In June 2015, the Austrian government filed a legal complaint with the European Commission on the subject of the state subsidies. In September 2020, the court confirmed the aid approved by the commission.

In September 2015, EDF admitted that the project would not be completed by 2023, with an announcement on the final investment decision expected in October 2015. Earlier plans to announce Areva and 'other investors' were dropped: "in order to have speed, in the first phase EDF and the Chinese will be the investors". A report by the IEA and NEA suggests privatization as one of the causes for British nuclear power being more expensive than nuclear power in other countries.

In February 2016, EDF again delayed a final investment decision on the project, disclosing that the financial agreement with CGN was yet to be confirmed. EDF, which had recently reported a 68% fall in net profit, was still looking at how it would finance its share of the project. With EDF's share price having halved over the preceding year, the cost of the Hinkley Point C project now exceeded the entire market capitalisation of EDF. EDF stated that "first concrete", the start of actual construction, was not planned to begin until 2019.

In June 2016, EDF executives and managers told MPs that the Hinkley Point C proposal should be postponed until it had "solved a litany of problems", including EDF's "soaring debts". EDF said it would delay a final investment decision until September 2016.

On 28 July 2016, the EDF board approved the project when 10 out of 17 directors voted yes on the final investment decision. Gérard Magnin, a director of EDF who was opposed to the project, resigned before the vote. On the same day, the Secretary of State for Business, Energy and Industrial Strategy Greg Clark announced that the government would delay its decision until the autumn of 2016 to "consider carefully all the component parts of this project", including Britain's national security.

On 8 August 2016, Liu Xiaoming, China's ambassador to Britain, wrote that the UK risked major power shortages by 2025, the Hinkley Point C project is ready to go ahead, the 'UK could not have a better partner than the China General Nuclear Power Corporation', and 'the China-UK relationship is at a crucial historical juncture'.

In August 2016, it was reported that 'civil servants are looking to see if there is any loophole, clause or issue in contracts yet to be signed that allow the Government to pull back without huge loss and while also saving face', that Beijing 'will resist any compromise on the deal', and that one option under consideration is to approve Hinkley Point C but delay a decision on the Bradwell reactor. In September 2016, the UK government announced after its review "significant new safeguards".

In February 2017, the UN, under the Convention on Environmental Impact Assessment in a Transboundary Context, 'said the UK should consider refraining from further works' until it has heard back from other countries on whether it would be helpful for them to be formally notified under a treaty on transboundary environmental impacts.

In July 2017, the estimated construction cost had climbed in two years to £19.6 billion and was revised to £20.3 billion accounting for the fifteen months estimated delay cost, with a start date of between 2025 and 2027.

=== 2020s ===
In January 2021, the estimated construction cost was revised to £22–23 billion (2015 prices), with expected start date of June 2026.

In May 2022, another year of delay and further cost rises were announced, bringing the total to an estimated £25–26 billion (2015 prices), although "the schedule and cost of electromechanical works and of final testing have not been reviewed". In July 2022, EDF warned there was a possibility of further delay to September 2028.

On 13 September 2022, a construction worker was killed on site, in a crush injury traffic accident.

In EDF's 2022 annual results published on 17 February 2023, the cost was £31–32 billion in 2023 prices, Unit 1 had a start date of June 2027 and a risk of 15 months further delay.

In January 2024, EDF presented three scenarios for the works, including when Unit 1 would become operational; with planned installation productivity a 2029 start costing £31 billion (2015 prices, £41.6 billion in 2024 prices), with less favourable installation productivity a 2030 start costing £34 billion (2015 prices, £46.5 billion in 2024 prices) or an unfavourable scenario with 2031 start costing £35 billion (2015 prices, £47.9 billion in 2024 prices).

In February 2026, as part of EDF's 2025 financial statement, the expected first power date for Hinkley Point C was moved to 2030 from the earlier best-case estimate of 2029 due to issues with electromechanical work, while the project's projected cost rose to £35 billion (in 2015 prices).

=== Construction work ===
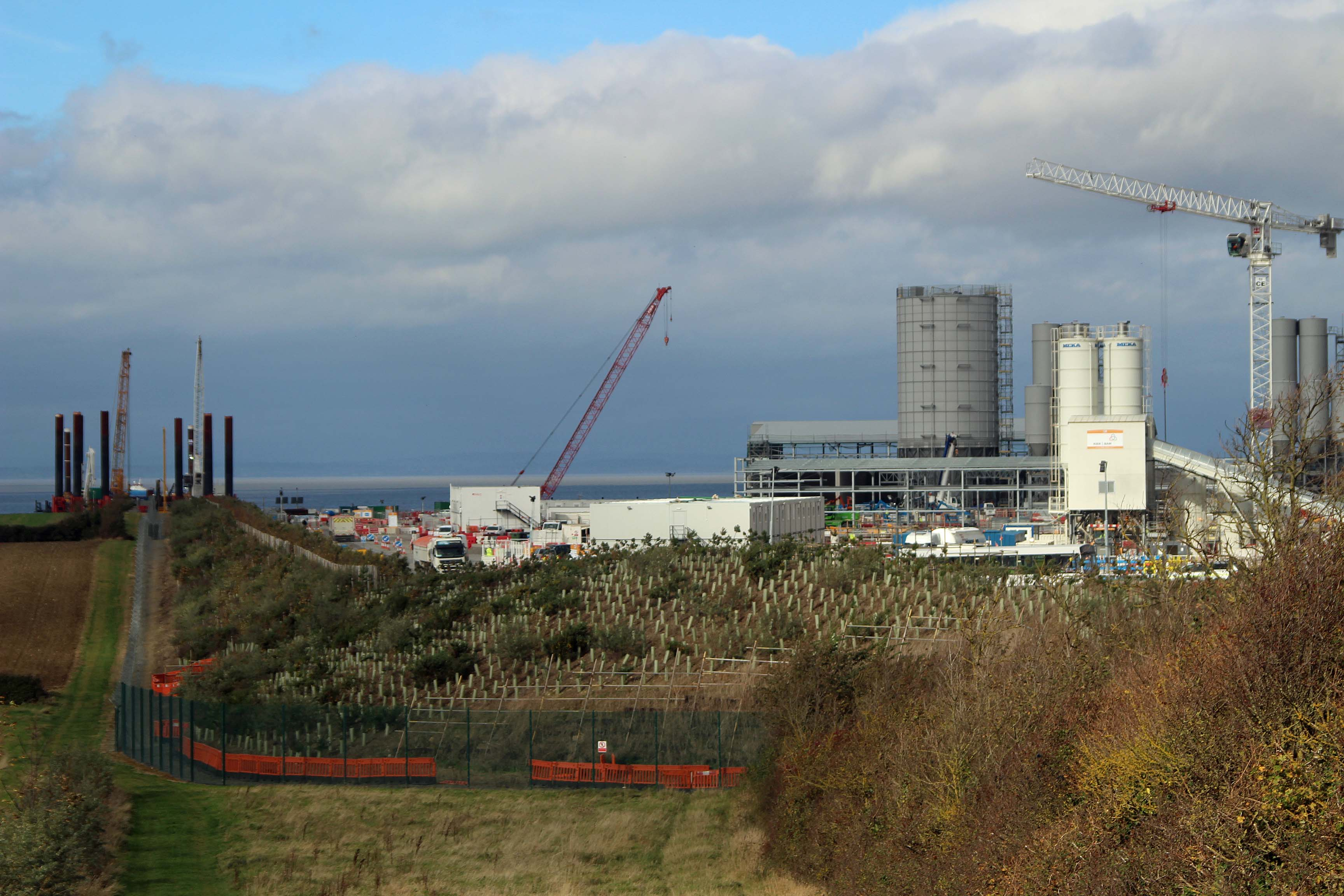
Construction work in 2017

Early enabling works started in July 2008, with the construction of a car park for a ground investigation programme. In 2012, EDF purchased the site of the Manor of Sydenham near Bridgwater which had previously been used as a factory site by British Cellophane, including the Grade II listed 16th-century building.

In 2014, 400 staff undertook initial preparation and construction work. This work included access roads and roundabouts for increased construction traffic, park and ride schemes for the site workers, and a new roundabout for the village of Cannington. Further plans include the construction of a sea wall and a jetty for ships to deliver sand, aggregate and cement for concrete production.

In 2015, the factory site was razed to the ground for construction of temporary accommodation for 1,000 workers.

Since 2016, the construction site for Hinkley Point C has had its own bus company, Somerset Passenger Solutions (SPS), a joint venture between FirstGroup's The Buses of Somerset division and the Southern National bus company. SPS hold a contract to transport construction workers on a number of routes to, from and around the Hinkley Point C site until 2025, using up to 160 buses at the peak of construction. In September 2016, the BBC reported that if construction were to start now, the plant could become operational by 2025.

In March 2017, EDF, after the Office for Nuclear Regulation (ONR) gave approval to start building, the building of the first parts of the plant proper began with a network of tunnels to carry cabling and piping. Work was also under way on a jetty to land building materials, a seawall, and accommodation blocks.

In January 2018, EDF said that they were on track to start generating electricity by 2025 and that they planned to start constructing above-ground structures for the power station by June 2019.

The approximate 2,000 cubic metres (71,000 cu ft) concrete pour for the first reactor started on 11 December 2018. It was completed over a 30-hour period, creating the first part of the unit one 4,500 tonne base, a platform 3.2 metres (10 ft 6 in) thick. The reactor building will be built on the (to be completed) platform. This construction start marks the first new reactor build in the UK after a 30-year break, and the second PWR in the UK, after Sizewell B.

Completion of the base for the first reactor, the final 8,954 cubic metres (316,200 cu ft) of concrete, was achieved in June 2019. Completion of the base for the second reactor, 8,991 cubic metres (317,500 cu ft) of concrete, was achieved in June 2020.

Construction utilises the world's largest crane, the Sarens SGC-250 double ring crane, which is responsible for lifting Hinkley Point C's heaviest components. More than 600 heavy fabrications, including the five major parts of each unit's steel containment liner and dome, are positioned by the SGC-250. The crane, named Big Carl, was delivered in modular form, consisting of over 400 deliveries.

In February 2023, the first nuclear reactor pressure vessel was delivered to site via the Bristol Channel Hinkley-dedicated wharf at Combwich. The pressure vessel was built in France in 2022 by Framatome.

In May 2024, the first of the 520 tonne steam generators was delivered to site in the same manner as the reactor pressure vessel.

Unit 2 is being constructed 20 to 30% faster than unit one thanks to experience and innovation gained from Unit 1.

=== Schedule ===
Key	Completed On Time	Work In Progress	Completed With Delay
Package	Unit 1	Unit 2	Common
Sea Water Cooling Pipes Install (CRF)	Dec 2017		
Sea Wall			March 2018 - December 2018
Nuclear Island Common Raft	June 2019 (J0)	June 2020 (J0)	
Cooling Water Tunnel Boring			Sept 2019
Generation	2029	2030	

=== Permits and licences ===
In November 2012, it was announced that the UK's ONR had awarded a nuclear site licence to NNB Generation Company, a subsidiary created by EDF Energy. This was the first nuclear site licence awarded for a nuclear power station in the UK since 1987, when one was granted for the construction of Sizewell B in Suffolk.

In March 2013, three environmental permits setting levels for emissions from the proposed power station were granted and planning consent was given, but agreement on electricity pricing was still required before building could start.

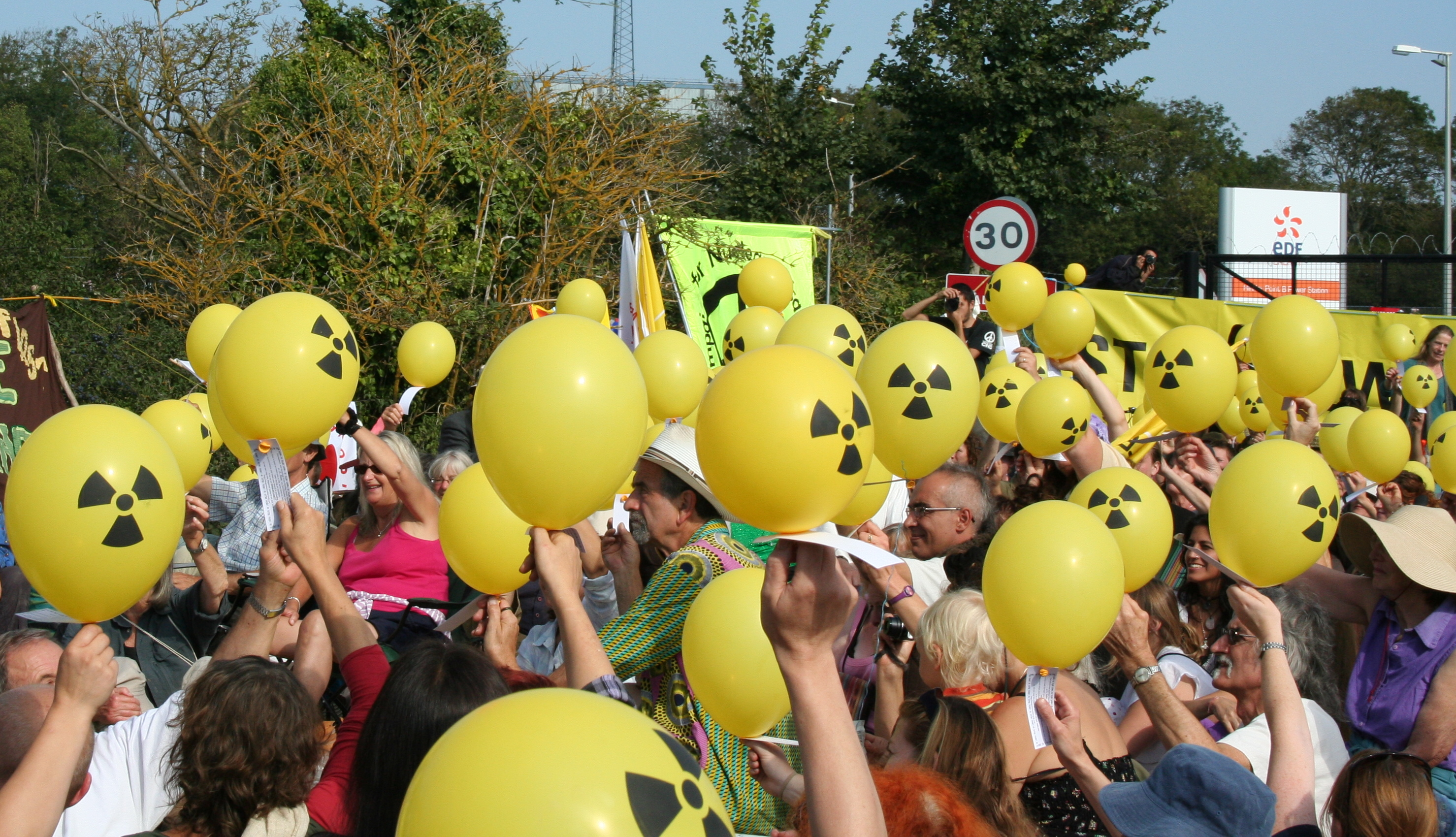
Blockade to protest against nuclear power at Hinkley Point

Through 2013, the operator was in negotiations with the Department of Energy and Climate Change and other government agencies. A major sticking point was a demand by EDF Energy for a guaranteed price for the electricity to be produced, which was about twice the current UK electricity rates. The project is part of the UK's plans to implement a 50% cut in its greenhouse gas emissions by the mid-2020s, which provides for building Hinkley Point C and several other nuclear power plants. By 2013, the operator had invested about £1 billion in site preparation and other start-up costs. If built, the plant will meet about 7% of the UK's electricity needs.

In 2013, Welsh ministers granted permission for EDF to dispose of construction sediment off Cardiff Bay. EDF have said the work 'is not harmful to humans or the environment' but marine pollution expert Tim Deere-Jones claimed the mud 'could expose people to radioactivity'. In 2021, the Welsh Government's expert panel Hinkley Point C Stakeholder Reference Group investigated the doses to the public and workers and concluded that 'the individual and collective doses derived were below the de minimis criteria'.

In October 2013, the government announced that it had approved the agreement of a strike price for the plant's electricity, a major condition for its construction.

In September 2016, the government confirmed it would give EDF a contract for difference for power from the project, imposing significant new safeguards for future foreign investment in critical infrastructure.

On 28 March 2017, the ONR granted its first consent to begin construction of the Hinkley Point C nuclear power plant. The consent covers the placement of the structural concrete for the first nuclear safety-related structure.

On 15 March 2019, the Environment Agency invited comments on an environmental permit application from NNB Generation Company (HPC) Limited for Hinkley Point C Power Station, with a closing date of 26 July 2019.

== Economics ==
=== Cost to consumers ===
EDF's attribution of cost elements in price (2012 prices)
Element	£/MWh	Percent of price
Construction risk premium	35	38%
Other financing costs	26	29%
Operation & maintenance costs	19.5	21%
Capital cost	11	12%
Total electricity price	92.5	

Areva, the EPR's designer, estimated in 2006 that electricity could be produced at a price of £24 per MWh.

EDF has negotiated a guaranteed fixed price – a "strike price" – for electricity from Hinkley Point C under a government sanctioned Contract for difference (CfD). The price is £92.50/MWh (in 2012 prices), which will be adjusted (linked to inflation – £133/MWh in 2025) during the construction period and over the subsequent 35 years tariff period. The base strike price could fall to £89.50/MWh if a new plant at Sizewell is also approved.

In 2022, EDF sought to change the contract to maintain the 35 years tariff period should full operation start after May 2029, which triggers the start of the period regardless of operation status. EDF argued the COVID-19 crisis was a force majeure event, justifying the change.

In July 2016, the National Audit Office estimated that due to falling energy costs, the additional cost to consumers of 'future top-up payments under the proposed CfD for Hinkley Point C had increased from £6.1 billion in October 2013, when the strike price was agreed, to £29.7 billion'. In July 2017, this estimate rose to £50 billion, or 'more than eight times the 2013 estimate'.

==== Criticism ====
Research carried out by Imperial College Business School argues that no new nuclear power plants would be built in the UK without government intervention. Some pro-nuclear groups have also said that the "strike price of Hinkley Point C is too high".

In December 2013, Jim Ratcliffe, the chairman and CEO of Ineos said he had recently agreed to purchase nuclear power in France at £37.94 (€45) per MWh and warned of the Hinkley Point C project: "Forget it. Nobody in manufacturing is going to go near £95 per MWh". Also in December 2013, the chairman of Voimaosakeyhtiö SF described the Hinkley Point C strike price as "very high", saying "subsidies will drive prices up, as everyone will try to get as high a price as possible. Fennovoima (Hanhikivi) will be built without any subsidies, now or ever".

A 2014 Agora Energiewende study claimed that a "reliable power system based on wind, solar and gas backup is 20 percent cheaper than a system of new nuclear power plants combined with gas" based on comparing nuclear and renewable systems where the natural gas energy share remained the same.

In 2016, Third Generation Environmentalism (E3G) proposed five ways that the UK could be powered at lower cost to the consumers than by Hinkley Point C:

- improved energy efficiency could reduce consumption by more than the projected capacity of Hinkley Point C, according to a McKinsey report for the government,
- onshore wind power, which is much cheaper, and offshore wind power, which is also likely to become cheaper than power from Hinkley Point C,
- solar power, which by 2016 has become cheaper than power from Hinkley Point C,
- interconnectors to Norway, Denmark and France, according to a report for NIC and
- savings in electricity due to improved storage and flexibility, according to a NIC report for the government.

In August 2016, CEO Henrik Poulsen of Danish DONG Energy argued that the UK's future energy needs can be covered with accelerated construction of cheaper offshore wind farms instead of Hinkley Point C. Poulsen stated that wind farms could currently undercut Hinkley Point C's strike price with £85/MWh, while others in the industry believe that by the mid-2020s the electricity price from offshore wind farms would reach £80/MWh. On 10 August 2016, Ambrose Evans-Pritchard of The Telegraph wrote that, with growth in energy storage there is little point in construction of baseload power plants such as Hinkley Point C and alleged that "nuclear reactors cannot be switched on and off as need demands" (see also Load following power plant#Nuclear power plants).

On 26 August 2016, the Energy and Climate Intelligence Unit released a report on alternatives to Hinkley Point C. It found that a mixture of established approaches including wind farms, cables connecting the UK grid with other countries and gas-fired power stations, together with measures to manage demand, would save the UK around £1 billion per year while keeping the lights on and meeting climate targets.

On 12 October 2017, The Guardian reported that researchers informed MPs that the UK government was using the expensive Hinkley Point C project to cross-subsidise the UK military's nuclear-related activity by maintaining nuclear skills. The researchers from the University of Sussex Science Policy Research Unit, Prof. Andy Stirling and Dr. Phil Johnstone, stated that without "civil nuclear power ... UK military nuclear infrastructures would be significantly more expensive".

In 2020, EDF announced that the project had resulted in the creation of 10,300 jobs, £1.67 billion spent with companies in the region, and £119 million of community investments. In 2025, the estimated discounted value of future CfD payments was £49.8 billion.

=== Return on equity ===
One analyst at Liberium Capital described the strike price as 'economically insane' in October 2013: "as far as we can see this makes Hinkley Point the most expensive power station in the world... on a leveraged basis we expect EDF to earn a Return on Equity (ROE) well in excess of 20% and possibly as high as 35%". "Having considered the known terms of the deal, we are flabbergasted that the UK Government has committed future generations of consumers to the costs that will flow from this deal".

According to a March 2014 report by Policy Connect, ROE could be between around 19 and 21%, with "broadly two possible reasons...firstly, the risks faced by EDF could genuinely be greater, therefore commanding a higher rate of return. Alternatively, or in addition, the negotiating process may not have been effective in driving down the expected rate of return relative to risk. A lack of competition in the negotiating process could have been influential here. The European Commission has questioned the likelihood of the first of these explanations, in light of what is already known about the allocation of risk".

A European Commission decision on 8 October 2014, adjusted the "gain-share mechanism" whereby higher profits are shared with UK taxpayers. Rather than a 50-50 profit share if the project returned above 15%, the revised "gain share mechanism" will see the UK taxpayer get 60 percent of any profits above a 13.5% return.

According to Dieter Helm, professor of Energy Policy at the University of Oxford, "Hinkley Point C would have been roughly half the cost if the government had been borrowing the money to build it at 2%, rather than EDF's cost of capital, which was 9%."

In July 2017, EDF said that "if the £2.2 billion cost increase came to pass, its rate of return on the project would drop from 9% to 8.2%". In September 2019, The Guardian reported that the additional cost increase in 2019 would bring EDF Energy's internal rate of return "down to between 7.6% and 7.8%".

=== Financing ===
The construction cost was given by EDF as £16 billion in 2012, updated to £18 billion in 2015, and to between £19.6 billion and £20.3 billion in July 2017. The European Commission has previously estimated £24.5 billion, including financing costs during construction. Financing for the project will be provided "by the mainly [French] state-owned EDF [and Chinese] state-owned CGN will pay £6 billion for one third of it". EDF 'might sell another 15% stake in the project'. In September 2015, George Osborne announced a further £2 billion UK government guarantee for financing of the project. In May 2016, a senior official at China National Nuclear Corporation (CNNC) said 'the final proposal is for the Chinese to take a 33.5% stake in the project. But this will be a combination of CGN and CNNC. We haven't yet decided what percentage we are going to invest'.

In February 2016, Jean Bernard Lévy, EDF Chief Executive, confirmed a 68% drop in net profits and cut in dividend, saying that a final investment decision on the project would follow 'when all this is fully organised'. Also in February 2016, another source said 'the question of the funding is far from being resolved, EDF and the French state would need to sell assets under good conditions and in a short period of time, which seems quite complex at the moment considering EDF's share price'. In March 2016, Thomas Piquemal, EDF's Chief Financial Officer resigned after 'saying the company should wait another three years before making the final investment decision on the project' where Jean Bernard Lévy disagreed 'saying he wanted it to happen as early as next month'. In March 2016, Jean Bernard Lévy wrote to EDF staff that he was in talks to 'obtain commitments from the state to help secure our financial position' and would 'not engage in the [Hinkley Point] project before these conditions are met'. In March 2016, Emmanuel Macron, the French Minister of Economy, Industry and Digital Affairs said that a final investment decision would not be made until May 2016. On 25 April 2016, EDF announced plans to sell €4bn of new shares to 'help it finance the building of the Hinkley Point nuclear plant' with the French government subscribing €3bn of these shares 'as well as taking a scrip dividend option for 2016 and 2017'.

In December 2016, The Economist reported that the British loan guarantees require the EPR reactor Flamanville 3 to be operational by 2020, that the regulator will rule on the future of the Flamanville reactor mid-2017 and that one possible outcome of this ruling can delay its opening far beyond 2018, thus jeopardizing the British loan guarantees thereby preventing EDF from building the EPRs at Hinkley Point.

In 2020, the French financial markets authority, Autorité des marchés financiers (AMF), levied a €5 million fine on EDF for misleading investors about the cost of the Hinkley Point C in 2014. EDF had claimed in an October 2014 press release that the UK government agreement was unchanged from 2013, when there had been significant changes to the financing plan, which may have artificially raised EDF's share price. AMF also levied a €50,000 fine on EDF's then CEO.

In December 2023, recently nationalised EDF was confirmed to be the sole private guarantor of the project as it currently stands, with CGN's exposure limited to figures agreed on in 2016. The £18 billion investment estimate underlying that deal has significantly increased since, likely to exceed a £32.7 billion estimate made in 2023 that used 2015 pricing.

In January 2024, EDF announced that it estimated that the final cost would rise to between £31-35 billion in 2015 prices depending on various risk outcomes, or between £41.6–47.9 billion in 2024 prices, and Unit 1 operational between 2029 and 2031. The site managing director said EDF had "found civil construction slower than we hoped and faced inflation, labour and material shortages, on top of Covid and Brexit disruption".

As of February 2025, EDF had not found investors to replace additional investment from CGN, and was meeting the additional costs itself. EDF had written down the project by €12.9 billion in its 2023 accounts, and a further €1.1 billion recently for inflation. In June 2025 US asset management group Apollo contributed £4.5 billion in "an investment-grade debt financing package for the project at an interest rate below 7%". In March EDF's British subsidiary had €6.7 billion of debt.

== Specification ==
=== EPR ===
EDF is building two of Areva's EPR reactors in the UK, with a design net power output each of 1,600 MWe (1,630 MWe gross). Four EPR reactors are currently operating, two at Taishan in China, one at Olkiluoto in Finland, and one at Flamanville in France. The HPC design has significant changes from the previous units, with 20% more equipment than the Taishan design. The safeguards buildings have been redesigned. The HPC technical director stated in 2019 "In effect HPC is a first-of-a-kind plant in a country that has not built a new plant for three decades."

In December 2007, the Union of Concerned Scientists referred to the EPR as the only new reactor design under consideration that "...appears to have the potential to be significantly safer and more secure than today's reactors". "The French and German governments have also required Areva to enable the reactor’s safety systems and spent fuel building to withstand the crash of a military aircraft. And in the event of an accident or sabotage, the EPR’s double-walled containment structure would hold up better than the standard single-walled one."

EDF and Areva have been facing 'lengthy delays and steep cost overruns' on EPR reactors being built at Flamanville Nuclear Power Plant in France and at Olkiluoto Nuclear Power Plant in Finland. In October 2013, George Monbiot, a supporter of nuclear power, said that "the clunky third-generation power station chosen for Hinkley C already looks outdated, beside the promise of integral fast reactors and liquid fluoride thorium reactors. While other power stations are consuming nuclear waste (spent fuel), Hinkley will be producing it." In February 2015, France's energy minister said that 'an overhaul of the country's state-controlled nuclear energy industry was imminent'. On 13 June 2016, the Fédération Nationale des Cadres Supérieurs unveiled a series of problems with the EPR design, including that the French nuclear safety authority (ASN) may not give the green light to the EPR being constructed at Flamanville due to various anomalies, there may be "identical flaws" in the Areva EPR being built at Taishan 1 in China, falsification of parts from Areva's Le Creusot plant that potentially put safety checks at risk, and multibillion-euro litigation between Areva and the Finnish energy group TVO over delays to the EPR scheme at Olkiluoto Nuclear Power Plant remains unsettled.

In 2016, EDF Directors Thomas Piquemal and Gérard Magnin separately resigned over their concerns about the risk of the project. However, Chris Bakken, an EDF Project Manager, has said that EDF has full confidence they 'won't repeat the mistakes of the Finnish and French EPRs'.

=== Comparison with A and B ===
	Hinkley Point C	Hinkley Point B	Hinkley Point A
Date Construction Started	2018	1967	1957
Date of Commercial Operation	Expected in 2031	1976	1964
Cost	£22–£23 billion (2021 GBP) (£27–£28 billion in 2025 GBP)	£140 million estimated (1967 GBP) (£2.23 billion in 2025 GBP)	
Area of Main Station	94 ha (230 acres)	8.1 ha (20 acres)	16.2 ha (40 acres)
Efficiency		41.4%	26%
Reactor
Reactor Type	EPR	AGR	Magnox
World Reactor Number		43	19
Fuel Elements
Fuel	Uranium dioxide slightly enriched	Uranium oxide slightly enriched in ceramic form	Natural Uranium Metal
Enrichment	Up to 5%	2.2–2.7%	None
Number of Fuel Channels	241	308	4,500
Turbine
Output of Main Turbines	2 x 1,600 MW = 3,200 MW	2 x 660 MW = 1,250 MW	6 x 93.5 MW = 500 MW
Turbine Speed	Around 1,500 r.p.m	3,000 r.p.m.	3,000 r.p.m.
Cooling Water
Temperature Rise of Water	Approximately 11 °C (20 °F)	9 °C (16 °F)	

== Criticism and organised opposition ==
A protest group, Stop Hinkley, was formed to campaign for the closure of Hinkley Point B and oppose any expansion at the Hinkley Point site or elsewhere in the Bristol Channel and Severn Estuary. The group is reportedly concerned that the new generation of power stations will store nuclear waste on site until a permanent repository is found, claiming that this is an unknown length of time and could potentially take decades. The group issued a press release opposing any plans for a new power station on 24 September 2008, when it was announced that EDF had offered to acquire British Energy. The group has acknowledged that opposition in the local area is by no means unanimous.

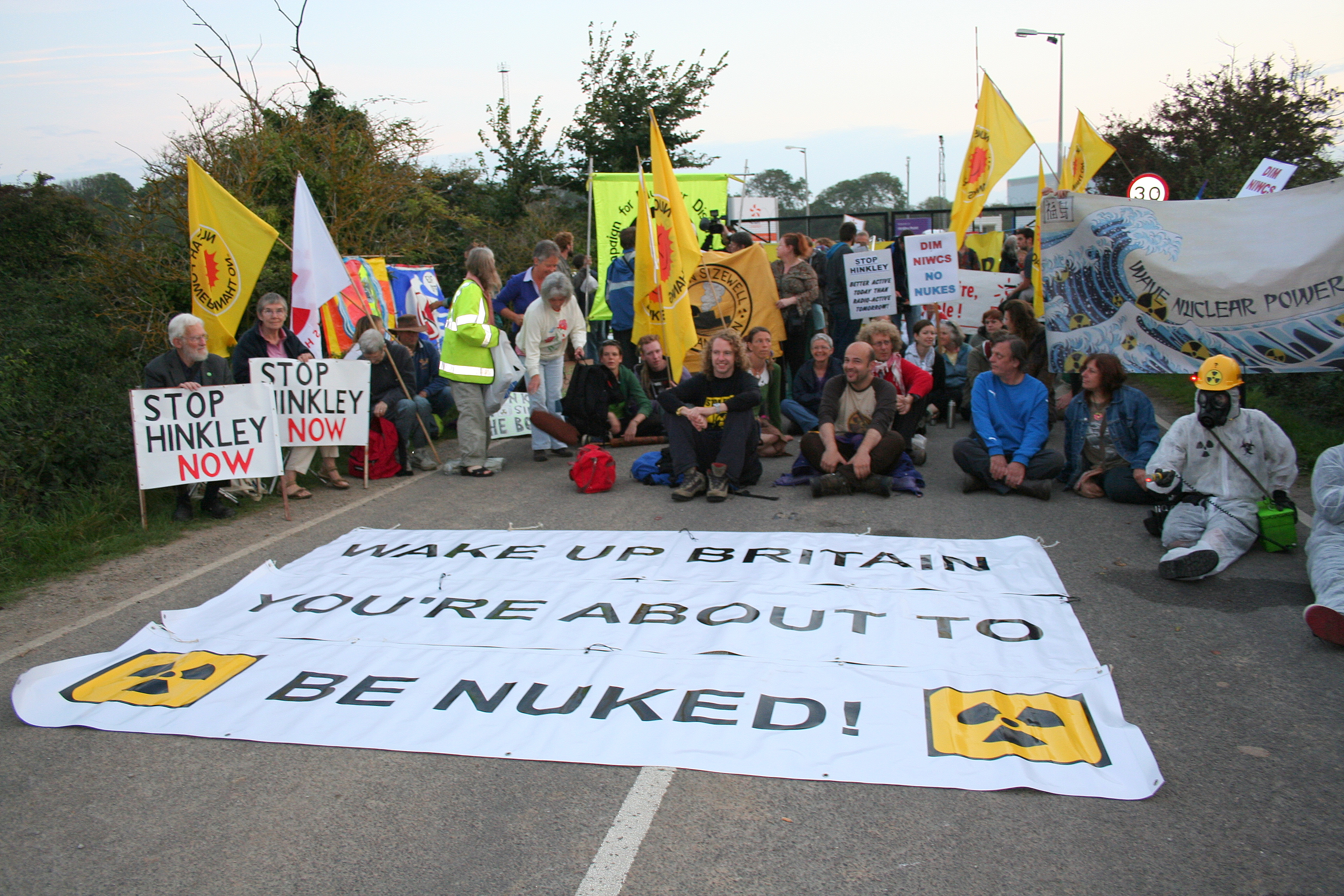
A blockade at Hinkley Point in October 2011

In October 2011, more than 200 protesters blockaded the site. Members of several anti-nuclear groups that are part of the Stop New Nuclear alliance barred access to Hinkley Point power station in protest at EDF Energy's plans to renew the site with two new reactors.

In February 2012, about seven protesters set up camp in an abandoned farmhouse on the site of the proposed Hinkley Point C nuclear power station. They were reportedly angry that "West Somerset Council has given EDF Energy the go-ahead for preparatory work before planning permission has been granted". The group also claimed that a nature reserve is at risk from the proposals.

On 10 March 2012, the first anniversary of the Fukushima nuclear disaster, 200 anti-nuclear campaigners formed a symbolic chain around Hinkley Point to voice their opposition to new nuclear power plants, and to call on the coalition government to hold back on its plan for seven other new nuclear plants across the UK. The human chain was planned to continue for 24 hours, with the activists blocking the main Hinkley Point entrance.

On 8 October 2012, the Stop New Nuclear Alliance organised a mass trespass at the site earmarked for Hinkley C. A total of eight people were arrested, mainly for cutting through the wire of the perimeter fence. A march and rally was held in the nearby town of Bridgwater two days earlier.

In Germany, the renewable energy supplier Elektrizitätswerke Schönau (EWS) lodged a formal complaint on 28 November 2014 (after the October 2014 European Commission approval), on the basis that the project "breaches Article 107 TFEU by approving distortive state aids". EWS also launched an online petition, with about 168,000 supporters by June 2015.

In 2015, Nick Timothy, political adviser to Theresa May, wrote an article to oppose People's Republic of China's involvement in sensitive sectors such as the Hinkley Point C nuclear power project. He criticised David Cameron and George Osborne of "selling our national security to China" without rational concerns and "the Government seems intent on ignoring the evidence and presumably the advice of the security and intelligence agencies." He warned that security experts are worried the Chinese could use their role in the programme (designing and constructing nuclear reactor) to build weaknesses into computer systems which allow them to shut down Britain's energy production at will and "...no amount of trade and investment should justify allowing a hostile state easy access to the country's critical national infrastructure."

On 23 June 2017, the National Audit Office published a report on Hinkley Point C. The conclusions were summarised as follows: "The Department has committed electricity consumers and taxpayers to a high cost and risky deal in a changing energy marketplace. Time will tell whether the deal represents value for money, but we cannot say the Department has maximised the chances that it will be."

On 25 March 2018, The Guardian reported that: "The UK nuclear regulator has raised concerns with EDF Energy over management failings that it warns could affect safety at the Hinkley Point C power station if left unaddressed"; the original ONR report stated "some arrangements are below standard and ONR is seeking improvements against a number of Regulatory Issues that have been raised under Licence Condition 17 (Management Systems)".

Concerns have also been raised about one investor, state-owned China General Nuclear Power Group, which has been blacklisted by the United States Department of Commerce for attempting to acquire advanced US nuclear technology and material for diversion to military use. As of July 2021, over 100 Chinese engineers were working on Hinkley Point C, utilising their experience of building the first two operating EPR reactors, about 50 of whom were working on site.

Hinkley Point C was an issue in campaigning for the 2017 French presidential election, the first round of which was held in April 2017. Marine Le Pen's National Front was "fundamentally against" the project that "would divert resources from state-controlled EDF" while Emmanuel Macron was in support in the belief that it "could reinvigorate the fortunes of EDF".

In 2021 the Welsh Government's expert panel Hinkley Point C Stakeholder Reference Group investigated the potential effect of cooling water pumping on fish populations. The results of the CEFAS study TR456 Ed 2, which stated that their "analyses shows that HPC without an AFD fitted would have no adverse effect on site integrity for any of the designated sites", were contrasted with Dr Peter Henderson's calculation "that the estimated annual capture rate (impingement) of the system will be 182 million fish, and it is likely that many of these will not survive. The AFD (acoustic fish deterrent) commonly known by the name "fish disco" came under further scrutiny in the press. Although making up a fraction of the overall expense associated with measures implemented to protect fish, it was criticised for its excessive costs and contributing to delays in the plant's construction.

== Timeline ==
- March 2008: (Brown ministry) and France (president: Nicolas Sarkozy) announce deal to construct new nuclear power stations, UK
- Early enabling construction work commences
- September 2008: EDF buys British Energy
- May 2009: Centrica announces joint venture with EDF to build new nuclear power stations, UK
- October 2010: Hinkley Point announced as one of the eight candidates by the British government (Cameron–Clegg coalition)
- April 2011: Health and Safety Executive and Environment Agency delay assessment of proposed reactor designs due to Fukushima disaster
- October 2011: Application for development consent by NNB Generation Company was submitted to the Infrastructure Planning Commission
- November 2012: EDF is awarded nuclear site licence
- February 2013: Centrica pulls out of joint venture with EDF
- March 2013: EDF granted development consent order from Department of Energy and Climate Change
- October 2013: Government and EDF agree on "strike price" of Hinkley Point C
- 8 October 2014: European Commission announces that it has approved the Hinkley Point C State aid case.
- September 2015: EDF admits that the project will not complete in 2023, with a further announcement on the final investment decision expected in October 2015
- 21 September 2015: Government announces £2 billion loan guarantee for the project
- 21 October 2015: State-owned China General Nuclear (CGN) agrees in principle to invest £6 billion into the project.
- February 2016: EDF again fails to make a final investment decision on proceeding. Financial agreement with CGN yet to be confirmed, and EDF still looking at how it would finance its share of the project.
- 28 July 2016: EDF makes the final investment decision on building Hinkley Point C. On the same day, Theresa May's government announces that it will review the project and 'make its decision in the early autumn' with government sources interpreting this to mean that the project will be approved at that time.
- 31 August 2016: Five staff representatives on the board of EDF file a legal complaint seeking to reverse EDF's decision to go ahead with the Hinkley Point project.
- 15 September 2016: British government (First May ministry) gives the go-ahead for Hinkley Point C following a new deal with EDF.
- 27 March 2017: ONR grants consent for construction of Hinkley Point C to begin.
- 3 July 2017: EDF announces that the total cost of the power station was likely to rise to between £19.6 billion and £20.3 billion, depending upon the overrun. A government spokeswoman says "the cost of construction, including any overruns, sits with the contractor".
- 25 September 2019: EDF announces that the total cost of the power station was likely to rise by up to £2.9 billion and the total bill could be more than £22 billion
- June 2020: EDF announces that the reactor base for Unit 2 has been completed at a much faster rate than Unit 1. This was down to the base being almost identical to Unit 1. As a result, the steel was installed 45% faster, the liner cup floor was constructed 30% faster and the cooling system components were installed 50% faster.
- 14 September 2020: EDF announces that the lift for the 170-tonne liner cup was completed 30% quicker than the identical part on Unit 1, despite restrictions in place to prevent the spread of COVID-19.
- 15 December 2023: World's largest crane places 47 m-wide (154 ft) dome onto Hinkley Point C's first reactor building
- 8 February 2024: National Grid has performed 4 million man-hours of work upgrading the grid around HPC. A 174-tonne 400 kV supergrid transformer was sent from Rotterdam up the river Parrett to upgrade the Bridgwater substation in Somerset.
- 14 October 2024: last containment vessel liner ring on Unit 2 was lifted into place.
- 3 December 2024: reactor pressure vessel installed in Unit 1.
- 17 July 2025: World's largest crane places 47 m-wide (154 ft) dome onto Hinkley Point C's second reactor building.
- 12 January 2026: reactor pressure vessel delivered to Unit 2.
- 1 June 2026: reactor pressure vessel installed in Unit 2.

== 1980s PWR proposal ==
An earlier proposal for a Hinkley Point C power station was made by the Central Electricity Generating Board (CEGB) in the 1980s for a sister power station to Sizewell B, using the same pressurised water reactor design, at a cost of £1.7 billion. This proposal obtained planning permission in 1990 following a public inquiry, but was dropped as uneconomic in the early 1990s when the electric power industry was privatised and low interest rate government finance was no longer available.

== Gallery ==
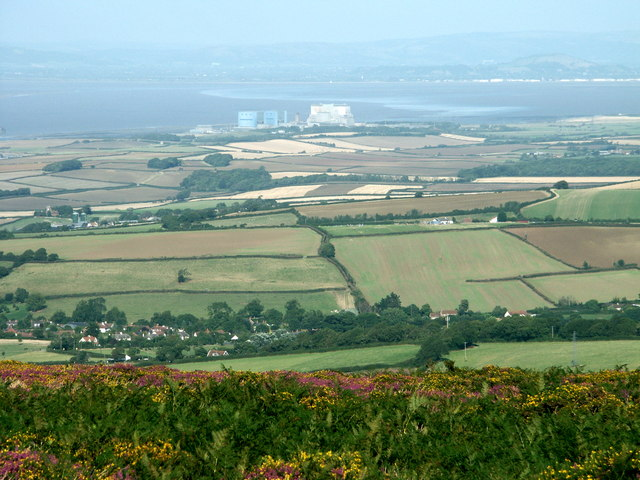
Aerial view of the power plant

Exterior view of the power plant

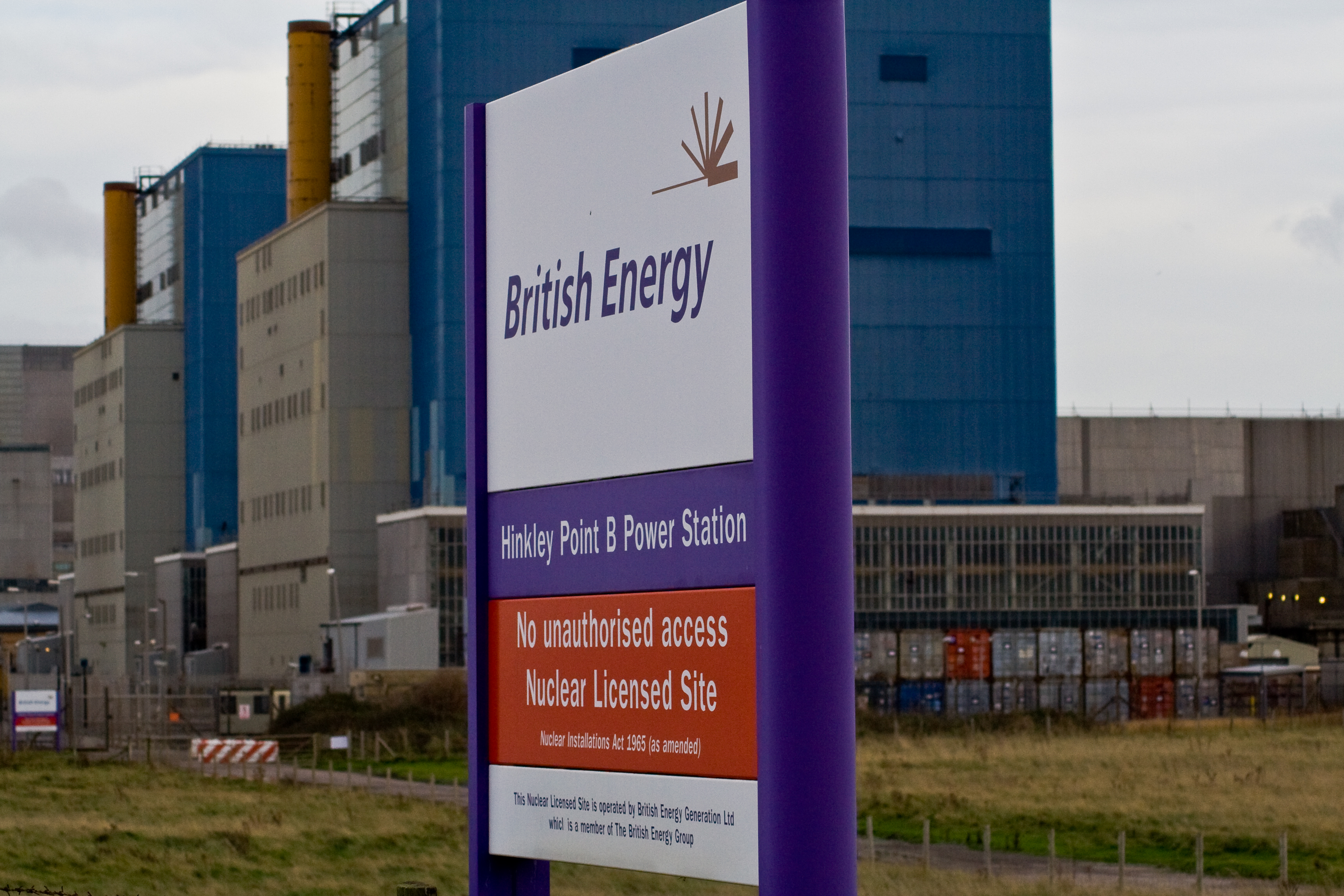
Hinkley Point A, seen from the entrance to Hinkley Point B

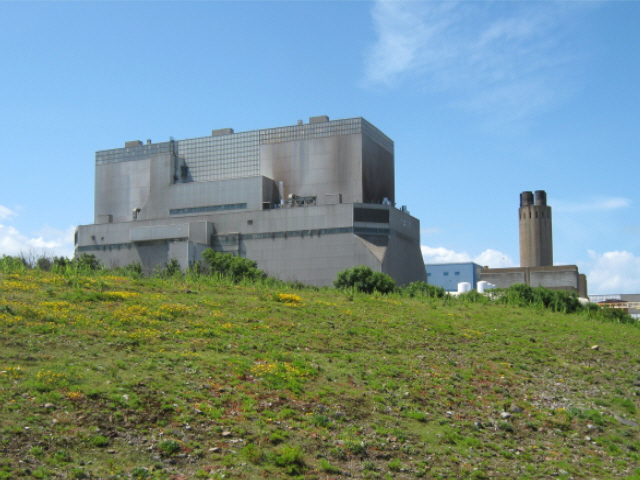
Hinkley Point B

== See also ==
- Moorside clean energy hub – Proposed British energy infrastructure
- Energy policy of the United Kingdom
- Energy use and conservation in the United Kingdom
- Nuclear power in the United Kingdom
- Proposed nuclear power stations in the United Kingdom
- T-pylons – Structure used to support an overhead power line
