= James L. Gray =

British engineer

- Gray in 2002
- Born: James Laird Gray; 1926; Glasgow, Scotland
- Died: 2 August 2010 (aged 83–84); Garelochhead, Argyll and Bute, Scotland
- Education: University of Glasgow (BS)
- Occupation: Engineer
- Spouse: Mary (m. 1954)
- Children: 3

James Laird Gray (1926 – 2 August 2010) was a Scottish engineer who helped develop several power stations in England and Scotland. An important figure in the field of steam turbine technology in the UK, he received the Thomas Hawksley Medal and the James Clayton Award from the Institute of Mechanical Engineers for his work at two nuclear power stations.

== Biography ==
Born in Glasgow in 1926, he was educated in the early years of WWII and qualified for university entrance at the age of 16. Despite qualifying, Gray was too young to be admitted. He then became an apprentice at Yarrow Shipbuilders Ltd in Scotstown. At 17, he entered Glasgow University, and three years later graduated with a Bachelor of Science (First-Class Honors) in mechanical engineering.

He moved to England from Scotland to begin working in steam turbine and power station engineering at English Electric in Rugby. In an article published at his retirement, he gave credit for this direction to the chief engineer of English Electric, who said, "forget naval turbines" and steered him towards power station steam turbines which were "the thing of the future."

He married his wife Mary in 1954 and had three children: Alex (b. 1955), Susan (b. 1956), and John (b. 1964).

After English Electric, Gray joined the British Electricity Authority, later known as the Central Electricity Authority (CEA) and then the Central Electricity Generating Board (CEGB), where he became head of the CEGB's Turbine Generator Design Branch. A move by the CEGB's Generation, Design, and Construction Department to Barnwood required him to relocate to Gloucestershire. A couple of years later, he left to become a Manager of Generation, Design, and Technical Services at the South of Scotland Electricity Board (SSEB) in Glasgow.

Jim's mother (far right), maternal grandparents, aunts & uncles (Dennistoun, Glasgow, late 1890s)

New nuclear power stations were coming into service at this time, providing a large part of Scotland's non-fossil fuel generation capacity. Gray believed advancing modern atomic generation capacity to be essential to supplying power in the future, and he regretted the loss of expertise and manufacturing capacity in the sector since the end of new-build nuclear projects in the UK.

Gray retired in the late 1980s and lived with his wife in Garelochhead, the family home since 1975. He stayed busy even while in retirement; he and his wife were key figures in the renovation and management of Gibson Hall, a community center. He also maintained an active interest in public energy policy, particularly in Scotland. In 2008 he authored the pamphlet Electric Power in the New Scotland, which proposed a renewed commitment to nuclear power generation in Scotland and which formed part of a submission that he made to the Scottish Government Economy, Energy, and Tourism Committee's Inquiry into Scotland's Energy Future.

Later in retirement, he lost sight due to glaucoma and subsequently developed chest complaints. After deteriorating health, he died in the family home on 2 August 2010.

== Awards ==
During his career, Gray received two awards from the Institute of Mechanical Engineers: the Thomas Hawksley Medal for his investigative work into a significant steam turbine failure at Hinkley Point A nuclear power station, and the James Clayton Award for work on the ingress of seawater to a reactor at Hunterston B nuclear power station.

Gray was a Fellow of the Royal Academy of Engineering, a Fellow of the Institution of Mechanical Engineers (IMechE), and a Fellow of the Royal Society of Arts.
