= Magnox (alloy) =

Magnesium-based alloy used in nuclear fuel cladding

Magnox is an alloy—mainly of magnesium with small amounts of aluminium and other metals—used in cladding unenriched uranium metal fuel with a non-oxidising covering to contain fission products in nuclear reactors. Magnox is short for Magnesium non-oxidising.

This material has the advantage of a low neutron capture cross section, but has two major disadvantages:

- It limits the maximum temperature (to about 415 °C), and hence the thermal efficiency, of the plant.
- It reacts with water, preventing long-term storage of spent fuel under water in spent fuel pools.

The magnox alloy Al80 has a composition of 0.8% aluminium and 0.004% beryllium.

== See also ==
- Magnox – nuclear power reactors using this alloy
- Zircaloy – another nuclear fuel cladding alloy
- Nuclear fuel
- Gas-cooled reactor
