= Magnox =

Type of British nuclear reactor

Schematic diagram of a magnox nuclear reactor showing gas flow. The heat exchanger is outside the concrete radiation shielding. This represents an early Magnox design with a cylindrical, steel, pressure vessel.

Magnox is a type of nuclear power / production reactor designed and produced in the United Kingdom. It was designed to run on natural uranium with graphite as the moderator and carbon dioxide gas as the coolant. It belongs to the wider class of gas-cooled reactors. The name comes from the magnesium-aluminium alloy (called magnesium non-oxidising), used to clad the fuel rods inside the reactor. Like most other Generation I reactors, the magnox was designed with the dual purpose of producing electrical power and plutonium-239 for the nascent nuclear weapons programme in Britain. The name refers specifically to the United Kingdom design but is sometimes used generically to refer to any similar reactor.

As with other plutonium-producing reactors, conserving neutrons is a key element of the design. In magnox, the neutrons are moderated in large blocks of graphite. The efficiency of graphite as a moderator allows the magnox to run using natural uranium fuel, in contrast with the more common commercial light-water reactor which requires slightly enriched uranium. Graphite oxidises readily in air, so the core is cooled with CO_{2}, which is then pumped into a heat exchanger to generate steam to drive conventional steam turbine equipment for power production. The core is open on one end, so fuel elements can be added or removed while the reactor is still running. (Online refueling).

The dual-use capability of the magnox design led to the UK building up a large stockpile of fuel-grade (reactor-grade) plutonium, with the aid of the B205 reprocessing facility. The low-to-interim burnup feature of the reactor design would become responsible for changes to US regulatory classifications after the US–UK reactor-grade plutonium detonation test of the 1960s. Despite improvements to the design in later decades as electricity generation became the primary operational aim, magnox reactors were never capable of competing with the higher efficiency and higher fuel burnup of pressurised water reactors.

In total, only a few dozen reactors of this type were constructed, most of them in the UK from the 1950s to the 1970s, with very few exported to other countries. The first magnox reactor to come online was Calder Hall (at the Sellafield site) in 1956, frequently regarded as the world's first commercial nuclear power station, while the last in Britain to shut down was Reactor 1 in Wylfa (on Anglesey) in 2015. As of 2021, North Korea remains the only operator to continue using magnox style reactors, at the Yongbyon Nuclear Scientific Research Center, having restarted it according to International Atomic Energy Agency investigations. The magnox design was superseded by the advanced gas-cooled reactor, which is similarly cooled but includes changes to improve its economic performance.

== General description ==
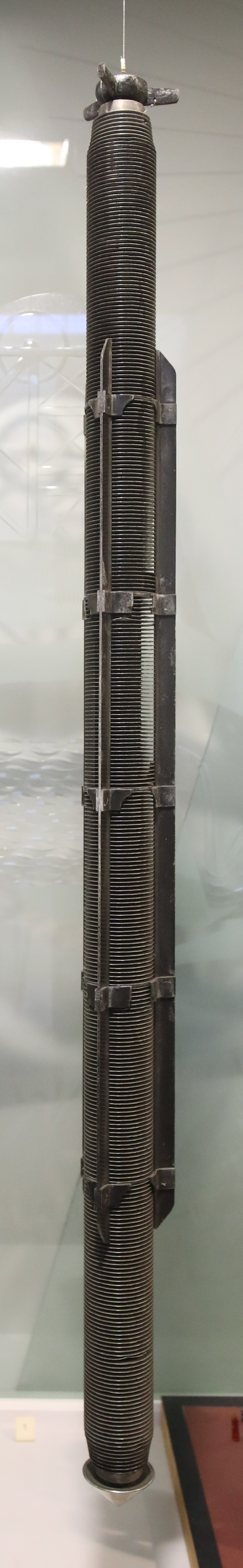
An early design magnox fuel rod

=== Windscale ===
The UK's first full-scale nuclear reactor was the Windscale Pile in Sellafield. The pile was designed for the production of plutonium-239 which was bred in multi-week reactions taking place in natural uranium fuel. Under normal conditions, natural uranium does not absorb enough of its own emitted "fast" neutrons to maintain a chain reaction. To improve the fuel's sensitivity to neutrons, a neutron moderator is used, in this case highly purified graphite.

The reactors consisted of a huge cube of this material (the "pile") made up of many smaller blocks and drilled through horizontally to make a large number of fuel channels. Uranium fuel was placed in aluminium canisters and pushed into the channels in the front, pushing previous fuel canisters through the channel and out the back of the reactor where they fell into a pool of water. The system was designed to work at low temperatures and power levels and was air-cooled with the help of large fans.

Graphite is combustible and presents a serious safety risk. This was demonstrated on 10 October 1957 when Unit 1 of the now two-unit site caught fire. The reactor burned for three days, and massive contamination was only avoided due to the addition of filtering systems that had previously been derided as unnecessary "follies".

=== Magnox ===
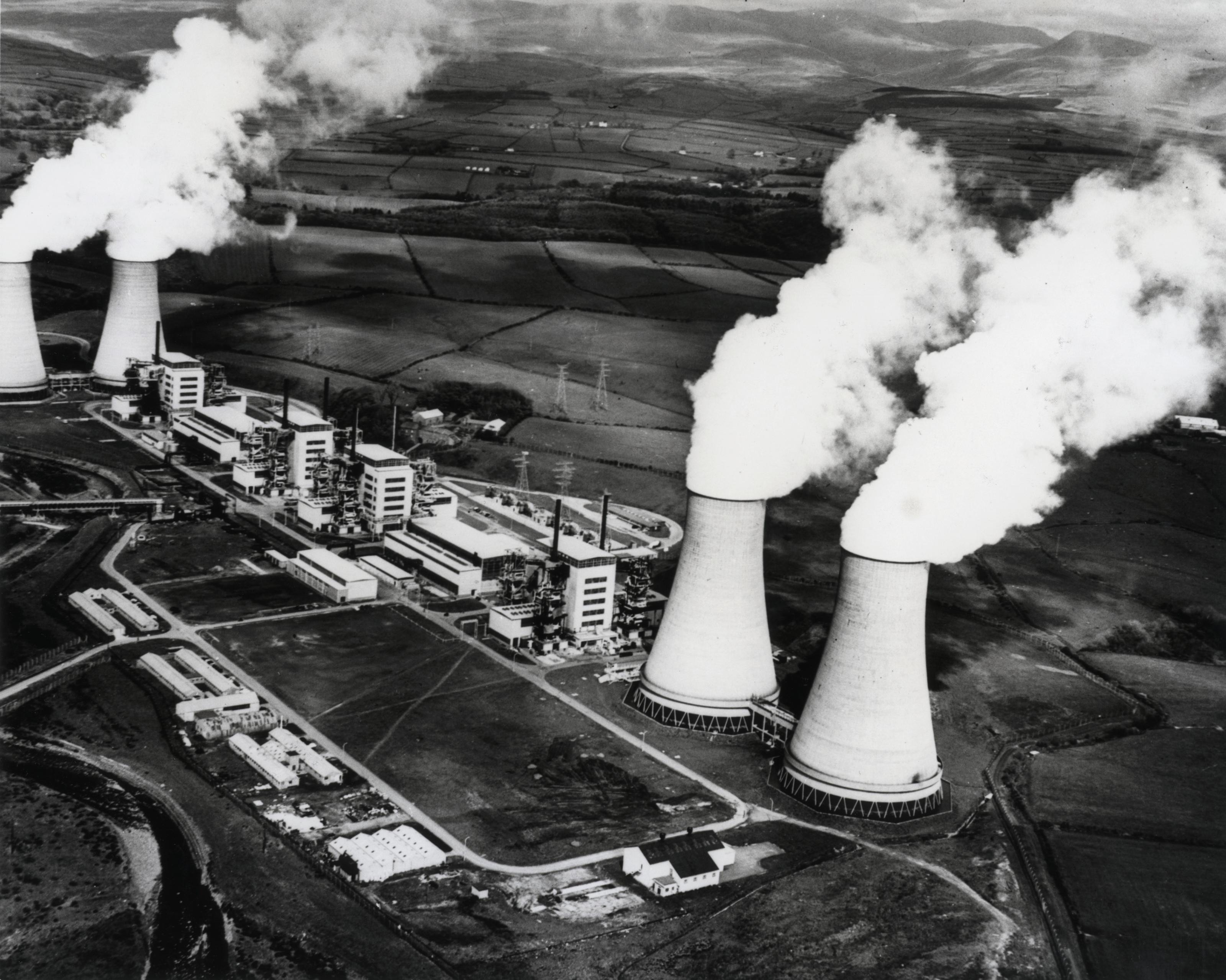
Calder Hall, United Kingdom – The world's first commercial nuclear power station. First connected to the national power grid on 27 August 1956 and officially opened by Queen Elizabeth II on 17 October 1956.

As the UK nuclear establishment began to turn its attention to nuclear power, the need for more plutonium for weapons development remained acute. This led to an effort to adapt the basic Windscale design to a power-producing version that would also produce plutonium. In order to be economically useful the plant would have to run at much higher power levels, and in order to efficiently convert that power to electricity, it would have to run at higher temperatures.

At these power levels, the fire risk is amplified and air cooling is no longer appropriate. In the case of the magnox design, this led to the use of carbon dioxide (CO_{2}) as the coolant. There is no facility in the reactor to adjust the gas flow through the individual channels whilst at power, but gas flow was adjusted by using flow gags attached to the support strut which located into the diagrid. These gags were used to increase flow in the centre of the core and to reduce it at the periphery. Principal control over the reaction rate was provided by a number (48 at Chapelcross and Calder Hall) of boron-steel control rods which could be raised and lowered as required in vertical channels.

At higher temperatures, aluminium is no longer structurally sound, which led to the development of the magnox alloy fuel cladding. Unfortunately, magnox is increasingly reactive with increasing temperature, and the use of this material limited the operational gas temperatures to 360 °C (680 °F), much lower than desirable for efficient steam generation. This limit also meant that the reactors had to be very large in order to generate any given power level, which was further amplified by the use of gas for cooling, as the low thermal capacity of the fluid required very high flow rates.

The magnox fuel elements consisted of refined uranium enclosed in a loose-fitting magnox shell and then pressurised with helium. The outside of the shell was typically finned in order to improve heat exchange with the CO_{2}. Magnox alloy is reactive with water, which means it cannot be left in a cooling pond after extraction from the reactor for extended periods. In contrast to the Windscale layout, the magnox design used vertical fuel channels. This required the fuel shells to lock together end-to-end, or to sit one on top the other to allow them to be pulled out of the channels from the top.

Like the Windscale designs, the later magnox reactors allowed access to the fuel channels and could be refuelled while operating. This was a key criterion for the design because its use of natural uranium leads to low burnup ratios and the requirement for frequent refuelling. For power use, the fuel canisters were left in the reactor as long as possible, while for plutonium production they were removed earlier. The complicated refuelling equipment proved to be less reliable than the reactor systems, and perhaps not advantageous overall.

The entire reactor assembly was placed in a large pressure vessel. Due to the size of the pile, only the reactor core itself was placed within the steel pressure assembly, which was then surrounded by a concrete confinement building (or biological shield). As there was no water in the core, and thus no possibility of a steam explosion, the building was able to tightly wrap the pressure vessel, which helped reduce construction costs. In order to keep the size of the confinement building down, the early magnox designs placed the heat exchanger for the CO_{2} gas outside the dome, connected through piping. Although there were strengths with this approach in that maintenance and access was generally more straightforward, the major weakness was the radiation 'shine' emitted particularly from the unshielded top duct.

The magnox design was an evolution and never truly finalised, and later units differ considerably from earlier ones. As neutron fluxes increased in order to improve power densities problems with neutron embrittlement were encountered, particularly at low temperatures. Later units at Oldbury and Wylfa replaced the steel pressure vessels with prestressed concrete versions which also contained the heat exchangers and steam plant. Working pressure varies from 6.9 to 19.35 bars (690 to 1,935 kPa; 100.1 to 280.6 psi) for the steel vessels, and 24.8 to 27 bars (2,480 to 2,700 kPa; 360 to 392 psi) for the two concrete designs.

No British construction company at the time was large enough to build all the power stations, so various competing consortiums were involved, adding to the differences between the stations; for example, nearly every power station used a different design of magnox fuel element. Most of the magnox builds suffered time overruns and cost escalation.

For the initial start up of the reactor neutron sources were located within the core to provide sufficient neutrons to initiate the nuclear reaction. Other aspects of the design included the use of flux shaping or flattening bars or controls rods to even out (to some extent) the neutron flux density across the core. If not used, the flux in the centre would be very high relative to the outer areas leading to excessive central temperatures and lower power output limited by the temperature of the central areas. Each fuel channel would have several elements stacked one upon another to form a stringer. This required the presence of a latching mechanism to allow the stack to be withdrawn and handled. This caused some problems as the Nimonic springs used contained cobalt, which became irradiated giving high gamma level when removed from the reactor. Additionally, thermocouples were attached to some elements and needed to be removed on fuel discharge from the reactor.

=== AGR ===
The dual-use nature of the magnox design leads to design compromises that limit its economic performance. As the magnox design was being rolled out, work was already underway on the advanced gas-cooled reactor (AGR) with the explicit intention of making the system more economical. Primary among the changes was the decision to run the reactor at much higher temperatures, about 650 °C (1,200 °F), which would greatly improve the efficiency when running the power-extracting steam turbines. This was too hot for the magnox alloy, and the AGR originally intended to use a new beryllium-based cladding, but this proved too brittle. This was replaced by a stainless steel cladding, but this absorbed enough neutrons to affect criticality, and in turn required the design to operate on slightly enriched uranium rather than the magnox's natural uranium, driving up fuel costs. Ultimately the economics of the system proved little better than Magnox. Former Treasury Economic Advisor, David Henderson, described the AGR programme as one of the two most costly British government-sponsored project errors, alongside Concorde.

== Technical information ==
Specification	Calder Hall	Wylfa	Oldbury
Thermal output (gross), MW	182	1875	835
Electrical output (gross), MW	46	590	280
Efficiency, %	23	33	34
Number of fuel channels	1696	6150	3320
Active core diameter	9.45 m	17.4 m	12.8 m
Active core height	6.4 m	9.2 m	8.5 m
Mean gas pressure	7 bar	26.2 bar	25.6 bar
Mean inlet gas temperature °C	140	247	245
Mean outlet gas temperature °C	336	414	410
Total gas flow	891 kg/s	10254 kg/s	4627 kg/s
Material	Natural uranium metal	Natural uranium metal	Natural uranium metal
Mass of uranium in tonnes	120	595	293
Pressure vessel internal diameter	11.28 m	29.3 m	23.5 m
Pressure vessel internal height	21.3 m	—	18.3 m
Gas circulators	4	4	4
Steam generators	4	1	4
Number of generators	2	2	1

== Economics ==
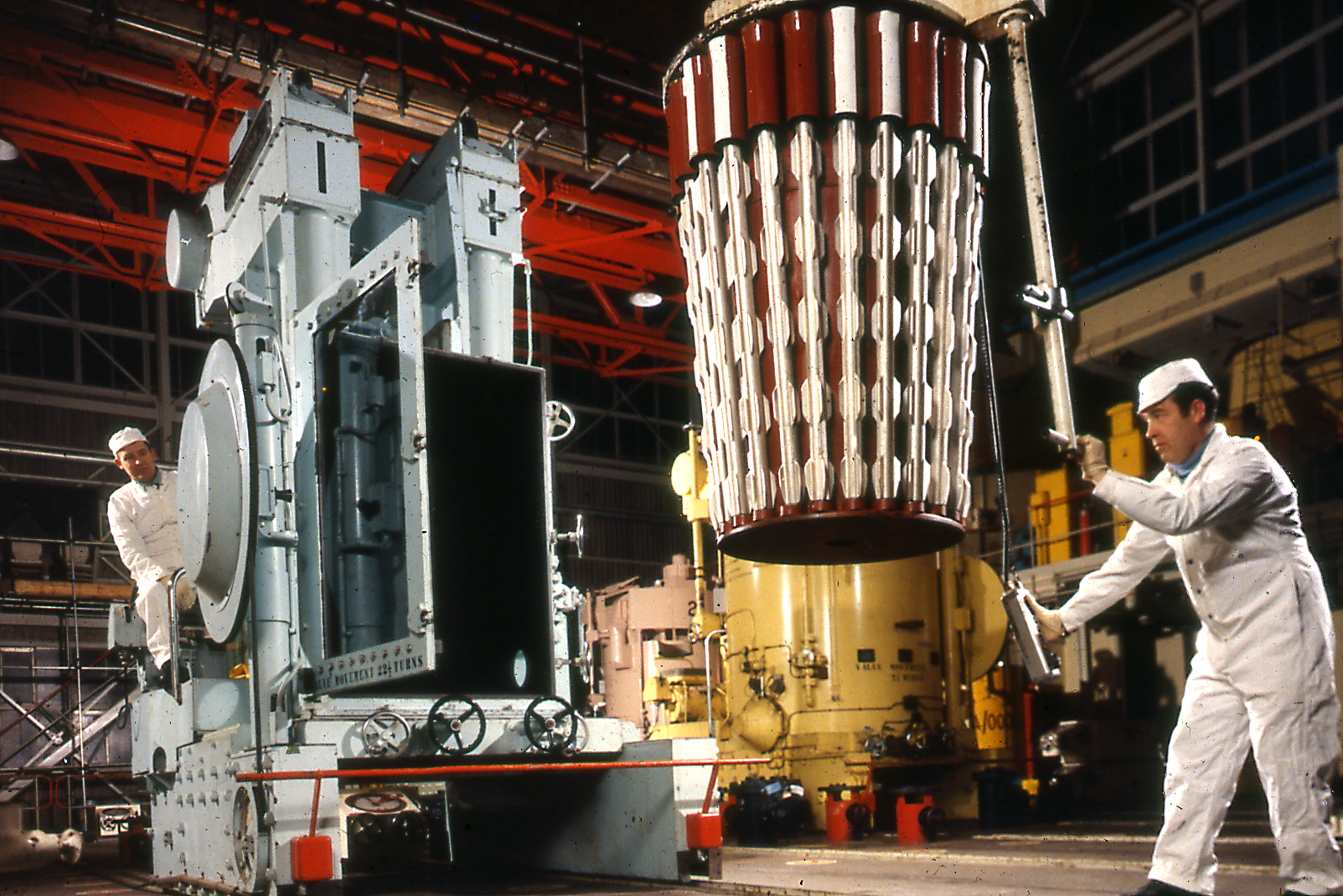
Loading magnox fuel at Calder Hall nuclear power station

The first magnox reactors at Calder Hall were designed principally to produce plutonium for nuclear weapons. The production of plutonium from uranium by irradiation in a pile generates large quantities of heat which must be disposed of, and so generating steam from this heat, which could be used in a turbine to generate electricity, or as process heat in the nearby Windscale works, was seen as a kind of free by-product of an essential process.

The Calder Hall reactors had low efficiency by today's standards, only 18.8%.

The British government decided in 1957 that electricity generation by nuclear power would be promoted, and that there would be a building programme to achieve 5,000 to 6,000 MWe capacity by 1965, a quarter of UK's generating needs. Although Sir John Cockcroft had advised the government that electricity generated by nuclear power would be more expensive than that from coal, the government decided that nuclear power stations as alternatives to coal-fired power stations would be useful to reduce the bargaining power of the coal miners' unions, and so decided to go ahead. In 1960 a government white paper scaled back the building programme to 3,000 MWe, acknowledging that coal generation was 25% cheaper. A government statement to the House of Commons in 1963 stated that nuclear generation was more than twice as expensive as coal. The plutonium credit which assigned a value to the plutonium produced was used to improve the economic case, although the operators of the power stations were never paid this credit.

Once removed from the reactor, the used fuel elements are stored in cooling ponds (with the exception of Wylfa which has dry stores in a carbon dioxide atmosphere) where the decay heat is transferred to the pond water, and then removed by the pond water circulation, cooling and filtration system. The fact that fuel elements can only be stored for a limited period in water before the magnox cladding deteriorates, and must therefore inevitably be reprocessed, added to the costs of the magnox programme.

Later reviews criticised the continuing development project by project instead of standardisation on the most economical design, and for persisting with the development of a reactor which achieved only two export orders.

A retrospective evaluation of costs, using a typical 5% discount rate on capital, estimated magnox electricity costs were nearly 50% higher than coal power stations would have provided.

== Safety ==
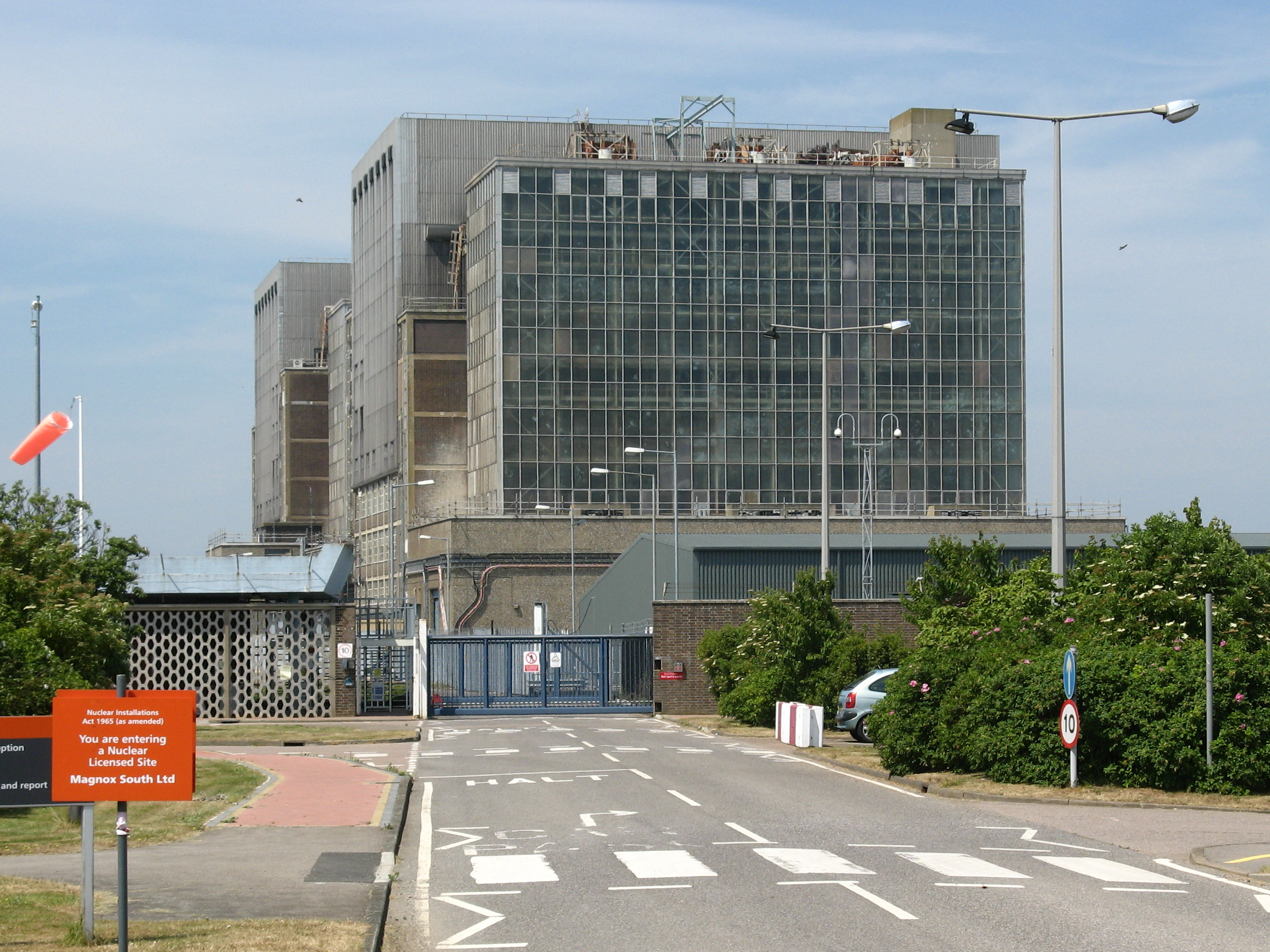
The reactor buildings of Bradwell magnox nuclear power station

The magnox reactors were considered at the time to have a considerable degree of inherent safety because of their simple design, low power density, and gas coolant. Because of this they were not provided with secondary containment features. A safety design principle at the time was that of the "maximum credible accident", and the assumption was made that if the plant were designed to withstand that, then all other lesser but similar events would be encompassed. Loss of coolant accidents (at least those considered in the design) would not cause large-scale fuel failure as the Magnox cladding would retain the bulk of the radioactive material, assuming the reactor was rapidly shutdown (a SCRAM), because the decay heat could be removed by natural circulation of air. As the coolant is already a gas, explosive pressure buildup from boiling is not a risk, as happened in the catastrophic steam explosion at the Chernobyl accident. Failure of the reactor shutdown system to rapidly shut down the reactor, or failure of natural circulation, was not considered in the design. In 1967 Chapelcross experienced a fuel melt due to restricted gas flow in an individual channel and, although this was dealt with by the station crew without major incident, this event had not been designed or planned for, and the radioactivity released was greater than anticipated during the station design.

Despite the belief in their inherently safe design, it was decided that the magnox stations would not be built in heavily populated areas. The positioning constraint decided upon was that any 10-degree sector would have a population less than 500 within 1.5 miles (2.4 km), 10,000 within 5 miles (8.0 km) and 100,000 within 10 miles (16 km). In addition population around the site in all directions would be less than six times the 10-degree limits. Planning permission constraints would be used to prevent any large growth of population within five miles.

In the older steel pressure vessel design, boilers and gas ducting are outside the concrete biological shield. Consequently, this design emits a significant amount of direct gamma and neutron radiation, termed direct shine, from the reactors. For example, the most exposed members of the public living near Dungeness magnox reactor in 2002 received 0.56 mSv, over half the International Commission on Radiological Protection recommended maximum radiation dose limit for the public, from direct shine alone. The doses from the Oldbury and Wylfa reactors, which have concrete pressure vessels which encapsulate the complete gas circuit, are much lower.

== Reactors built ==
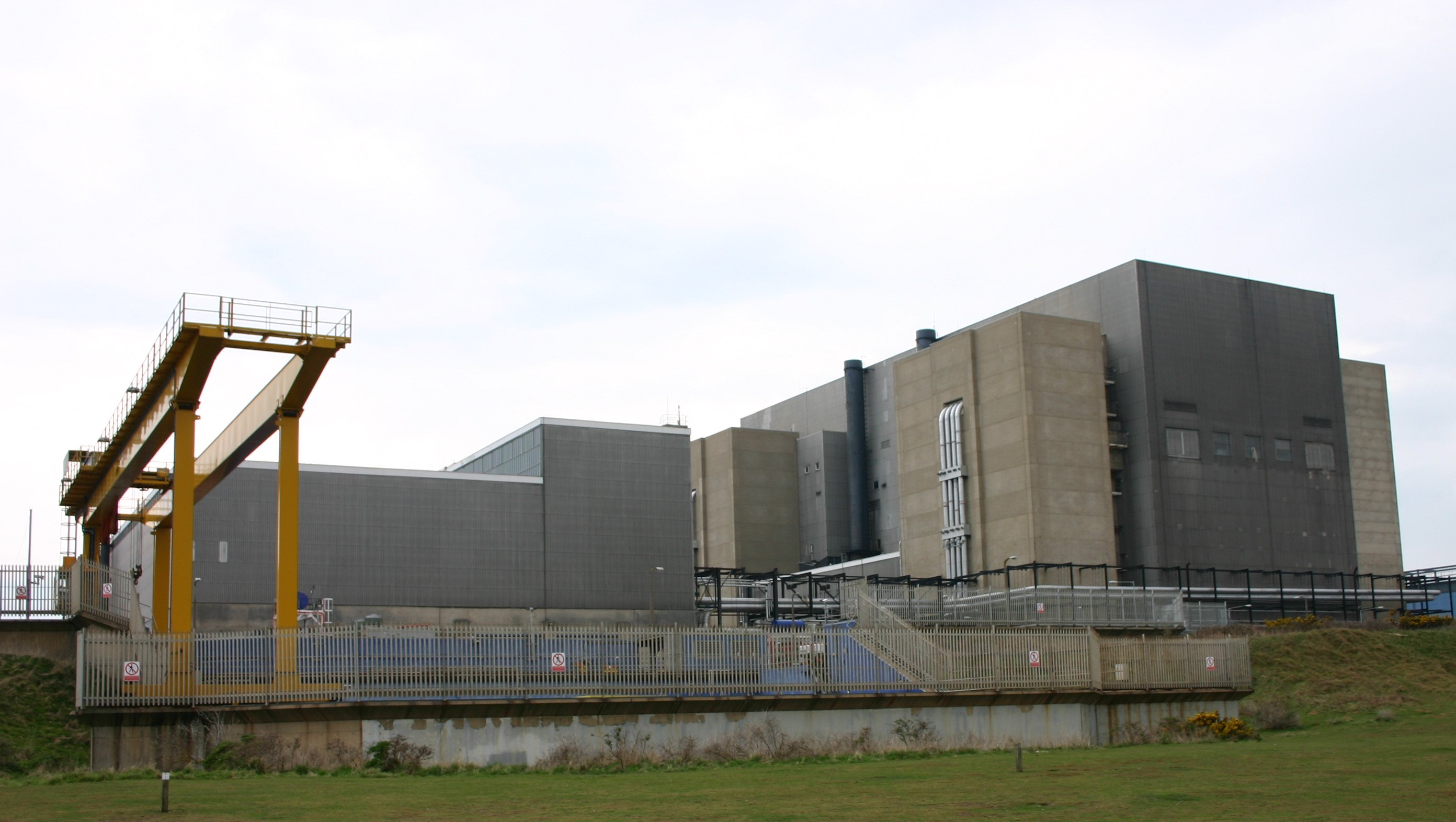
Sizewell A magnox nuclear power station

In all, 11 power stations totalling 26 units were built in the United Kingdom where the design originated. In addition, one was exported to Tōkai in Japan and another to Latina in Italy. North Korea also developed their own magnox reactors, based on the UK design which was made public at an Atoms for Peace conference.

The first magnox power station, Calder Hall, was the world's first nuclear power station to generate electrical power on an industrial scale (a power station in Obninsk, Russia started supplying the grid in very small non-commercial quantities on 1 December 1954). The first connection to the grid was on 27 August 1956, and the plant was officially opened by Queen Elizabeth II on 17 October 1956. When the station closed on 31 March 2003, the first reactor had been in use for nearly 47 years.

The first two stations (Calder Hall and Chapelcross) were originally owned by the UKAEA and primarily used in their early life to produce weapons-grade plutonium, with two fuel loads per year. From 1964 they were mainly used on commercial fuel cycles and in April 1995 the UK Government announced that all production of plutonium for weapons purposes had ceased.

The later and larger units were owned by the CEGB and operated on commercial fuel cycles. However Hinkley Point A and two other stations were modified so that weapons-grade plutonium could be extracted for military purposes should the need arise.

=== Derating to reduce corrosion ===
In early operation it was found that there was significant oxidation of mild steel components by the high temperature carbon dioxide coolant, requiring a reduction in operating temperature and power output. For example, the Latina reactor was derated in 1969 by 24%, from 210 MWe to 160 MWe, by the reduction of operating temperature from 390 to 360 °C (734 to 680 °F).

=== Last operating magnox reactor ===
The Nuclear Decommissioning Authority (NDA) announced on 30 December 2015 that Wylfa Unit 1 – the world's last operating Magnox reactor – was closed. The unit had generated electricity for five years longer than originally planned. Two units at Wylfa were both scheduled to shut down at the end of 2012, but the NDA decided to shut down Unit 2 in April 2012 so that Unit 1 could continue operating in order to fully utilise existing stocks of fuel, which was no longer being manufactured.

The small 5 MWe experimental reactor, based on the magnox design, at Yongbyon in North Korea, continues to operate as of 2026.

== Magnox definitions ==
=== Magnox alloy ===
Magnox is also the name of an alloy—mainly of magnesium with small amounts of aluminium and other metals—used in cladding unenriched uranium metal fuel with a non-oxidising covering to contain fission products. Magnox is short for magnesium non-oxidising. This material has the advantage of a low neutron capture cross-section, but has two major disadvantages:

- It limits the maximum temperature, and hence the thermal efficiency, of the plant.
- It reacts with water, preventing long-term storage of spent fuel under water.

Magnox fuel incorporated cooling fins to provide maximum heat transfer despite low operating temperatures, making it expensive to produce. While the use of uranium metal rather than oxide made reprocessing more straightforward and therefore cheaper, the need to reprocess fuel a short time after removal from the reactor meant that the fission product hazard was severe. Expensive remote handling facilities were required to address this danger.

=== Magnox plants ===
The term magnox may also loosely refer to:

- Three North Korean reactors, all based on the declassified blueprints of the Calder Hall magnox reactors:
  - A small 5 MWe experimental reactor at Yongbyon, operated from 1986 to 1994, and restarted in 2003. Plutonium from this reactor's spent fuel has been used in the North Korea nuclear weapons program.
  - A 50 MWe reactor, also at Yongbyon, whose construction commenced in 1985 but was never finished in accord with the 1994 US-North Korea Agreed Framework.
  - A 200 MWe reactor at Taechon, construction of which also halted in 1994.
- Nine UNGG power reactors built in France, all now shut down. These were carbon dioxide-cooled, graphite reactors with natural uranium metal fuel, very similar in design and purpose to the British magnox reactors except that the fuel cladding was magnesium-zirconium alloy and that the bars were disposed horizontally (instead of vertically for magnox).

== Decommissioning ==
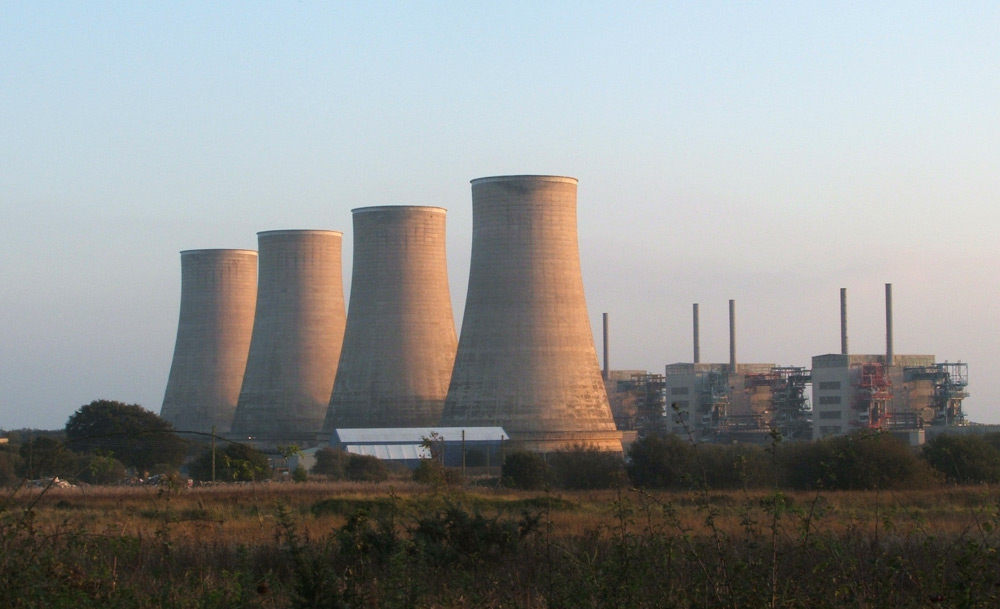
Chapelcross before the cooling towers were demolished in 2007

The Nuclear Decommissioning Authority (NDA) is responsible for the decommissioning of the UK magnox power plants, at an estimated cost of £12.6 billion. There has been debate about whether a 25 or 100-year decommissioning strategy should be adopted. After 80 years short-lifetime radioactive material in the defuelled core would have decayed to the point that human access to the reactor structure would be possible, easing dismantling work. A shorter decommissioning strategy would require a robotic core dismantling technique. The current approximately 100-year decommissioning plan is called Safestore. A 130-year Deferred Safestore Strategy was also considered, with an estimated cost saving of £1.4 billion, but not selected.

In addition the Sellafield site which, amongst other activities, reprocessed spent magnox fuel, has an estimated decommissioning cost of £31.5 billion. Magnox fuel was produced at Springfields near Preston; estimated decommissioning cost is £371 million. The total cost of decommissioning magnox activities is likely to exceed £20 billion, averaging about £2 billion per productive reactor site.

Calder Hall was opened in 1956 as the world's first commercial nuclear power station, and is a significant part of the UK's industrial heritage. The NDA is considering whether to preserve Calder Hall reactor 1 as a museum site.

All the UK's magnox reactor sites (apart from Calder Hall) are operated by Magnox Ltd, a subsidiary of the NDA.

Reactor Sites Management Company (RSMC), a NDA Site Licence Company (SLC), originally held the contract to manage Magnox Ltd on behalf of the NDA. In 2007, RSMC was acquired by American nuclear fuel cycle service provider EnergySolutions from British Nuclear Fuels.

On 1 October 2008, Magnox Electric Ltd separated into two nuclear licensed companies, Magnox North Ltd and Magnox South Ltd.

Magnox North sites

- Chapelcross
- Hunterston A
- Oldbury
- Trawsfynydd
- Wylfa

Magnox South sites

- Berkeley
- Bradwell
- Dungeness A
- Hinkley Point A

In January 2011 Magnox North Ltd and Magnox South Ltd recombined as Magnox Ltd. Following procurement and management issues with the contract, Magnox Ltd will become a subsidiary of the NDA in September 2019.

== List of Magnox reactors in the UK ==
Name	Location	Location (GeoHack)	Number of units	Production per unit	Total production	First grid connection	Shut down
Calder Hall	near Whitehaven, Cumbria	NY025042	4	50 MWe	200 MWe	1956	2003
Chapelcross	near Annan, Dumfries and Galloway	NY216697	4	60 MWe	240 MWe	1959	2004
Berkeley	Gloucestershire	ST659994	2	138 MWe	276 MWe	1962	1989
Bradwell	near Southminster, Essex	TM001087	2	121 MWe	242 MWe	1962	2002
Hunterston "A"	between West Kilbride and Fairlie North Ayrshire	NS183513	2	180 MWe	360 MWe	1964	1990
Hinkley Point "A"	near Bridgwater, Somerset	TR330623	2	235 MWe	470 MWe	1965	1999
Trawsfynydd	Gwynedd	SH690381	2	195 MWe	390 MWe	1965	1991
Dungeness "A"	Kent	TR074170	2	219 MWe	438 MWe	1966	2006
Sizewell "A"	near Leiston, Suffolk	TM472634	2	210 MWe	420 MWe	1966	2006
Oldbury	near Thornbury, South Gloucestershire	ST606945	2	217 MWe	434 MWe	1968	2012
Wylfa	Anglesey	SH350937	2	490 MWe	980 MWe	1971	2015

== Magnox reactors exported from the UK ==
Name	Location	Number of units	Production per unit	Total production	First grid connection	Shut down
Latina	Italy	1	160 MWe	160 MWe	1963	1987 following Italian referendum on nuclear power
Tokai Mura	Japan	1	166 MWe	166 MWe	1966	1998

== See also ==
- Nuclear power in the United Kingdom
- UNGG, the similar class of reactors built in France
- Edge of Darkness, 1985 British television drama about the nuclear industry, which went by the working title "Magnox".
