= Nuclear Liabilities Fund =

Fund to cover decommissioning of nuclear power stations in the UK

The Nuclear Liabilities Fund (formerly the Nuclear Generation Decommissioning Fund) is a fund of the UK Government to provide arrangements for funding certain long-term costs for the decommissioning of eight nuclear power stations formerly owned by British Energy, now EDF Energy. Responsibility for the fund within government lies with the Department for Energy Security and Net Zero.

The fund is incorporated as a limited company registered in Scotland and is owned by the Nuclear Trust. It consists of five trustees, three appointed by the Secretary of State for Energy Security and Net Zero and two by the owners of the nuclear power stations, now EDF Energy. The trustees are also directors of the Fund as well as owning the ordinary share capital of the Fund.

== History ==
The Nuclear Generation Decommissioning Fund was established on 28 March 1996 by the UK Government with £260m as part of the preparations for the privatisation of British Energy. It covered the nuclear power stations owned by the company on 20 March 1996, comprising seven advanced gas cooled reactor (AGR) stations and one pressurised water reactor (PWR) station. The obligations of the Fund were set out in an agreement known as the Nuclear Decommissioning Agreement. The Fund had an initial endowment of £232 million and thereafter received £4 million a quarter from British Energy, adjusted each year in line with RPI.

On 14 January 2005, following the restructuring of British Energy after it required financial assistance from the government, the original agreement was terminated. It was replaced by the Contribution Agreement (CA) and the Nuclear Liabilities Funding Agreement (NLFA). Broadly, these agreements resulted in the following:

- The renaming of the fund as the Nuclear Liabilities Fund.
- Changes in decommissioning arrangements set out in the CA and the NLFA, such that the fund continued to have the object of discharging the decommissioning liabilities of British Energy but also certain contracted and uncontracted nuclear liabilities. The Secretary of State agreed to fund these liabilities to the extent that they might exceed all the assets of the fund.
- British Energy continued to pay quarterly contributions of £6 million but in addition the fund received £275 million in 7% Guaranteed Bonds issued by British Energy, entitlement to 65% of British Energy's free cashflow in each year and £150,000 per tonne in respect of fuel loaded at Sizewell B, the UK's sole PWR station.
- The trustees ceased to have responsibility for adequacy. The newly created Nuclear Decommissioning Authority (NDA) became responsible for determining liabilities. A first review of the fund was due to be carried out in January 2015 by the Fund and at each ten-year anniversary thereafter or at any time after 2015 on the instigation of the Secretary of State.

Part of the Fund's interest in British Energy was realised on 31 May 2007, when it converted approximately 30% of its entitlement to British Energy's free cashflow into 450 million British Energy shares. These were immediately sold to investors at a price of £5.20 per share, raising £2.34 billion.

On 19 January 2009, the Fund sold its remaining 36% interest in British Energy following the takeover of the company by EDF Energy. The sale raised a further £4.421 billion, taking the total Fund value at that date to £8.3 billion. This is to be invested to fund the long term decommissioning costs of EDF's eight former British Energy nuclear stations, plus certain other contracted and uncontracted nuclear liabilities relating to the assets as they arise.

By 2025, the fund has paid out £2.4bn to discharge decommissioning liabilities, and held £20.7bn, mostly in the National Loans Fund. It has interests in the Sizewell C nuclear power station project, and grid battery projects.

== See also ==
- Nuclear power in the United Kingdom
