= Bradwell B nuclear power station =

Proposed nuclear power station in Essex, England

Bradwell B nuclear power station (BRB)
- Country: England
- Location: Bradwell-on-Sea, Essex
- Coordinates: 51°44′29″N 0°53′49″E
- Status: Proposed
Owner
China General Nuclear Power Group	(66.5%)
EDF Energy	(33.5%)
- Operator: NNB Generation Company

Nuclear power station
- Reactor type: PWR

Power generation
- Units planned: 2
- Nameplate capacity: 2.2 GW

External links
- Website: https://bradwellb.co.uk/

Bradwell B is a proposed nuclear power station at Bradwell-on-Sea in Essex, put forward by China General Nuclear Power Group (CGN). If constructed, the site will provide 2,200 MWe of nuclear power from two UK HPR1000 reactors developed by CGN and the China National Nuclear Corporation (CNNC). It will be located close to the decommissioned Bradwell nuclear power station.

== History ==
In January 2008, the UK government gave the go ahead to construct new nuclear power stations in the UK, with all sites being located adjacent to existing power stations. The government followed this decision in 2010 by selecting ten sites, including Bradwell, at which companies could develop nuclear power stations; this was reduced to eight by October 2010.

In 2013, CGN entered negotiations with EDF Energy to invest in the UK's nuclear industry. Out of these negotiations, which ended in 2015, agreements were made relating to Hinkley Point C and Sizewell C, as well as Bradwell B, which led to EDF Energy taking a majority share in both the Hinkley Point C and Sizewell C projects and CGN taking a 66.5% majority share in the Bradwell B project. The agreement also led to CGN bringing its own technology to the Bradwell B project, with the Chinese designed and developed Hualong One reactor expected to be used.

On 19 January 2017, the United Kingdom Office for Nuclear Regulation and the Environment Agency started the Generic Design Assessment process for the Hualong One reactor, expected to be completed in 2021, in advance of possible deployment at the Bradwell B site. In November 2020, it was announced that the HPR1000 reactor design had successfully passed all the steps of the compliance analysis against the European Utility Requirements Document.

CGN has planned for the project to have a two-stage consultation programme. The stage 1 consultation started on 4 March and ended on 1 July 2020.

CGN applied to Ofgem for an electricity generating licence in June 2020; this was granted on 16 December 2020.

By 2021, the British government's attitude to the involvement of China in British nuclear power had changed following the worsening of China–United Kingdom relations, and it was exploring ways to block Chinese involvement in the development.

In February 2022, the UK HPR1000 reactor completed its General Design Assessment process after the ONR issued a Design Acceptance Confirmation (DAC) and the Environment Agency issued a Statement of Design Acceptability (SoDA) for the design.

== Timeline ==
Stage	Status	Date Completed	Notes
Statement of community consultation	Completed	March 2020	
Stage 1 consultation	Completed	1 July 2020	
Updated statement of community consultation	In Progress	-	
Stage 2 consultation	Not Yet Started	-	
Review of Stage 2 responses	Not Yet Started	-	
Application submission	Not Yet Started	-	
Decision	Not Yet Started	-	
Construction	Not Yet Started	-	
Operation	Not Yet Started	-	

== Funding ==
Funding for the Bradwell B project would be provided by CGN and EDF Energy, who will have during the development phase of the project 66.5% and 33.5% stakes in the project.

The cost of building Bradwell B would be very significant, but with so many variables affecting the development of the project it is not possible at this early stage to provide an exact figure. These variables could include: design changes, or changes to the way that Bradwell B would be constructed as a result of surveys, consultation and regulatory decisions; the options we choose for transportation and worker accommodation; how the supply chain forms; decisions made on financing Bradwell B; and cost savings we identify from our experience of constructing the HPR1000 design at other sites.

— FAQs - Bradwell B Project Site

As of 21 July 2020, the consortium is looking towards the government for financial backing with the Regulated Asset Base model, which the consortium will discuss at the appropriate time.

== Construction ==
Construction of the project is expected to take between nine and 12 years, with it taking nine years to build and commission the reactors, and three additional years for site restoration. The construction phase is expected to create tens of thousands of jobs, with an additional 3,000 local jobs at the peak of construction. The project, once operational, is expected to create 900 jobs, which will increase by 1000 during outages, which are expected to occur around every 18 months during operation.

Construction would take place in five main stages:

- Stage 1 - Site preparation (24–36 months): involving excavation and major earthworks as well as construction of temporary roads, bulk material delivery facilities, canteens, medical facilities and parking.
- Stage 2 - Civil construction (29–38 months): including major building construction and installation of the reactor dome.
- Stage 3 - Installation (27–33 months): installing the main components of the power station and creating the systems needed for commissioning.
- Stage 4 - Commissioning (14–20 months): including testing, fuel loading, and synchronisation to the grid before handover to operations.
- Stage 5 - Site restoration (24–36 months): completing landscaping works and restoring parts of the site around the facility that are not needed during operation. Removal of temporary construction facilities will also occur during this period.

=== Design ===
The Bradwell B project uses two HPR1000 UK reactors which are developed by CGN and CNNC. The reactor is designed with a power output of 1,170 MWe gross, 1,090 MWe net, with a 60-year design life, and would use a combination of passive and active safety systems with a double containment. The reference plant for Bradwell B is units 3 and 4 of Fangchenggang Nuclear Power Plant located in Guangxi, China. Both units have been operating commercially since March 2023 & May 2024 respectively.

== Criticism ==
In 2016, the US Justice Department charged CGN with stealing nuclear secrets from the United States. The Guardian reported: "According to the US Department of Justice, the FBI has discovered evidence that China General Nuclear Power (CGN) has been engaged in a conspiracy to steal US nuclear secrets stretching back almost two decades. Both CGN and one of the corporation's senior advisers, Szuhsiung Ho, have been charged with conspiring to help the Chinese government develop nuclear material in a manner that is in clear breach of US law." As a result of this, the USA has expressed concern over CGN taking a stake in the UK's nuclear industry, and is strongly opposed to the Bradwell B project as CGN will be the main developer in the project, whereas in past projects it has been a funding partner.

Concerns were once again raised in 2020, this time by a senior Conservative MP, about CGN having a role in the UK's infrastructure, following the UK government's decision to exclude another Chinese firm, Huawei from the UK's 5G infrastructure over espionage concerns. Following this, nuclear industry executives confirmed that the Bradwell B project is also of major concern, especially within the Conservative government. The Financial Times reported on 6 August 2020 that a group of 'rebel Conservative MPs' are now turning their attention to the Bradwell B project as well as CGN's involvement in the Sizewell C project, following success at reversing the government's stance on Huawei. The article claimed that at a private meeting with MPs last month, CGN's activities were raised with the United States Secretary of State, Mike Pompeo. The article also claims that the senior Conservative MP, Iain Duncan Smith, has called for a review of nuclear contracts as he claims that China is not a "trusted vendor", and has compared the UK's dealings with Beijing to 1930s appeasement of Nazi Germany.

Concerns over CGN's involvement in the project continued to be raised by Duncan Smith, who was reported saying in The Daily Telegraph that "Our energy policy is in the hands of the Chinese, Just in that one sector, we have complete domination by China when we should be strategically reviewing it". It was also reported in the Asia Times that Steve Thomas, a professor of energy policy at London's University of Greenwich, said that CGN's ambitions in the UK were "an important step" in presenting the Chinese group's technology to the world, and that "All CGN wanted from the UK was the prestige and endorsement". With CGN being the lead partner in the Bradwell project, Thomas said that UK approval "will be a political decision" as to whether the project continues. Thomas also said that if the project is cancelled, it could threaten CGN's involvement in Hinkley Point C and Sizewell C depending on whether it wants to "punish" the UK or not. In September 2020, following Hitachi's decision to withdraw from the Wylfa and Oldbury projects, the BBC reported that the UK government was looking to replace CGN as an investor at Sizewell C, and that CGN was unlikely to be allowed to proceed with Bradwell B "given revived security concerns and deteriorating diplomatic relations".

== See also ==
- Nuclear power in the United Kingdom
- Energy policy of the United Kingdom
- Energy in the United Kingdom
- List of nuclear reactors in the United Kingdom
- Proposed nuclear power stations in the United Kingdom
- Hinkley Point C nuclear power station
