= Sizewell C nuclear power station =

Nuclear power station under construction

Sizewell C nuclear power station (SZC)
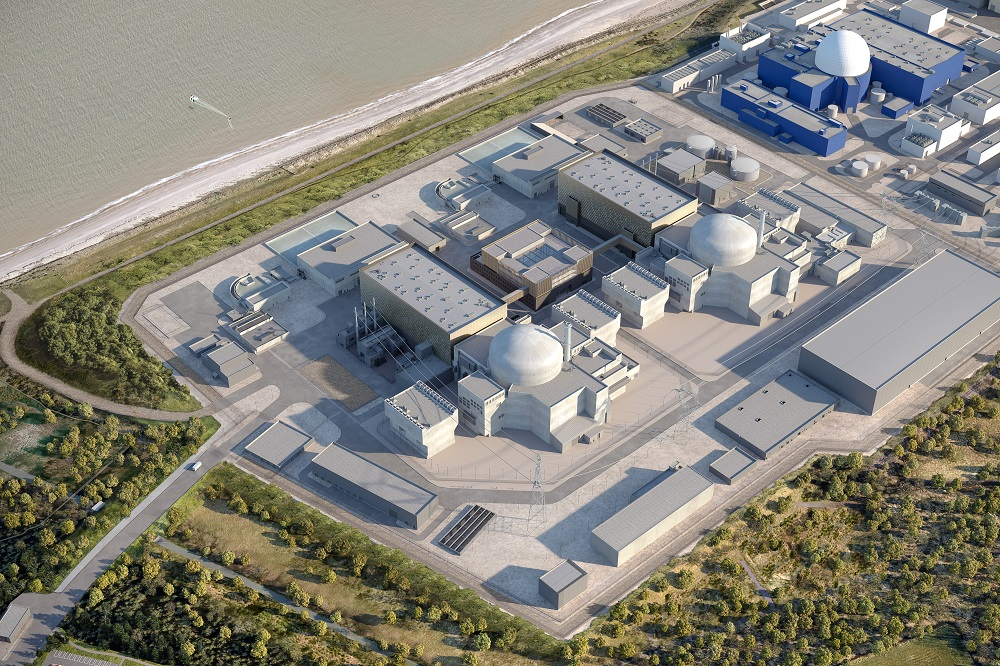
- 3D Image of how Sizewell C (middle) will appear in relation to Sizewell B (top right)
- Country: England
- Location: Suffolk
- Coordinates: 52.2193°N 1.6203°E
- Status: Preliminary works underway
- Construction began: 2023 (site preparation)
- Construction cost: £38 billion
- Owners: UK Government (44.9%); La Caisse (20%); Centrica (15%); EDF (12.5%); Amber Infrastructure (7.6%)
- Operator: NNB Generation Company

Nuclear power station
- Reactor type: PWR
- Reactor supplier: Framatome
- Cooling source: Sea water from North Sea
- Thermal capacity: 2 × 4,524 MW_{th} (planned)

Power generation
- Make and model: EPR
- Units planned: 2 × 1,630 MW_{e}
- Nameplate capacity: 3,260 MW_{e} (planned)

External links
- Website: www.sizewellc.com
- Commons: Related media on Commons

Sizewell C is a nuclear power station under construction at Sizewell in Suffolk, England. It will consist of two EPR reactors with a combined capacity of 3,200 MWe. The project was proposed by a consortium of EDF Energy and China General Nuclear Power Group, who at the time owned 80% and 20% of the project respectively. The site is adjacent to the current Sizewell B nuclear power station.

In 2022, the UK Government announced a buy-out to allow for the exit of CGN from the project and forming a 50% stake with EDF, though EDF expected this to fall below 20% following anticipated external investment. The final investment decision was made on 22 July 2025, with the UK government taking an initial shareholding of 44.9% (specifically the Secretary of State for Energy Security and Net Zero), with the remainder consisting of La Caisse, Centrica, EDF, and Amber Infrastructure. The power station is expected to meet up to 7% of the UK's electricity demand, once the addition has been constructed.

The project commenced in 2024, with construction taking between nine and twelve years, depending on developments at the Hinkley Point C nuclear power station, which is also being developed by EDF Energy and which shares major similarities with the Sizewell plant. The reactors are expected to have a service lifetime of 60 years.

The project has drawn criticism from some who live near the site, as well as environmentalists including Royal Society for the Protection of Birds spokespeople who noted that four acres of woodland would be cut down, and were anxious that the site would encroach on RSPB Minsmere: a nature reserve which is immediately adjacent to the new site.

== History ==
In 2008, the government decided that new nuclear sites should be constructed on existing sites to replace the UK's ageing fleet of reactors. In 2010 the government revealed that the Sizewell power station site was one of the eight locations at which it intended to allow the development to occur. Following this, EDF Energy put forward proposals for the Sizewell site in November 2012, where it planned to construct two EPR reactors.

In 2015, as a part of the government's strategy to open the UK up to China, it was reported that after talks with China agreements had been made to develop three nuclear power plants including Sizewell C, Hinkley Point C and Bradwell B; however, agreements had not yet been made over financing the Sizewell project, with the final agreement likely to be made after the construction of Hinkley Point C had started.

On 21 October 2015, EDF Energy announced that it had 'agreed the Heads of Terms of a wider UK partnership for the joint development of new nuclear power stations at Sizewell in Suffolk and Bradwell in Essex' with China General Nuclear Power Group (CGN). At the same time, EDF Energy also announced that it 'will take an 80% share and CGN will take a 20% share' during the development phase of the project.

Following extensive consultation with the local community, on 27 May 2020 EDF Energy announced that it had submitted a development consent order application. EDF stated that 25,000 job opportunities would be created and targeted 70% of the investment to be spent in UK. The plant would largely replicate the Hinkley Point C design to reuse experience and attempt to lower costs.

In June 2020, EDF had yet to organise financing, and could not take on more construction risk in the UK. EDF was looking to the UK government to assist with financing either by offering a Regulated Asset Base (RAB) model used on less risky infrastructure, though that puts an immediate cost burden on end consumers, or with other approaches such as a government equity stake in the development.

On 30 June 2020, EDF Energy announced that it had applied to the Office for Nuclear Regulation (ONR) for a licence to build and operate Sizewell C. The ONR is responsible for the safe operation of nuclear sites in the UK and for permitting new nuclear site licences – one of the key regulatory requirements for building and operating a new power station.

On 11 September 2020, Suffolk county council said that it could not support the plans for the construction of Sizewell C in its current form, with the council saying on 23 October 2020 that the plans "do not go far enough" to mitigate the impact on the local community and on the local environment. The council said that a lack of support for the project was not the issue, and that it is that EDF "simply does not appropriately and sensitively address the impacts on our communities and the environment". EDF responded by submitting significant changes to the project which aimed to significantly reduce the number of Heavy Goods Vehicles delivering the materials required for the project by having them delivered by train and sea instead. The plans also proposed to increase the amount of land for the creation of fen meadow to help increase the net gain of biodiversity following the completion of the project. A consultation period began on 16 November 2020, which lasted for 30 days and which will inform all of the stakeholders in the project about the proposals.

On 31 October 2020, the BBC claimed that the government was 'close' to giving the project the green light following intensified talks with EDF, with government officials insisting that it "remains committed to new nuclear" following the withdrawal of Horizon from Wylfa and Oldbury. The BBC also reported that the government had increased its interest in taking a stake in the project following work on the second reactor at Hinkley Point C being completed 30% faster than the first reactor, which 'is thought to have substantially mitigated' the risk in taking a stake in the project.

On 14 December 2020, the UK government published an energy white paper setting out its plans to "transition to net zero", and announced the start of negotiations with EDF, with a view to starting investment on "at least one" new power station before the end of the current parliament in 2024. CGN is thought to be planning to withdraw from the project.

On 20 July 2022, the planning application was approved and a Development Consent Order was issued by the Secretary of State.

On 3 November 2022, the plant was placed under review in the government's effort to cut spending. Chancellor of the Exchequer Jeremy Hunt confirmed on 17 November 2022 that construction would go ahead, with initial contracts to be signed "within weeks". Security concerns about China caused the government to buy CGN out of the development for just over £100 million in late 2022, leaving it co-owned by EDF and the UK government.

On 15 January 2024, construction of Sizewell C formally began; Aldeburgh & Leiston Councillor Tom Daly stated that "Sizewell C Ltd confirmed that the construction of Sizewell C new nuclear power station commenced on Monday".

In September 2026, the first freight train reached the Sizewell C temporary construction area via an extension to the existing Sizewell branch line. The aim is for 60% of site materials to be delivered by rail or sea.

== Timeline ==
Stage	Status	Date Completed	Notes
Statement of community consultation	Completed	2012	
Stage 1 consultation	Completed	6 February 2013	
Updated statement of community consultation	Completed	November 2016	
Stage 2 consultation	Completed	3 February 2017	
Stage 3 consultation	Completed	29 March 2019	
Stage 4 consultation	Completed	27 September 2019	
Review of Stage 4 responses	Completed	-	
Application submission	Completed	24 June 2020	
Development consent decision	Completed	20 July 2022	
Groundworks	Started	15 January 2024	
Final Investment Decision	Completed	22 July 2025	
Core construction	Not Yet Started	-	
Operation	Not Yet Started	-	

== Construction ==
The Sizewell C project is expected to take between nine and twelve years to construct and commission. EDF expects significant time and cost savings compared to the near-identical sister plant, Hinkley Point C. The projected construction cost of £20 billion (including "expected inflation and contingencies") for Sizewell C in the 2020 development consent submission is 25% higher than the £16 billion (2012 prices) projected for Hinkley Point C during the planning process. Note that the £20 billion figure was calculated by inflation adjusting 80% of the cost estimate of Hinkley Point C at that time.

== Financing history ==
Major non-government equity investors in Sizewell C (not including debt and public guarantees)
Investor	Equity (£ bilion)	Stake%
La Caisse (CDPQ)	1.7	20%
Centrica	1.4	15%
EDF	1.1	12.5%
Amber Infrastructure Group	0.25	3%
Nuclear Liabilities Fund, co-owned by EDF and UK government, managed by Amber	–	7.6% (option for 10%)

As of July 2025, the Sizewell C project is expected to cost £38 billion. It was originally expected to cost £20 billion to £30 billion. The project was initially led by EDF Energy and CGN, which in 2020 owned 80% and 20% of the project, respectively.

EDF sought UK government assistance with financing either by offering a Regulated Asset Base model, though that puts an immediate cost burden on end consumers, or with other approaches such as a government equity stake in the development, as the company is unwilling to take on further risk within the UK. On 30 June 2020, EDF announced that it had applied to the Office for Nuclear Regulation for a licence to build and operate Sizewell C.

On 14 July 2020, 32 companies and organisations from the UK nuclear supply chain formed a consortium to encourage the government to support the state-guaranteed financing model for Sizewell C, Regulated Asset Base, which the consortium says would reduce the cost of new nuclear projects by having consumers pay the cost upfront through their energy bills.

On 30 September 2020, Jean-Bernard Lévy, EDF's chairman and CEO, demanded that the Treasury provided clarity on the future of nuclear funding following Hitachi's withdrawal from the Wylfa Newydd nuclear power station project which was set to cost £20 billion, citing a lack of viable funding.

On 14 December 2020, following the release of the UK government's long-awaited energy white paper, the government announced that it had started consultations with EDF to take a stake in the project following concerns that CGN is backing out of the project, which would leave a financing gap. The government also warned that any stake in the project would be 'subject to approval on areas such as value for money and affordability' with the Secretary of State for Business, Energy and Industrial Strategy, Alok Sharma, saying, "We are starting negotiations with EDF, it is not a green light on the construction".

In January 2022, the UK government invested £100 million towards continued development of the project. In March 2022, it was announced that the UK government and EDF would each take a 20% stake in the project, with infrastructure investors and pension funds expected to take up the remaining 60%. Funding was also agreed to improve local activities, courtesy of the Sizewell C and the East Anglia Array projects.

In August 2022, The Guardian reported expected costs were £20 billion to be paid with £1.7 billion of taxpayer money and a surcharge on customer energy bills through the Regulated Asset Base model. Barclays had been hired to find new financial backing.

In November 2022, the UK government announced that it was taking over a 50% stake in the project for £679 million. In February 2023, EDF confirmed that following anticipated external investment its shareholding in the project will be no more than 19.9%. Project costs estimates vary from £20 billion to £35 billion.

In September 2023, the UK government issued a pre-qualification questionnaire to prospective investors; successful applicants will be invited to participate in the bidding process. The government have made an additional £511 million available for project development and site preparation ahead of the bidding process.

In January 2024, the UK government announced £1.3 billion of additional funding for the project for infrastructure work such as roads and rail lines, allowing construction work to progress prior to the final investment decision being made.

In August 2024, the UK government announced up to £5.5 billion of additional funding through the Sizewell C Development Expenditure (Devex) Subsidy Scheme "to enable continued support to the development of the proposed new nuclear power plant Sizewell C (SZC) to the point of a Final Investment Decision (FID)", "provided subject to relevant approvals, including the upcoming Spending Review". In the subsequent Autumn Budget, the UK government provided "£2.7 billion of funding to continue Sizewell C's development through 2025-26", however "HM Treasury has clarified that the £2.7bn is not new funding but rather a sum that would be invested either via the previously announced £5.5bn Devex scheme, or through a separate FID subsidy scheme that would be established at the point of FID."

In December 2024, Sizewell C's joint managing director Nigel Cann stated "We have five investors in the process and potentially more" and are aiming to take the final investment decision in 2025.

In January 2025, it was reported that "one senior government figure and two well-placed industry sources" said the cost of the project was "likely to reach close to £40bn". In response, EDF said the £40 billion figure was "not accurate", and it was reported that "the government also said it did not recognise this sum". That month, the French state auditor advised EDF not to proceed with Sizewell C until it had reduced its exposure on Hinkley Point C. That month, The Sunday Times stated that the UK government had already committed £8 billion to the project.

On 10 June 2025, the government announced that Sizewell C had been allocated government capital investment of £14.2 billion during the 2025 spending review period (2026 to 2030). The Treasury expects 10,000 jobs to be created and enough power generated to provide electricity for six million homes. The project is still awaiting the Final Investment Decision, when the financial deal with incoming private investors for the remaining capital investment is made, and the cost of the project is disclosed. The Final Investment Decision should take place in summer 2025.

On 22 July 2025, the government signed the final investment decision. The UK government confirmed it would be taking an initial stake of 44.9% in the project, with the remainder consisting of La Caisse (20%), Centrica (15%), EDF (12.5%), and Amber Infrastructure (7.6%). There is also a proposed £5 billion debt guarantee from Bpifrance Assurance Export, to back commercial bank loans. The National Wealth Fund is to support the majority of the project's debt finance, alongside Bpifrance.

The equity and debt finance raised will exceed the construction cost to manage potential overruns. The government claims suppliers are incentivised to reduce costs and investors would lose potential revenue in case of overruns, reducing risk for taxpayers. The government is using a Regulated Asset Base funding model, introduced in the Nuclear Energy (Financing) Act 2022. With an estimated construction cost of £38 billion (representing a 20% saving over Hinkley Point C), this model means that monthly consumer bills increase by £1 already in the ten years of construction time, when no electricity is yet generated. The power station is projected to save the electricity system £2 billion a year, once operational. In November 2025, the financing deal was agreed.

== Criticism and opposition ==
=== Opposition groups ===
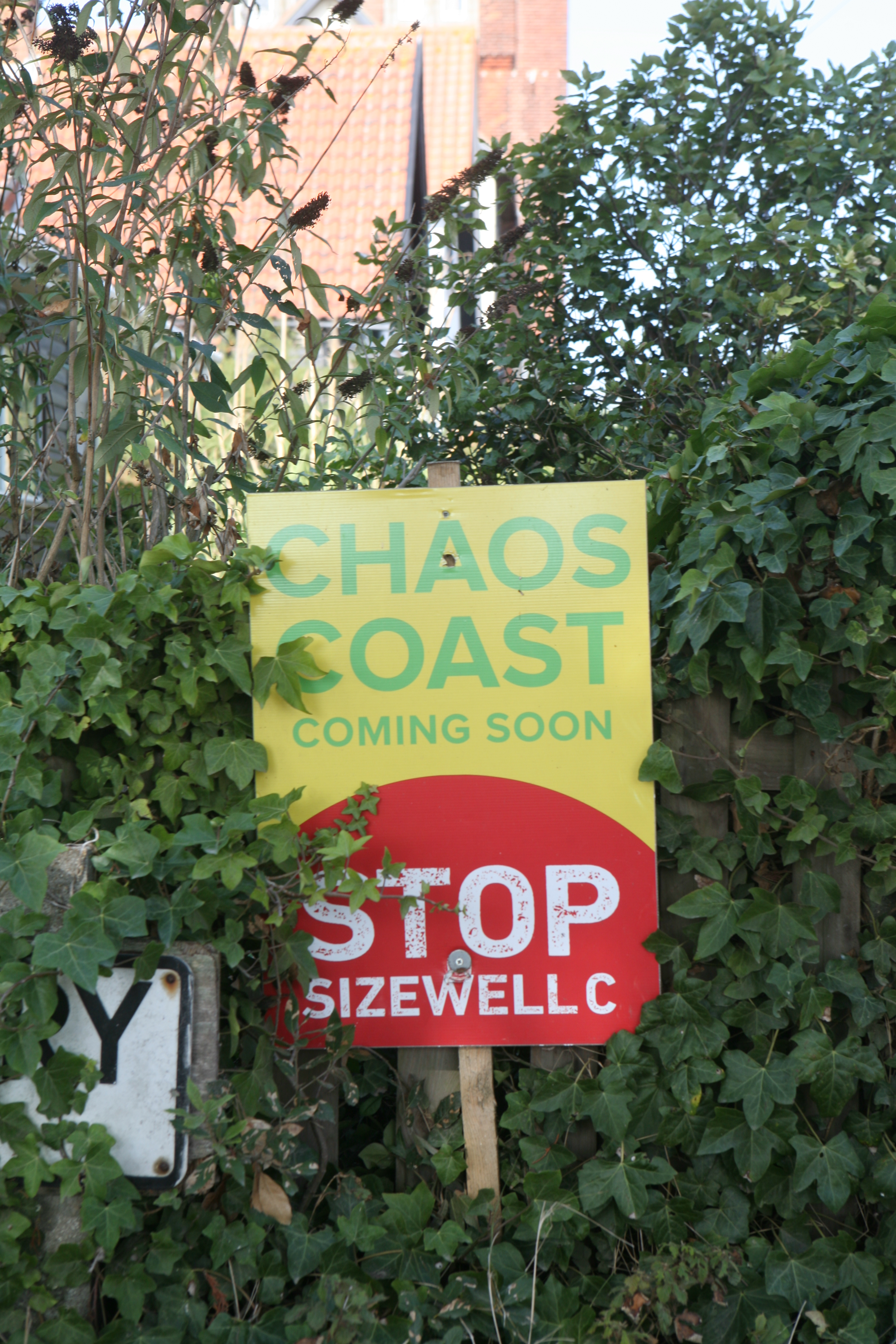
A Stop Sizewell C protest sign, on a Suffolk roadside

Groups that opposed the construction of the plant include Together Against Sizewell C (TASC) and Stop Sizewell C.

TASC sought a judicial review of the East Suffolk Council's decision to grant planning permission in September 2019 for preparatory works on the site, which would involve the felling of 229 trees as well as the demolition of buildings on the Sizewell B site. The group claimed that the decision was unlawful and that proper investigations into the potential scale of environmental damage had not occurred. The bid to block the works was brought to the High Court on behalf of TASC by a local resident and former Labour Suffolk county councillor, Joan Girling. The court heard the case on 8 September 2020, and ruled that the habitat loss would be "minor" and "not significant". Mr Justice Holgate rejected the attempt to block the works, and said that he "did not accept East Suffolk Council acted irrationally".

An EDF spokesperson responded to the rulings by saying that "The judge acknowledged the robust nature of the report provided by East Suffolk Council regarding the environmental impact of the work. The report, which was informed by the council arboriculturist, found that the majority (73%) of the 229 trees that need to be removed from Coronation Wood are low quality plantation wood with a limited life expectancy and limited amenity value. It was judged that this loss would be 'balanced' by the planting of over 2,500 juvenile woodland trees, including a mixture of broadleaf and coniferous species appropriate for the prevailing soil and coastal conditions."

On 6 October 2020, TASC and the Stop Sizewell C group delivered a petition with over 10,400 signatures to Downing Street, the Treasury and the Department of Business, Energy and Industrial Strategy, calling for the government to stop Sizewell C as the plans would be costly, risky and would not positively contribute to net zero until 2040.

Stop Sizewell C is the campaign name of Theberton and Eastbridge Action Group on Sizewell (TEAGS). TEAGS was formed in 2013 by representatives of the Suffolk parish of Theberton and Eastbridge, which neighbours the proposed Sizewell C construction site, in order to give a voice to the community. TEAGS did not initially oppose Sizewell C, but after eight years of engagement with EDF and other stakeholders, the group changed its name to Stop Sizewell C.

In December 2023, the Court of Appeal ruled that the Government's decision to approve the site was lawful, following a challenge from TASC which argued that the site would cause 'irreparable damage' to the Suffolk coast.

In May 2024, after an appeal by TASC, the Supreme Court refused to review the Court of Appeal decision as "the application does not raise an arguable point of law". In December 2024 the High Court ruled that the challenge filed by TEAGS/Stop Sizewell C had "no chance of success" and was "totally without merit".

=== Concerns regarding Chinese involvement ===
Concerns have been expressed regarding one of the shareholders in the consortium, China General Nuclear Power Group (known as CGN), which is owned by the Chinese government and has been blacklisted by the United States Department of Commerce for attempting to acquire advanced U.S. nuclear technology and material for diversion to military use. In September 2020, following Hitachi's decision to withdraw from the Wylfa and Oldbury projects, the BBC reported that the UK government was looking to replace CGN as an investor and might take a stake in Sizewell C.

In 2022, UK Government announced a buy-out to allow for the exit of CGN from the project.

=== Concerns regarding water consumption ===
Some environmental campaigners and Sizewell critics have questioned if it will be possible to meet the plant's need for potable water without adversely impacting the supplies available to surrounding areas. Figures released in early 2010 by the Sizewell A and B operators—Magnox Ltd and EDF, respectively—indicated that the two existing plants were consuming approximately 920 cubic metres (200,000 imp gal) of mains water each day, in addition to the 5,000,000 cubic metres (180,000,000 cu ft) of seawater that the operators are permitted to use for cooling systems that do not require treated water. Critics estimated that Sizewell C would require a further 1,600 cubic metres (350,000 imp gal) of potable water daily, and suggested that EDF were planning to use the mains supply because it would be cheaper than the alternative of establishing a desalination plant. Essex and Suffolk Water, the mains-water supplier for the area, stated in response that they were satisfied that the water supply would be "sustainable" for the next 25 years even if Sizewell C were to be built.

However, Essex and Suffolk Water later reversed its position, leading EDF to plan instead on using a temporary desalination plant to provide for construction water needs while also building a permanent 29-kilometre-long (18 mi) pipeline from the River Waveney to the Sizewell C site – but this plan was also halted when in August 2021 Essex and Suffolk Water informed EDF that the Environment Agency would be curtailing their licences to abstract water from the River Waveney by up to 60%. The water company subsequently confirmed that "existing water resources (including the River Waveney) will not be sufficient to meet forecast mains water demand, including the operational demand of Sizewell C," leading EDF to declare that it would rely on a permanent desalination system supplying the plant's needs if no other solution could be found. This was accepted by the Secretary of State for Business, Energy and Industrial Strategy, Kwasi Kwarteng, who held that "the uncertainty over the permanent water supply strategy is not a barrier to granting consent" to the Sizewell C project.

On 8 August 2022, Together Against Sizewell C (TASC), supported by Friends of the Earth, announced its intention to contest the development consent order, based primarily on the failure to first secure a water supply. In its earlier rejection of the scheme, the Planning Inspectorate had stated that "unless the outstanding water supply strategy can be resolved and sufficient information provided to enable the secretary of state to carry out his obligations under the Habitats Regulations, the case for an order granting development consent for the application is not made out". In a ruling on 20 December 2023 the case was dismissed; "the Secretary of State was entitled in this case to regard the project as the power station, and that the provision of a permanent water supply was not part of that project but formed a different and separate project." The TASC appeal to this ruling was dismissed on 13 May 2024 "because the application does not raise an arguable point of law".

=== Concerns regarding coastal erosion ===
There are also concerns about coastal erosion near Sizewell, particularly following accelerated erosion at nearby Thorpeness since December 2024. David King, former chief scientific adviser to the UK government, highlighted that erosion in this area will amplify the impacts of rising sea levels. Local residents accused the Sizewell developers of dredging 210,000 tonnes of gravel from the beach at Thorpeness to protect the plant; however this was refuted by a Sizewell C spokesperson. Protecting the plant from the sea is a key concern. There are plans to construct 14 m (46 ft) high defences using boulders.

=== Preference for other energy sources ===
Researchers such as Professor Barrett et al at UCL claim, based on detailed cost studies, that a judicious mix of renewable energy, storage, hydrogen, and fossil fuel offers the same constant availability of power as Sizewell C, at lower cost.

=== Economic impacts on the local area ===
Aldeburgh Town Council expressed concern about workers being attracted to jobs at the Sizewell C site. "Aldeburgh is a town with an economy firmly rooted in Tourism. ... Businesses simply cannot match the offers being made by SZC and have already lost staff to higher paid opportunities – this was also experienced during the construction of Sizewell B."

== Archaeology ==
In January 2025 it was reported that a hoard of coins from the 11th century had been found at the site. Oxford Cotswold Archaeology had discovered a cloth and lead package containing 321 silver coins, in mint condition, and believed the bundle could have been the savings of a local figure, fearing regime changes following the accession of Edward the Confessor in 1042. The coins date between 1036 and 1044, during the reigns of the Saxon kings Harold I, Harthacnut and Edward the Confessor. The discovery was featured in a January 2025 episode of Digging for Britain (series 12, episode 1).

In January 2026, archaeologists announced the uncovering of an Anglo-Saxon burial ground during preparatory excavations. The site, dating from the 6th to 7th centuries, includes at least 11 burial mounds (barrows) with both inhumation and cremation burials, many accompanied by weapons, jewellery and vessels, indicating varied funerary practices. Among the most remarkable finds is a high-status burial containing two individuals interred with a fully harnessed horse, weapons and personal items, interpreted as reflecting élite social status.

In April 2026, archaeological investigations conducted ahead of construction at the Sizewell C site have revealed evidence of a Roman industrial landscape, including a well-preserved pottery kiln and features associated with salt production. The remains form part of a broader, multi-period archaeological sequence uncovered across the area, demonstrating long-term occupation and economic activity along the Suffolk coast. The industrial features suggest organised production linked to coastal resources, with salt-making and ceramic production likely forming part of a wider regional economy during the Roman period.

== See also ==
- Nuclear power in the United Kingdom
- Energy policy of the United Kingdom
- Energy in the United Kingdom
- List of commercial nuclear reactors#United Kingdom
- Proposed nuclear power stations in the United Kingdom
- Hinkley Point C nuclear power station
