= Nuclear power in the United Kingdom =

- Nuclear power plants in United Kingdom (view)
- Active plants
- Closed plants
- Under construction
- Planned plants

Nuclear power in the United Kingdom generated 16.1% of the country's electricity in 2020. As of December 2025, the UK has nine operational nuclear reactors at four locations (eight advanced gas-cooled reactors (AGR) and one pressurised water reactor (PWR)), producing 5.9 GWe. It also has nuclear reprocessing plants at Sellafield and the Tails Management Facility (TMF) operated by Urenco in Capenhurst.

The United Kingdom established the world's first civil nuclear programme, opening a nuclear power station, Calder Hall at Windscale, England, in 1956. The British installed base of nuclear reactors used to be dominated by domestically developed Magnox and their successor AGR reactors with graphite moderator and CO_{2} coolant but the last of those are nearing the end of their useful life and will be replaced with "international" PWR designs. At the peak in 1997, 26% of the nation's electricity was generated from nuclear power. Since then several reactors have closed and by 2012 the share had declined to 19%. The older AGR reactors have been life-extended, but they are now towards the end of their life.

In October 2010, the Cameron–Clegg coalition took forward the previous Labour government's plans for private suppliers to construct up to eight new nuclear power plants. The Scottish Government, with the backing of the Scottish Parliament, has stated that no new nuclear power stations will be constructed in Scotland. E.ON UK, RWE npower and Horizon Nuclear Power have been pulling out of their initial plans for developing new nuclear power plants, placing the future of nuclear power in the UK in some doubt. Despite this, EDF Energy is still planning to build four new reactors at two sites, with construction ongoing at Hinkley Point in Somerset. In light of the 2022 Russian invasion of Ukraine, the government of Boris Johnson announced a renewed commitment to nuclear power in order to increase energy independence, as Britain has long relied on imported Russian oil. The EPR and potentially other PWR designs would be used, as well as yet-to-be-developed small modular reactors, in a push towards and decarbonisation while replacing the ageing AGR reactors and phasing out gas and coal for electricity generation. While there is a de facto nuclear power phaseout underway in Scotland and there are plans to replace existing reactors with newly built ones in England and Wales (sometimes using existing sites for the new reactors), no nuclear power plant has ever been built in Northern Ireland.

EDF Energy owns and manages the five currently operating and three de-fuelling reactor sites. Four new plants are proposed to be built in the next few decades. All nuclear installations in the UK are overseen by the Office for Nuclear Regulation. In 2025, nuclear power produced 11% of the country’s electricity.

== History ==
=== 20th century ===
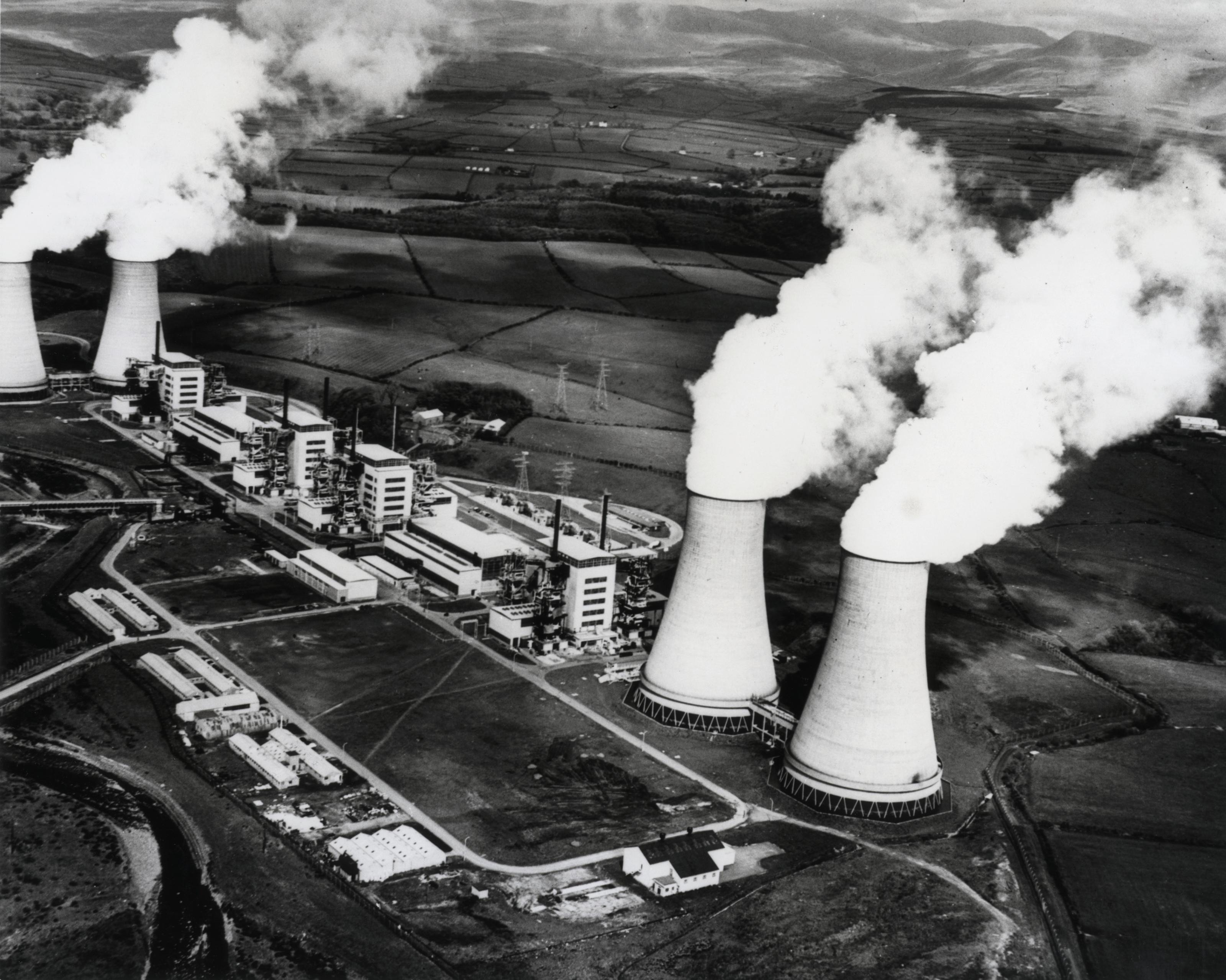
Calder Hall power station was first connected to the national power grid on 27 August 1956.

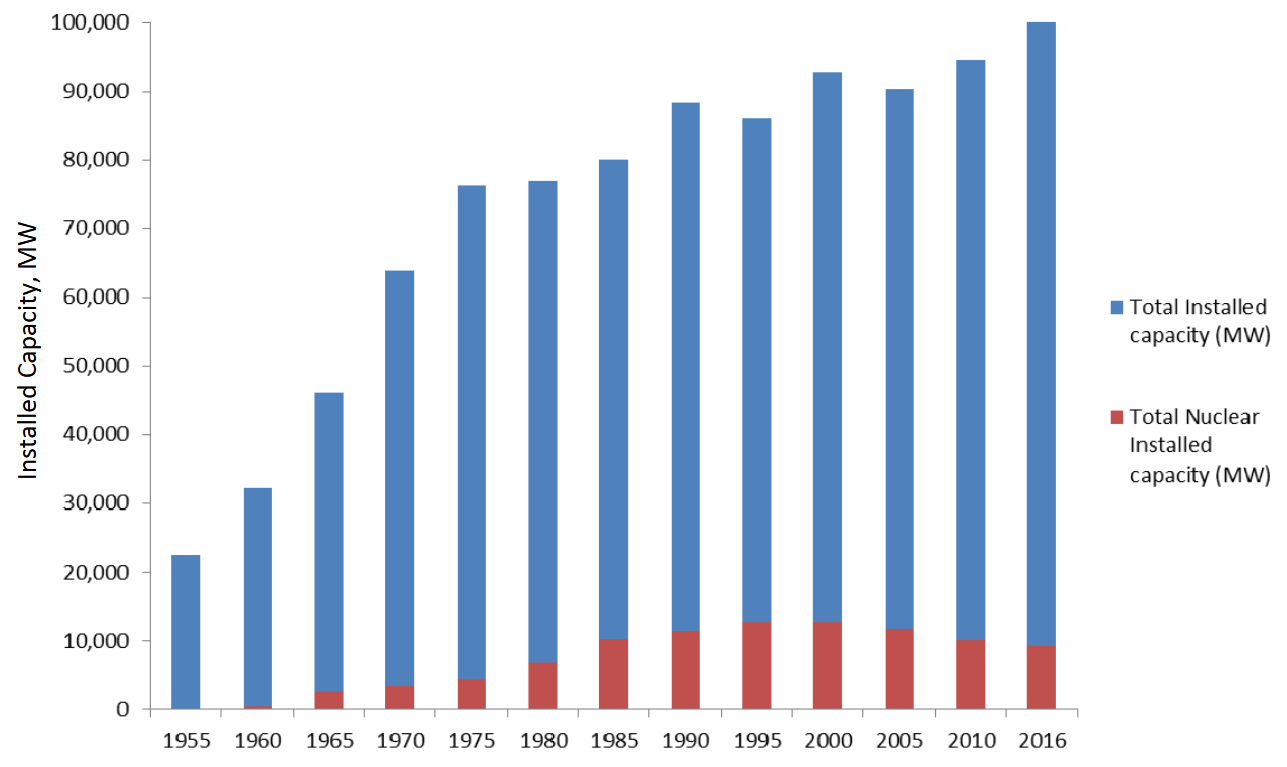
Nuclear capacity (red) as a proportion of total generating capacity, 1955–2016

The United Kingdom Atomic Energy Authority (UKAEA) was established in 1954 as a statutory corporation to oversee and pioneer the development of nuclear energy within the United Kingdom.

The first station to be connected to the grid, on 27 August 1956, was Calder Hall, although the production of weapons-grade plutonium was the main reason behind this power station. Calder Hall was the world's first nuclear power station to deliver electricity in commercial quantities (although the world’s first nuclear power plant, with a capacity of 5 MW at Obninsk in the Soviet Union was connected to the public supply in 1954).

In February 1966, it was announced that the first prototype fast breeder reactor in the United Kingdom would be constructed in Dounreay, Scotland, at a cost of £30 million.

British Nuclear Fuels Limited (BNFL) was established in February 1971 from the demerger of the production division of the UK Atomic Energy Authority (UKAEA). In 1984 BNFL became a public limited company, British Nuclear Fuels plc, wholly owned by the UK government.

In December 1979, in the wake of the industrial disputes of the Winter of Discontent and the 1979 oil crisis, the new Thatcher government announced a new long-term nuclear power programme. The existing state National Nuclear Corporation would complete its existing planned second generation AGR builds, and would develop a new programme of building one Westinghouse designed pressurised water reactor (PWR) per year for at least a decade from 1982 (about 15 GWe in total). However, in 1981 the Select Committee on Energy and the Monopolies and Mergers Commission produced reports criticising the CEGB and government's demand forecasting and investment assessment justifying the programme. From 1982, after Nigel Lawson replaced David Howell as Secretary of State for Energy, the government began rowing back from this large proposal, in part because the government were beginning to consider privatising the electricity industry. The Electricity Act 1989 provided for the privatisation of the electricity industry, introducing the Fossil Fuel Levy to support the nuclear power industry which was exempted from privatisation and vested in Nuclear Electric.

In the end, only the Sizewell B nuclear power plant from the PWR programme was built, between 1987 and 1995. It began producing power for the national grid in February 1995. Its construction followed a four-year, 16 million-word public inquiry. As of 2019, it is the most recent nuclear plant to be constructed in the United Kingdom. Sizewell B was intended to be the first of a smaller series of four new identical power stations, but the rest were dropped as uneconomic in the early 1990s when it was decided to privatise the electric power industry so low interest rate government finance would no longer be available.

A Thermal Oxide Reprocessing Plant (THORP) was opened at Sellafield in 1994. Construction had begun in the 1970s and cost £2.4 billion.

In 1996, the UK's eight most advanced nuclear plants, seven AGR and one PWR, were privatised as British Energy, raising £2.1 billion. The remaining Magnox reactors remained in public ownership as Magnox Electric. On 30 January 1998, Magnox Electric was merged into BNFL as BNFL Magnox Generation.

=== 21st century ===
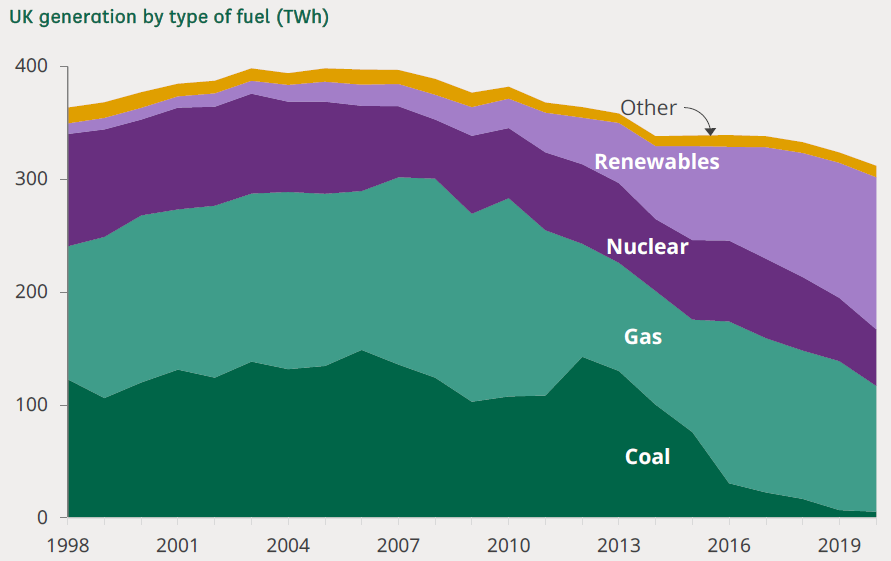
Electricity generation by type of fuel, 1998–2020

==== The 2000s and 2010s: deciding on expansion and financing difficulty ====
===== 2002 energy review =====
Margaret Beckett as Secretary of State for Environment, Food and Rural Affairs rejected demands for an expansion of nuclear power from a lobby including energy minister Brian Wilson and Downing Street staff. She argued there was no need for new nuclear for at least 15 years given current energy prices and generation capacity.

In relation to nuclear power, the conclusion of the Government's 2002 energy review was that:

The immediate priorities of energy policy are likely to be most cost-effectively served by promoting energy efficiency and expanding the role of renewables. However, the options of new investment in nuclear power and in clean coal (through carbon sequestration) need to be kept open, and practical measures taken to do this.

The practical measures identified were: continuing to participate in international research; ensuring that the nuclear skill-base is maintained, and that the regulators are adequately staffed to assess any new investment proposals; shortening the lead-time to commissioning, should new nuclear power be chosen in future; permitting nuclear power to benefit from the development of carbon taxes and similar market mechanisms; and addressing the problems of long-term nuclear waste disposal. It went on to state that "Because nuclear is a mature technology within a well-established global industry, there is no current case for further government support" and that "the decision whether to bring forward proposals for new nuclear build is a matter for the private sector".

===== 2003 Energy White Paper =====
The Government's Energy White Paper, published in 2003 and titled "Our Energy Future – Creating a Low Carbon Economy" concluded that:

Nuclear power is currently an important source of carbon-free electricity. However, its current economics make it an unattractive option for new, carbon-free generating capacity and there are also important issues of nuclear waste to be resolved. These issues include our legacy waste and continued waste arising from other sources. This white paper does not contain specific proposals for building new nuclear power stations. However we do not rule out the possibility that at some point in the future new nuclear build might be necessary if we are to meet our carbon targets.

===== 2006 energy review =====
In April 2005, advisers to Prime Minister Tony Blair were suggesting that constructing new nuclear power stations would be the best way to meet the country's targets on reducing emissions of gases responsible for global warming. The energy policy of the United Kingdom has a near-term target of cutting emissions below 1997 levels by 20%, and a more ambitious target of an 80% cut by 2050. In November 2005, the Government announced an energy review, subsequently launched in January 2006, to "review the UK's progress against the medium and long-term Energy White Paper goals and the options for further steps to achieve them".

Following the 2006 review the Office for Nuclear Regulation, an agency of Health and Safety Executive, developed the Generic Design Assessment process (GDA) to assess new nuclear reactor designs ahead of site-specific proposals. The GDA started assessing four designs: Westinghouse AP1000; Areva EPR; AECL ACR-1000; and GE-Hitachi ESBWR. However the ACR-1000 and ESBWR were subsequently withdrawn from the assessment for commercial reasons, leaving the EPR and AP1000 as contenders for new nuclear builds.

===== 2007 High Court ruling =====
On 15 February 2007, environmental group Greenpeace won a High Court ruling that threw out the government's 2006 Energy Review. Justice Sullivan presiding held that the government's review was "seriously flawed", in particular in that key details of the economics of the argument were only published after the review was completed. Justice Sullivan held that the review's wording on nuclear waste disposal was "not merely inadequate but also misleading", and held the decision to proceed to be "unlawful".

Responding to the news, Trade and Industry Secretary Alistair Darling said that there would be a fresh consultation, but that a decision was required before the end of 2007. He stated that the government remains convinced that new nuclear power plants are needed to help combat climate change and over-reliance on imported oil and gas. Attention was drawn in the media to numerous connections to nuclear industry lobbyists within the Labour Party.

===== 2007 consultation =====
The 2007 Energy White Paper: Meeting the Energy Challenge was published on 23 May 2007. It contained a "preliminary view ... that it is in the public interest to give the private sector the option of investing in new nuclear power stations". Alongside the White Paper the Government published a consultation document, The Future of Nuclear Power, together with a number of supporting documents. One of these, a report by Jackson Consulting, suggested that it would be preferable to site new power stations on existing nuclear power stations sites that are owned by the Nuclear Decommissioning Authority or British Energy. Greenpeace responded to the release of the consultation document by repeating its position that replacing the nuclear fleet rather than decommissioning would only reduce the UK's total carbon emissions by four per cent.

On 7 September 2007, several anti-nuclear groups, including Greenpeace, Friends of the Earth, CND, and the WWF, announced that they had pulled out of the consultation process. They stated that it appeared as if the Government had already made up its mind regarding the future of nuclear power. The business and enterprise secretary, John Hutton, responded in a Radio 4 interview "It is not the government that has got a closed view on these issues, I think it is organisations like Greenpeace that have got a closed mind. There is only one outcome that Greenpeace and other organisations want from this consultation."

===== 2008 go-ahead given =====
In January 2008, the UK government gave the go-ahead for a new generation of nuclear power stations to be built. The Scottish Government has made clear that it opposes new nuclear power stations being built in Scotland and has the final say on planning matters in Scotland. Liberal Democrat spokesman Steve Webb MP said on 29 January 2008 "There is a real risk that focusing on new nuclear plants will undermine attempts to find a cleaner, greener, more sustainable and secure solution. We should be concentrating our efforts on renewables and greater energy conservation." On 10 January 2008, Alan Duncan MP issued a response to the Government's announcement on nuclear power, welcoming it and suggesting that the Conservatives supported a level economic playing field for different types of energy generation rather than a preference for one over another.

Two consortia (EDF-Centrica and RWE-E.ON) had announced outline plans to build a total of 12.5 GW of new nuclear capacity, slightly more than the total capacity of British Energy's currently operating plants.

In 2009, government officials believed a carbon price floor would be needed to encourage companies to commit funds to nuclear build projects.

===== 2009 to 2011 =====
Hinkley Point

In 2009, Électricité de France (EDF), the state-owned French energy company, took over British Energy, paying £12.5 billion. In August 2009, the energy company Centrica purchased a 20% share from EDF. A subsidiary of EDF was formed called EDF Energy.

In November 2009, the Government identified ten nuclear sites which could accommodate future reactors: Bradwell in Essex; Braystones in Cumbria; Kirksanton in Cumbria; Sellafield in Cumbria; Hartlepool in County Durham; Heysham in Lancashire; Hinkley Point in Somerset; Oldbury in Gloucestershire; Sizewell in Suffolk; and Wylfa in North Wales. Most of these sites already have a nuclear power station; the only new sites are Braystones and Kirksanton.

In October 2010, sites at Braystones, Kirksanton and Dungeness were ruled out by Secretary of State for Energy and Climate Change Chris Huhne with the former government's list of eleven potential sites reduced to eight.

In 2010, the Nuclear Advanced Manufacturing Research Centre was created in Rotherham, South Yorkshire, led by the University of Sheffield with Rolls-Royce, anticipating involvement in any forthcoming new nuclear builds in the UK. It was funded with £15 million from the Department for Business, Innovation and Skills and £10 million from the regional development agency Yorkshire Forward.

===== 2011 to 2016 =====
Following the 2011 Fukushima I nuclear accidents, Chris Huhne, Secretary of State for Energy and Climate Change, wrote to Dr Mike Weightman, head of the HSE's Nuclear Directorate, on 12 March, asking for a report "on the implications of the situation and the lessons to be learned for the UK nuclear industry". The report was to be delivered within six months, with an interim report by mid-May, "prepared in close cooperation with the International nuclear community and other nuclear safety regulators". On 15 March, Huhne expressed regret that some European politicians were "rushing to judgement" before assessments had been carried out, and said that it was too early to determine whether the willingness of the private sector to invest in new nuclear plants would be affected. In the wake of the accident the Government was criticised for having colluded with EDF Energy, Areva and Westinghouse in order to manage communications and maintain public support for nuclear power.

In January 2012, the campaign group Energy Fair, supported by a number of other organisations and environmentalists, filed a formal complaint with the European Commission over alleged unlawful State aid in the form of subsidies for nuclear power industry, in breach of European Union competition law. It claims that the subsidies arise from underwriting commercial risk and decommissioning costs, protection against terrorist attacks, the disposal of nuclear waste, and by providing "institutional support" in the form of various government funded or subsidised bodies such as the National Nuclear Laboratory, the Nuclear Institute, and Nuclear Decommissioning Authority without providing corresponding levels of support for renewable technologies, without which nuclear power would not be commercially viable, so distorting the energy market. The group claims that the subsidies divert resources from renewable technologies that would "cut emissions more deeply, more quickly, more cheaply, and with none of the risks and other problems with nuclear power".

In March 2012, two of the big six power companies announced they would be pulling out of developing new nuclear power plants. The decision by RWE npower and E.ON followed uncertainty over nuclear energy following the Fukushima nuclear disaster, which had occurred the year before. Their decision followed a similar announcement by Scottish and Southern Electricity the previous year. Hitachi purchased the Horizon joint-venture, intending to build two or three 1,350 MWe Advanced boiling water reactors (ABWR) at Oldbury and Wylfa.

French-owned EDF, one of the two remaining consortia planning to build new nuclear plants in the UK, has indicated that the election victory of François Hollande will not change its plans in the UK, despite François Hollande having proposed to cut France's reliance on nuclear power generation from 75% to 50%, and despite speculation to the contrary in the UK.

In 2012, Russian firm Rosatom stated that in the future it intended to certify the VVER-1200 with the British and U.S. regulatory authorities, though was unlikely to apply for a British licence before 2015, after having seen what agreements EDF finally reaches. In September 2013, Rosatom, in conjunction with Fortum and Rolls-Royce, signed a Memorandum of Understanding with the UK government to prepare for a VVER Generic Design Assessment.

In 2013, Tim Yeo, chairman of the Commons Energy and Climate Change Committee, stated that the government reaching an agreement over nuclear power expansion was a "matter of great urgency", and warned that Britain could run out of energy if negotiations were not concluded quickly.

In the same year, a cross-party committee inquiry concluded that the UK "will not be able to meet its climate change targets without new nuclear build". A report published by the committee found that unless planned nuclear power plants are built on time, it will be "extremely challenging, if not impossible" for the country to meet its legally binding carbon reduction targets. Such a failure to build the new nuclear capacity by 2025 would also force a greater reliance on imported gas, and would affect energy security.

On 26 March 2013, the government published a Nuclear Industrial Strategy which in part stated that the nuclear industry had plans for about 16 GWe of new nuclear power stations by 2030, which is at least 12 new nuclear reactors at five sites. A Nuclear Industry Council will be established, and a Nuclear Innovation and Research Advisory Board will be created "to ensure that public R&D programmes are aligned to support industrial and energy policy". Public civil nuclear R&D funding for 2010–2011 was £66 million, which is low compared to some international competitors. The government will join the European Jules Horowitz Reactor research project.

In April 2013, EDF's negotiations with the government over the strike price for nuclear produced electricity stalled. EDF's chief executive stated EDF was "in no hurry" to agree the strike price, and was unconcerned if the negotiations failed. Commentators believed it would take several months to reach a conclusion.

The Office for National Statistics assessed that in 2015 the UK nuclear industry directly employed about 12,400 staff, though about 9,400 of those worked at Sellafield mostly on nuclear waste handling.

EDF's attribution of cost elements in Hinkley Point C electricity price
Element	£/MWh	Per cent of price
Construction risk premium	35	38%
Other financing costs	26	29%
Operation & maintenance costs	19.5	21%
Capital cost	11	12%
Total electricity price	92.5	

In 2016, EDF and the UK government finalised the £92.50/MWh contract for difference (linked to inflation since 2012 – £128/MWh in 2022) for the building of two EPR reactors at Hinkley Point C.

==== The 2020s: possible financing solution and SMR revolution ====
===== Regulated Asset Base financing model =====
Following the abandonment of three large new nuclear developments at Moorside in 2018, and Wylfa Newydd and Oldbury B in 2020, primarily because the developers were unable to attract finance for the developments, the Nuclear Energy (Financing) Bill was introduced in the House of Commons in October 2021. It enabled the Regulated Asset Base (RAB) financing model to be used for new nuclear, whereby consumers finance a portion of the capital costs during the construction period rather than the developers, which will reduce the cost of loans and other financing. Consumers would not receive a financial return from their contributions, but would benefit later by having access to the electricity provided by the plant.

The Nuclear Energy (Financing) Act 2022 came into force on 31 March 2022. The power and utilities executive at Barclays bank described the RAB model as providing "a high level of certainty and confidence and predictability for investors" and "structured to produce attractive, stable, low-risk and inflation-linked returns at scale". A Government Support Package would be provided to give investors protection from specified low probability but high impact risks that the private sector would not be able to bear including the risk of cost overrun above a remote threshold, disruption to debt markets, some risks for which insurance is not available, and political risks.

===== Small modular reactor development =====
Rolls-Royce is preparing a small modular reactor (SMR) design called the Rolls-Royce SMR, a close-coupled four-loop PWR design. Power output is 470 MWe which is above the usual range considered to be a SMR. It sought UK government finance to support further development.

In December 2017, the UK government provided funding of up to £56 million over three years to support research and development into advanced and small nuclear reactors.

In 2018, the UK SMR industry sought billions of pounds of government support to finance their putative First of a Kind projects. The Expert Finance Working Group on Small Reactors produced a report stating that there was "a current market failure in supporting nuclear projects generally" and identifying options for government to support SMR development in the UK.

The UK government, through UKRI, awarded £18 million in ISCF funding to a UK-based consortium led by Rolls-Royce, with matched funding of £18 million from industry. This first phase was formally concluded on 30 June 2021 and successfully developed a concept design. In November 2021, the UK government provided £210 million, match funded by industry, in the second phase of development for the Rolls-Royce SMR.

In 2022, the UK government launched a £120 million Future Nuclear Enabling Fund to support a limited number of nuclear projects to develop design and business cases to fast-track proposals to enter a selection process in 2023. This included funding proposals for new reactor technologies to the UK such as the GE-Hitachi BWRX-300 boiling water reactor and X-energy Xe-100 high-temperature gas-cooled reactor.

In 2023, the UK government formed Great British Nuclear to oversee its policy, operating through British Nuclear Fuels Ltd in the Greater Manchester area, which includes a competitive choice of SMR suppliers for the UK. GE-Hitachi's BWRX-300 was announced in April 2023 as one of the competitors to the Rolls-Royce SMR. However, the full remit of Great British Nuclear, which was announced by the Boris Johnson government in 2022, still needs to be decided by the Rishi Sunak government including its budget and if eventually it will be a nuclear plant operator.

In July 2023, Energy Secretary Grant Shapps said he was launching an international competition to select up to four different SMR technologies "to go through to the final design stage", supported by up to £157 million of funding. He said the final investment decision will be taken by the next parliament, and UK SMRs might start operating by the 2030s. Six technologies were selected for consideration, EDF NUWARD, GE Hitachi BWRX-300, Holtec International SMR-160+, NuScale Power, Rolls-Royce SMR and the Westinghouse AP300. After the six companies have submitted their tender responses, Great British Nuclear will place between one and four co-funding contracts later in 2024 to support the development and regulatory approval process, to prepare bids for a final investment decision in 2029. The cancellation for cost reasons in November 2023 of the first commercial SMR deployment in the U.S., using NuScale SMRs, has however cast doubt over whether SMRs in the UK would be economic.

In January 2024, GE-Hitachi was awarded a grant of £33.6 million from the UK Government's Future Nuclear Enabling Fund. This grant was provided to support the company's plans to undergo the GDA process for its BWRX-300 SMR, which has a capacity of 300 MWe.

In February 2025, four vendors were invited by the UK government to submit final tenders for their designs: GE Hitachi BWRX-300, Holtec SMR-300, Rolls-Royce SMR and Westinghouse AP300. All these are based on existing technologies, with the BWRX-300 and AP300 being scaled down versions of existing large designs. A final investment decision is expected in 2029.

===== Brexit negotiations to 2021 =====
On 26 January 2017, the UK notified the European Atomic Energy Community (Euratom) of its intention to withdraw, following on from its decision to withdraw from the European Union. Leaving will have wide-ranging implications for Britain's nuclear industry, including regulation and research, access to nuclear materials and impacts about twenty nuclear co-operation agreements with non-EU countries. The UK withdrawal might raise the question of nuclear fuel availability after 2019 in the UK, and the need for the UK to enter into new treaties relating to the transportation of nuclear materials.

In 2018, the National College for Nuclear opened two hubs at Bridgwater and Taunton College and Lakes College largely funded by £22.5 million from the Department for Education, intended to service the building and operation of new build nuclear power plants. In November 2018, the UK ratified the Generation IV International Forum (GIF) framework international collaboration agreement for research and development of Generation IV nuclear reactors.

In 2019, Wood sold its nuclear business, mostly decommissioning work at Sellafield, for £250 million to the US Jacobs Engineering Group, which has a global nuclear business.

In 2020, Energy Systems Catapult analysis suggested new 10 GW nuclear power in order to achieve net zero emissions by 2050. In June 2020, Zion Lights, former spokesperson of Extinction Rebellion UK, declared her support for nuclear energy as a critical part of the energy mix along with renewable energy sources and called fellow environmentalists to accept that nuclear power is part of the "scientifically assessed solutions for addressing climate change".

On 31 January 2020, the UK formally withdrew from the European Union (EU) and the European Atomic Energy Community (Euratom) following a national referendum and parliamentary approval. In response, the UK secured new nuclear cooperation agreements with Australia, the United States, Canada, and the International Atomic Energy Agency (IAEA). Additionally, the UK entered into a nuclear cooperation agreement with the EU in December 2020, effective from 1 January 2021.

===== 2020 to present =====
The UK's November 2020 Ten Point Plan designated "new and advanced nuclear power" as a priority, with the government committing to an investment decision for at least one major nuclear power station by the end of the parliamentary term in December 2024. In February 2023, the Prime Minister's office announced the restructuring of Department for Business, Energy and Industrial Strategy (BEIS), resulting in the establishment of the Department for Energy Security and Net Zero (ESNZ) to support nuclear power expansion. By March 2023, nuclear energy had been classified as environmentally sustainable in the UK's green taxonomy, making it eligible for the same incentives as renewable energy. Additionally, the initiative 'Great British Nuclear' was set up with the goal of nuclear power contributing up to 25% of the UK's electricity by 2050.

In 2020, nuclear power generated 46 terawatt hours (TWh) of UK electricity, just over 15% of gross electricity generation, and about half its 1998 peak of 91 TWh.

In June 2021, EDF announced that Dungeness B would move into the defuelling phase with immediate effect, citing "station-specific risks within some key components, including parts within the fuel assemblies" identified since September 2018.

As of 2021, the British government's attitude to the involvement of China in British nuclear power had changed following worsening of China–United Kingdom relations, and it was exploring ways to block Chinese involvement, finance and their Bradwell B new nuclear development.

As part of the 2022 British energy security strategy policy paper, it was announced that nuclear-generating capacity would increase from 7 GW to 24 GW by 2050 and the establishment of a new nuclear development agency named Great British Nuclear. Security concerns about China also caused the government to buy China General Nuclear Power Group out of the proposed Sizewell C nuclear power station development for just over £100 million in late 2022, leaving it co-owned by EDF and the UK government.

On 7 January 2022, Hunterston B was closed and moved into defuelling earlier than planned due to cracks in the graphite bricks in the reactors.

In 2023, the civil nuclear sector in the UK employed about 77,400 people, of which 9,500 were involved with the Hinkley Point C new build. In March 2023, EDF announced that the operational life of Heysham 1 and Hartlepool power stations would be extended a further two years until March 2026.

In September 2025, the government announced the Atlantic Partnership for Advanced Nuclear Energy, which will permit fast-track new reactor design reviews by permitting the Office for Nuclear Regulation and the US Nuclear Regulatory Commission to accept parts of each other's safety assessment, eliminating duplication, aiming to reduce ONR assessment time to about two years. Also a number of prospective small modular reactor developments were announced, including 12 X-energy advanced modular reactors in Hartlepool.

== Power stations ==
=== Operating ===
Power station	Type	Net MWe	Gross MWe	Current operator	Construction started	Connected to grid	Commercial operation	Accounting closure date
Hartlepool	AGR	1185	1310	EDF Energy	1968	1983	1989	March 2030
Heysham 1	AGR	1222	1250	EDF Energy	1970	1983	1989	March 2030
Heysham 2	AGR	1230	1360	EDF Energy	1980	1988	1989	March 2030
Torness	AGR	1205	1364	EDF Energy	1980	1988	1988	March 2030
Sizewell B	PWR	1195	1250	EDF Energy	1988	1995	1995	2055

Between 2006 and 2013, Hinkley Point B and Hunterston B were restricted to about 70% of normal MWe output because of boiler-related problems requiring that they operate at reduced boiler temperatures. In 2013, these two stations' power increased to about 80% of normal output following some plant modifications.

In 2010, EDF announced a five-year life extension for both Heysham 1 and Hartlepool to enable further generation until 2024. As of 2012, EDF expected seven-year life extensions on average across all AGRs, including the recently life-extended Heysham 1 and Hartlepool. A 20-year life extension is the strategic target for the Sizewell B PWR. These life extensions are subject to detailed review and approval, and are not included in the table above. Hinkley Point B and Hunterston B were given seven-year life extensions in December 2012, from 2016 to 2023. Hartlepool had a five-year life extension in November 2013, from 2019 to 2024.

In November 2020, EDF announced that Hinkley Point B will stop generating electricity and move into the defuelling phase no later than 15 June 2022. In December 2021, EDF announced that the closure dates for Heysham 2 and Torness were to be brought forward from 2030 to March 2028. In March 2023, EDF announced that the closure dates for Heysham 1 and Hartlepool would be extended until March 2026.

In March 2024, reports highlighted that EDF Energy expects to extend the operational life of Sizewell B by 20 years, aiming for a total lifespan of 60 years, comparable to similar US PWRs. This expectation is based on the Office for Nuclear Regulation (ONR)'s approval of Sizewell B's ten-year periodic safety review (PSR) in January 2015, which allows the reactor to continue operations until the next PSR in 2025.

In December 2024, in response to concerns about energy security following further delays to Hinkley Point C, EDF announced life extension of two years for Heysham 2 and Torness, and one year for Heysham 1 and Hartlepool. EDF also stated that they hoped to extend the life of Sizewell B by 20 years to 2055.

=== Retired ===
Power station	Type	Net MWe	Construction started	Connected to grid	Commercial operation	Closure
Berkeley	Magnox	276	1957	1962	1962	1989
Hunterston A	Magnox	300	1957	1964	1964	1990
Trawsfynydd	Magnox	390	1959	1965	1965	1991
Hinkley Point A	Magnox	470	1957	1965	1965	2000
Bradwell	Magnox	246	1957	1962	1962	2002
Calder Hall	Magnox	200	1953	1956	1959	2003
Chapelcross	Magnox	240	1955	1959	1960	2004
Dungeness A	Magnox	450	1960	1965	1965	2006
Sizewell A	Magnox	420	1961	1966	1966	2006
Oldbury	Magnox	434	1962	1967	1968	2012
Wylfa	Magnox	980	1963	1971	1972	2015
Dungeness B	AGR	1040	1965	1983	1985	2021
Hunterston B	AGR	1288	1967	1976	1976	2022
Hinkley Point B	AGR	840	1967	1976	1976	2022

A number of research and development reactors also produced some power for the grid, including two Winfrith reactors, two Dounreay fast reactors, and the prototype Windscale Advanced Gas Cooled Reactor.

== Economics ==
=== History ===
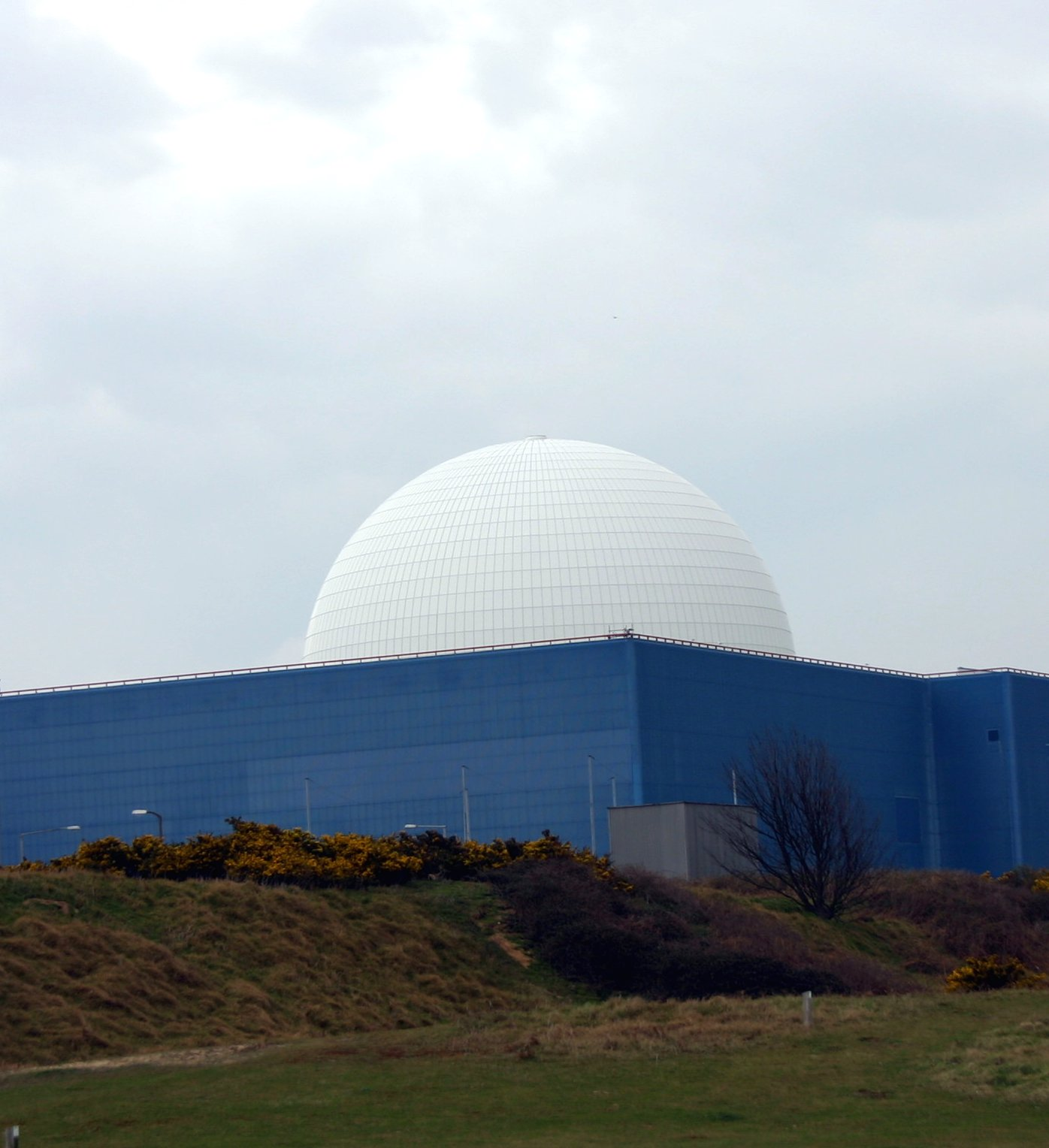
The reactor dome of the Sizewell B power station

The history of nuclear energy economics in the UK is complex. The first Magnox reactors were not built for purely commercial purposes, and later reactors faced delays which inflated costs (culminating in Sizewell B taking seven years from start of construction to entering service, after a lengthy public inquiry). Costs have also been complicated by the lack of national strategy or policy for spent nuclear fuel, so that a mixed use of reprocessing and short-term storage have been employed, with little regard for long-term considerations (although a national repository has been proposed).

There is a lack of consensus in the UK about the cost/benefit nature of nuclear energy, as well as ideological influence (for instance, those favouring 'energy security' generally arguing pro, while those worried about the 'environmental impact' against). Because of this, and a lack of a consistent energy policy in the UK since the mid-1990s, no new reactors have been built since Sizewell B in 1995. Costs have been a major influence to this, while the long lead-time between proposal and operation (at ten years or more) has put off many investors, especially with long-term considerations such as energy market regulation and nuclear waste remaining unresolved. Sizewell B was in 1995 expected to generate electricity at 3.5p/kWh (2000 prices, which is equivalent to £67/MWh in 2025), however a post-startup evaluation estimated generating cost was about 6p/kWh (2000 prices, equivalent to £114/MWh in 2025), excluding first-of-kind costs and using an 8% discount rate for the cost of capital.

=== Future power stations ===
From 2010 until 2015, it was UK Government policy that the construction of any new nuclear power stations in the UK would be led and financed by the private sector. This transfers the running and immediate concerns to the operator, while reducing (although not eliminating) government participation and long-term involvement/liability (nuclear waste, as involving government policy, will likely remain a liability, even if only a limited one). In 2010, The Daily Telegraph reported that additional incentives, such as capacity payments and supplier nuclear obligations, would be needed to persuade companies to build nuclear plants in the UK. The government decided to subsidise nuclear power again in 2015.

When the rest of the UK generating industry was privatised, the Government introduced the Non-Fossil Fuel Obligation, initially as a means of supporting the nuclear generators, which remained under state ownership until the formation of British Energy. British Energy, the private sector company that operated the UK's more modern nuclear plants, came close to bankruptcy and in 2004 was restructured with UK government investment of over £3 billion, although this has since been paid back in full. In January 2009, British Energy was bought for approximately £12 billion by EDF Energy (a subsidiary of Électricité de France (EDF)) and Centrica (a major operator of CCGT power stations and renewable sources in the UK and parent company of British Gas) in an 80/20 split.

In January 2008, the UK government indicated that it would take steps to encourage private operators to build new nuclear power plants in the following years to meet projected energy needs. The government stated that there would be no subsidies for nuclear power. The Government hoped that the first station would be operational before 2020. However, the Welsh Government remains opposed to new nuclear plants in Wales despite the approval of Wylfa as a potential site. Scotland has decided against new nuclear power stations.

In May 2008, The Times reported that Wulf Bernotat, chairman and chief executive of E.ON, had stated that the cost of each new nuclear power plant in the UK could be as high as €6 billion (£4.8 billion), much higher than the Government's estimate of £2.8 billion. The cost of replacing Britain's ten nuclear power stations could therefore reach £48 billion, excluding the cost of decommissioning ageing reactors or dealing with nuclear waste.

On 29 March 2012, E.ON and RWE npower, which had formed the joint venture Horizon to build NPPs in the United Kingdom, announced that they would not develop new nuclear power projects in the UK, focusing instead on shorter term investments, and were looking to find another company to take over Horizon. On 29 October 2012 it was announced that Hitachi would buy Horizon for about £700 million. Hitachi intend to build two or three 1,350 MWe advanced boiling water reactors (ABWR) at Oldbury and Wylfa, but will first require a Generic Design Assessment for the ABWR design by the Office for Nuclear Regulation, which will take about four years.

In June 2012, in research commissioned by EDF, the Institute for Public Policy Research suggested that building 18 GW of new nuclear energy capacity in the UK, with more than ten new reactors, could create between 16,250 and 21,250 additional jobs, and enable the UK to compete in the international market for nuclear energy. The Institute of Directors also published a report stating that nuclear energy is a "clean, cheap and safe" way of generating electricity, with 84% of its members in favour of new nuclear power in Britain. However, The Times reported the cost of building each EPR had increased to £7 billion, which Citigroup analysts did not regard as commercially viable, projecting a generation cost of 16.6p/kWh for private-sector financed reactors.

On 21 October 2013, EDF Energy announced that an agreement had been reached regarding new nuclear plants to be built on the site of Hinkley Point C. EDF Group and the UK Government agreed on the key commercial terms of the investment contract. The final investment decision was still conditional on completion of the remaining key steps, including the agreement of the EU Commission.

In 2015, the UK government proposed to provide large subsidies to the Hinkley Point C plant, paying twice the market rate for electricity.

A 2015 model-based study compared renewables plus storage, nuclear, and fossil fuels with and without carbon capture and storage. The study found that, for the scenarios considered, costs were similar at about 0.084 /kWh at up to 50% renewables and rose for renewables above an 80% share as grid-scale storage, imports, and tidal range generation were applied.

Rolls-Royce is preparing a small modular reactor (SMR) design called the Rolls-Royce SMR, a close-coupled four-loop PWR design. Power output is 440 MWe which is above the usual range considered to be a SMR. As of 2017, Rolls-Royce was seeking UK government finance to support further development. In 2018, the UK government announced £56 million of spending to fund initial SMR research and development for eight companies.

In 2017, a consensus of government and industry developed that the Contract for Difference financing model used for Hinkley Point C, involving fully private sector financing, may not used for subsequent nuclear plants, and discussions with government are under way about alternative finance mechanisms for the following possible development at Wylfa Newydd by Horizon Nuclear Power for parent Hitachi. However, on 17 January 2019, Horizon announced that it was suspending its UK nuclear development programme. The UK government had been willing to take a one-third equity stake in the project, to consider providing all the required debt financing, and to provide a Contract for Difference for the electricity generated at up to £75/MWh for 35 years. Greg Clark, minister for Business, Energy and Industrial Strategy, stated this was a "generous package of potential support that goes beyond what any government has been willing to consider in the past". However this did not provide an adequate "economic rationality as a private enterprise" for Hitachi to proceed.

In April 2020, a director of Horizon Nuclear Power stated that the future of next two nuclear builds, Wylfa and Oldbury, depended on the government accepting the Regulated Asset Base (RAB) financial assistance model rather than the existing Contract for Difference support mechanism, which would allow developers to need less upfront private finance with some finance backed through end consumer bills.

On 2 June 2020, EDF Energy announced that it had submitted a development consent order to the UK government prior to starting construction on the Sizewell C site in Suffolk. However EDF have yet to organise financing, and cannot take on more construction risk in the UK. EDF is looking to the UK government to assist on financing either by offering a Regulated Asset Base model, though that puts an immediate cost burden on end consumers, or through other approaches such as a government equity stake in the development. On 30 June, EDF announced that it had applied to the Office for Nuclear Regulation for a licence to build and operate Sizewell C.

On 24 September 2020, when Prime Minister Boris Johnson was asked about new technology in the UK's fight against climate change, he reaffirmed support for nuclear power in the UK, by saying to the BBC, "I do think nuclear has to be part of the mix", whilst also saying that the UK can be the "Saudi Arabia of wind power".

==== List ====
Proposed nuclear power stations in the United Kingdom, with currently shelved proposals in italics, are:

Name	Location	Proposed output	Proposed builder	Proposed reactor type	start of construction	proposed start of generation	Link	Notes
Bradwell B	Essex	2.2 GW	CGN and EDF	Hualong One	2025 (proposed)	2030		Target commercial operation date about 2030
Hinkley Point C	Somerset	3.2 GW	EDF	EPR	2018	2023 (now expected around 2030)		Construction began December 2018
Moorside	Cumbria	3-3.4 GW	NuGeneration	AP1000	Cancelled	–		8 November 2018 Toshiba announced withdrawal from the development
Moorside clean energy hub	Cumbria	3.2 GW	EDF	EPR	–	–		Proposed July 2020
Oldbury B	Gloucestershire	2.7 GW	Horizon Nuclear Power	ABWR	Cancelled			Shelved in January 2019
Sizewell C	Suffolk	3.2 GW	EDF and CGN	EPR	2024			Public consultation began in 2012 Granted development consent by the government in 2022 Construction began in 2024
Wylfa Newydd	Anglesey	3.0 GW	Horizon Nuclear Power	ABWR	Cancelled			Shelved in January 2019.
Wylfa SMR	Anglesey	1.5 GW	Rolls-Royce / GBE-N	SMR	Mid 2020s (proposed)	2030s		Announced November 2025
Total of active proposals		7.9 GW						

Two other sites, Heysham and Hartlepool, were identified as possible locations in 2010 but no commercial proposals were made for these sites.

==== Sizewell C ====
The project has completed its stage 4 consultation, which is allowing EDF to submit its planning application which is expected to be at the start of 2020, before a decision is made on the plant's future in 2020. After this, construction was expected to start around 2021, with an accelerated timeline due to the replication of the Hinkley Point C power plant on the site, but no progress had occurred by 2024. On 27 May 2020, EDF energy put in a development consent order application, prior to the start of construction at the site.

== Waste management and disposal ==
The UK has a large variety of different intermediate- and high-level radioactive wastes, coming from national programmes to develop nuclear weapons and nuclear power. It is a national responsibility to pay for the management of these. In addition, new nuclear power stations could be built, the waste management from which would be the private sector's financial responsibility, although all would be stored in a single facility. Most of the UK's higher-activity radioactive waste is currently held in temporary storage at Sellafield. As of 2019, the 60-years long nuclear programme produced 2,150 m^{3} (76,000 cubic feet) equivalent to a 13 m × 13 m × 13 m (43 ft × 43 ft × 43 ft) cube of high-level waste.

The UK has approximately 70,000 tonnes of irradiated graphite, mainly as moderator in Magnox and AGR reactors. Most of its radioactivity will have decayed away 60–70 years after reactor closure, but its carbon-14 content is a long-term radiological hazard which can be released in gaseous form making it a large volume intermediate-level waste. Research on how to handle this waste is ongoing, which will lead to an informed decision on management.

On 31 July 2006, the Committee on Radioactive Waste Management (CoRWM), published its final report on long-term waste management. Its main recommendation was that geological disposal should be adopted. This would involve burial of high-level waste at 200 to 1,000 metres (660 to 3,280 ft) deep in a purpose-built facility with no intention to retrieve the waste in the future. It was concluded that this could not be implemented for several decades, and that there were "social and ethical concerns within UK society about the disposal option that would need to be resolved as part of the implementation process". Such a repository should start to be closed as soon as practicable rather than being left open for future generations. Fourteen additional recommendations were also made.

On 12 June 2008, a white paper, Managing Radioactive Waste Safely, A Framework for Implementing Geological Disposal was published confirming CoRWM's conclusion of geologic disposal of higher-activity wastes. The policy announcement confirmed that there would be one geologic disposal site, for both national legacy waste as well as potential wastes from future programmes. It announced that a process of volunteerism would be used in selecting a suitable site and invited communities from the UK to express interest. They would be rewarded by the infrastructure investment for the facility, jobs for the long term and a tailored package of benefits.

In January 2014, the building of the first dry spent PWR nuclear fuel store in the UK began at Sizewell B, where the existing spent fuel pool, which stores spent fuel under water, was expected to reach full capacity in 2015. It is intended to enable spent nuclear fuel produced from 2016 until at least 2035 to be stored at Sizewell B until a deep geological repository is available. In March 2017, the first cask containing spent nuclear fuel was installed.

In 2023, UK Nuclear Waste Services (NWS), launched in January 2022, began studies to evaluate sites that could be suitable for a geological disposal facility in locally agreed community partnerships areas in Allerdale and Copeland in Cumbria near the Sellafield plant, and in Theddlethorpe in Lincolnshire. After any site is selected, it would take 10–15 years for further detailed investigative work. In 2025, the HM Treasury's National Infrastructure and Service Transformation Authority annual review graded the project, estimated to cost up to £54 billion, as "unachievable", stating it had "major issues with project definition, schedule, budget, quality and/or benefits delivery, which at this stage do not appear to be manageable or resolvable."

== Decommissioning ==
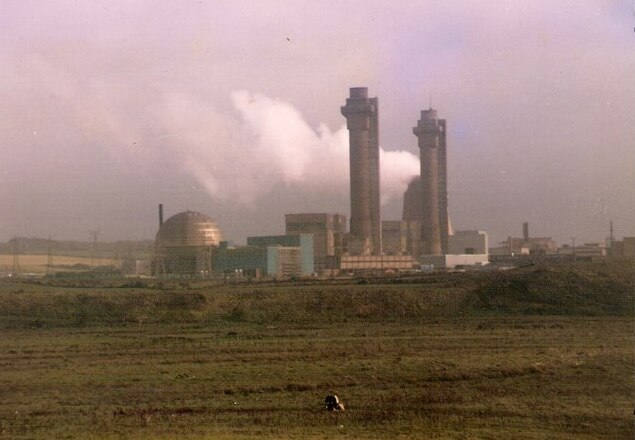
The Windscale Piles in Cumbria (currently being decommissioned). They are discharging steam, not smoke.

=== Responsibility ===
The Nuclear Decommissioning Authority (NDA), formed in April 2005 under the Energy Act 2004, oversees and manages the decommissioning and clean-up of the UK's older Magnox power plants and the reprocessing facilities at Sellafield, which were transferred to its ownership from BNFL, and the former nuclear research and development facilities previously run by the UKAEA.

=== Sites ===
In August 2005, the following sites were listed for decommissioning:

- Berkeley, Gloucestershire
- Bradwell, Essex
- Calder Hall, Cumbria
- Capenhurst, Cheshire
- Chapelcross, Dumfriesshire
- Culham, Oxfordshire
- Dounreay, Caithness
- Drigg, Cumbria
- Dungeness, Kent
- Harwell, Oxfordshire
- Hinkley Point, Somerset
- Hunterston, Ayrshire
- Oldbury, Gloucestershire
- Sellafield / Windscale, Cumbria
- Sizewell, Suffolk
- Springfields, Lancashire
- Trawsfynydd, Gwynedd
- Winfrith, Dorset
- Wylfa, Isle of Anglesey

=== Costs ===
Prior to the 2002 white paper Managing the Nuclear Legacy, the cost of decommissioning these facilities had been estimated at £42 billion. The white paper estimated the costs at £48 billion at March 2002 prices, an increase of £6 billion, with the cost of decommissioning Sellafield accounting for over 65% of the total. This figure included a rise in BNFL's estimated decommissioning liabilities from £35 billion to £40.5 billion, with an estimate of £7.4 billion for UKAEA.

In June 2003, the Department of Trade and Industry estimated that decommissioning costs, including the cost of running the facilities still in operation for their remaining life, were approximately £56 billion at 2003 prices, although the figure was 'almost certainly' expected to rise. This estimate was revised in subsequent years; to £57 billion in September 2004; £63 billion in September 2005; £65 billion in March 2006; and to £73 billion in March 2007. Around £46 billion of the £73 billion is for the decommissioning and clean-up of the Sellafield site.

In May 2008, a senior director at the Nuclear Decommissioning Authority (NDA) indicated that the figure of £73 billion might increase by several billion pounds. In 2019, the cost was given as £129 billion.

In addition to the NDA's costs, British Energy's liabilities in relation to spent nuclear fuels have risen. In February 2006, it was reported that these had increased to £5.3 billion, an increase of almost £1 billion. The costs of handling these is to be met by the Nuclear Liabilities Fund (NLF), the successor to the Nuclear Generation Decommissioning Fund. Although British Energy contributes to the NLF, the fund is underwritten by the Government. The House of Commons Public Accounts Committee noted in 2007 that British Energy may lack an incentive to reduce the eventual liabilities falling to the Nuclear Liabilities Fund.

== Safety ==
=== Seismicity ===
Until the expansion of nuclear power in the 1980s, seismic activity in the UK had not received a great deal of attention. As a result of the new interest in the topic, in 1994 the British Geological Survey published a catalogue of earthquakes.

Although earthquakes are relatively frequent, they rarely cause damage to well-constructed structures. Two of the largest, estimated at 5.75 (moderate) on the Richter scale occurred in 1382 and 1580. Evaluation of past earthquakes indicates that the UK is unlikely to be subject to earthquakes larger than a magnitude of approximately 6.5.

The occurrence of tsunamis impacting the UK is rare, with only two (possibly three) having been identified; a 3 m (9.8 ft) high wave as a result of the 1755 Lisbon earthquake, and a 21 m (69 ft) high tsunami in 6100 BC which occurred under very different geological conditions (Storegga Slide). In recent years there has been an accumulation of evidence indicating that the 1607 Bristol Channel floods may also have resulted from a tsunami that rose from a height of 4 m (13 ft) to over 6 m (20 ft) as it passed up the Bristol Channel.

A 2005 report for DEFRA, conducted following the 2004 Boxing Day tsunami, found that, discounting 'exotic events such as meteorite impacts', 'in most plausible circumstances it is likely that such an event would be contained by current defences, designed to resist storm surges, for all major developed areas', however the joint occurrence of events, such as a tsunami coinciding with a storm surge, was discounted. The report did, however call for additional more detailed modelling to be carried out, recommended that the Met Office should provide a tsunami warning service, and that detection devices should be upgraded. A follow-up report indicated that, of the three likely scenarios modelled, a Lisbon-type event would pose the greatest danger, potentially resulting in a tsunami wave exceeding the 1:100-year extreme sea level at the Cornish peninsula by up to 1.4 m (4 ft 7 in), but being within the range elsewhere. This conclusion is markedly different from the greater heights calculated by Bryant and Haslett as having been encountered in the Bristol Channel during the 1607 Bristol Channel floods.

Speaking before the Energy and Climate Change Select Committee on 15 March 2011, about the Fukushima I nuclear accidents, Energy and Climate Change Minister Chris Huhne expressed concern over extreme weather events in the UK, but stated that 'we are lucky that we do not have to suffer from tsunamis'.

=== Accidents ===
Nuclear power incidents in the UK
Date	Location	Description	INES level	Fatalities	Cost (in millions 2006 US$)
19 April 2005	Sellafield	20 tonnes of uranium and 160 kg (350 lb) plutonium leak from a cracked pipe at the Thorp nuclear fuel reprocessing plant into a secondary containment vessel	2 3	0	65

== Security ==
The Civil Nuclear Constabulary is responsible for security at civil nuclear sites, within 5 km (3.1 miles) of site boundaries, and for nuclear materials in transit. The UK is involved in the Nuclear Security Summit series of world summits held since 2010. During 2016 the UK and the US staged a training exercise simulating a cyber-attack on a nuclear power station.

== Public opinion and protests ==
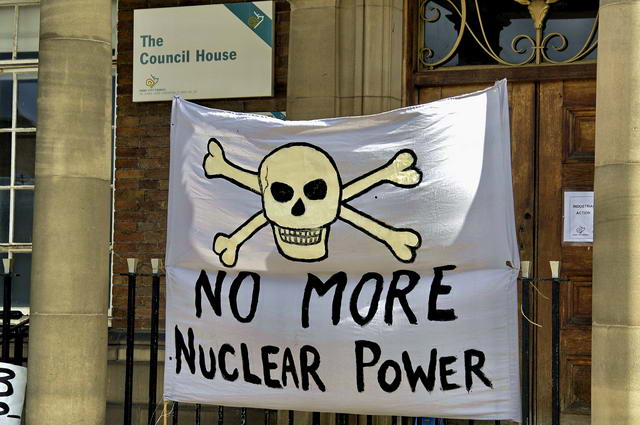
In March 2006, a protest took place in Derby where campaigners handed a letter to Margaret Beckett, head of DEFRA, outside Derby City Council about the dangers of nuclear power stations.

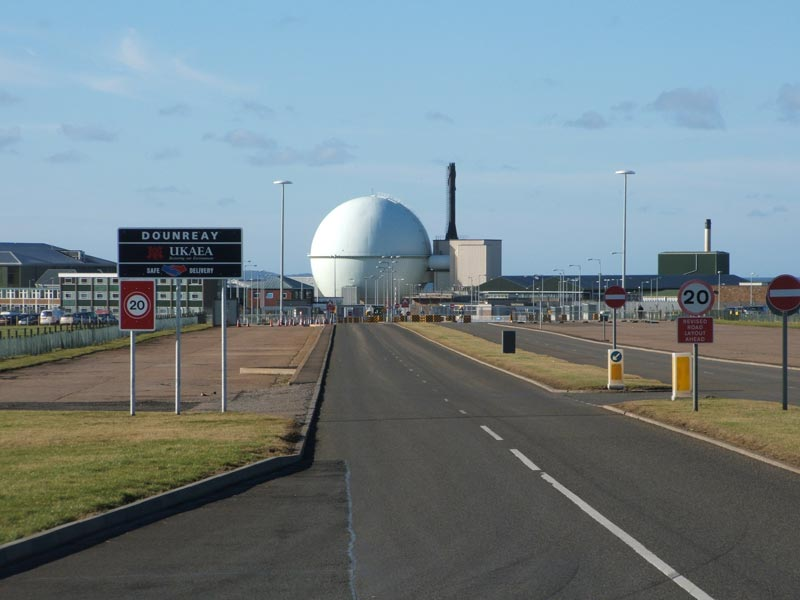
Dounreay in northern Scotland

In the early 1990s, concern was raised in the United Kingdom about the effect of nuclear power plants on unborn children, when clusters of leukaemia cases were discovered nearby to some of these plants. The effect was speculative because clusters were also found where no nuclear plants were present, and not all plants had clusters around them. Detailed studies carried out by the Committee on Medical Aspects of Radiation in the Environment (COMARE) in 2003 found no evidence of raised childhood cancer around nuclear power plants, but did find an excess of leukaemia and non-Hodgkin's lymphoma (NHL) near other nuclear installations including Sellafield, AWE Burghfield and UKAEA Dounreay. COMARE's opinion is that "the excesses around Sellafield and Dounreay are unlikely to be due to chance, although there is not at present a convincing explanation for them".

An opinion poll in Britain in 2002 by MORI on behalf of Greenpeace showed large support for wind power and a majority for putting an end to nuclear energy if the costs were the same. In November 2005, a YouGov poll conducted by business advisory firm Deloitte found that 36% of the UK population supported the use of nuclear power, though 62% would support an energy policy that combines nuclear along with renewable technologies. The same survey also revealed high public expectations for the future rate of renewables development – with 35% expecting the majority of electricity to come from renewables in only 15 years, which is more than double the government's expectation.

In the early 2000s, there was a heated discussion about nuclear waste, leading to the creation of the Nuclear Decommissioning Authority (see above).

A large nationally representative 2010 British survey about energy issues found that public opinion is divided on the issue of nuclear power. The majority of people are concerned about nuclear power and public trust in the government and nuclear industry remains relatively low. The survey showed that there is a clear preference for renewable energy sources over nuclear power.

According to a national opinion poll, support for nuclear power in the UK dropped by 12 per cent following the 2011 Fukushima nuclear disaster. However, support recovered within a few months.

In October 2011, more than 200 protesters blockaded the Hinkley Point C nuclear power station site. Members of several anti-nuclear groups that are part of the Stop New Nuclear alliance barred access to the site in protest at EDF Energy's plans to renew the site with two new reactors.

In January 2012, three hundred anti-nuclear protesters took to the streets of Llangefni, against plans to build a new nuclear power station at Wylfa. The march was organised by a number of organisations, including Pobl Atal Wylfa B, Greenpeace and Cymdeithas yr Iaith, which are supporting farmer Richard Jones who is in dispute with Horizon.

In July 2012, a YouGov poll reported that 63% of UK respondents agreed that nuclear generation should be part of the country's energy mix, up from 61% in 2010. Opposition fell to 11%.

In February 2013, a YouGov poll published in the Sunday Times found that nuclear was the most popular choice to provide for Britain's future energy needs.

In February 2013, a poll published by Ipsos MORI which queried 1,046 British individuals determined that support for new nuclear generation capacity was at 42%, with the proportion opposed to new nuclear generation being reported as unchanged at 20%, close to the lowest recorded proportion, by the agency in 2010, of 19% opposed. The results also report that the proportion that was undecided or neutral had increased, and it stood at 38%.

In 2013, a survey by Harris Interactive of more than 2,000 UK respondents found that 'one in four people (24%) considered nuclear power to offer the greatest potential' alongside solar (23%) and ahead of wind power (18%). Immediately following the announcement of the agreement between EDF and the UK government, 35% considered it to be a positive step, 21% felt it was a negative development and 28% were indifferent.

The Green Party programme postulates that "nuclear power, coal and incineration of waste will be phased out" (EN014), although this position is debated within the party, as a significant group of members called for review of the policy, which they consider anti-scientific and "irrational" and consider introduction of zero-emission nuclear power, along with renewable energy sources, to be a critical instrument for mitigation of climate change.

In a 2021 YouGov poll, 65% of those surveyed said nuclear power should play a role in the country's climate policy and 12% expressed strong anti-nuclear sentiment, while 46% were aware that nuclear power is a low-carbon energy source.

== Nuclear power in Scotland ==
Although the UK Government has given the go-ahead for a new generation of nuclear power stations to be built, the Scottish Government has made clear that no new nuclear power stations will be built in Scotland and is aiming instead for a non-nuclear future. This was made clear in 2008, when First Minister Alex Salmond said there was 'no chance' of any new nuclear power stations being built in Scotland. In 2008, the Scottish Government's stance was backed by the Scottish Parliament that voted 63–58 to support the Scottish Government's policy of opposing new nuclear power stations.

== See also ==
- Anti-nuclear movement in the United Kingdom
- Nuclear energy in Ireland
- Nuclear energy policy
- Nuclear or Not?
- Politics of the United Kingdom
