= NNB Generation Company =

British nuclear energy subsidiary

NNB Generation Company Limited
- Industry: Nuclear power
- Founded: 2009
- Headquarters: United Kingdom
- Products: Electricity
- Parent: EDF Energy

Nuclear New Build Generation Company (NNB GenCo) is a subsidiary created by EDF Energy to build and then to operate two new nuclear power stations in the United Kingdom. The new plants are to be Hinkley Point C and Sizewell C and will eventually produce up to 6.4 GW in total.

EDF initially entered the UK nuclear industry with the acquisition of British Energy in 2009. At the same time, EDF established NNB GenCo as a separate subsidiary for the construction of additional new nuclear plants. Centrica purchased a 20% stake in British Energy from EDF, and also had an option to acquire 20% of NNB GenCo, but on 4 February 2013, Centrica stated it would withdraw from the project.

The company's plans include building four new nuclear reactors adjacent to existing plants, two at Hinkley Point C in Somerset and two at Sizewell C in Suffolk. Framatome's (previously Areva) European Pressurized Reactor is the preferred design for the sites.

== See also ==
- Economics of new nuclear power plants
- Nuclear power in the United Kingdom
- Energy use and conservation in the United Kingdom
