= EDF Energy =

Energy company in the United Kingdom

EDF Energy Ltd
- Type: Subsidiary
- Industry: Energy
- Predecessor: British Energy
- Founded: 2002; 24 years ago
- Headquarters: London, England, United Kingdom
- Key people: Simone Rossi (CEO)
- Products: Natural gas Electricity
- Revenue: £8,720 million (2021)
- Net income: (£1,779 million) (2021)
- Number of employees: 11,516 (2021)
- Parent: Électricité de France
- Website: www.edfenergy.com

EDF Energy is a British integrated energy company, wholly owned by the French state-owned EDF (Électricité de France), with operations spanning electricity generation and the sale of natural gas and electricity to homes and businesses throughout the United Kingdom. It employs 11,717 people, and handles 5.22 million business and residential customer accounts.

== History ==
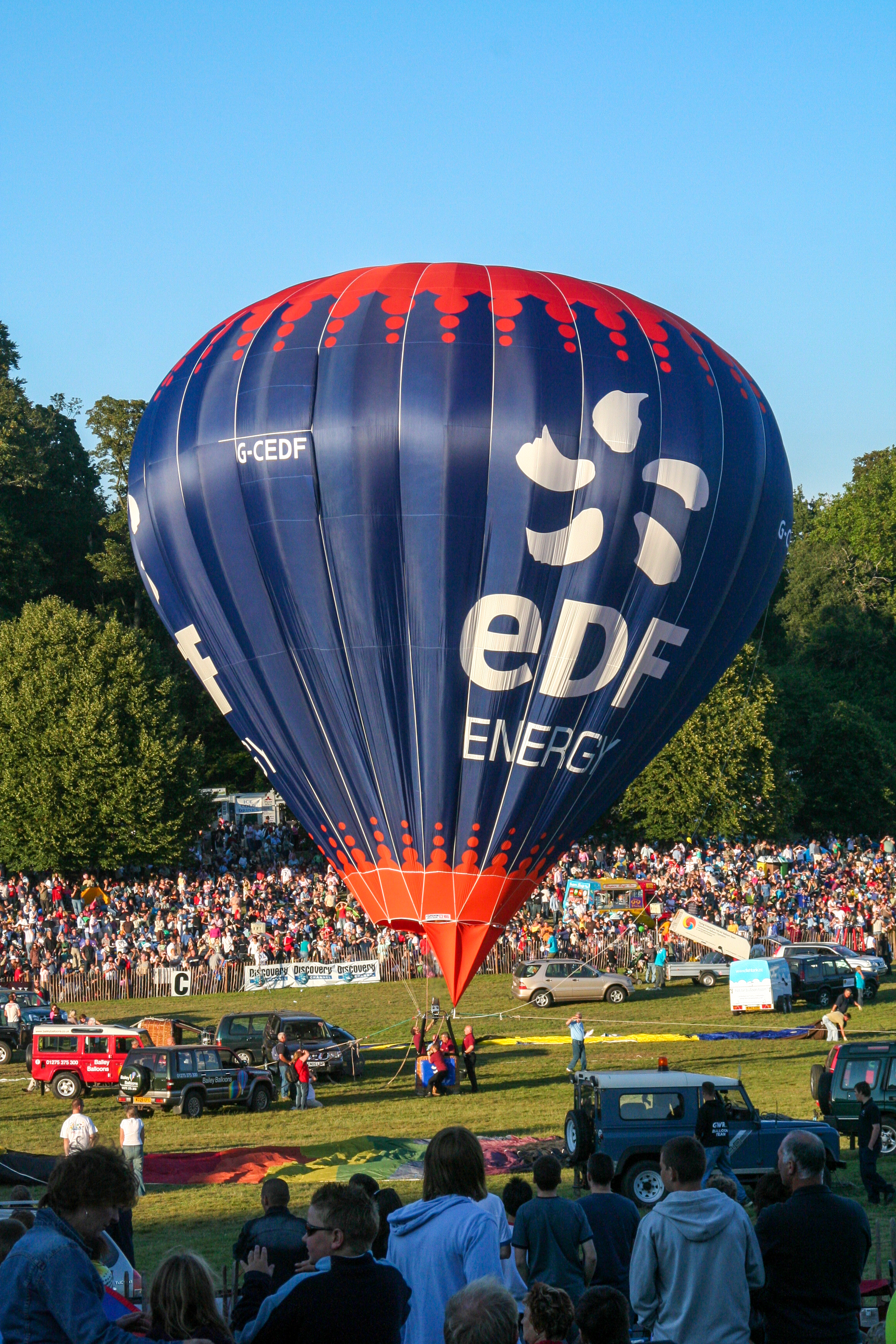
EDF-sponsored balloon

EDF Energy Customers (trading as EDF) is wholly owned by the French state-owned EDF (Électricité de France) and was formed in January 2002, following the acquisition and mergers of Seeboard plc (formerly the South Eastern Electricity Board), London Electricity plc (formerly the London Electricity Board or LEB), SWEB Energy plc (formerly the South Western Electricity Board), Virgin Energy, two coal fired power stations and a combined cycle gas turbine power station. The new group was initially led by MD John Kinsey and Marketing and Sales Director Gary Tubb, both from Virgin Energy.

In 2009, EDF took control of the nuclear generator in the United Kingdom, British Energy, buying share capital from the government. This made EDF one of the largest generators in the United Kingdom.

The development branch of EDF was formed in April 2004, bringing together the separate infrastructure interests of what were LE Group, Seeboard and SWEB. The focus for the branch is development activity through the participation in major new infrastructure projects, largely in the public sector through public-private partnership (PPP) and private finance initiative (PFI) type schemes.

The electricity distribution (or downstream) networks formerly known as EDF Energy Networks were sold in November 2010 to Hong Kong–based Cheung Kong Group (CKG), owned by billionaire Li Ka Shing. Later, EDF Energy Networks was renamed to UK Power Networks. In December 2014, EDF sold three small UK based wind farms with a combined capacity of 73 megawatts to the China General Nuclear Power Group for an estimated £100 million.

In November 2017, EDF sold its majority stake in five wind farms across Cambridgeshire and Lincolnshire for £98 million.

A release from EDF confirmed that in 2018 the firm lost 200,000 consumers due to them shopping around a competitive marketplace. EDF also found that earnings for its UK business had fallen by 16.5% to £691 million in the year to 31 December.

On 4 November 2019 EDF announced the acquisition British start up Pivot Power, who specialise in battery storage and infrastructure for electric vehicle charging.

EDF acquired a majority stake in Pod Point, one of the largest electric vehicle (EV) charging companies in the UK, in February 2020.

On 31 August 2021, EDF announced the sales of its 1332 MW combined cycle gas turbine power station and 49 MW battery at West Burton B to EIG.

The UK's nuclear stations, run by EDF, reached a milestone in November 2021, clocking up 2000 terawatt hours (TWh) of electricity – enough to power all the UK's homes for more than 18 years.

=== No Dash For Gas action ===
In February 2013, EDF sought an estimated £5 million in damages from environmental activists from the No Dash for Gas campaign, who occupied the EDF owned West Burton CCGT power station in October 2012, and pleaded guilty to charges of aggravated trespass.

It is unusual in the United Kingdom for companies to seek damages from protesters. Environmentalist George Monbiot, writing in The Guardian, said EDF was conducting a strategic lawsuit against public participation, "part of a global strategy by corporations to stifle democracy", and predicted the "disastrous unintended consequences of an attempt at censorship" could result in the Streisand effect and be comparable to the McLibel case.

The activists received support in the days since the case became public, with over 6,000 signatures on a supportive petition at Change.org within the first day, and over 64,000 by the time EDF dropped their lawsuit on 13 March 2013, saying that this was "a fair and reasonable solution" after the protesters had "agreed in principle to accept a permanent injunction which prevents them from entering multiple sites operated by EDF Energy".

== Electricity generation ==
=== Nuclear ===
Following the acquisition of British Energy in 2009, the EDF portfolio includes eight nuclear power stations. They are seven AGR power stations (Dungeness B; Hinkley Point B; Hunterston B; Hartlepool; Heysham 1; Heysham 2 and Torness) and one PWR power station (Sizewell B), totalling nearly 9,000 MW of installed capacity.

In 2007, EDF announced its intention to construct up to four new EPR design reactors; two at Hinkley Point C (currently scheduled to start operation in 2025), two at Sizewell C and Bradwell B. EDF plans to build and operate the new plants through its subsidiary NNB Generation Company (NNB GenCo).

In August 2014, the company announced it had shut down four of its 15 reactors for a period of eight weeks to investigate potential cracking in the boiler spine.

In 2015, EDF announced a 10-year life extension for Dungeness B, initially pushing back the closure date until 2028, but subsequently ceased production and commenced defuelling in June 2021. In February 2016, EDF announced that it would keep four of its nuclear plants open in the United Kingdom. Heysham 1 and Hartlepool will have their life extended by five years until 2024, while Heysham 2 and Torness will see their closure dates pushed back by seven years to 2030.

In November 2020 EDF announced Hinkley Point B power station in Somerset will move into the defuelling phase no later than 15 July 2022.

=== Wind ===
As of 2021, EDF owns and operates 37 wind farms including the 59 turbine onshore wind farm at Dorenell in Scotland, and are developing two offshore wind projects at Codling Wind Park in Ireland and Neart na Gaoithe in Scotland. The company have plans for a floating offshore wind development at Blyth and a 22-turbine onshore wind farm Garn Fach in Wales.

=== Solar energy ===
EDF develop, operate and maintain solar projects. Sutton Bridge is the company's first solar farm of grid-scale and will be approximately 139 hectares. In 2019 EDF signed an agreement to install solar panels on the roofs of some of Tesco's largest stores in England.

=== Fossil fuel ===
EDF owned and operated one 2,000 MW coal-fired power station, West Burton A Power Station, located near Retford in Nottinghamshire. Generation at West Burton A power station ended on 31 March 2023.

=== Energy percentages ===
In the period from April 2020 to March 2021, the percentage of electricity generated by EDF from each source was as follows: nuclear – 62.1%, renewable – 29%, gas – 7.5%, coal – 1.3% with average CO_{2} intensity of 42 gCO_{2}eq/kWh.

In 2020, EDF nuclear power plants provided 16.1% of UK total electricity generation, down from 17.3% in 2019. As of 2020 EDF supplied 32.4% of low-carbon energy in the UK energy mix.

== EDF Renewables ==
EDF Renewables in the UK is a joint venture between EDF Renewables Group and EDF.

In April 2017, EDF Renewable Energy, in a joint venture with EDF, announced the commissioning of the Corriemoillie (47.5 MW), Beck Burn (31 MW) and Pearie Law (19.2 MW) wind farms. Beck Burn was opened in July that year. Also in July 2017, EDF Renewables announced the acquisition of 11 Scottish wind farm sites from asset manager Partnerships for Renewables, with a potential capacity of 600 MW.

In May 2018, EDF Energies Nouvelles bought the Neart na Gaoithe wind farm in Scotland from Irish company Mainstream Renewable Power, following a competitive process. It will produce 450 MW. The farm is planned to go online in 2023.

EDF Renewables opened its wind farm in Blyth in July 2018, where the individual turbines are connected via 66-kilometre (41 mi) offshore cables to bring the electricity produced onshore.

== Sponsorship ==
EDF is the "in Association" sponsor of Cheltenham Science Festival and have been supporters of the Big Bang Fair since 2015.

EDF has sponsored several shows on ITV, including Soapstar Superstar and City Lights. It also sponsored coverage of the 2006 World Cup in Germany (shared with Budweiser) and coverage of the 2007 Rugby World Cup (shared with Peugeot)

EDF was the main sponsor of the Anglo-Welsh Cup – the Rugby Union domestic cup for the twelve clubs in the English Premiership and the four Welsh regions – between 2006 and 2009. In July 2007, EDF was confirmed as another Level One sponsor for London 2012 with exclusive branding rights and Olympic team sponsorship for the 2008, 2010 and 2012 games as well as being the official energy provider.

In August 2008, EDF formed a partnership with The British Red Cross to help vulnerable people to get support during power failures. In January 2011, EDF took over sponsorship from British Airways of the London Eye, on a three-year deal renaming the London Eye as the EDF Energy London Eye.

== Marketing ==
On 4 January 2008, EDF began advertising on the television through ITV, Channel 4, Channel 5 and various satellite channels, using "It's not easy being green" as their slogan to target a new greener eco-friendly image. In 2009, with Euro RSCG London, EDF created the Team Green Britain campaign, in which Olympic athletes encouraged Britons to be more environmentally aware.

On 2 April 2012, EDF launched an advert, including their new mascot, Zingy.

In 2020 EDF launched their new brand purpose focused on tackling climate change and aired a TV advertising campaign promoting their new company ambition and purpose "Helping Britain achieve Net Zero".

== Distribution network operators ==
EDF Energy Networks was founded as a merger of Distribution Network Operators but has since divested from this area of work in November, 2010 to Hong Kong-based Cheung Kong Group (CKG), owned by billionaire Li Ka Shing. The DSO of EDF Energy Networks was renamed to UK Power Networks.

EDG is now an energy generator and supplier.

== EDF's main locations ==
EDF's main offices are located in London, Exeter, Sunderland, Hove and Hucclecote in Gloucester.

== See also ==
- Energy policy of the United Kingdom
- Energy use and conservation in the United Kingdom
- Green electricity in the United Kingdom
