= James Hann (businessman) =

British businessman

Sir James Hann CBE (18 January 1933 – 14 February 2004) was a British businessman and former chairman of Scottish Nuclear.

== Early life ==
He was born in Southampton. He had a brother and sister. He would later study at the Institut pour l'Etude des Methodes de Direction de l'Entreprise (IMEDE, now IMD) in Lausanne. From 1952-54 he did his National Service in the Royal Artillery.

== Career ==
=== Scottish Nuclear ===
He became Chairman of Scottish Nuclear. It was planned to sell off the entire electricity industry, but the stock market would not buy the nuclear industry components as they contained too much risk and long-term cost. British Energy was actually privatised in 1996, having been formed in 1995.

Scottish Nuclear consisted of Hunterston B in North Ayrshire, and Torness in East Lothian; the two AGR power stations had been run by the South of Scotland Electricity Board before privatisation. Hunterston A had been shut down the day before privatisation (31 March 1990). Scottish Nuclear supplied 40% of Scottish electricity. As a Chairman, his salary was £39,000. He joined the European Nuclear Society.

== Personal life ==
He married Jill Howe in 1957 in Southampton. His wife was a nursing sister when he went into hospital. They had a son (born 1959) and a daughter (born 1961). He lived in Wrington in North Somerset. When Chairman of Scottish Nuclear, he lived in Dunbartonshire, and had earlier lived in Banchory. He was appointed CBE in the 1977 Silver Jubilee and Birthday Honours. He was knighted in the 1996 Birthday Honours. His wife died in 1999.

== See also ==
- Energy policy of the United Kingdom
- Nuclear power in the United Kingdom

Business positions
Preceded by New company	Chairman of Scottish Nuclear; 1990 - 1996	Succeeded by Defunct company, subsumed into British Energy
