= Scottish Nuclear =

Nuclear energy company (1990-1996)

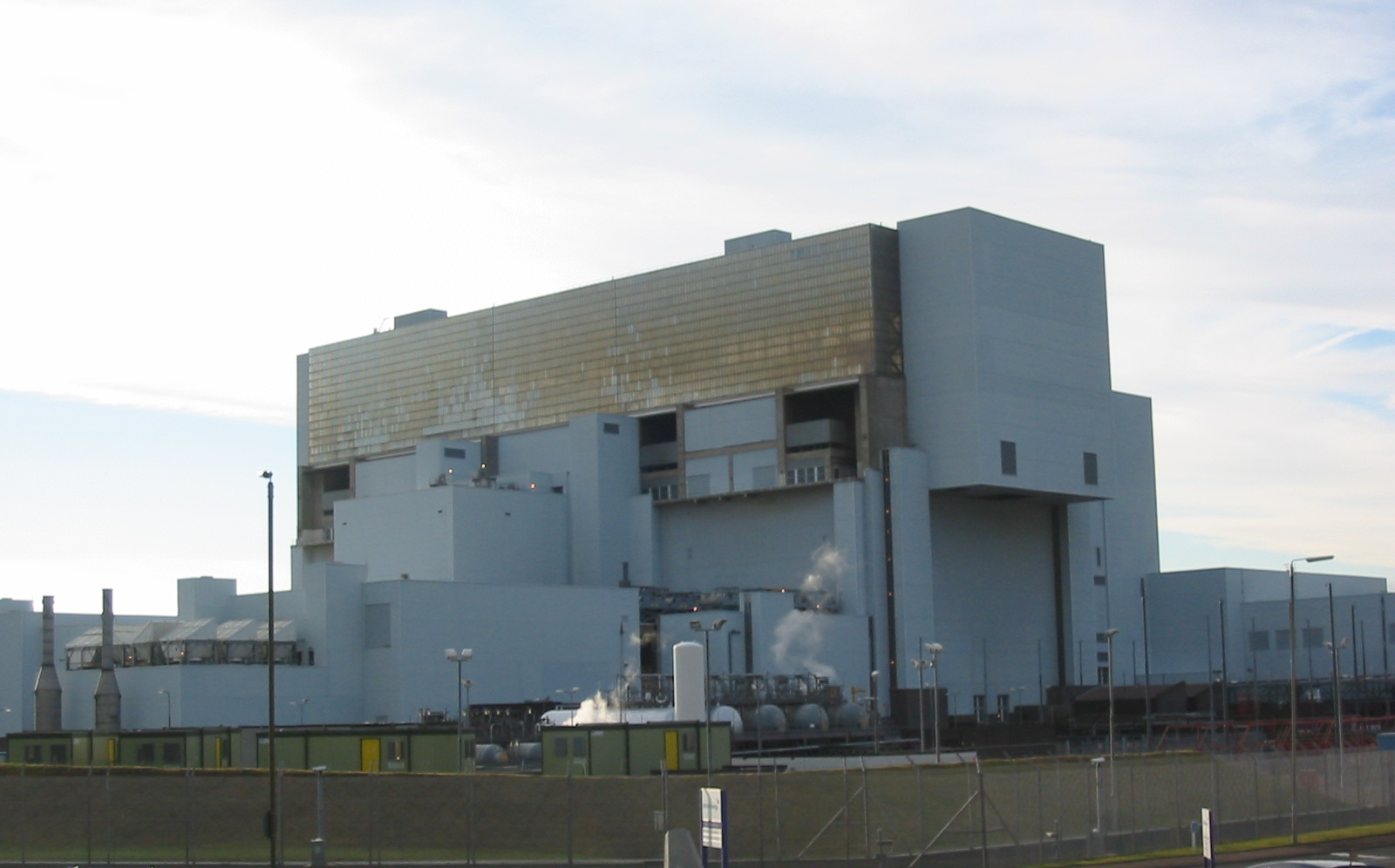
- Torness Nuclear Power Station
- Founded: 1990
- Defunct: 1996
- Successor: British Energy (1996); EDF Energy (2010)
- Headquarters: United Kingdom
- Area served: Scotland

Scottish Nuclear was formed as a precursor to the privatisation of the electricity supply industry in Scotland on 1 April 1990. A purpose-built headquarters was built in 1992 in the new town of East Kilbride.

It consisted of the nuclear assets of the South of Scotland Electricity Board, which were later absorbed into the 1996 founded companies – Magnox Electric and British Energy.

== Assets ==
- Hunterston A Magnox Power Station (by then shut down)
- Hunterston B AGR Power Station
- Torness AGR Power Station

== History ==
=== Background : before 1990 ===
In the late 1980s, the 1955-founded South of Scotland Electricity Board (SSEB), was one of the two major electricity generation and transmission companies in Scotland; other being North of Scotland Hydro-Electric Board (now SSE plc). The SSEB generated, transmitted and distributed electricity throughout the south of Scotland, including the former regions of Strathclyde, Lothian, Fife, Central, Borders and Dumfries and Galloway and a few towns in northern England.

=== Scottish Nuclear : 1990–1996 ===
On 1 April 1990, the nuclear generation assets (Hunterston A, Hunterston B and Torness Power Stations) of SSEB were vested with a new private company – Scottish Nuclear. The chairman of the company was Sir James Hann.

The remainder of the SSEB assets were privatised as ScottishPower in 1991.

=== Breakup : 1996 ===
In 1996, the older Magnox reactor – Hunterston A was transferred to Magnox Electric – established to own and operate a proportion of the old Magnox nuclear stations of Nuclear Electric. The assets of Magnox Electric were later combined with BNFL in 1998, and eventually operated and managed by US-based EnergySolutions through its June 2007 acquisition of the BFNL subsidiary – Reactor Sites Management Company.

The remaining two advanced "AGR" nuclear plant assets of the company were combined with the assets of Nuclear Electric; and became a part of the newly formed and soon to be privatised British Energy (now EDF Energy).

Through the breakup, both the companies – Scottish Nuclear and Nuclear Electric became defunct; but is still extant through a descendant company – EDF Energy.

== See also ==
- Energy policy of the United Kingdom
- Energy use and conservation in the United Kingdom
