= British Energy =

Electricity generation company in the UK

- Industry: Electricity generation
- Founded: 1995
- Defunct: 2009, continued as subsidiary until 30 June 2011
- Fate: Acquired by Électricité de France, delisted 3 February 2009
- Successor: EDF Energy
- Headquarters: London, UK
- Products: electrical power
- Revenue: £2,999M (2007)
- Operating income: £794M (2007)
- Net income: £465M (2007)

British Energy was the UK's largest electricity generation company by volume, before being taken over by Électricité de France (EDF) in 2009. British Energy operated eight former UK state-owned nuclear power stations and one coal-fired power station.

From 1 July 2010 the rebranding of British Energy locations and communications to EDF Energy commenced as part of its incorporation into the parent group, following around 17 months of dual branding. This was concluded with the renaming of the operating company from British Energy Generation Limited to EDF Energy Nuclear Generation Limited on 1 July 2011.

== Structure ==
In 2009, the British Energy subsidiary group was structured accordingly:

- British Energy Group plc: holding company, a wholly owned subsidiary of EDF S.A.
  - British Energy Generation Ltd: dominant subsidiary; owned and ran the large power stations, was licensed to operate nuclear power stations.
  - District Energy Ltd: owned four modern 10 MWe natural gas-fuelled power plants.
  - British Energy Renewables Ltd: participated in a small number of renewable power projects.
  - Lewis Wind Power Ltd: joint venture with AMEC to develop a proposed wind farm on the Isle of Lewis.

== History ==
=== Early history and development ===
British Energy was established and registered in Scotland in 1995 to operate the eight most modern nuclear power plants in the UK. It took the two advanced gas-cooled reactor (AGR) plants from Scottish Nuclear and five AGR and a sole pressurised water reactor (PWR) plant from Nuclear Electric. The residual Magnox power stations from these two companies were transferred to Magnox Electric which later became the generation division of British Nuclear Fuels Ltd. The company was privatised in 1996.

It retained major technical offices at Barnwood, formerly the HQ of Nuclear Electric, and Peel Park, formerly the HQ of Scottish Nuclear.

In June 1999, in an attempt to become an integrated generating and retail company, British Energy bought the retail electricity and gas supplier SWALEC based in Wales, providing 6% of the England and Wales electricity supply market. However it was unable to purchase another retailer at a reasonable cost to create a widespread retail presence, so sold SWALEC a few months later to Scottish and Southern Energy.

British Energy bought the 2,000 MWe Eggborough coal-fired station from National Power in 2000, to provide a more flexible power production facility and reduce penalty charge risks from the New Electricity Trading Arrangements introduced in March 2001. Despite this, the new arrangements led to a significantly lower electricity price for inflexible base load power stations such as British Energy had. The purchase of Eggborough occurred at the peak of the market for power stations, and in 2002, the value of the station was written down by half.

In 2001, the company was the major partner in taking on an operating lease to become the operator of Bruce Nuclear Generating Station in Ontario, Canada. The resultant subsidiary was called Bruce Power. As part of financial re-structuring, Bruce Power was sold to a consortium of Canadian investors in February 2003.

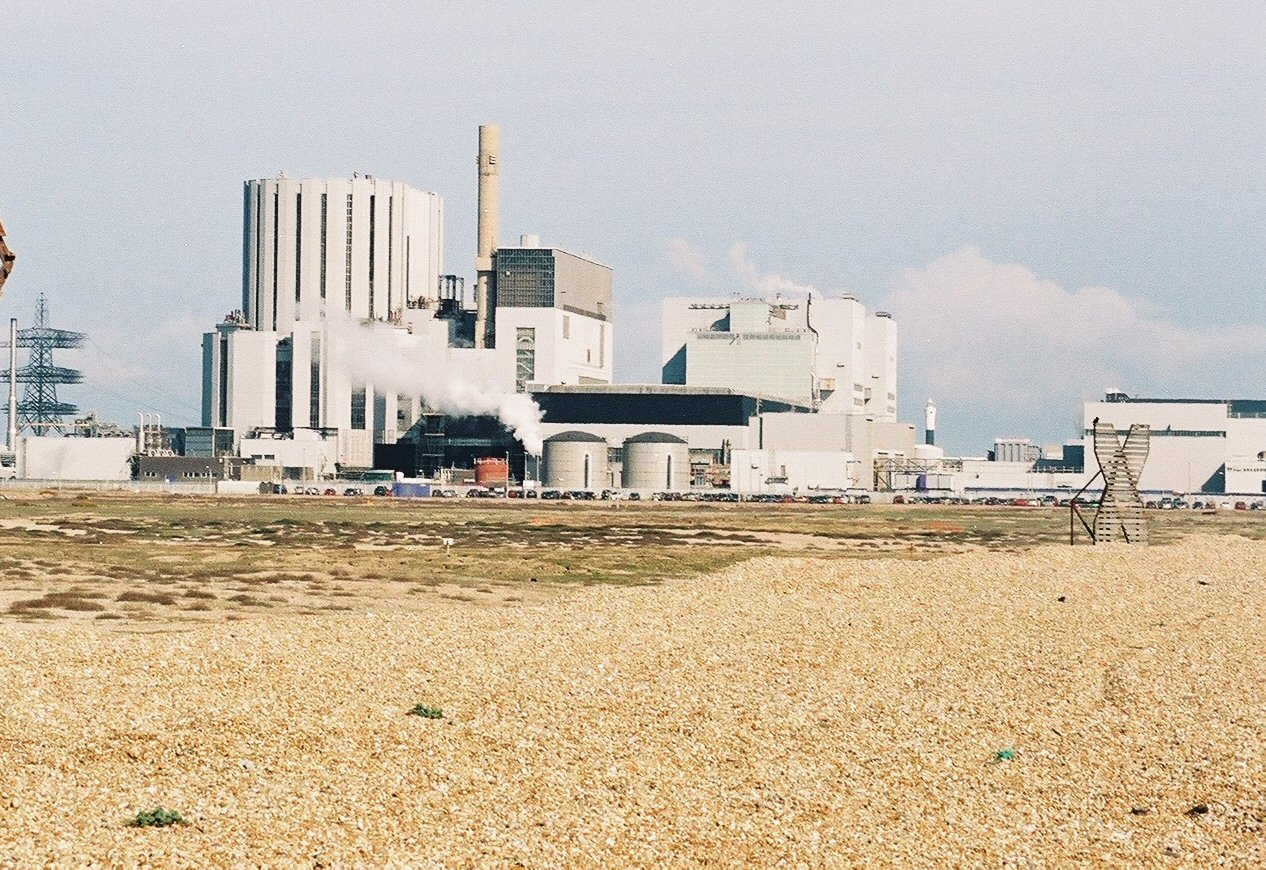
Dungeness B advanced gas-cooled reactor, in 2005 given a ten-year life extension to 2018.

In 2007, British Energy entered into a seven-year partnership agreement with Doosan Babcock Energy to provide technical, engineering and operational support across all British Energy sites. The agreement was at the time held to be potentially worth around £550 million, bringing up to 800 jobs into Scotland and the rest of the UK.

=== Financial difficulties ===
The company faced financial trouble from 2002, when it first approached the British government for financial aid. This followed a slump in wholesale energy prices, a failure to obtain relaxations on the Climate Change Levy, and renegotiations of its back-end fuel costs with BNFL, as well as issues with a number of its reactors (resulting in much capacity being offline during critical periods of the company financial crisis) and a failure to complete a timely sale of its joint-venture share in AmerGen. Parties to the resulting talks included bondholders, significant but unsecured creditors, power purchase agreement counterparties, and a group of secured creditors known as the Eggborough banks; who had provided financing for the purchase of the Eggborough coal-fired power plant in 2000.

The plan that resulted from these talks nearly eliminated any equity interest of existing stockholders; the firm's creditors waived over £1 billion of debts in return for control of the company. Shareholders received only 2.5% of the shares of the new company.

On 22 September 2004 the UK government's investment of over £3 billion in the restructured firm was approved by the European Commission. On 24 September the company was reclassified as a public body in what the Office for National Statistics described as a reflection of "the control that can be exercised by government over British Energy". This move was described by The Times as a de facto nationalisation of the group.

=== Restructuring ===
Under the British Government's restructuring programme the Nuclear Liabilities Fund (NLF) acted as a creditor and liability receiver for British Energy Group. In return, a mechanism was put in place whereby NLF could carry out a cash sweep of the organisation and claim 65% of British Energy's available cash flow each year, on top of a fixed annual contribution. British Energy was allowed to borrow up to £700M under the arrangements, with the NLF providing £275M.

The British Government also assumed British Energy nuclear fuel liabilities worth between £150M and £200M p.a. over ten years. These fuel liabilities extended until 2086.

Despite its financial problems and government help with its fuel liabilities, British Energy's Chief Executive claimed, on 20 June 2006, that nuclear power stations would be economically viable without government guarantee or subsidy if the operation of the energy market was changed.

The British Government's interest in British Energy at this time was managed by the Shareholder Executive on behalf of the Department of Trade and Industry (DTI).

The restructuring of British Energy was subject to three National Audit Office reports; in May 1998, February 2004 and March 2006.

In 2007, the House of Commons Public Accounts Committee reported on the restructuring. They noted that the taxpayer had been left to underwrite large liabilities, revalued at £5.3 billion, while creditors who would have received little on liquidation received bonds and shares worth £3.9 billion in 2006.

=== Disposal of government interest ===
In July 2006, the government announced that they were considering selling part of their interest in British Energy. On 30 May 2007, it was announced that the Secretary of State for Trade and Industry would instruct the Nuclear Liabilities Fund to sell up to approximately 450 million shares, representing around 28% of the Fund's interest in British Energy. The Fund's cash sweep percentage would be reduced from around 64% to approximately 36% following the sale. Revenue from the sale was used to diversify the Nuclear Liabilities Fund's assets.

=== Acquisition by EDF ===
On 24 September 2008, it was announced that Électricité de France (EDF), the state owned French energy company, had agreed a takeover of the company, paying £12.5 billion. Centrica purchased a 20% share of British Energy from EDF in August 2009.

On 1 April 2010, EDF transferred the coal-fired Eggborough power station to the plant's bondholders as per an earlier agreement, and in compliance with commitments made to the European Commission when agreeing the acquisition of British Energy.

== Operations ==
At the time of the EDF acquisition, British Energy operated the following power stations:

Power Station	Type	Net MWe	Construction started	Connected to grid	Full operation	Accounting closure date
Dungeness B	AGR	1,110	1965	1983	1985	2018
Eggborough	Coal	1,960	1960	1967	1970	–
Hartlepool	AGR	1,210	1968	1983	1989	2019
Heysham 1	AGR	1,150	1970	1983	1989	2019
Heysham 2	AGR	1,250	1980	1988	1989	2023
Hinkley Point B	AGR	1,220	1967	1976	1976	2023
Hunterston B	AGR	1,190	1967	1976	1976	2023
Sizewell B	PWR	1,188	1988	1995	1995	2035
Torness	AGR	1,250	1980	1988	1988	2023

In 2005, British Energy announced a ten-year life extension at Dungeness B, that would see the station continue operating until 2018, and in 2007 announced a five-year life extension of Hinkley Point B and Hunterston B until 2016.

Following an outage in 2006 when an increase in creep-induced defect in boiler tubes was observed, Hinkley Point B and Hunterston B were restricted to about 70% of normal output from 2007 and operated at reduced boiler outlet temperatures. After recovery, operation at 80% of the nominal output was allowed.

In December 2009, it was announced that new stations would be built at existing land owned around Sizewell and Hinkley Point stations. Dungeness was considered but was thought to be a poor choice for a new build.

== See also ==
- Nuclear power in the United Kingdom
- Energy use and conservation in the United Kingdom
- List of companies based in London
