= Heysham nuclear power station =

Nuclear power plant located Heysham, Lancashire, England

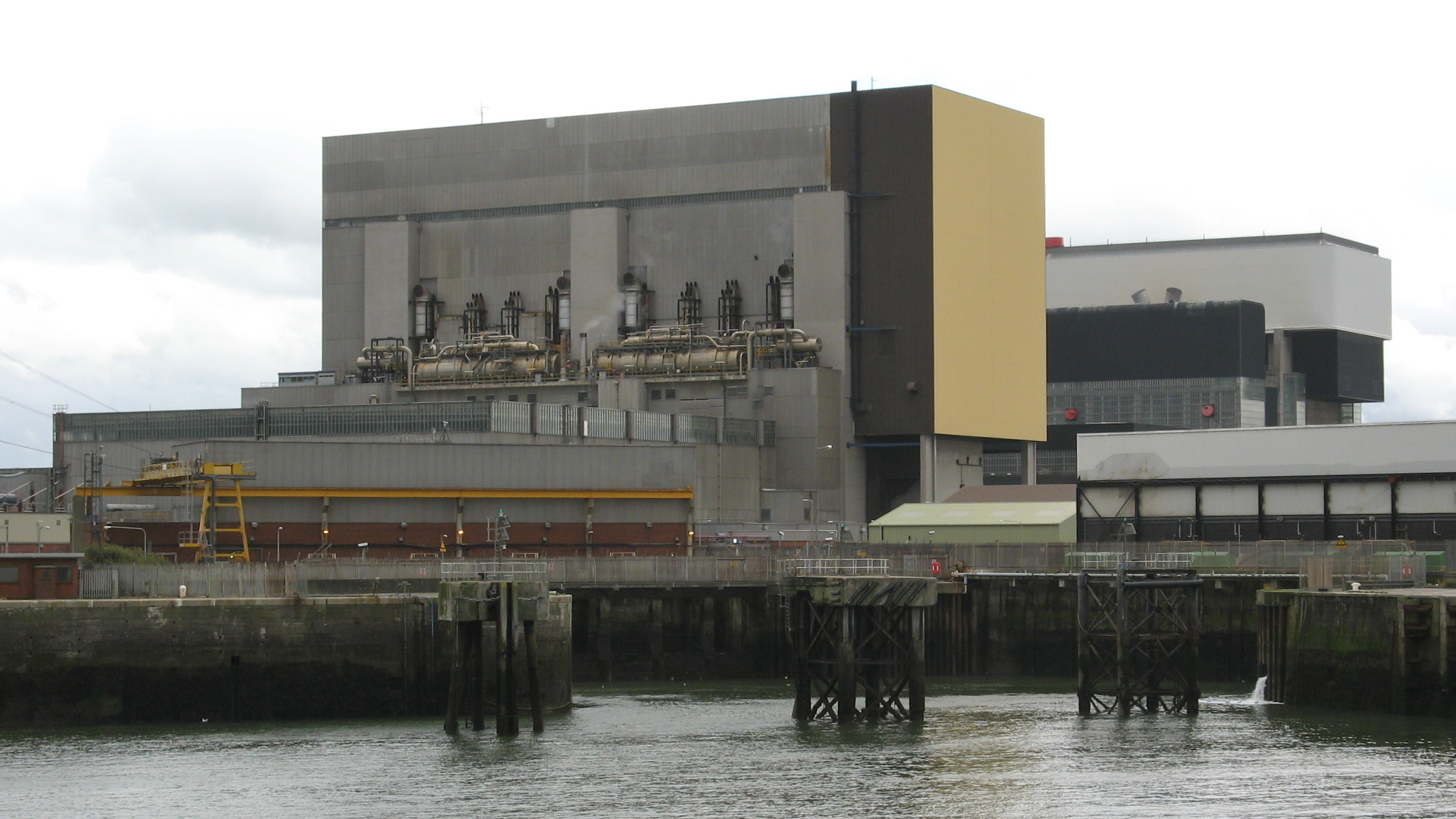
- Heysham 1 & 2
- Country: England
- Location: Heysham, Lancashire
- Coordinates: 54°1′44″N 2°54′58″W
- Status: Operational
- Construction began: Unit A-1: 1 December 1970; Unit A-2: 1 December 1970; Unit B-1: 1 August 1980; Unit B-2: 1 August 1980
- Commission date: Unit A-1: 9 July 1983; Unit A-2: 11 October 1984; Unit B-1: 12 July 1988; Unit B-2: 11 November 1988
- Decommission date: Heysham 1: March 2030; Heysham 2: March 2030; (planned)
- Owner: EDF Energy
- Operator: EDF Energy

Nuclear power station
- Reactors: 4 (Units A-1 and A-2 in Heysham 1, Units B-1 and B-2 in Heysham 2)
- Reactor type: GCR - AGR

Thermal power station
- Primary fuel: Uranium dioxide
- Cooling source: Carbon dioxide
- Thermal capacity: 2 × 1500 MW_{t} (Heysham 1); 2 × 1550 MW_{t} (Heysham 2)

Power generation
- Units operational: 1 × 485 MW_{e} (Unit A-1 in Heysham 1); 1 × 575 MW_{e} (Unit A-2 in Heysham 1); 2 × 620 MW_{e} (Heysham 2)
- Nameplate capacity: 2,452 MW_{e} (Total)
- Capacity factor: Lifetime: (As of the end of 2021); Unit A-1: 67.2%; Unit A-2: 66.3%; Unit B-1: 78.1%; Unit B-2: 77.4%
- Annual net output: 2021: 5,760.93 GWh (20,739.3 TJ) (Heysham 1); 5,787.26 GWh (20,834.1 TJ) (Heysham 2); 11,548.19 GWh (41,573.5 TJ) (Total)

External links
- Website: Heysham 1 nuclear power station and visitor centre | EDF; Heysham 2 nuclear power station and visitor centre | EDF
- Commons: Related media on Commons

The Heysham nuclear power stations are operated by EDF Energy in Heysham, Lancashire, England. On the site two separate nuclear power stations, Heysham 1 and Heysham 2 operate independently, only with joint entry protocol, both with two reactors of the advanced gas-cooled reactor (AGR) type.

In 2010, the British government announced that Heysham was one of the eight sites it considered suitable for future nuclear power stations.

On 1 August 2016, Heysham 2's Unit 8 broke the world record for longest continuous operation of a nuclear power reactor without a shutdown. This record-breaking run exceeds the previous record of 894 days set by Pickering Nuclear Generating Station's Unit 7 (Lake Ontario, Canada) in 1994. The reactor had generated 13.5 TWh of electricity so far during this continuous operation, taking its lifetime generation to 115.46 TWh.

Heysham 1 will operate until March 2030.

== Heysham 1 ==
Construction of Heysham 1, which was undertaken by British Nuclear Design & Construction (BNDC), a consortium backed of English Electric, Babcock & Wilcox and Taylor Woodrow Construction, began in 1970, with the first reactor commencing operations in 1983 and the second reactor following in 1984. However, initial production levels were low, and full commercial operation was only declared in 1989. It is planned to remain in operation until 2028. Its generating capacity is 1,150 MWe. The reactors were supplied by National Nuclear Corporation and the turbines by GEC. There were four 17.5 MW auxiliary gas turbines on the site, these had been first commissioned in January 1977.

Heysham 1 shares its reactor design with Hartlepool nuclear power station, which introduced the replaceable pod boiler design. The CEGB specified a compact design for the Heysham 1 and Hartlepool power station reactor islands in comparison to the design of the two preceding stations at Hinkley Point B and Hunterston B in order to reduce the capital cost, but this caused expensive construction delays because of restricted access. The Heysham 2 reactor island occupies a much larger footprint than Heysham 1 for a similar design output of power.

In 2013, a defect was found by a regular inspection in one of the eight pod boilers of unit 1. The reactor resumed operation at a lower output level with the defective pod boiler disabled, until June 2014 when more detailed inspections confirmed a crack in the boiler spine. As a precaution, unit 2 and the sister Hartlepool nuclear power station were also shut down for inspection.

Heysham 1 was scheduled to be shut down for defueling and then decommissioning in March 2024. EDF subsequently announced plans to extend the life of Heysham 1 and Hartlepool to March 2026. In December 2024, EDF further extended the life of Heysham 1 until March 2027. In September 2025, following an inspection of the graphite cores, EDF announced a further one year extension to March 2028.

== Heysham 2 ==
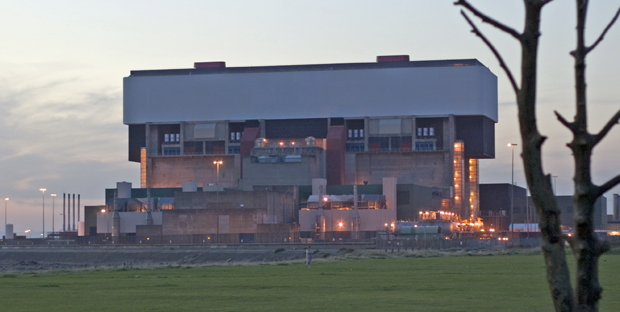
Heysham 2

The construction, which was undertaken by a consortium known as National Nuclear Corporation (NNC), began in 1979 and the station opened in 1988. Its generating capacity is 1,250 MWe. Heysham 2 shares its reactor design with Torness nuclear power station near Dunbar in East Lothian, and is a development of the reactor design used at Hinkley Point B in Somerset. The reactors were supplied by NNC, the turbines and boilers by NEI.

On 15 August 2019, Reactor 8 inside Heysham 2 let off a large amount of steam, with banging noises at approximately 11 pm that could be heard 7 miles (11 km) away in Lancaster. This caused alarm among local residents, and numerous calls to the police reporting “gunshots”. EDF later reported that a reactor had earlier experienced a "non-planned shutdown after an electrical fault", and the noise was from the re-start process when unsilenced relief valves lifted on the Startup Vessels during boiler feeding.

In December 2024, EDF announced that Heysham 2 would continue producing electricity until March 2030 in response to concerns over energy security following delays to the opening of Hinkley Point C.

== See also ==
- Nuclear power in the United Kingdom
- Energy policy of the United Kingdom
- Energy use and conservation in the United Kingdom
