= Nuclear power in Scotland =

Scotland has a long history of nuclear research and electricity generation. Work started on the Dounreay reactor in 1955.

Nuclear power generation in Scotland
Year	TWh	Share
2004	18.83	37.71%
2005	19.67	39.68%
2006	14.91	28.77%
2007	13.14	27.58%
2008	15.86	31.91%
2009	16.68	32.71%
2010	15.29	30.93%
2011	16.89	33.21%
2012	17.05	33.87%
2013	18.50	34.89%
2014	16.63	33.24%
2015	17.76	34.60%
2016	19.63	42.97%
2017	17.83	36.50%
2018	13.61	27.96%
2019	12.23	24.65%
2020	13.46	25.96%
2021	14.47	30.30%
2022	7.94	15.79%

Four other sites provided electricity to the National Grid in Scotland, however generation ceased at Hunterson A in 1990 and at Chapelcross in 2004. Between 2004 and 2021, nuclear energy accounted for 25–43% of the annual electricity generation in Scotland. As of 2022, there is only one remaining operating nuclear power station in Scotland (Torness).

The Scottish National Party (SNP) government elected in 2007 had a 'no new nuclear power strategy'. This position is at odds with UK government policy which in January 2008 announced the go-ahead for new nuclear power stations to be built across the United Kingdom. In response, Scotland's then First Minister Alex Salmond commented there was 'no chance' of new nuclear power stations being built in Scotland. The Parliament voted 63–58 to support the policy of opposing new nuclear power stations, taking advantage of a loophole which permits a veto on planning, despite lacking authority over the UK energy policy. Others support nuclear as part of a sustainable, clean energy policy.

== Nuclear reactors in Scotland ==
=== Power station reactors ===
- Chapelcross, Dumfries and Galloway (Generation ceased 2004)
- Hunterston A, North Ayrshire (Generation ceased 1990)
- Hunterston B, North Ayrshire – EDF Energy owned AGR (Generation ceased 2022)
- Torness, East Lothian – EDF Energy owned AGR (Scheduled for shut down in 2030)

=== Research reactors ===
- Dounreay
  - VULCAN (Rolls-Royce Naval Marine) (decommissioned in 1992)
  - PWR2 (Rolls-Royce Naval Marine) – (shut down 2015)
  - DMTR – (shut down 1969)
  - Dounreay Fast Reactor – Fast breeder reactor (shut down 1977)
  - Prototype fast reactor – (shut down 1994)
- East Kilbride – Scottish Universities Research and Reactor Centre (100 kW Argonaut class reactor deactivated 1995, fully dismantled 2003)

=== Nuclear-powered vessels ===
HMNB Clyde (Faslane) is the homeport of the nuclear-powered submarines of the Vanguard and Astute classes:

- HMS Vanguard
- HMS Victorious
- HMS Vigilant
- HMS Vengeance
- HMS Astute
- HMS Ambush
- HMS Artful
- HMS Audacious
- HMS Anson

As of 2007 seven nuclear-powered submarines were stored at Rosyth Dockyard after decommissioning and the removal of their fuel:

- HMS Churchill
- HMS Dreadnought
- HMS Resolution
- HMS Repulse
- HMS Renown
- HMS Revenge
- HMS Swiftsure

== Public opinion ==
In 2013, a YouGov energy survey concluded that:

New YouGov research for Scottish Renewables shows Scots are twice as likely to favour wind power over nuclear or shale gas. Over six in ten (62%) people in Scotland say they would support large scale wind projects in their local area, more than double the number who said they would be generally for shale gas (24%) and almost twice as much as nuclear (32%). Hydro power is the most popular energy source for large scale projects in Scotland, with an overwhelming majority (80%) being in favour.

— YouGov

By 2020, an IMechE survey found that support for nuclear had increased to 49% in favour.

== See also ==
- Nuclear power in the United Kingdom
- Economy of Scotland
- Renewable energy in Scotland
- List of Scotland-related topics
