= Hartlepool nuclear power station =

Nuclear power station in Hartlepool, England

Hartlepool Nuclear Power Station
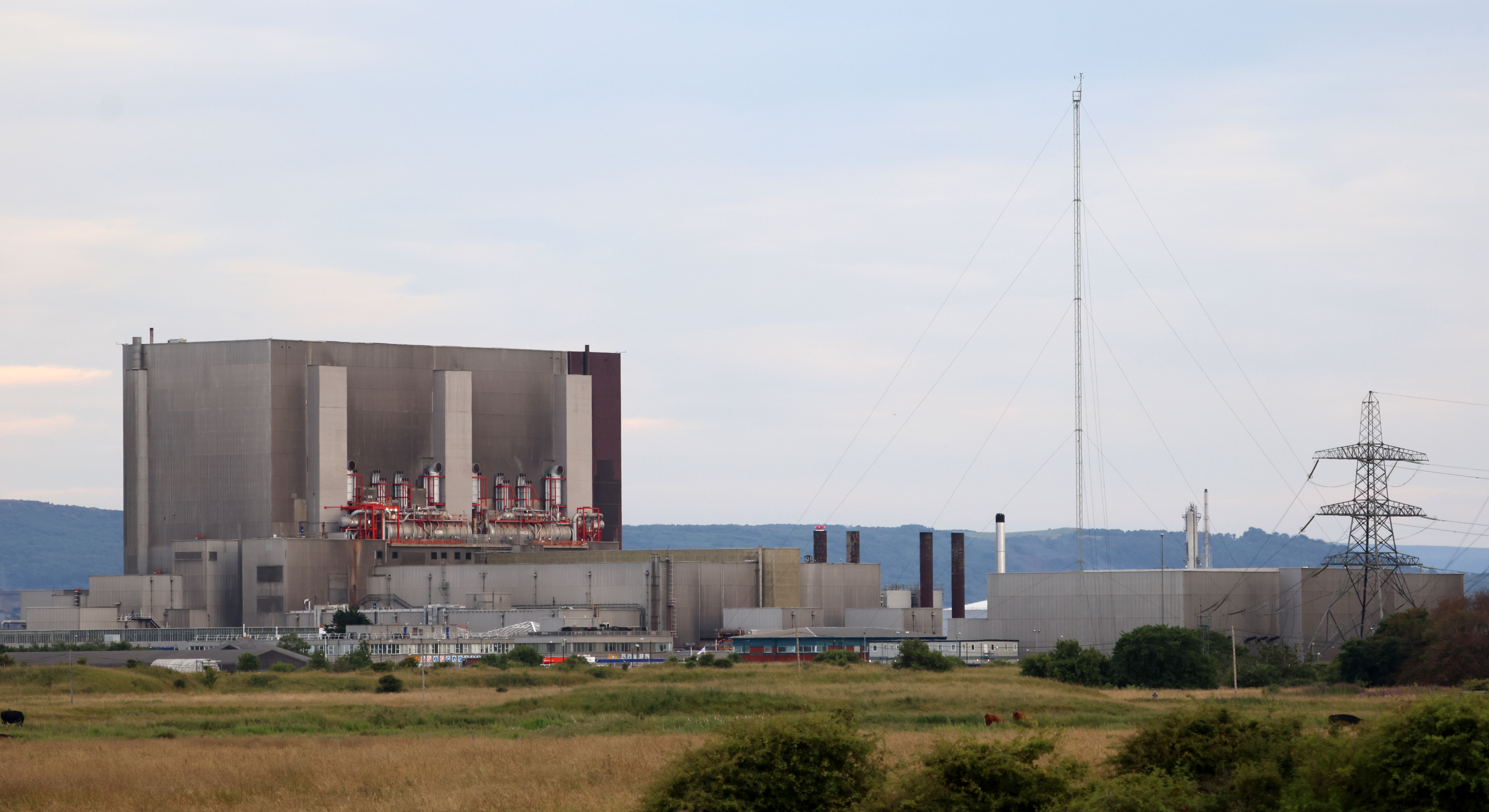
- Hartlepool nuclear power station Viewed from the north in July 2022
- Country: England, United Kingdom
- Location: Hartlepool, County Durham
- Coordinates: 54°38′6″N 1°10′51″W
- Status: Operational
- Construction began: Unit 1: 1 October 1968; Unit 2: 1 October 1968
- Commission date: Unit 1: 1 August 1983; Unit 2: 31 October 1984
- Decommission date: Expected to begin March 2030
- Owners: Central Electricity Generating Board (1983–1990); Nuclear Electric (1990–1996); British Energy (1996–2009); EDF Energy (2009–present)
- Operator: EDF Energy

Nuclear power station
- Reactor type: GCR – AGR
- Reactor supplier: National Nuclear Corporation
- Cooling source: Carbon Dioxide
- Thermal capacity: 2 x 1500 MW_{th}

Power generation
- Units operational: 1 x 590 MW_{e}; 1 x 595 MW_{e}
- Make and model: General Electric Company
- Nameplate capacity: 1,185 MW_{e}
- Capacity factor: Lifetime: (Up to 2021); Unit 1: 68.4%; Unit 2: 70.0%
- Annual net output: 5,710.75 GWh (20,558.7 TJ) (2021)

External links
- Website: Hartlepool nuclear power station and visitor centre | EDF
- Commons: Related media on Commons

Hartlepool nuclear power station is a nuclear power station situated on the northern bank of the mouth of the River Tees, 2.5 mi (4 kilometres) south of Hartlepool in County Durham, North East England. The station has a net electrical output of 1,185 megawatts, which is 2% of Great Britain's peak electricity demand of 60 GW. Electricity is produced through the use of two advanced gas-cooled reactors (AGR). Hartlepool was only the third nuclear power station in the United Kingdom to use AGR technology. It was also the first nuclear power station to be built close to a major urban area.

Originally planned in 1967, with construction starting in 1969, the station started generating electricity in 1983 and was completed in 1985, initially being operated by the Central Electricity Generating Board. With privatisation of the UK's electric supply industry in 1990, the station has been owned by Nuclear Electric and British Energy but is now owned and operated by EDF Energy.

The power station is planned to operate until March 2030.

== History ==
After building the first operational advanced gas-cooled reactor (AGR) nuclear power station at Dungeness, the Central Electricity Generating Board (CEGB) proposed that their third AGR station in 1967 be situated on the edge of the Durham coalfield, near the seaside resort of Seaton Carew. The proposal came at a time when the CEGB's move toward fuels alternative to coal threatened the existence of the coal industry. Despite that, and a short ministerial delay, the plans for the Seaton Carew station (which became known as Hartlepool nuclear power station) went ahead. Because the construction of the station was given the go ahead, the National Coal Board were not able to get the CEGB behind the plans for a prototype fluidised bed combustion (FBC) coal station at Grimethorpe in Yorkshire. Because of that the UK did not build FBC technology.

Sited 1.65 mi (2.66 km) from Seaton Carew and in the middle of the industrial complex of Teesside, the station was to be built closer to any major urban area than any nuclear power station site had been. To make that acceptable, the station's reactors were to be housed in pressure vessels made from prestressed concrete.

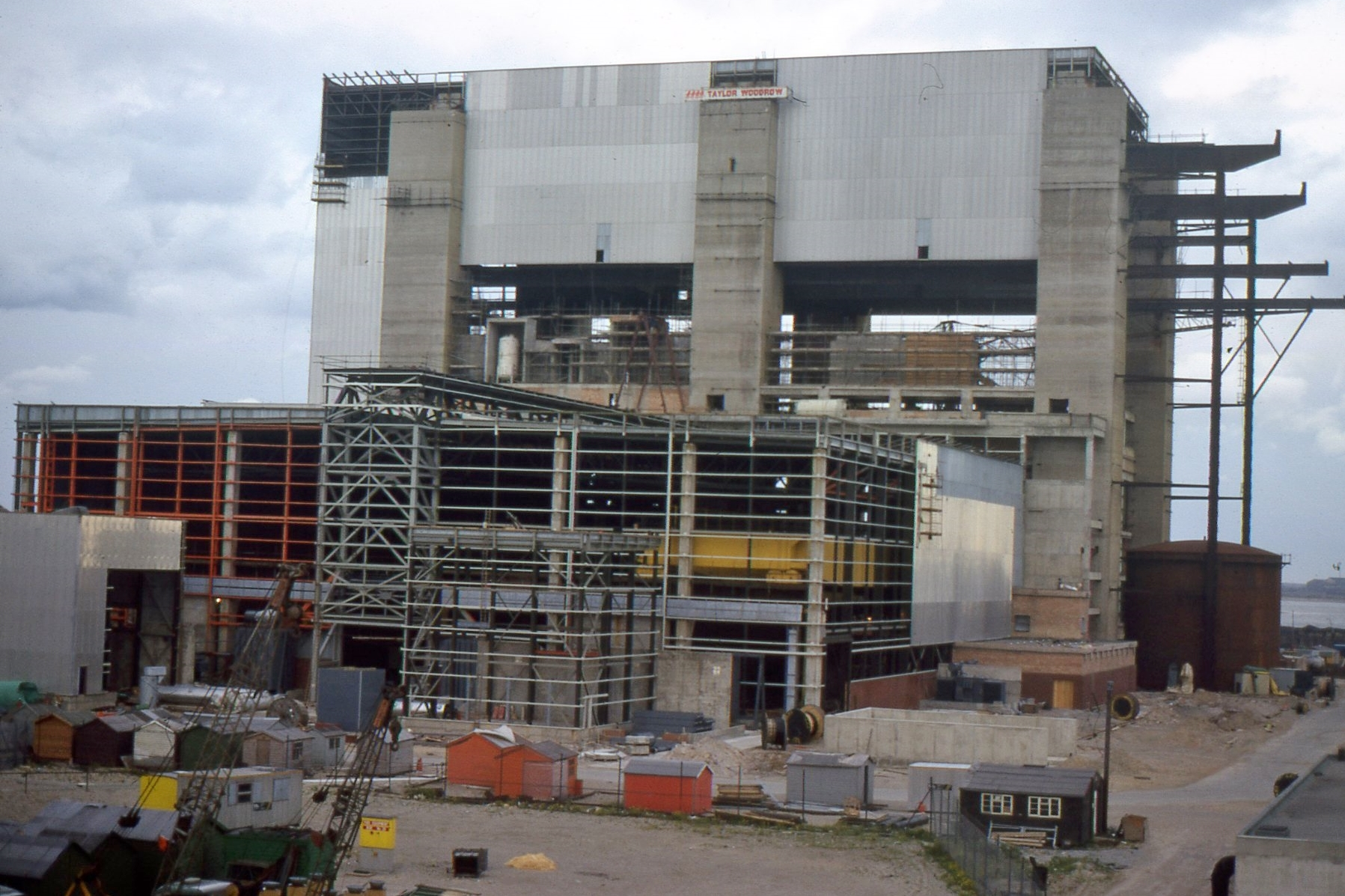
The station under construction in June 1972

The construction of the power station, which was undertaken by Nuclear Design & Construction ('NDC'), a consortium backed by English Electric, Babcock International Group and Taylor Woodrow Construction, began in 1969.

Construction was delayed in 1970, when the Nuclear Installations Inspectorate declared that they were unhappy with part of the station's boiler design, setting the CEGB back £25 million. The station's reactors were supplied by the National Nuclear Corporation, and its generating sets by the General Electric Company. The first of the station's two units were commissioned in 1983, the other in 1985. The station first generated electricity commercially on 1 August 1983.

Nuclear fuel for Hartlepool power station is delivered and removed via a loading/unloading facility on a 1.5-mile (2.4 km) branch from the Durham Coast Line.

=== Visitor centre ===
In the 1980s, there was an interactive visitor centre on site. There was also an activity centre for school visits which hosted a number of special events. Tours of the power station itself also took place. The centre was closed after privatisation in the 1990s, but a new visitor centre was opened by current operators EDF Energy in 2013.

This centre also hosts 'Crucial Crew' events for school pupils in the local areas. These experiences teach children about health and safety.

=== 2013 turbine fire ===
At 19:18 on 20 April 2013, a small fire broke out in the turbine hall of Unit 2 at the power station while Reactor 2 was being brought back online. The fire was caused by an oil leak, and ignited lagging surrounding part of the turbine. Reactor 2 was shut down and cooled, mitigating any threat of nuclear contamination. Emergency services attended the fire from stations across the Cleveland area and the fire was extinguished at 19:53. During the incident, fire cover in the Cleveland area was provided by units from Darlington and County Durham.

=== Ball release ===
In 2023 and 2026, Taprogge balls used to clean the power station's cooling systems were released and appeared on beaches across Teesside. Power station operator EDF said the balls are biodegradable and releases were being reduced, but any found balls should be reported to the company or the Environment Agency.

== Specification ==
The station is of the advanced gas-cooled reactor (AGR) type. It provides electricity for over 3% of the UK using two 1,575 MWth advanced gas-cooled reactors to power two generators (590 MW_{e} + 595 MW_{e}), giving a maximum generating capacity of 1,320 MW. The station's designed net electrical output is 1,185 MW. This is enough electricity to power 1.5 million homes. There are four 17.5 MW auxiliary gas turbines on the site, these had first been commissioned in October 1973.

== Future of the station ==
The power station was originally expected to shut down in 2009, but was given permission by the Nuclear Installations Inspectorate (NII) for an extension of five years in 2007, meaning that it could continue to generate until 2014. In 2010, the lifetime was further extended by another five years, so that generation could continue until 2019. The company then began work to extend station lifetime to 2024 and beyond, and an announcement was made in November 2013 that the plant would have a further extension to its operating life of 5 years taking the expected decommissioning date to 2024. The 2024 closure was reaffirmed in 2022. An announcement was made in March 2023 that the plant would have an additional extension to its life of two years, taking the expected decommissioning date to March 2026. In December 2024, in response to concerns over energy security following delays to Hinkley Point C, EDF announced a further one year extension in Hartlepool production until March 2027. In September 2025, following an inspection of the graphite cores, EDF announced a further one year extension to March 2028. In July 2026, after a detailed review of the condition of the boilers and graphite cores, EDF announced a further two year extension to March 2030.

Closing the station would reduce the available reactive power in the local grid by 200 MVAr.

=== New station ===
In July 2008, the plant's then-operator British Energy, suggested that the site would be a good location for a replacement nuclear power station. Then a year later in July 2009, the UK government named Hartlepool on a list of eleven sites in England and Wales, where new nuclear power stations could be built. On 9 November 2009, the government announced that ten of these sites, including Hartlepool, had been given the go-ahead for the construction of new reactors. The proposed station would have use reactors capable of generating 1,800 MW each. It would have cost between £5 billion and £6 billion to construct, would employ up to 3,000 construction workers for the possible eight-year construction period, as well as providing 600 full-time jobs once completed. The new station had an anticipated operating life of 60 years.

The plans were opposed by environmental groups such as Friends of the Earth and Stop New Nuclear.

== See also ==
- Nuclear power in the United Kingdom
- Energy policy of the United Kingdom
- Energy use and conservation in the United Kingdom
