= Nuclear Electric =

UK nuclear power generation company

- Industry: Electricity generation
- Founded: 1990
- Defunct: 1995
- Fate: Amalgamated into British Energy
- Successor: EDF Energy
- Headquarters: London, United Kingdom
- Products: Electrical power

Nuclear Electric was a nuclear power generation company in the United Kingdom. It was formed in 1990 as part of the privatisation process of the UK Electricity Supply Industry.

In 1996, it was amalgamated into a new company – British Energy, which was eventually purchased by EDF Energy in 2010.

== History ==
=== Background (before 1990) ===
Before 1990, the generation and transmission activities in England and Wales were under the responsibility of Central Electricity Generating Board (CEGB). The present electricity market in the UK was built upon the break-up of the CEGB into four separate companies in the 1990s. Its generation (or upstream) activities were transferred to three generating companies – PowerGen, National Power, and Nuclear Electric (later British Energy, eventually 'EDF Energy'); and its transmission (or downstream) activities to – the National Grid Company.

=== Nuclear Electric (1990–1995) ===
When the CEGB split up was announced, its power stations were decided to be divided between PowerGen and National Power. The nuclear stations, Magnox, AGR and the then under construction Sizewell B (PWR), were allocated to National Power in their nuclear division. However, the privatisation process in National Power was delayed as it was concluded that the 'earlier decided nuclear power plant assets in National Power' would not be included in the private company – 'National Power'

A new company was formed, Nuclear Electric, which would eventually own and operate the nuclear power assets; and the nuclear power stations were held in public ownership for a number of years.

John G. Collier, formerly chair of UKAEA, was its first chairman, and its corporate headquarters were at Barnwood, formerly the site of the Generation Design and Construction Division of the CEGB.

=== Transition to British Energy, later EDF Energy (1995–2010) ===
In 1995, the assets of Nuclear Electric and Scottish Nuclear were combined as well as split. The combination process merged operations of the UK's eight most advanced nuclear plants – seven advanced gas-cooled reactors (AGR) and one pressurised water reactor (PWR) – into a new private company founded in 1996, British Energy.

The splitting process created a separate company in 1996 called Magnox Electric – which would hold a proportion of the old CEGB's nuclear stations, its older Magnox reactors. The assets of Magnox Electric were later combined with BNFL in 1998, and eventually operated and managed by US based EnergySolutions through its June 2007 acquisition of the BNFL subsidiary – Reactor Sites Management Company.

In 2009, British Energy was acquired by Électricité de France (EDF); and on 1 July 2010, British Energy was rebranded to EDF Energy.

== See also ==
- Nuclear power in the United Kingdom
- Privatisation of Central Electricity Generating Board
