= Nuclear Restoration Services =

British nuclear decommissioning company

Nuclear Restoration Services Ltd
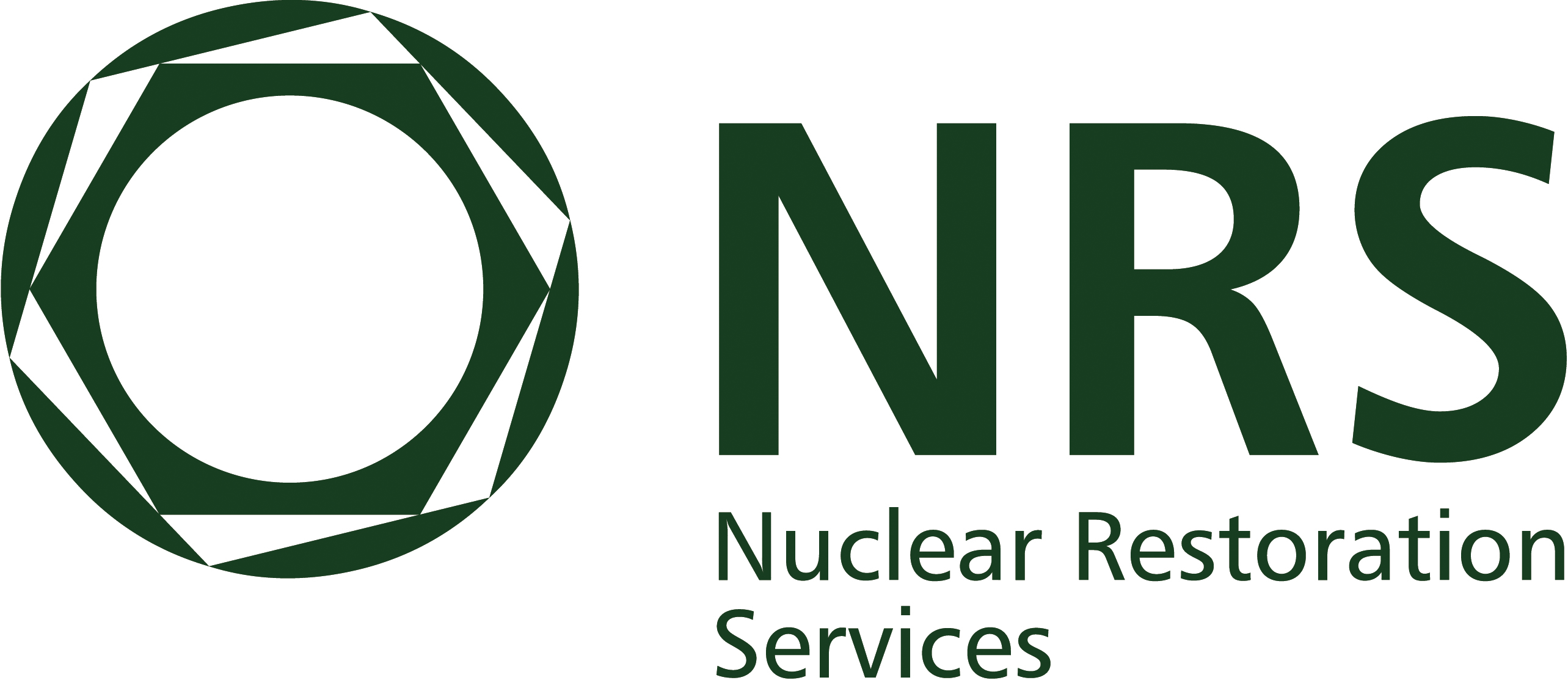
- Type: Private limited company
- Industry: Nuclear decommissioning
- Predecessor: Magnox Ltd; Dounreay Site Restoration Limited
- Founded: 2023 (Magnox Rebrand); 2024 (Legal Company)
- Headquarters: Birchwood, Warrington, England
- Number of locations: 13 nuclear sites
- Area served: United Kingdom
- Key people: Rob Fletcher, CEO
- Owner: Nuclear Decommissioning Authority
- Divisions: NRS Dounreay
- Website: www.gov.uk/government/organisations/nuclear-restoration-services

Nuclear Restoration Services (NRS) is a British nuclear decommissioning Site Licence Company (SLC) owned by the Nuclear Decommissioning Authority (NDA).

It is responsible for the decommissioning of several first-generation nuclear power generation and research sites across the UK, and the operation of a hydro-electric plant.

== History ==
NRS was created as part of re-structuring of the NDA Estate, which saw Dounreay join with Magnox Ltd in April 2023. In the future, NRS is expecting to assume control of decommissioning of seven Advanced Gas-cooled Reactor sites (AGRs), currently managed by EDF Energy.

=== Magnox Electric plc ===
Magnox Electric plc was created in 1996 to take ownership of the Magnox assets from Nuclear Electric and Scottish Nuclear. The remaining nuclear power stations of these two companies, seven advanced gas-cooled reactor (AGR) sites and one pressurised water reactor (PWR) site, were transferred to a separate company, British Energy, which was then privatised in 1996. In January 1998, Magnox Electric came under the control of another government-owned company, British Nuclear Fuels Ltd, operating as BNFL Magnox Generation.

Following a wider reorganisation of the UK nuclear industry in 2005, ownership of BNFL's Magnox sites transferred to the newly created Nuclear Decommissioning Authority (NDA) and Magnox was reorganised to a private limited company.

BNFL created a new subsidiary, Reactor Sites Management Company (RSMC), to manage and operate Magnox Electric on behalf of the NDA. In June 2007, BNFL sold RSMC to the newly formed US company EnergySolutions; and transferred operational and management responsibilities of Magnox sites to the US company.

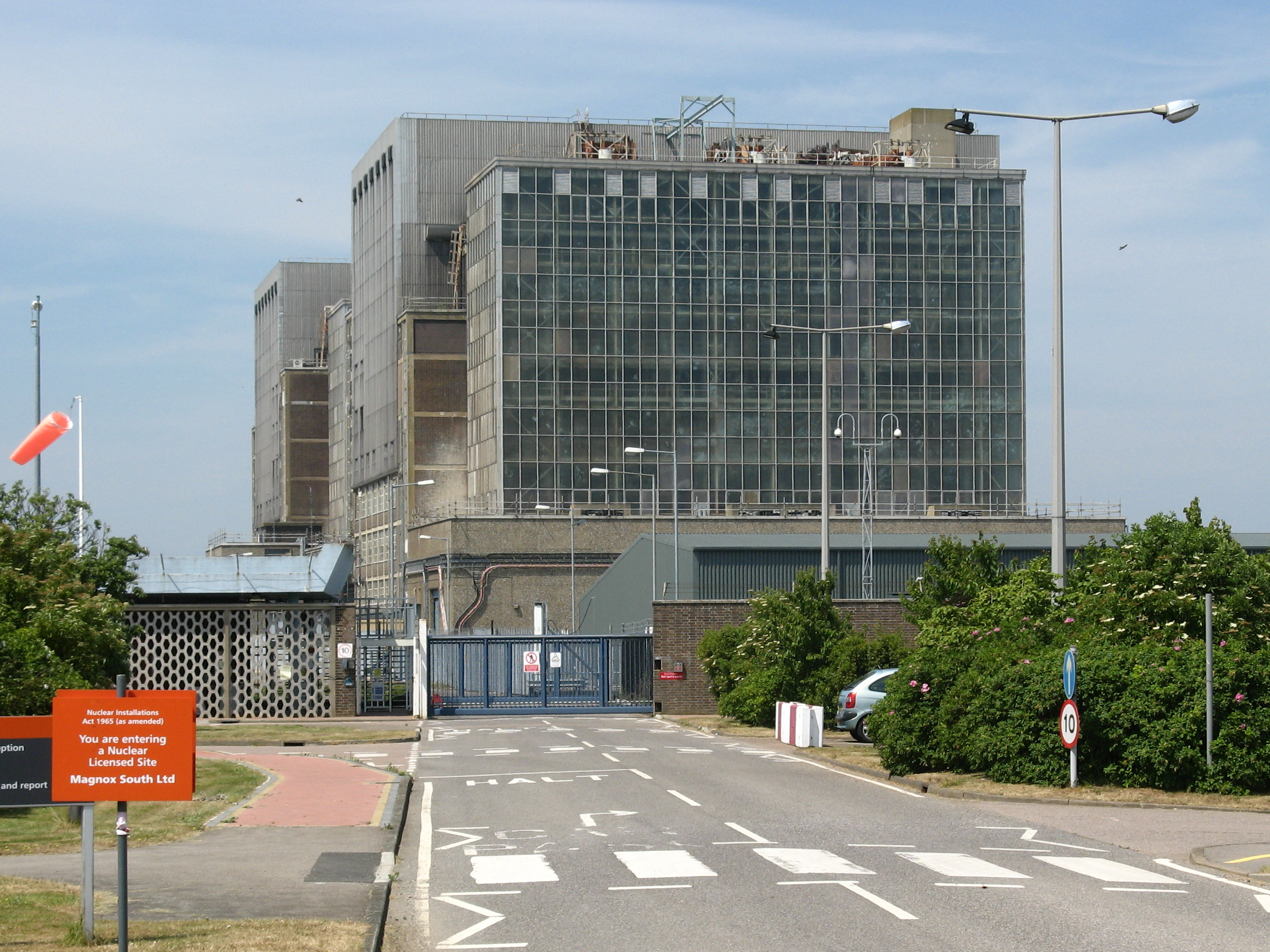
Bradwell nuclear power station while under the control of Magnox South

On 1 October 2008, Magnox Electric was split into two companies based on the locations of the sites. Magnox North Ltd became the operator of Chapelcross, Hunterston A, Oldbury, Trawsfynydd and Wylfa. Magnox South Ltd became and operator of Berkeley, Bradwell, Dungeness, Hinkley Point A and Sizewell A. Both companies continued to be managed by RSMC.

=== Magnox Ltd ===
Magnox logo

In January 2011, to reduce costs and to help extend best practices across all sites, it was decided to reverse the split with Magnox North and Magnox South recombining as Magnox Ltd. Magnox Ltd was formed in 2011 as a wholly owned subsidiary of the Nuclear Decommissioning Authority (NDA), responsible for the safe decommissioning of 12 British nuclear sites. Originally created for the management of Magnox nuclear reactors, it went through various forms of organisation throughout privatisation of the nuclear industry. It was operated by the 'Cavendish Fluor Partnership' from 2014 until the early termination of that contract in 2019, when ownership was transferred to the NDA.

In 2015, the Harwell and Winfrith sites managed by Research Sites Restoration Limited (RSRL) were brought under the management of Magnox Ltd.

In 2017, the NDA decided to terminate the contract with Cavendish Fluor Partnership believing a simplified approach would provide a more efficient decommissioning programme. Magnox Ltd became a subsidiary of the NDA on 3 September 2019.

In February 2018, the UK parliament's Public Accounts Committee (PAC) concluded that the NDA had "dramatically under-estimated" costs and "completely failed" in the procurement and management of the contract, which was one of the highest value contracts let by the government. An independent inquiry into the deal was set up.

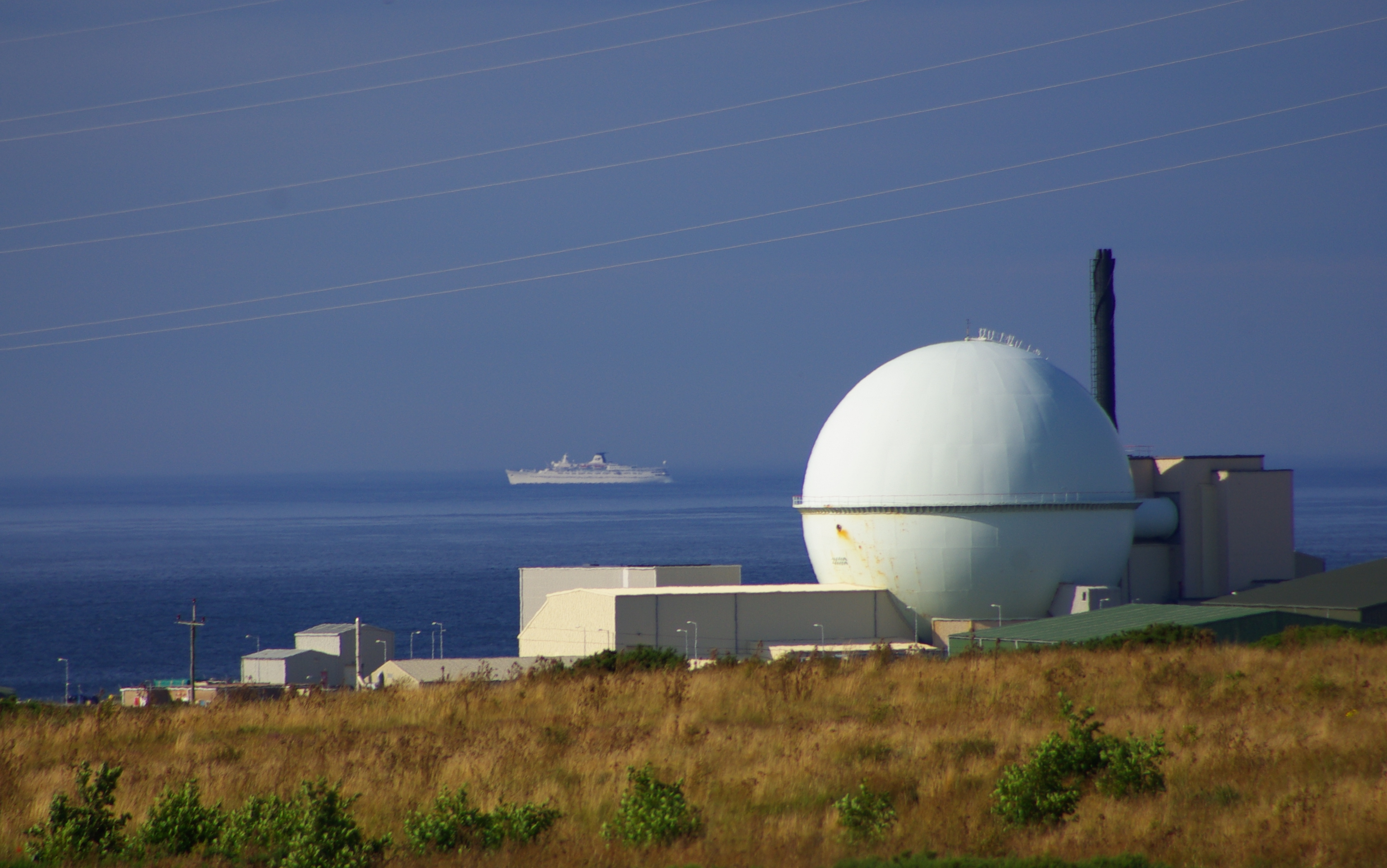
NRS Dounreay

==== Operations ====
Magnox was responsible for the decommissioning of ten Magnox nuclear power stations and two former research facilities in the United Kingdom. The 12 sites were located at Berkeley, Bradwell, Chapelcross, Dungeness A, Hinkley Point A, Hunterston A, Oldbury, Sizewell A, Trawsfynydd, Wylfa, Harwell and Winfrith. All the sites have ceased production.

In addition, as part of the Trawsfynydd unit, Magnox Ltd generated hydro-electric power at Maentwrog power station. The only Magnox power station in the United Kingdom not managed by Magnox Ltd is Calder Hall, which is part of the Sellafield site and is controlled by Sellafield Ltd.

=== Dounreay Site Restoration Limited (DSRL) ===
DSRL was the site licence company for the Dounreay nuclear site. It was responsible for decommissioning the site, which includes former research facilities; nuclear fuel fabrication and reprocessing plants, and three nuclear reactors (two of which exported power to the national grid).

DSRL was formed in 2008, and from 2012 onwards was owned by a consortium of Parent Body Organisation (PBO) companies led by Babcock. In 2021 ownership was transferred to the NDA, and the company ceased to exist in 2023 as Dounreay joined Magnox Ltd.

=== Restructuring ===
In March 2023, it was announced that CEO Gwen Parry-Jones was to take up a position at Great British Nuclear, with Rob Fletcher appointed as interim CEO of Magnox Ltd.

Following restructuring of the estate, which saw Dounreay join Magnox, Magnox rebranded as Nuclear Restoration Services (NRS) in October 2023. In October 2023, Fletcher was appointed as permanent CEO. In April 2023, Dounreay joined Magnox as part of a restructuring of the NDA estate. Subsequently, from 31 October 2023, Magnox Ltd rebranded as Nuclear Restoration Services. In April 2024, the company legally changed to Nuclear Restoration Services Limited.

=== Timeline ===
- 1 April 2023 - Dounreay joins Magnox Ltd
- 31 October 2023 - Magnox rebranded as NRS (Registered company name remains Magnox Ltd)
- 2 April 2024 - Company legally renamed to Nuclear Restoration Services Limited

== Sites ==
Nuclear Restoration Services Sites
Magnox Power Stations
Nuclear Research Sites
Hydroelectric Power Station

NRS is a site licence company with overall responsibility for operating and decommissioning 13 nuclear sites in the UK.

Additionally, it operates a hydro-electric power station.

Nuclear Restoration Services Sites
Magnox Power Stations	Nuclear Research Sites	Hydro-Electric Power Station
Berkeley	Dounreay	Maentwrog
Bradwell	Harwell	
Chapelcross	Winfrith	
Dungeness A		
Hinkley Point A		
Hunterston A		
Oldbury		
Sizewell A		
Trawsfynydd		
Wylfa		

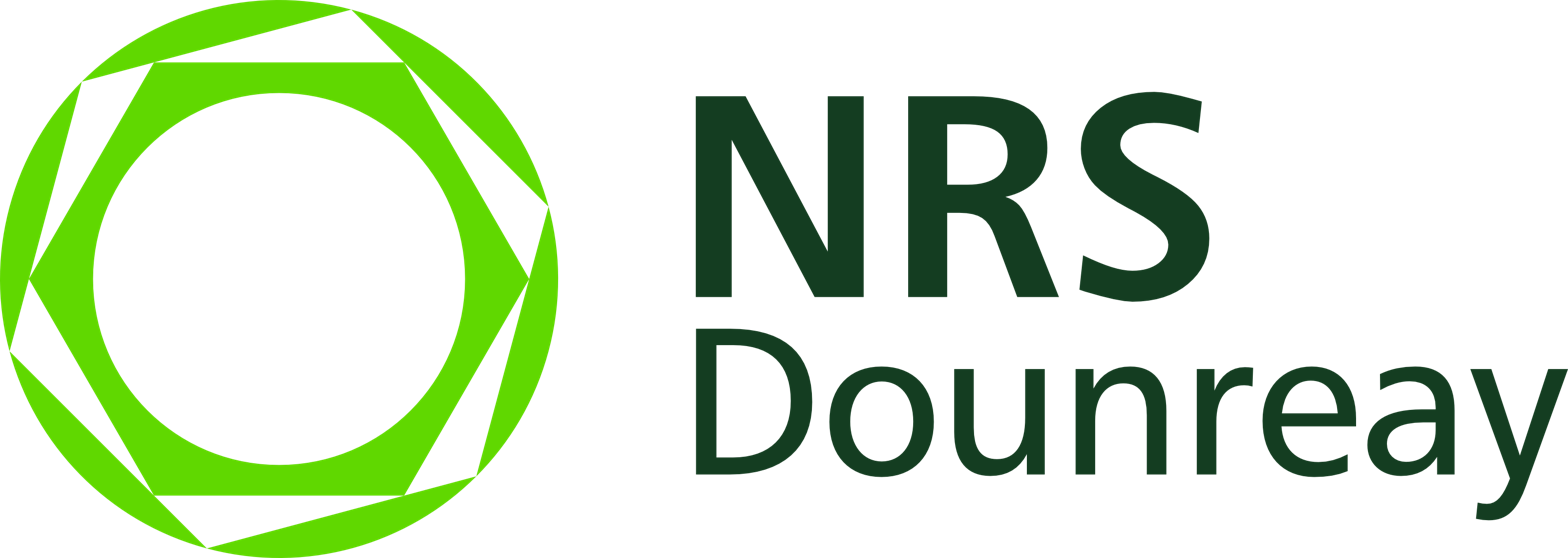
NRS Dounreay Logo

== NRS Dounreay ==
The Dounreay site is operated by a division of NRS, known as NRS Dounreay.

== See also ==
- Nuclear power in the United Kingdom
