= John G. Collier =

British chemical engineer (1935–1995)

John Gordon Collier FRS (22 January 1935 – 18 November 1995) was a British chemical engineer and administrator, particularly associated with nuclear power for electricity production. He started as an apprentice at Harwell United Kingdom Atomic Energy Authority (UKAEA) and rose to become its chairman.

== Life ==
Collier was born on 22 January 1935 in Streatham, London, and went to St Paul's School before joining the UKAEA as an apprentice. He studied part-time for A-levels, then went to University College London where he gained a first class degree in chemical engineering in 1956.

He returned to UKAEA Harwell, and married a secretary from the establishment, Ellen Mitchell (1935–1998), in 1956. They had two children, Clare and John Douglas. He died in Sheepscombe, Gloucestershire on 18 November 1995.

== Work ==
He left the UKAEA in 1962 for employment in the nuclear power industry in Canada and the UK, but returned to head its chemical engineering division in 1966, then became head of safety and reliability. During this time he published a book Convective Boiling and Condensation (1972) which became a standard reference. In 1983 he became director-general of the Central Electricity Generating Board CEGB, but returned to the UKAEA as deputy chairman in 1986 and chairman in 1987. Following the breakup of the CEGB in 1990 he became first chairman of the Barnwood-based Nuclear Electric and was responsible for the creation of Sizewell B, Britain's first Pressurized water reactor.

== Honours ==
He was elected a Fellow of the Royal Academy of Engineering (FREng) in 1988 and a Fellow of the Royal Society (FRS) in 1990, and received honorary doctorates from Cranfield University and the University of Bristol.

In 1995 he took up office as the President of the Institution of Chemical Engineers (IChemE), but died the same year, while still in office. In commemoration, the John Collier medal is awarded biennially jointly by the RAE, Royal Society and IChemE.

== Notable publications ==
- J. G. Collier (1972) Convective Boiling and Condensation (McGraw-Hill, London)
- J. G. Collier and J. R. Thorne (1996) Convective Boiling and Condensation 3rd edition (Oxford University Press)ISBN 978-0-19-856296-2
