= Chapelcross nuclear power station =

Decommissioned nuclear power plant in Scotland

Chapelcross Nuclear Power Station
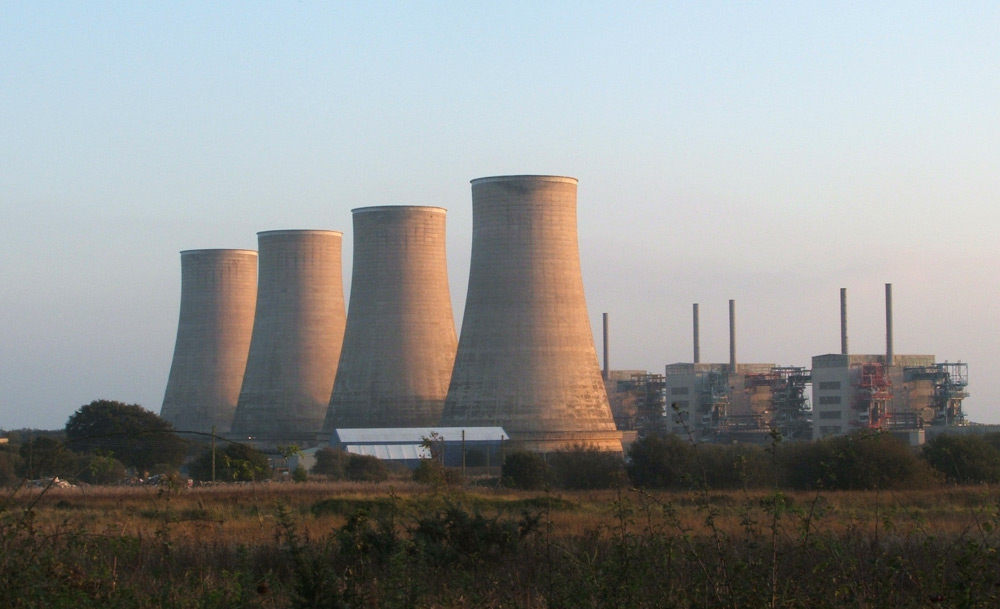
- Chapelcross nuclear power station, prior to demolition of the cooling towers
- Country: Scotland
- Coordinates: 55.0157°N 3.2261°W
- Status: Decommissioning in progress
- Construction began: 1955
- Commission date: 1959
- Decommission date: 2004
- Owner: Nuclear Decommissioning Authority
- Operator: Nuclear Restoration Services

Thermal power station
- Primary fuel: Unenriched Uranium
- Cooling towers: 4 (demolished 2007)

Power generation
- Make and model: C.A. Parsons & Company; UKAEA
- Units decommissioned: 4 x 60 MWe

External links
- Commons: Related media on Commons

Chapelcross nuclear power station is a former Magnox nuclear power station undergoing decommissioning. It is located in Annan in Dumfries and Galloway in southwest Scotland, and was in operation from 1959 to 2004. It was the sister plant to the Calder Hall nuclear power station plant in Cumbria, England; both were commissioned and originally operated by the United Kingdom Atomic Energy Authority. The primary purpose of both plants was to produce weapons-grade plutonium for the UK's nuclear weapons programme, but they also generated electrical power for the National Grid. Later in the reactors' lifecycle, as the UK slowed the development of the nuclear deterrent as the Cold War came to a close, power production became the primary goal of reactor operation.

The site is being decommissioned by Nuclear Decommissioning Authority subsidiary Nuclear Restoration Services. The station's four cooling towers were demolished in 2007. The reactors are spent-fuel free and are currently undergoing dismantlement of primary loop equipment such as heat exchangers and hot gas ducts. Once complete, the reactors will enter a care and maintenance stage to allow radiation levels to decline before the reactors themselves are demolished.

== Location ==
Chapelcross occupies a 92-hectare (230-acre) site on the location of former World War II training airfield, RAF Annan, located 3 km (1.9 miles) north east of the town of Annan in the Annandale and Eskdale district within the Dumfries and Galloway region of south west Scotland. The nearest hamlet is Creca.

== History ==
Chapelcross was the sister plant to Calder Hall in Cumbria, England. Construction was carried out by Mitchell Construction and was completed in 1959. The primary purpose was to produce plutonium for the UK's nuclear weapons programme, for weapons including the WE.177 series. Electricity was always considered to be a by-product. Both Chapelcross and Calder Hall were the only nuclear power stations built as part of the UK's gas reactor fleet to use cooling towers as a heat sink as opposed to using a body of water.

The Chapelcross Works was officially opened on 2 May 1959 by the Lord Lieutenant of Dumfriesshire, Sir John Crabbe. It was initially owned and operated by the Production Group of the United Kingdom Atomic Energy Authority (UKAEA) until the creation of British Nuclear Fuels Limited (BNFL) in 1971 by an act of Parliament. The site then operated in conjunction with Calder Hall under the banner of BNFL's Electricity Generation Business (EGB) until rebranding, relicensing and restructuring of the various nuclear businesses operated by HM Government under the umbrella legal entity of BNFL took place in April 2005.

Chapelcross had four Magnox reactors capable of generating 60 MWe of power each. The reactors were supplied by the UKAEA and the turbines by C.A. Parsons & Company.

Ownership of all of the site's assets and liabilities was transferred to the Nuclear Decommissioning Authority (NDA), a new regulatory body created by the Energy Act 2004. The site was then operated under the two-tier Site Management Company/Site License Company (SMC/SLC) model, with British Nuclear Group's Reactor Sites business as SMC and Magnox Electric Ltd as the SLC. In June 2007, EnergySolutions bought the Reactor Sites Management Company Ltd (RSML, consisting of two operational divisions, Magnox North and Magnox South) from British Nuclear Group. RSML subsequently became Magnox Ltd, then Nuclear Restoration Services, and is now a wholly owned subsidiary of the NDA.

Several significant events in 2001 persuaded BNFL to upgrade the fuel routes of both Calder Hall and Chapelcross to near modern standards at a cost of tens of millions of pounds, to guarantee that a License Instrument would be granted by the Nuclear Installations Inspectorate (NII) to permit final defuelling: the engineering work was carried out by BNS Nuclear Services (formally Alstec).

Generation ceased in June 2004.

=== Decommissioning and the cooling towers ===
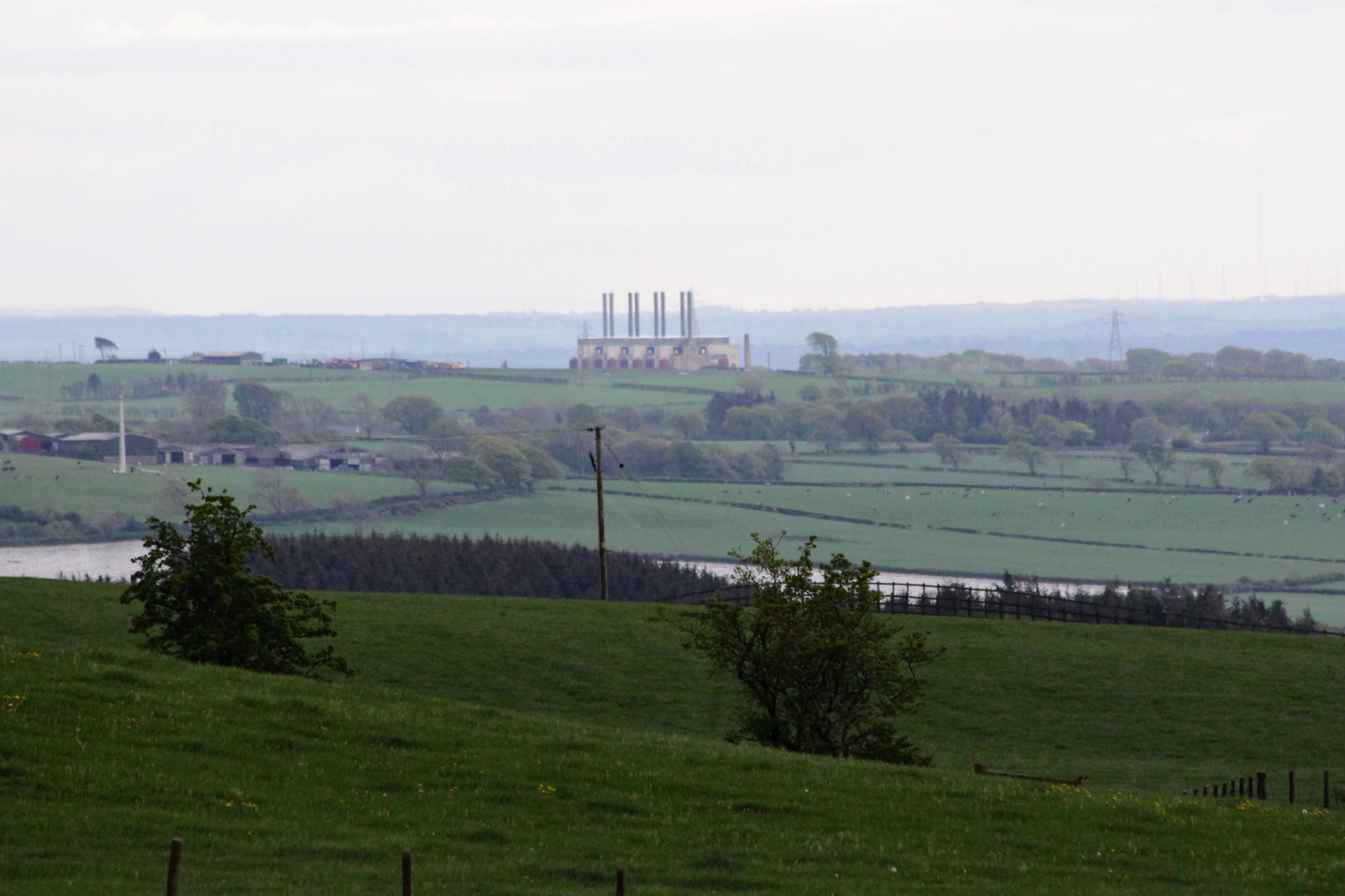
Remains of Chapelcross after demolition of towers

The Health and Safety Executive (HSE) granted consent to carry out decommissioning projects at Chapelcross under the regulations to Magnox Electric Ltd on 26 September 2005. The first visible sign of decommissioning was controlled demolition at 09:00 BST on 20 May 2007 of the four natural-draught concrete cooling towers, which were of the same hyperboloid design as conventional inland power stations such as Didcot, Drax, Ferrybridge and Fiddlers Ferry. The explosions were designed to remove a section of the towers' shells. Approximately two-thirds of the circumference and two-thirds of the shell legs were removed by the blasts, causing a controlled collapse of each tower. The charges were fired sequentially, reducing the 300 ft (91 m) high towers to an estimated 25,000 tons of rubble in less than 10 seconds. Those at Calder Hall were demolished on 29 September 2007.

Some local people (including site employees) were opposed to the obliteration of a symbol of the region's industrial heritage. The towers were considered a local landmark that could be seen from a distance of up to 50 miles (80 km) in good weather conditions. British Nuclear Group and the NDA prioritised conventional demolition over deplanting and post-operational clean-out (POCO) of the nuclear facilities on the site. A large part of the shell of tower 1 managed to resist the explosives despite having a visible bulge that resulted from a construction anomaly.

By December 2012, three of the four reactors had been defuelled. Defuelling was completed in February 2013.

Removal of most buildings is expected to take until 2023–2024, followed by a care and maintenance phase from 2024 to 2089. Demolition of reactor buildings and final site clearance is planned for 2089 to 2095.

== Plant design ==
The plant design was essentially the same as Calder Hall, comprising four 180 MWth graphite moderated, carbon dioxide cooled nuclear reactors fuelled by natural abundance uranium (0.71% ^{235}U) enclosed in magnesium-alloy cans, the principal difference being in plant layout. Since Chapelcross was commissioned from the outset as a four-reactor site (the option for a further four reactors was not exercised) rather than separate two-reactor sites as at Calder 'A' and 'B' stations, the site layout was more compact. There is a single turbine hall housing all eight turbines, which were originally rated at 23 MWe but progressively uprated to 30 MWe as the reactor thermal output was uprated to nominally 265 MWth.

Reactor 1 had the same core design as Calder Hall (i.e. unsleeved), but the fuel channels of reactors 2, 3 and 4 were fitted with graphite sleeves to allow the bulk moderator to run 80 °C (144 °F) hotter, to limit the effects of in-service graphite damage due to irradiation. Two of the reactors were used to produce tritium for the UK's nuclear weapons and required enriched uranium fuel to offset the neutron absorbing effect of the lithium target material.

== Layout and facilities ==
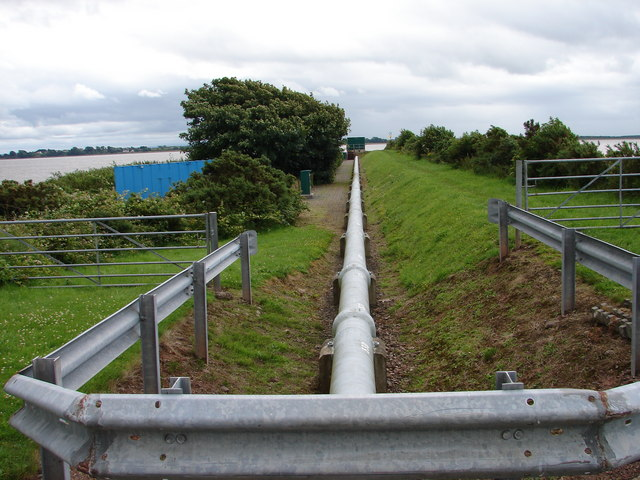
Effluent discharge pipeline approaching the Solway coast south of Annan

The south part of the site consists of a modular administration building, four reactor buildings, turbine hall, maintenance workshops, stores, fuel element cooling pond building, tritium processing plant (CXPP) and new flask handling facility (FHB). The part of the site referred to as north site consists of legacy buildings including aircraft hangars, a graphite handling laboratory and a large building that originally housed some 10,000 drums of yellow depleted uranium trioxide arising from reprocessing at Sellafield. In the mid-2010s, the NDA removed and shipped all of the depleted uranium drums from Chapelcross to Sellafield.

Liquid effluent is disposed of via a 5 km (3.1 miles) long pipeline to the Solway Firth. All environmental discharges are subject to an annual discharge authorisation which is regulated by the Scottish Environment Protection Agency (SEPA).

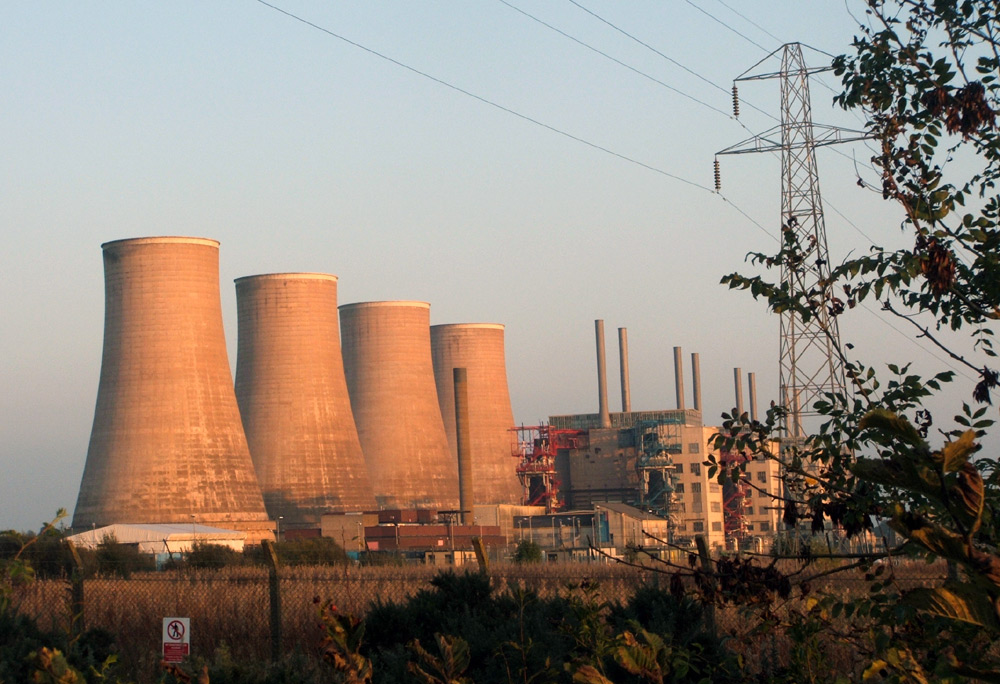
Chapelcross nuclear power station in 2006

Chapelcross produced tritium for the Polaris and Trident strategic nuclear weapon systems from about 1980 until 2005. This was achieved by neutron bombardment of lithium target material, with the tritium gas extracted in the Chapelcross Processing Plant (CXPP). This facility was managed by BNFL on behalf of the Ministry of Defence (MoD). The material was transferred to Atomic Weapons Establishment at Aldermaston via secure road convoys. Because of its involvement in the nuclear weapons programme, the site was not subject to international safeguards until 1998.

== Operating experience and incidents ==
=== Single channel fuel clad melt (May 1967) ===
Fuel in a single channel in Reactor 2 that was loaded with fuel elements under evaluation for the commercial reactor programme experienced a partial blockage, attributed to the presence of graphite debris (see fuel element failure). The fuel overheated and the Magnox cladding failed, causing contamination to be deposited in one region of the core. The reactor was restarted in 1969 after successful clean-out operations and was the final reactor to cease operation in February 2004.

=== Fatal accident (ca. 1978) ===
BNFL was fined £200 in 1978 for a fatal accident at Chapelcross.

=== Boiler shell defect (June 1997) ===
Cracks associated with brackets in Heat Exchanger 6 on Reactor 2 were discovered during routine ultrasonic testing. Metallurgical examination of samples of the defect showed that:

- It originated during fabrication in the workshop and prior to an over-pressure test of 2.35 times the design pressure (a loading significantly in excess of a modern pressure vessel code requirement).
- There was no evidence of in-service fatigue crack growth.
- The material in which the crack was located was different from that specified in the design. Similar material was also identified in other heat exchangers, and no additional cracks of structural significance were revealed during comprehensive inspections. The NII considered the material to be adequate and within the bounds of the heat exchanger safety case.

=== Exposure of workers to an irradiated fuel element (first quarter 2001) ===
During refuelling operations on Reactor 2, an irradiated fuel element failed to release from the grab which holds an element while it is withdrawn from a reactor. Routine methods were used to release the grab. However, the irradiated fuel element snagged during the operation and was lifted out of its shielding, resulting in the operators on the pile cap being exposed to the intense radiation being emitted from the irradiated fuel element. Personnel responded quickly, and the radiological dose they received was small.

The event revealed shortfalls in the safety of the refuelling operation and the licensee took the immediate step of halting all refuelling while it investigated the event and reviewed the safety of the equipment. The NII investigated the event and judged that it was due to inadequate design and operation of the equipment.

The incident was classified as Level 1 (anomaly) on the International Nuclear Event Scale (INES).

=== Leak of Magnox depleted uranium trioxide (July 2001) ===
A small amount of Magnox depleted uranium (MDU) leaked from some corroded mild steel drums due to rainwater ingress and leaching. MDU is a dense yellow powder that is less radiologically toxic than naturally occurring uranium but chemotoxic in a similar manner to lead. Owing to its high density and low solubility, it does not tend to disperse far and dry spills are easy to clean up. This material was stored at the larger sites, including Capenhurst in mild steel drums. BNFL upgraded the fabric of the building and the original drums were overpacked into stainless steel drums and dispatched to Capenhurst for long-term storage.

=== Dropped basket of irradiated fuel elements (July 2001) ===
During routine defuelling activities on Reactor 3, a basket containing 24 low-rated irradiated Magnox fuel elements fell a few feet within the discharge machine onto the door at the top of the fuel discharge well. Remote TV camera inspections revealed that twelve of the elements had fallen just over 80 ft (24 m) down the discharge well into a water-filled transport flask at the bottom. The NII initiated an investigation because dropping irradiated fuel elements is a serious issue even when, as in this event, BNFL had advised NII that there had been no release of radiological activity.

=== Charge pan movement relative to the core (September 2001) ===
Because of known shrinkage of the graphite moderator bricks in the core due to in-service irradiation effects, some of the steel charge pans on top of them had become dislocated from their design position in the interstitial channel and were suspended from the Burst Can Detection (BCD) pipework. This was most prevalent in Reactor 1 because of the different core design to Reactors 2, 3 and 4. BNFL were unable to make an adequate safety case or effect an economic repair and therefore, Reactor 1 did not return to power from its annual outage in August 2001. The core of Reactor 4 was repaired but this reactor did not return to power after the repair.

== Interim storage facility ==
An interim storage facility for storing intermediate level radioactive waste from Chapelcross came into operation in 2021. Construction began in 2014 of the 57 by 23 metres (187 by 75 ft) facility, which can store 700 waste packages for 120 years.

== See also ==
- Nuclear weapons and the United Kingdom
- Nuclear power in Scotland
- Nuclear power in the United Kingdom
- Energy policy of the United Kingdom
- Energy use and conservation in the United Kingdom
