= Cash sweep =

Forced use of free cash flows to pay down outstanding debt

A cash sweep, or debt sweep, is the mandatory use of excess free cash flows to pay down outstanding debt rather than distribute it to shareholders.

Firms always have the option to pay down debt with excess cash, but they do not always choose to do so. This can lead to firms wasting excess cash. A cash sweep forces the firm to pay at least a portion of all excess cash flows a year to pay down its debt at a quicker rate to minimize credit risk and liability.
