= Torness nuclear power station =

Nuclear power plant in East Lothian, Scotland

Torness Nuclear Power Station
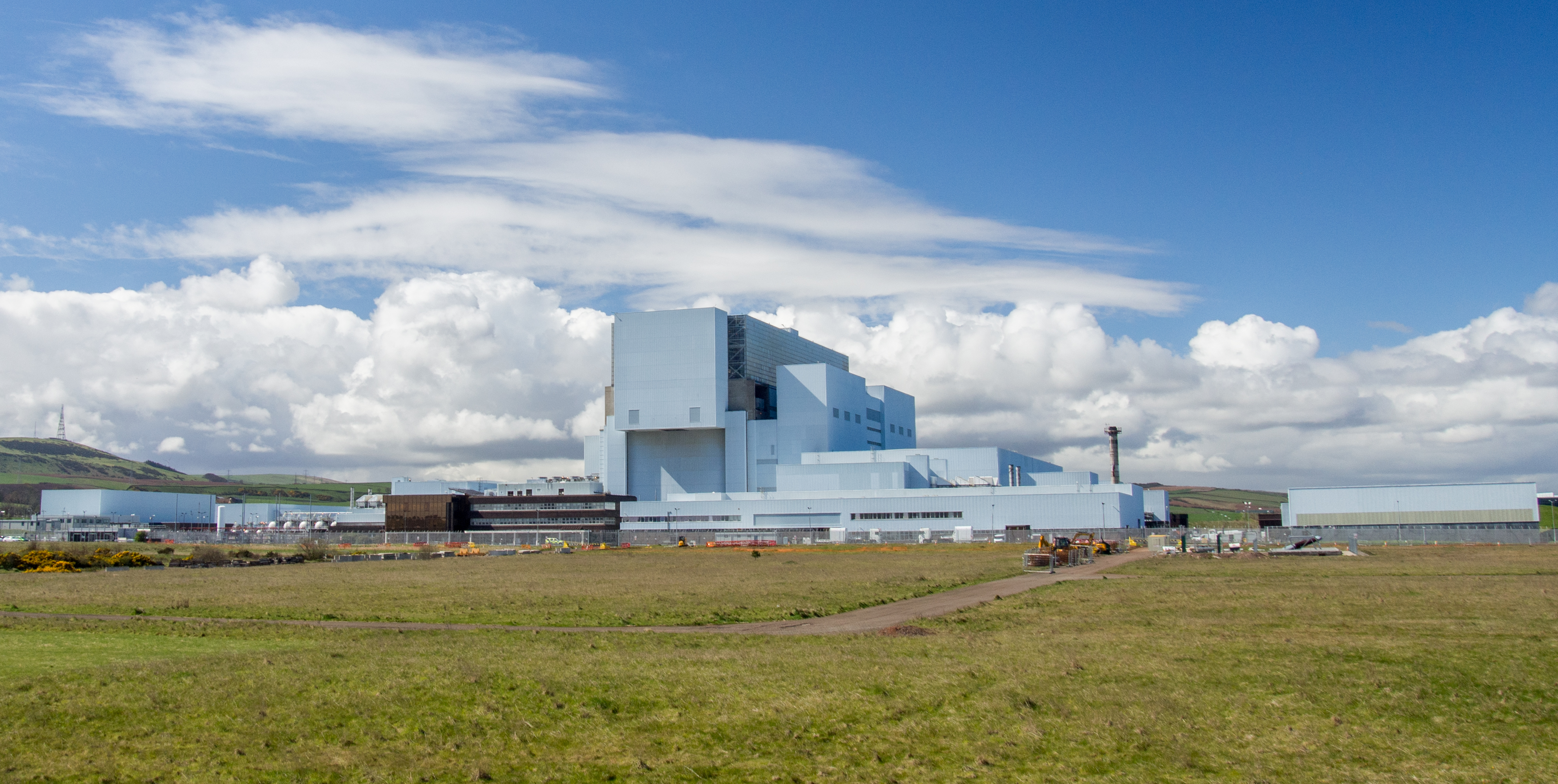

- Location within Scotland
- Country: United Kingdom
- Location: Dunbar, East Lothian
- Coordinates: 55.9680°N 2.4091°W
- Status: Operational
- Construction began: Unit 1: 1 August 1980; Unit 2: 1 August 1980
- Commission date: Unit 1: 25 May 1988; Unit 2: 3 February 1989
- Decommission date: Expected to begin March 2030
- Owner: EDF Energy
- Operator: EDF Energy
- Employees: 730

Nuclear power station
- Reactors: 2
- Reactor type: AGR
- Cooling source: North Sea
- Thermal capacity: 2 × 1623 MW_{t}

Power generation
- Units operational: 1 × 595 MW_{e}; 1 × 605 MW_{e}
- Nameplate capacity: 1,290 MW_{e}
- Capacity factor: Lifetime: Unit 1: 74.8%; Unit 2: 74.6%
- Annual net output: 6,679.35 GWh (24,045.7 TJ) (2021)

External links
- Website: Torness power station and visitor centre | EDF
- Commons: Related media on Commons

Torness nuclear power station is a nuclear power station located approximately 30 miles (50 km) east of Edinburgh at Torness Point near Dunbar in East Lothian, Scotland. It was the last of the United Kingdom's advanced gas-cooled reactors to be fully commissioned. Construction of this facility began in 1980 for the then South of Scotland Electricity Board (SSEB) and it was commissioned in 1988. It is a local landmark, highly visible from the A1 trunk road and East Coast Main Line railway.

The power station is expected to be shut down in March 2030, prior to defuelling and then decommissioning.

== History ==
After extensive discussions with the local planning authority and more than twenty other interested organisations, the South of Scotland Electricity Board (SSEB) sought approval of the Secretary of State for Scotland in 1973 for Torness as a site for a nuclear power station. A public exhibition was held at Dunbar in February 1974 to explain the Board's proposals, and in June 1974, a public inquiry was held.

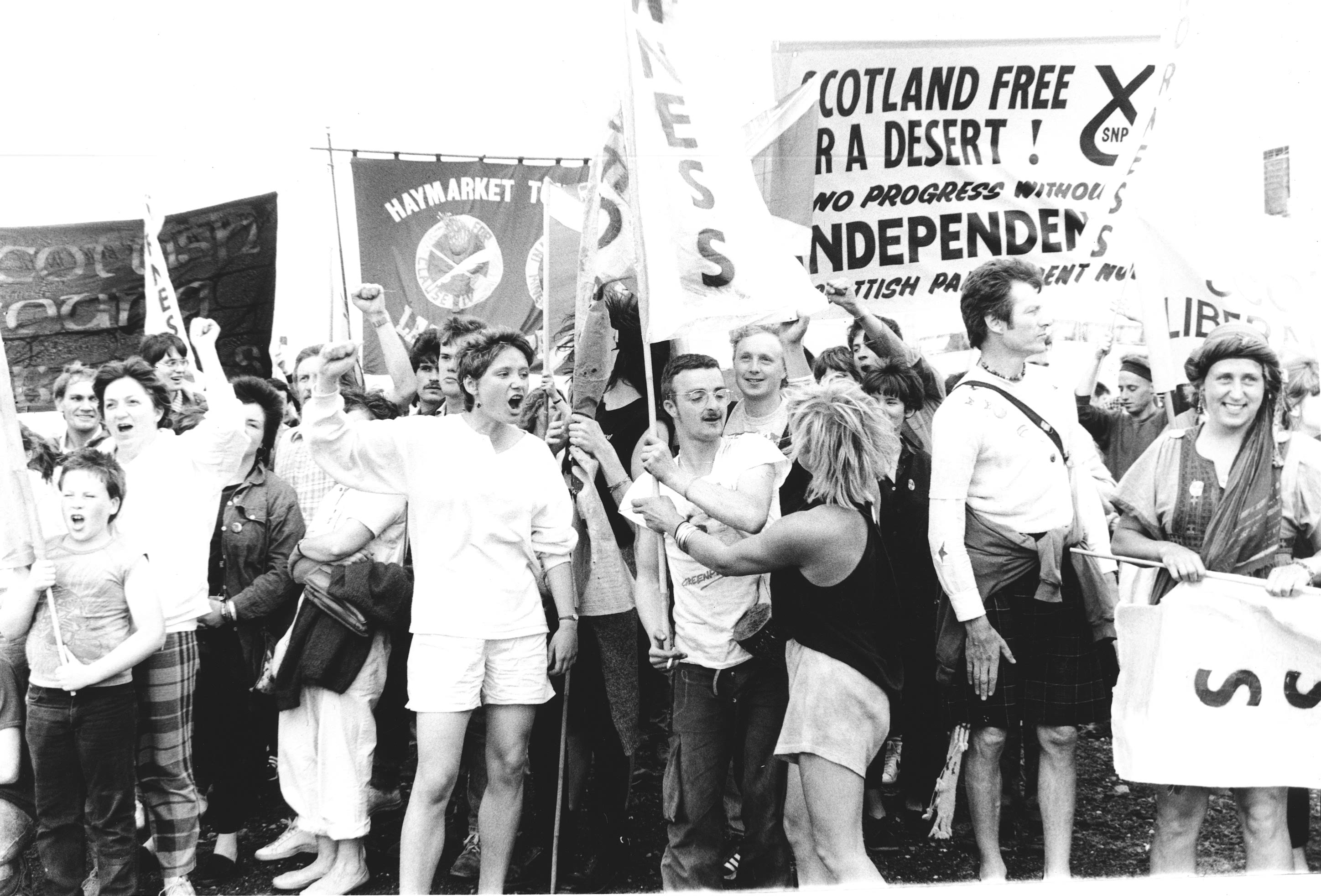
Protest against the construction of Torness

There was widespread public opposition to the building of a nuclear plant at Torness. Diverse campaigning groups came together to highlight the environmental and human cost of nuclear power stations. In May 1978, 4,000 people marched from Dunbar to occupy the Torness site. Many of them signed a declaration to “take all nonviolent steps necessary to prevent the construction of a nuclear power station at Torness”.

The SSEB submitted designs for four types of reactor then being considered by HM Government for the next stage of the UK civil nuclear programme: the advanced gas-cooled reactor (AGR), the Steam Generating Heavy Water Reactor (SGHWR), the Light Water Reactor (LWR) and the High Temperature Reactor (HTR). In February 1975, the Secretary of State for Scotland granted the SSEB statutory consent for the location of future nuclear power stations and, after review of the four alternative reactor types, consent was given on 24 May 1978 for construction of the AGR station.

The construction, which was undertaken by a consortium known as National Nuclear Corporation ('NNC'), began in 1980. The reactors were supplied by NNC, the boilers by NEI and the turbines by GEC.

The station consists of two advanced gas-cooled reactors (AGR) capable of producing a peak rating of 1,364 MWe. In February, 1989, Torness Unit 2 became the last advanced gas-cooled reactor commissioned. On deregulation of the United Kingdom's electricity generation market the following year, Torness passed to the state-owned Scottish Nuclear, privatised as part of British Energy which was sold to the French company Électricité de France (EDF) in January 2009, and incorporated in the latter's UK subsidiary EDF Energy. It was expected to operate until 2030. Cracking is now expected to cause the closure of the plant in March 2028.

In December 2024, in response to concerns over energy security following delays to the opening of Hinkley Point C, EDF announced that the life of Torness would be extended two years until March 2030.

In January 2025, EDF stated that "their ambition is to generate beyond these dates [of March 2030], subject to plant inspections and regulatory oversight".

== Plant design ==
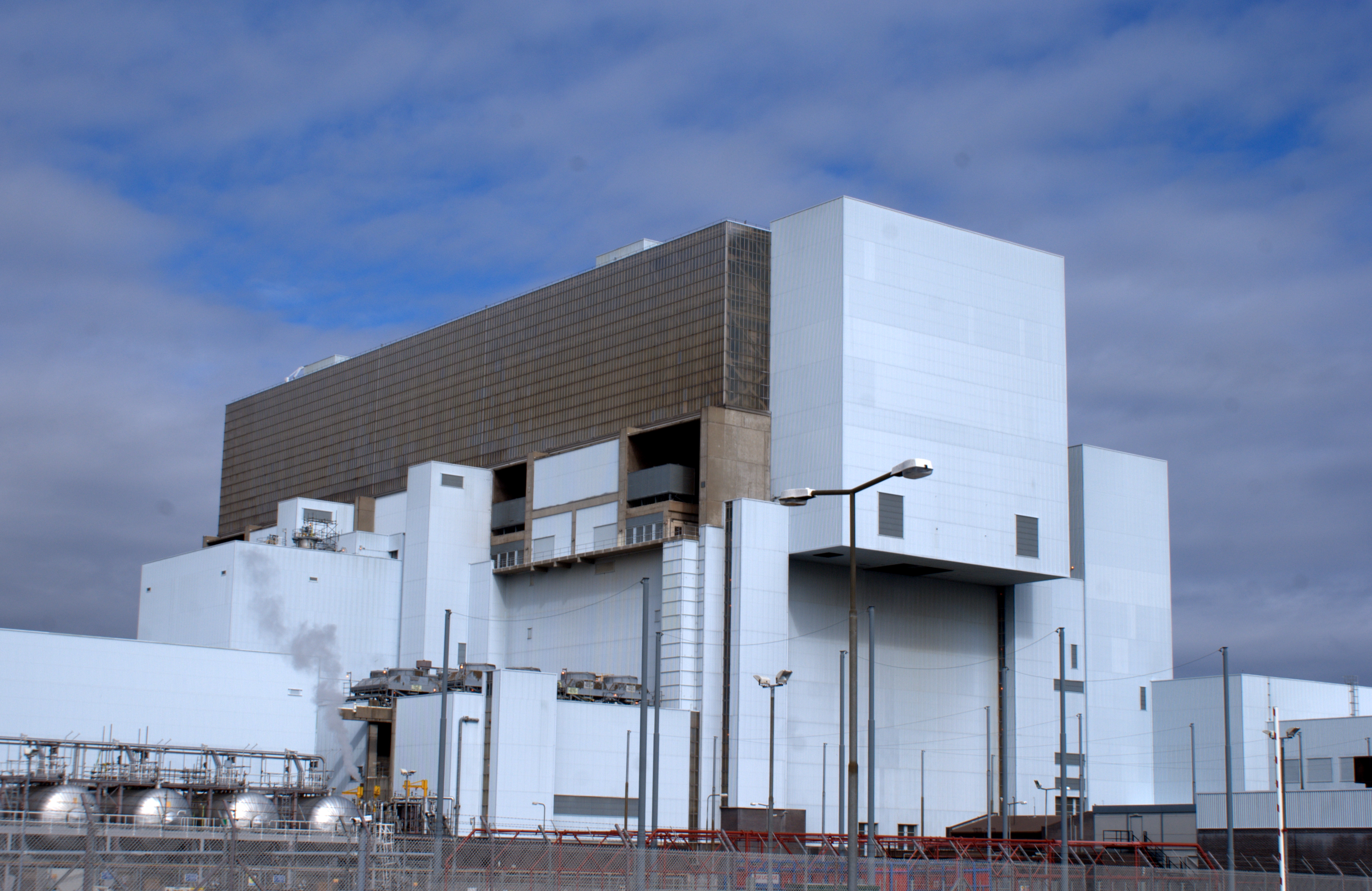
Reactor building

Torness shares its design with Heysham 2 nuclear power station. The station was designed by NNC, a company created from the gradual amalgamation of five consortia that were formed in the 1950s and 1960s to build the UK's commercial nuclear power stations. NNC is now part of Jacobs Engineering Group.

The graphite-moderated, gas-cooled design was proven at the Windscale Advanced Gas Cooled Reactor facility – and is a significant evolution of the Magnox reactor designs.

When first operated, Torness had a sophisticated and complex computerised control system, and was far more sophisticated than earlier members of the advanced gas-cooled reactor fleet. Over 70 Ferranti Argus 700 computers are used in the control and instrumentation systems, which included Digital Direct Control (DDC) of the reactors.

In 2020, the staff training simulator was replaced, partly to reflect plant upgrades and to simulate interactions between the two reactor systems and with auxiliary systems, and to provide modern simulation capabilities. The original reactor control system was unchanged.

Nuclear fuel for Torness power station can be delivered and removed via a loading/unloading facility on a branch from the adjacent East Coast Main Line.

== Incidents ==
The station viewed from the east

In November 1999, a Panavia Tornado F.3 of the Royal Air Force crashed into the North Sea less than 1 km from the power station following an engine failure. The UK Ministry of Defence commended the two crew members for demonstrating "exceptional levels of airmanship and awareness in the most adverse of conditions", because they ensured that the Tornado was clear of the power station before abandoning the aircraft.

In May 2002, a gas circulator pump failed. Forensic evidence suggested an undetected fatigue crack in part of the impeller led to failure. In August, another gas circulator on the other reactor showed increasing vibration and was shut down by the operators. When it was taken apart, there was a fully developed fatigue related crack in a similar position to the first failure, but the prompt shutdown had prevented further damage.

In August 2005, screens in the seawater cooling intake system were blocked by seaweed. This possibility had been foreseen for the plant and preprepared plans were activated, leading to both reactors being shut down.

In June 2011, both reactors were manually shut down due to reduced flow of seawater after intakes were clogged by a large mass of jellyfish.

== See also ==
- Nuclear power in Scotland
- Nuclear power in the United Kingdom
- Energy policy of the United Kingdom
- Energy use and conservation in the United Kingdom
- James L. Gray (SSEB Chief Engineer)
- List of places in East Lothian
