= Hunterston A nuclear power station =

Decommissioned nuclear power plant in Scotland

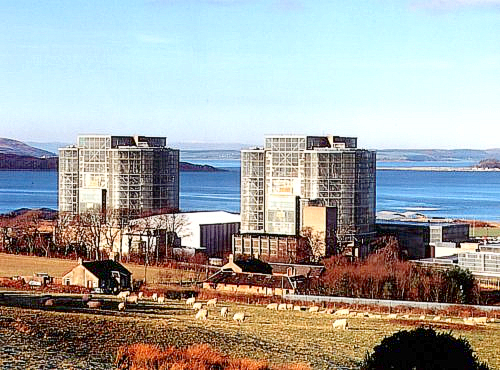
- The Hunterston A Magnox reactor buildings
- Country: Scotland
- Location: North Ayrshire
- Coordinates: 55°43′13″N 4°53′48″W
- Status: Decommissioning in progress
- Construction began: 1957
- Commission date: 1964
- Decommission date: 31 March 1990
- Owners: SSEB (1964–1990); Scottish Nuclear (1990–1996); Magnox Electric (1996–2005); Nuclear Decommissioning Authority (2005–present)
- Operator: Nuclear Restoration Services

Nuclear power station
- Reactor type: Magnox
- Reactor supplier: GEC

Power generation
- Units operational: Six 60 MW C. A. Parsons and Company
- Units decommissioned: 2 x 150 MWe

External links
- Website: nda.gov.uk/sites/hunterstona

Hunterston A nuclear power station is a former Magnox nuclear power station located at Hunterston in Ayrshire, Scotland, adjacent to Hunterston B. The ongoing decommissioning process is being managed by Nuclear Decommissioning Authority (NDA) subsidiary Nuclear Restoration Services.

== History ==
Construction of the power station, which was undertaken by a consortium of GEC and Simon Carves, began in 1957 and the facility was opened by Queen Elizabeth the Queen Mother on 22 September 1964. Hunterston A had two Magnox reactors capable of generating 180 MWe each. The reactors were supplied by GEC and the turbines by C.A. Parsons & Company. The main civil engineering contractor was Mowlem.

The Magnox reactors used natural uranium fuel (in magnox alloy 'cans') within a graphite core, and were cooled by carbon dioxide gas. Each reactor, which consisted of more than 3,000 fuel channels, was enclosed in a steel pressure vessel. Eight boilers, known as Steam Raising Units, were located around each reactor. An outer building, mainly of glass, provided weather protection. The six 60 MW generators were located in an adjoining turbine hall.

The Hunterston A reactor design was unique in that each was raised up to a height of over 10 m (33 feet) to enable refuelling to take place from underneath. This meant that gravity assisted the process of used fuel removal, and avoided the need for lifting machinery to be inserted into the active core for on-load refuelling.

In later years of operation, the reactors were derated to 150 MWe each. This was to slow the corrosion of steel components which, at the original higher temperatures, could have compromised reactor life.

The construction of Cruachan Power Station, a pumped-storage hydroelectric dam and power station, was linked to that of Hunterston A, to store its surplus night-time generated electricity.

=== Shutdown and decommissioning ===
Hunterston A closed in 1990, with Reactor 2 shutting down on 31 December 1989 and Reactor 1 on 31 March 1990, immediately prior to the splitting of SSEB into Scottish Power and Scottish Nuclear. The ongoing decommissioning process is being managed by NDA subsidiary Nuclear Restoration Services, formerly Magnox Ltd.

Defuelling, removal of most buildings and a care and maintenance phase is planned until 2072. Demolition of reactor buildings and final site clearance is planned for 2072 to 2080

== Ownership ==
From construction to closure in March 1990, the power station was owned and operated by South of Scotland Electricity Board. As part of the privatisation of the Scottish electricity generators, Hunterston A was transferred, with the adjacent Hunterston B, to the new state owned company Scottish Nuclear. In 1996, upon privatisation of the UK nuclear industry, the site was transferred, this time on its own to the state-owned Magnox Electric. In April 2005, the NDA took over ownership and placed the site with its Site Licence company, Magnox North Ltd, which later became Magnox Ltd.

== See also ==
- Nuclear power in Scotland
