= Hunterston B nuclear power station =

Nuclear power plant in North Ayrshire, Scotland

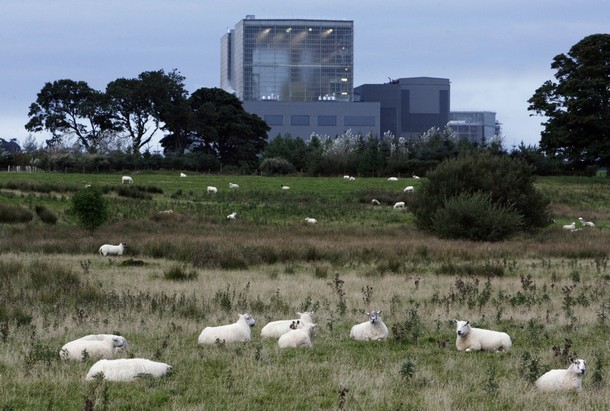
- The Hunterston B AGR reactor building.
- Official name: Hunterston B
- Country: Scotland
- Location: North Ayrshire, Ayrshire and Arran
- Coordinates: 55.7221°N 4.8901°W
- Status: Decommissioning
- Construction began: 1 November 1967
- Commission date: Reactor B1: 6 February 1976; Reactor B2: 31 March 1977
- Decommission date: 26 November 2021 (Reactor B1 shutdown); 7 January 2022 (Reactor B2 shutdown)
- Owner: Nuclear Decommissioning Authority
- Operator: Nuclear Restoration Services

Nuclear power station
- Reactor type: GCR - AGR
- Reactor supplier: TNPG
- Thermal capacity: 2 x 1,496 MW_{t}
- Lifetime electricity generated: 287.22 TWh (1,034.0 PJ)

Power generation
- Units decommissioned: 2 x 625 MW_{e} (Design); 1 x 490 MW_{e} + 1 x 495 MW_{e} (Operations); 2 x 644 MW_{e} (Gross)
- Nameplate capacity: 1,248 MW_{e}
- Capacity factor: B1: 68.7% (Lifetime); B2: 69.7% (Lifetime)
- Annual net output: 6,423.24 GWh (23,123.7 TJ) (2021)

External links
- Website: Hunterston B power station | EDF
- Commons: Related media on Commons

Hunterston B nuclear power station is a shut-down AGR nuclear power station in North Ayrshire, Scotland. Located about six miles (ten kilometres) south of Largs and about 2 1/2 miles (4 kilometres) northwest of West Kilbride on the Firth of Clyde coast. The station began producing electricity in 1976, and was permanently shut down in 2022.

Hunterston B is similar in design to sister station Hinkley Point B, which ceased operations in August 2022.

== History ==
The construction of Hunterston B was undertaken by a consortium known as The Nuclear Power Group (TNPG). The two advanced gas-cooled reactors (AGR) were supplied by TNPG and the turbines by C. A. Parsons & Co. Hunterston B began to generate electricity on 6 February 1976.

On 3 December 1977, The Times reported that seawater had entered the reactor through a modification of the secondary cooling system. The secondary cooling system used fresh water to cool parts including the bearings of the gas circulators, which circulated the carbon dioxide (CO_{2}) coolant through the reactor to the boilers. A small leak of CO_{2} through a seal had developed, and a bypass pipe was installed to remove the water contaminated with CO_{2} to the seawater cooling ponds. When maintenance work was carried out on the reactor and the pressure in the gas cooling system was reduced, sea water was able to flow back up this bypass pipe and into the reactor. The residual heat of the reactor was such that the seawater evaporated rapidly, leaving deposits of salt in the reactor around the gas circuit.

It was estimated at the time that the reactor could be out of operation for a year, that the repairs could cost £14 million, and that electricity tariffs would have to rise by between 1 and 2 per cent. Extensive modelling work was performed in the Nuclear Power Company's (NPC) Whetstone, Leicestershire, fluid flow laboratories to determine where the salt would have been deposited, and the salt was successfully removed by technicians using vacuum cleaners and the plant returned to operation.

In February 1997, there was concern that contaminated CO_{2} gas from the plant had entered three road tankers and then entered the food chain via soft drinks and beers. Carlsberg-Tetley withdrew all its gas cylinders in Scotland as a result of finding contamination in one.

In December 1998, an INES Level 2 incident occurred after severe winds and sea spray disabled all four power lines to the site during the Boxing Day Storm of 1998. After multiple grid failures in a short period of time, emergency diesel generators failed to start. Normally, in the absence of power for the reactor cooling pumps, the reactor would be passively cooled. However, the emergency control system which would have initiated passive cooling failed to act, as it had not been reset. Reactor cooling was reinstated after four hours. There was considerable confusion and delay in restoring power as plant schematics and security systems were computerised but were rendered inoperable due to lack of electrical power.

Due to the inherent safety margins of the AGR reactor design, there was no reactor damage, and the plant would have tolerated loss of cooling for 20 hours. The subsequent investigation made several recommendations: redesign of the insulators on the 400 kV power lines, installation of an additional 132 kV power line for emergency power, a second diesel generator building remote from the first, installation of an uninterruptible power supply for the reactor safety systems and for essential computer equipment, provision of hard copy plant schematics and emergency protocols, and revised staff training procedures including simulation of multiple simultaneous system failures.

In 2006, concerns were raised in a report commissioned by Greenpeace that the graphite moderator core in each of the twin reactors at Hunterston B might have developed structural problems in the form of cracking of the bricks (as at similar AGR power stations).

Its net electrical output was 1,215 MW. In 2007, the reactors were restricted to operating at a reduced level of around 70% of full output (around 850 MWe net). Subsequent work during maintenance shutdowns resulted in Reactor 3 operating at around 82% (540 Mwe net) in early 2011, and Reactor 4 at around 73% (480 MWe net). In total this equated to around 1,020 MWe gross output from the generators. Internal load of 90 MWe brought net output to approximately 930 MWe. Hunterston B was capable of supplying the electricity needs of over 1 million homes.

Hunterston B was originally planned to operate until 2011. In 2007, planned operation was extended by five years to 2016. In December 2012, EDF said it could (technically and economically) operate until 2023.

=== Graphite core keyway root cracks ===
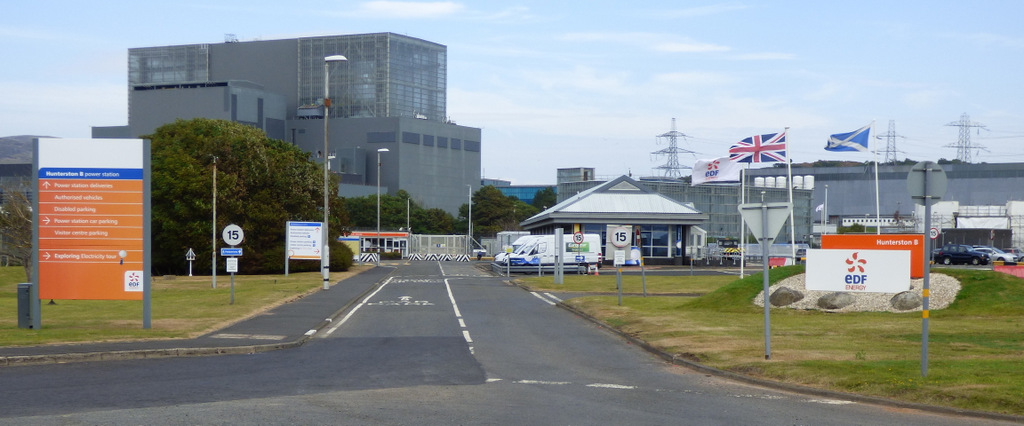
Hunterston B in 2018

In October 2014, it was reported that cracks had been found in one of the reactors at the plant following routine inspections which began in August 2014. Two of about 3,000 graphite bricks in the core of reactor four at Hunterston were affected. The plant's operator, EDF Energy, said the cracking was predicted to occur as the station ages and said that the issue would not affect the safe operation of the reactor.

In October 2016, it was announced that super-articulated control rods would be installed in the reactor because of concerns about the stability of the reactors' graphite cores. The Office for Nuclear Regulation (ONR) had raised concerns over the number of fractures in keyways that locked together the graphite bricks in the core. An unusual event, such as an earthquake, might have destabilised the graphite so that ordinary control rods that were used to shut the reactor down could not be inserted. Super-articulated control rods were designed to be insertable even into a destabilised core.

In early 2018, a higher rate of new keyway root cracks than modelled was observed in Reactor 3 during a scheduled outage, and EDF announced in May 2018: "While Hunterston B Reactor 3 could return to operation from the current outage, it will remain offline while the company works with the regulator to ensure that the longer term safety case reflects the findings of the recent inspections and includes the results obtained from other analysis and modelling."

In December 2018, EDF pushed back their estimated return to service date to March 2019 for Reactor 4 and April 2019 for Reactor 3, to allow for further modelling work and a new seismic analysis. In March 2019, pictures of the cracking were released with EDF stating that it intended to seek permission from the ONR to restart reactor 3 by raising the operational limit for the number of cracks. About 370 fractures were discovered, on average 2 mm (3/32 in) wide, in about 10% of the graphite bricks in the reactor core. This was above the operational limit of 350 fractures, and EDF intended to present a new safety case for an operational limit of 700 cracks.

One reactor was restarted on 25 August 2019 then shut down again on 10 December 2019. In August 2020, EDF received regulatory approval to restart the two reactors, in August and September 2020 respectively, before moving to defuel and decommission the plant starting no later than 7 January 2022.

=== Closure, defuelling and decommissioning ===
Reactor 3 was taken offline for the final time at midday on 26 November 2021. Reactor 4 was shut down at midday on 7 January 2022, ending 46 years of generation at the station.

On 19 May 2022, EDF announced that defueling had started on the two Hunterston B units. This process was expected to take over three years to complete, and it involved the complete emptying of all fuel channels from both reactors. This amounted to over 300 channels from each reactor, each containing 8 fuel elements. Fully loaded flasks containing the used fuel were dispatched from the site by rail to Sellafield at a maximum rate of three per week.

The ONR announced in October 2023 that the defuelling of reactor 3 had been completed, and in April 2025 that the defuelling of reactor 4 had been completed. The latter announcement was followed by the Hunterston B site being declared 'nuclear fuel free'.

On 1 April 2026, EDF Energy transferred ownership and control of the Hunterston B site to the Nuclear Decommissioning Authority (NDA) and the NDA's subsidiary Nuclear Restoration Services respectively, to enable those organisations to start the process of decommissioning the station.

== See also ==
- Hunterston A nuclear power station nearby, shutdown 1990, also being decommissioned.
- Nuclear power in Scotland
- Nuclear power in the United Kingdom
- Energy policy of the United Kingdom
- Energy use and conservation in the United Kingdom
- Western HVDC Link, a 2.2 GW cable from Hunterston to Wales
