= Institution of Engineers in Scotland =

Scottish professional body

- Established: 1 May 1857
- Type: Engineering and Shipbuilding professional association
- Headquarters: Fyfe Chambers, 105 West George Street, Glasgow, Scotland, G2 1QL
- Region served: Scotland
- Services: open lectures, social events, annual James Watt Dinner
- Key people: Graeme Fletcher (President); Dr Malcolm Robb FIES (Vice President)
- Website: engineers.scot

The Institution of Engineers in Scotland (IES) is a multi-disciplinary professional body and learned society, founded in Scotland, for professional engineers in all disciplines and for those associated with or taking an interest in their work. Its main activities are an annual series of evening talks on engineering, open to all, and a range of school events aimed at encouraging young people to consider engineering careers. Between 1870 and 2020, the institution was known as the Institution of Engineers and Shipbuilders in Scotland (IESIS).

IES is registered as a Scottish Charity, No. SC011583, and is the fourth oldest, still-active, registered Company in Scotland.

Members, Fellows, Graduates or Companions are entitled to use the abbreviated distinctive letters after their name - MIES, FIES, GIES, CIES.

== Foundation ==
The inaugural meeting of the Institution of Engineers in Scotland was held on 1 May 1857. Office bearers were appointed, and the principal objective of the new institution was set down as "the encouragement and advancement of Engineering Science and Practice". It was to have a broad basis for membership, and engineers from the mining, foundry, railway, iron, shipbuilding, and other industries were to be eligible. The prime movers behind the founding of the Institution were William John Macquorn Rankine, Regius Professor of Civil Engineering and Mechanics at the University of Glasgow, and Walter Montgomerie Neilson, one of the major figures in establishing Glasgow's locomotive-building industry. Rankine was the first President of the Institution and Neilson succeeded him in 1859. The engineer James Howden, who died in 1913, was the last surviving founding member of the Institution.

The Institution was an early promoter of consciousness of industrial effects on the environment. In those early years there was a pervading atmosphere of inquiry into the applications of steam power. In 1858 the Institution was responsible for a public meeting, held in the Glasgow City Chambers, to establish "An Association for Promoting Safety, Economy and Absence of Smoke in the raising and use of Steam".

The Scottish Shipbuilders Association had been formed in 1860 and amalgamated with the Institution of Engineers in Scotland on 25 October 1865. The name Institution of Engineers and Shipbuilders in Scotland was adopted in 1870. The first female President of the Institution, Karen Dinardo, took office on 4 October 2016, at the start of a two-year term. Her father, Carlo Dinardo, had been president in 1999–2001.

The Institution has had a number of headquarters. The building at 39 Elmbank Crescent, Glasgow, was commissioned and built in 1906–08 and was designed by J.B. Wilson. In the foyer of this building, there is a memorial to the 36 engineers who died on the RMS Titanic. The marble and bronze memorial was subscribed by members, designed by the sculptor William Kellock Brown, and unveiled on 15 April 1914. The Institution, with the permission of Scottish Opera, current occupiers of the building, organised a memorial service in the building on 14 April 2012.

== Current name ==
In 2020, the Institution reverted its name to the Institution of Engineers in Scotland, reflecting the breadth of engineering disciplines among its membership and practiced throughout Scotland.

== Lectures ==
In addition to an annual programme of evening talks on various engineering topics, the Institution endows two prestige lectures:

- The annual MacMillan Memorial Lecture established in 1959 in memory of Hugh Miller MacMillan, a prominent shipbuilding Engineer in Scotland, England and Northern Ireland.
- The biennial Marlow (Scotland) Lecture established in 1964.

Both have attracted high-profile speakers.

== Digitisation programme ==
IES has a significant collection of engineering papers and other materials in its archives. Since 2013, there has been a programme to digitise all Transactions of the Institution from its earliest days so that these may be made available as a reference resource.

== Scottish Engineering Hall of Fame ==
In 2011, IES launched a new initiative, the Scottish Engineering Hall of Fame, to celebrate Scotland's tradition of engineering and shipbuilding. It provides role models for young people considering careers in engineering.

The first seven inductees were announced by President Gordon Masterton at the Institution's annual James Watt Dinner in September 2011. As of 2024, there have been 60 names added to the Hall of Fame, 14 of whom were living inductees (in alphabetical order): Douglas Anderson (retinal imaging), Thomas Graham Brown (ultrasound scanner), Craig Clark (satellite engineer), James Goodfellow (automated teller machine), Hugh Gill (bionic hand), Naeem Hussain (bridge engineer), Carol Marsh (electronics engineer), Gordon McConnell (aircraft engineer), Sir Jim McDonald (electrical power engineer and University leader), Sir Duncan Michael (structural engineer and business leader), Sir Donald Miller (electrical power engineer and business leader), David Milne (electronics pioneer and business leader), Ian Ritchie (computing engineer and business leader), Stephen Salter (wave power pioneer).

To date there have been six female inductees, Dorothée Pullinger, Anne Gillespie Shaw, Victoria Drummond, Mary Fergusson, Anne Neville and Carol Marsh.

The Hall of Fame panel encourages nominations from the public as well as members.

== Presidents ==
The following is a list of the presidents of the Institution since its inception:.

- 1857-59 William John Macquorn Rankine, LLD, FRSE, FRS, Regius Professor of Civil Engineering and Mechanics, University of Glasgow
- 1859-61 Walter Montgomerie Neilson, Hyde Park Locomotive Works, Glasgow
- 1861-63 William Johnstone, Resident Engineer, Glasgow and South Western Railway, Glasgow
- 1863-65 James Robert Napier, Engineer and Shipbuilder Glasgow
- 1865-67 James Gray Lawrie, Engineer and Shipbuilder, Glasgow
- 1867-69 James Morris Gale, Engineer, Glasgow Corporation Water Works
- 1869-70 William John Macquorn Rankine, LLD, FRSE, FRS, Regius Professor of Civil Engineering and Mechanics, University of Glasgow (Note: John Elder, Shipbuilder, Glasgow, was elected for session 1869-70, but died before taking office)
- 1870-72 David Rowan, Marine Engineer, Glasgow
- 1872-74 Robert Duncan, Shipbuilder, Port Glasgow
- 1874-76 Hazelton Robson, Marine Engineer, Glasgow
- 1876-78 Robert Bruce Bell, Civil Engineer, Glasgow
- 1878-80 Robert Mansel, Shipbuilder, Glasgow
- 1880-82 John Lennox Kincaid Jamieson, Marine Engineer, Glasgow
- 1882-84 James Reid, Hyde Park Locomotive Works, Glasgow
- 1884-86 James Thomson, LLD, FRS, Regius Professor of Civil Engineering and Mechanics, University of Glasgow
- 1886-87 William Denny, Shipbuilder, Dumbarton
- 1887-89 Alexander Carnegie Kirk, LLD, Marine Engineer, Glasgow
- 1889-91 Ebenezer Kemp, Marine Engineer, Glasgow
- 1891-93 Robert Dundas, Resident Engineer, Southern Division, Caledonian Railway, Glasgow
- 1893-95 John Inglis, LLD, Engineer and Shipbuilder, Glasgow
- 1895-97 Sir William Arrol, LLD, MP, Engineer and Bridge Builder, Glasgow
- 1897-99 George Russell, Mechanical Engineer, Motherwell
- 1899-01 Robert Caird, LLD, FRSE, Shipbuilder, Greenock
- 1901-03 William Foults, Engineer, Glasgow Corporation Gas Works
- 1903-05 Sir Archibald Denny, Bt., LLD, Shipbuilder, Dumbarton
- 1905-07 James Gilchrist, Marine Engineer, Glasgow
- 1907-09 John Ward, Shipbuilder, Glasgow
- 1909-10 Charles Pullar Hogg, Civil Engineer, Glasgow
- 1910-11 Archibald Barr, LLD, DSc, Regius Professor of Civil Engineering and Mechanics, University of Glasgow
- 1911-13 Ebenezer Hall-Brown, Marine Engineer, Glasgow
- 1913-15 Robert Thomas Moore, DSc, Civil and Mining Engineer, Glasgow
- 1915-17 William Walker Lackie, CBE, Engineer and Manager, Glasgow Corporation Electricity Works
- 1917-19 Alexander Cleghorn, FRSE, Marine Engineer, Glasgow
- 1919-21 Thomas Blackwood Murray, DSc, Automobile Engineer, Glasgow
- 1921-23 Harold Edgar Yarrow, CBE, Shipbuilder, Glasgow
- 1923-25 James Howden Hume, Marine Engineer, Glasgow
- 1925-27 Archibald Jack Campbell, Shipbuilder, Dalmuir
- 1927-29 Ralph David Moore, BSc, Steel Founder, Glasgow
- 1929-31 Colonel Sir James Lithgow, Bt., MC, DL, Shipbuilder, Port Glasgow
- 1931-33 Archibald Gilchrist, OBE, Marine Engineer, Glasgow
- 1933-35 John Dewar Cormack, CMG, CBE, DSc, Regius Professor of Civil Engineering and Mechanics, University of Glasgow
- 1935-37 Percy Archibald Hillhouse, DSc, John Elder Professor of Naval Architecture, University of Glasgow
- 1937-39 Alfred Charles Gardner, FRSE, Engineer, Clyde Navigation Trust, Glasgow
- 1939-41 Wilfrid Ayre, Shipbuilder, Burntisland
- 1941-43 Frederick Charles Stewart, Engineer, Glasgow
- 1943-45 A. Murray Stephen, MC, BA, Shipbuilder, Glasgow
- 1945-47 Allan Stevenson, CBE, Marine Engineer, Glasgow
- 1947-49 James M. McNeill, MC, LLD, Naval Architect, Clydebank
- 1949-51 Gilbert Cook, DSc, FRS, Regius Professor of Civil Engineering and Mechanics, University of Glasgow
- 1951-52 Sir Andrew McCance, DL, DSc, LLD, FRS, Metallurgist, Glasgow
- 1952-54 Sir William Wallace, CBE, FRSE, Mechanical Engineer, Edinburgh
- 1954-56 Andrew McCance Robb, DSc, John Elder Professor of Naval Architecture, University of Glasgow
- 1956-57 Sir Harold E. Yarrow, Bt., CBE, LLD, Engineer and Shipbuilder, Glasgow
- 1957-59 James Small, DSc, PhD, James Watt Professor of Mechanical Engineering, University of Glasgow
- 1959-61 John Brown, BSc, Naval Architect, Clydebank
- 1961-63 Iain Maxwell Stewart, BSc, Engineer, Glasgow
- 1963-65 Adam Simpson Turnbull Thomson, DSc, PhD, FRSE, Professor of Mechanical Engineering, Royal College of Science and Technology, Glasgow
- 1965-67 James Lenaghan, CBE, Shipbuilder, Glasgow
- 1967-69 William Proudfoot Walker, Naval Architect, Edinburgh
- 1969-71 Sir John William Atwell, CBE, MSc, FRSE, Engineer, Glasgow
- 1973-73 William M. Cormie, CBE, BSc, Civil Engineer, Glasgow
- 1973-75 J. Burton Davies, BSc, CEng, Naval Architect, Glasgow
- 1975-77 A.W. Scott, CBE, PhD, BSc, CEng
- 1977-79 William George Nicholson Geddes, CBE, BSc, FEng, FRSE, Civil Engineer, Glasgow
- 1979-81 B.N. Baxter, MSc, PhD, CEng, Naval Architect, Glasgow
- 1981-83 J.A. Turner, BSc, CEng, Mechanical Engineer, Clydebank
- 1983-85 Alexander M.M. Stephen, BA, CEng, Shipbuilder, Glasgow
- 1985-87 John Rorke, CBE, BSc, PhD, FRSE, CEng
- 1987-89 Thomas O. Leith, OBE, BSc, CEng, Mechanical Engineer, Glasgow
- 1989-91 H.C. Simpson, BSc, ScD, FRSE, Professor
- 1991-93 I.C. Broadley, BSc, CEng, FInstE, Mechanical Engineer, Glasgow
- 1993-95 J. Neumann, CBE, FEng, Mechanical Engineer, Glasgow
- 1995-97 Douglas Faulkner, Wh.Sc., RCNC, PhD, DSc, FREng, John Elder Professor of Naval Architecture, Glasgow
- 1997-99 Sir Robert Easton, CBE, DUniv, Shipbuilder, Glasgow
- 1999-01 Carlo Dinardo, CEng, Civil Engineer, Paisley
- 2001-01 Dan Kirkwood, BSc(Hons), PhD, CEng, Professor of Metallurgy, Glasgow (Note: Resigned)
- 2001-04 Anthony Slaven, MA, BLitt, FRHistS, Professor of History, Glasgow
- 2004-06 Crawford F. Gorrie, CEng, Engineer, Glasgow
- 2006-08 Ernest Chambers, BSc, Civil Engineer, Glasgow
- 2008-10 David K. Harrison, MEng, PhD, Professor of Engineering, Glasgow Caledonian University
- 2010-12 Gordon Grier Thomson Masterton, OBE, Hon.D.Eng, Hon.D.Tech, BA, MSc, FREng, FRSE, Civil Engineer, Glasgow
- 2012-14 Iain MacLeod, BSc, PhD, Emeritus Professor of Structural Engineering, University of Strathclyde, Glasgow
- 2014-16 Philip Preston, BSc, CEng, MICE, Civil Engineer, Glasgow
- 2016-18 Karen Dinardo, BSc, CEng, MIStructE, MICE, Civil Engineer, Paisley
- 2018-20 David Westmore, BSc, CEng, MRINA, Naval Architect, Paisley
- 2020-22 Andy Pearson, BSc, PhD, CEng, Refrigeration Engineer, Glasgow
- 2022-24 Dick Philbrick, BSc, MSc, Naval Architect & Mechanical Engineer, Glasgow
- 2024-26 Graeme Fletcher, BS, Naval Engineer, Paisley.
