= Donald John Miller =

Scottish electrical engineer

Sir Donald Miller Kt FREng FIMechE FIET
- Born: Donald John Miller; 9 February 1927; Scotland
- Died: 19 September 2023 (aged 96)
- Education: University of Aberdeen
- Engineering career
- Discipline: Electrical Engineering
- Employers: Metropolitan-Vickers; North of Scotland Hydro-Electric Board; South of Scotland Electricity Board; Scottish Power

Sir Donald John Miller (9 February 1927 – 19 September 2023) was a Scottish electrical engineer and former chairman of the South of Scotland Electricity Board and Scottish Power.

== Education ==
Sir Donald Miller was educated at Banchory Academy and was awarded a BSc in Engineering from the University of Aberdeen in 1947.

== Career ==
Miller's career spanned a number of private and public organisations in the electrical power industry. This included an apprenticeship with Metropolitan-Vickers, the British Electricity Authority and Preece, Cardew and Rider consulting engineers. He also held senior roles with the two Scottish electricity boards during a period of major technological change. Between 1966 and 1974 he was chief engineer of the North of Scotland Hydro-Electric Board with responsibility for all engineering operations and the design and construction of new pumped storage hydropower generation and thermal power stations. In 1974 he joined the South of Scotland Electricity Board as Director of Engineering responsible for all engineering operations including the completion of three major power stations at Longannet (coal), Hunterston B (nuclear) and Inverkip (oil). In 1982 he was appointed chairman.

Ahead of the Electricity Act 1989, which privatised the British electricity industry, he argued successfully for the retention of the vertically integrated structure of the Scottish electricity supply industry; the newly created Scottish Power retained all but the nuclear assets in the south of Scotland. Following privatisation in 1991 he held the role of chairman of Scottish Power until retirement in 1992. He was subsequently chairman of Premium Trust plc, an Edinburgh-based financial firm. between 1993 and 1998.

== Awards and recognition ==
In 1990 he was made Knight Bachelor for services to industry.

He was elected Fellow of the Royal Academy of Engineering in 1981; and Fellow of the Royal Society of Edinburgh in 1987. He also held Fellowships with the Institution of Mechanical Engineers and the Institution of Engineering and Technology.

He was awarded Honorary Doctorates by the University of Strathclyde in 1992 and the University of Aberdeen in 1997 as well as Honorary Membership of the British Nuclear Energy Society in 1989 and Honorary Fellowship of the Institution of Engineers in Scotland in 2015. He was inducted into the Scottish Engineering Hall of Fame in 2015.
