= Fiio F9 =

Earphone model

FiiO F9 and FiiO F9 Pro
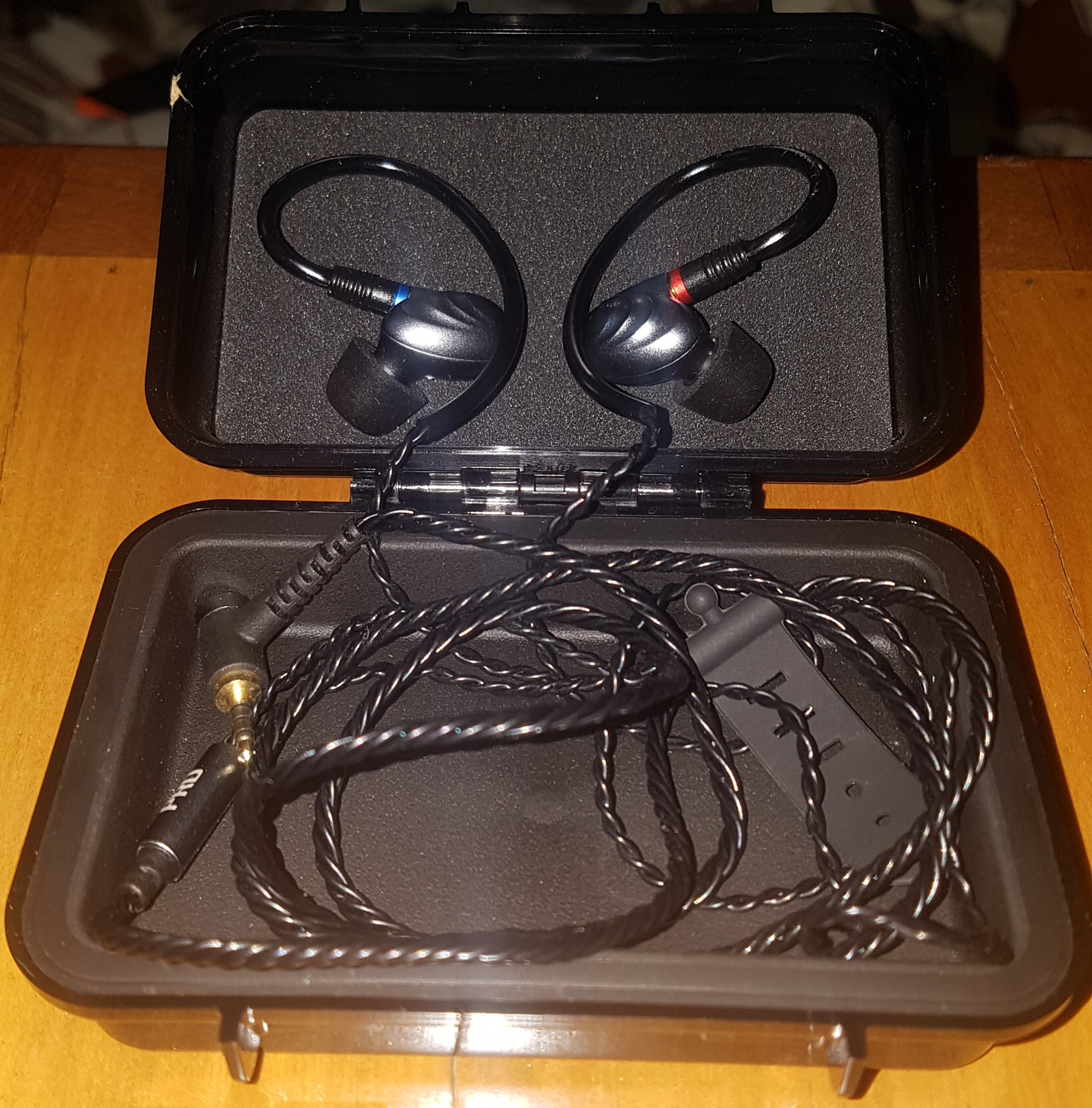
- FiiO F9
- Manufacturer: FiiO Electronics Technology
- Sound: Sensitivity: 106 dB/mW; Frequency response: 15Hz ~ 40kHz; Impedance: 28 Ω Noise isolation: 26 dB
- Connectivity: 3.5 millimetres TRRS; 2.5 millimetres Balanced cable
- Website: www.fiio.com.cn

FiiO F9 and FiiO F9 Pro are noise-isolating earphones manufactured and marketed by FiiO Electronics Technology. They are aimed at listeners who prefer strong bass and are rated as one of the best earphones in its price range by CNET.

The earphones contain single dynamic and two balanced armature drivers (Knowles BAs in the case of the F9 Pro) and come with two cables that use the standard MMCX connectors.

Overall, both the F9 and F9 Pro received highly positive reviews; however, some criticism was aimed at the MMCX connectors.

== Sound, design and accessories ==
F9 and F9 Pro have V-shaped yet reasonably well-balanced signature with increased bass and utilize almost identical technological designs. Both F9 and F9 Pro have a three-driver design with a single 9.2mm dynamic driver and two balanced armature drivers, however, F9 Pro employs Knowles TWFK-30017-000 balanced armature drivers, which results in further improvement of sound quality.

Both versions come with two replaceable 1.2-meter cables; one is a standard MMCX 3.5mm TRRS with an inline mic and controls made with tin-plated copper, and the other is MMCX 2.5mm balanced cable made with woven core 5N purity oxygen-free copper, for use with some models of Astell & Kern portable music players as well as FiiO's players, DACs and amplifiers such as Q1 Mark II DAC & AMP.

The earphones' structural design includes ridges inspired by ripples that occur in water. The ridges were utilized for better aesthetics, improvement of structural strength while creating more space inside, securing the drivers better and eliminating internal resonances in sound.

F9 Pro comes with a hard waterproof carrying case and a water-resistant neoprene carrying case and includes 12 sets of tips, three bore sizes of silicone, and three sets of memory foam tips. In addition, the F9 earphones come in grey and red, whereby F9 Pro comes in titanium color.

== Reception ==
Steve Guttenberg reviewed the Fiio F9 for CNET, remarking favorably on its build quality and design: "Build quality and design are first rate, frankly the best I've seen for the money." He also remarked favorably on the sound mentioning that bass is bold and stereo imaging is wide open. However, he added: "It won't please persnickety audiophiles" who are looking for an absolutely neutral and clinical sound. He said: "The F9 was a pleasure to listen to with well-recorded music, the sound was positively vivid, lively, and fun. The bass was terrific, and there was lots of it, but it was well-behaved and tuneful."

Gabby Bloch reviewed the Fiio F9 Pro for MajorHiFi, remarking favorably on the bass: "The lows might be the defining quality of the FiiO F9 PRO. While I wouldn't call these headphones incredibly bass heavy, they do a fantastic job in the bass department." He also noted that the imaging is precise, however, soundstage doesn't have much width. He concluded: "But in general, these F9 PRO are great value for money and can compete with the higher priced market."

Berkhan reviewed the F9 Pro for Headfonia. Referencing his earlier F9 review, Berkhan noted the additional content: "The F9 Pro has a secondary zipped case other than the weatherproof case provided and this is a nice addition... Another addition is that foam tips are provided, and this is really nice if you like foams like me, and I think the F9 Pro blends very well with them." He discussed sound quality: "The difference between the F9 and the FiiO F9 Pro lies in the Balanced Armature drivers. FiiO managed to get the Knowles BA drivers and put them inside the Pro. I was a little skeptical about whether these drivers would make a big difference or not but in the end, it actually turned out to be a bigger difference than how I imagined it." After a detailed description of the sound signature, he concluded with, "I recommend everyone to skip the F9 and get the F9 Pro. It's really interesting to see how much the brand of the drivers makes this kind of an impact on sound."

== See also ==
- FiiO X3 Portable Music Player
- Astell & Kern
