= Ewart Farvis =

Scottish electronics engineer (1911–2005)

William Ewart John Farvis (12 December 1911 – 12 October 2005) was a pioneering electronics engineer and educator. His war-time service was in electronic countermeasures. In his subsequent career at the University of Edinburgh he initiated the Department of Electrical Engineering, establishing its capabilities in silicon device processing and enhancing industrial interactions through Wolfson Microelectronics.

== Education ==
Ewart Farvis was born in Bristol and schooled there. He then studied at the University of Bristol, graduating BSc (Eng) in 1936 with First Class Honours in Electrical Engineering.

== Career ==
In 1937, he was appointed Lecturer in Electrical Engineering at University College, Swansea until called away to war service in the scientific civil service. Here he first extended the chain-home radars to detect low flying targets. He subsequently met with Churchill's scientific adviser, R V Jones, and assisted in detecting the signals from the enemy navigator aids used to direct bombers on to target. Farvis led the interception group, with Martin Ryle in charge of the associated radio jamming group, all coordinated by Robert Cockburn.

One of Farvis’ major wartime achievements was to counteract a sophisticated new German navigation aid, "Benito", with Alex Harley Reeves, the later inventor of pulse code modulation telephony. Farvis went to London with the new radio jammer and, on listening to the German bombers’ radio telephone traffic, he noted that they suspected equipment malfunction, rather than intentional jamming. After the war, Farvis debriefed these German equipment designers.

Academic appointments at the University of Edinburgh followed in 1948 as a lecturer in Applied Electricity. Here his research focussed on the then fashionable topic of gaseous electronics. He was closely associated in ionospheric research with Edward Appleton when he was University Principal. In 1961, Farvis became the first Professor and Head of the new Department of Electrical Engineering. Following this, his interests moved into the rapidly expanding field of solid-state electronics. In 1964, he took the bold move to construct a centre for solid-state devices and materials science research at Edinburgh and constructed the first university cleanrooms for silicon semiconductor device fabrication. he was an early pioneer in identifying the significance of semiconductor transistors for application in future electronic systems.

In 1969, Farvis set up of the Wolfson Microelectronics Liaison Unit (WMLU), coinciding with the first appointment of part-time paid visiting Professors in a UK university. WMLU later expanded into an independent company, Wolfson Microelectronics, under Professor David Milne before being acquired by Cirrus Logic.

Many of his post-war innovations in the undergraduate curriculum were tried out at Edinburgh before catching on elsewhere, including: open book examinations, individual experimental project work, and in-depth dissertation writing. He was innovative in moving the final honours’ examinations from June to January, to improve the student focus on project work.

He retired in 1977 after 29 years of university service.

== Committee activities ==
Ewart Farvis had a record of service in national policy-forming via: the Electrical Industries' Training Board, the Science Research Council and the Institution of Electrical Engineers. Farvis served on numerous committees: the Council of Engineering Institutions Board of Moderators; UNESCO International Working Group on Continuing Education; and as President of the Education & Training Committee of the Fédération Européenne d‘Associations Nationales d’Ingénieurs FEANI from 1974- 1977.

== Honours and awards ==
He was elected to Fellow of the Royal Society of Edinburgh in 1958 and was appointed OBE in 1972 and CBE in 1978.
