= FiiO X3 Portable Music Player =

FiiO X3
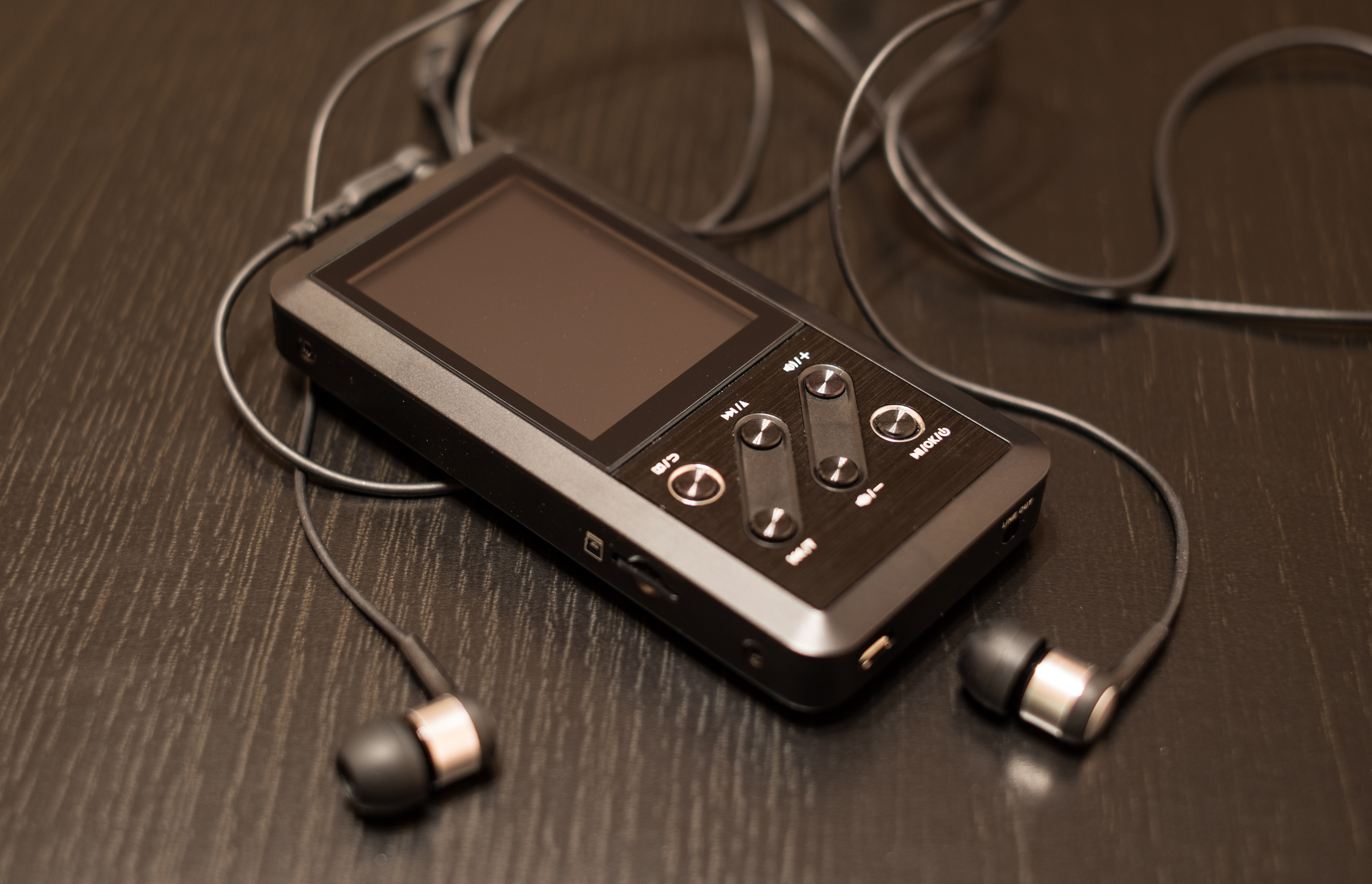
- Manufacturer: FiiO Electronics Technology
- Product family: FiiO X Series
- Type: Digital media, Portable media player, USB audio interface
- Introductory price: USD $299
- System on a chip: Ingenic JZ4760B
- CPU: XBurst1 (MIPS32)
- Memory: 128MiB
- Storage: 8GB internal
- Removable storage: microSD slot accepts SD, SDHC, and SDXC cards up to 128GB
- Display: TFT LCD 240×320
- Graphics: Vivante GC200
- Sound: Wolfson WM8740 DAC; Three 3.5 mm TRS audio output jacks
- Input: Physical buttons
- Connectivity: USB 2.0
- Power: 3100 mAh Li-Ion battery
- Dimensions: 1.6 x 5.5 x 10.9 cm
- Weight: 122 g
- Website: www.fiio.com.cn

FiiO X3 is a digital music player manufactured and marketed by FiiO Electronics Technology. The player utilizes a built-in Wolfson DAC, and is capable of reproducing music sampled at 192 kHz with a sample size of 24-bits per channel, in addition to functioning as a USB audio interface. The X3 is a mid-level member of the FiiO X Series of portable music players. It supports major lossy music formats such as MP3, and lossless music formats such as FLAC.

The player received positive reviews, being described as an "affordable and terrific sounding" music player by CNET. Praise was given for its quality to price ratio; however, it received criticism for its interface and button placement.

== Design and specifications ==
The player features a built-in Wolfson WM8740 digital-to-analog converter (DAC), a 2.4-inch TFT LCD, and a 3100mAH lithium polymer battery which allows 10 hours of playtime. It offers two 3.5mm analog stereo outputs, as well as 3.5mm coaxial digital outputs. The X3 comes with 8GB of internal storage and includes an expansion slot for microSD cards for capacities of up to 128GB. It is enclosed in a black solid metal case and has roughly the same size as an iPod Classic.

The X3 comes with a coaxial adaptor, silicone case, screen protectors, and a micro USB cable used to charge the device.

== Features ==
The FiiO X3 is capable of playing MP3 files as well as lossless formats such as FLAC, WAV, WMA, Monkey's Audio (APE), AAC, Ogg Vorbis and ALAC. It is also possible to connect the player to a PC with Windows, Mac, Linux OSes and devices in order to function as a USB DAC. With its built-in Wolfson WM8740, the FiiO X3 can drive headphones with any impedance ranging from 16 to 300 ohms. The player also offers gapless playback, and hardware (non-DSP) bass and treble controls. It has a simple UI with a generic file browser. The X3 can work with most major library managers such as Media Monkey, Windows Media Player and Winamp.

== Sound ==Los Angeles Times noted that the player's sound quality was superior to similarly priced music players, portable players included.

CNET wrote that high-resolution music 96 kHz and 192 kHz/24 FLAC sounded remarkable on the X3. The reviewer argued the sound on the X3 was "more complete and realistic" than that of the iPod. "Bass definition firmed up [...] after I spent a few hours with the X3 the iPod sounded rather bland and boring."

Headfonics commented about the sound presentation: "a nice warm laid back tonality with next to no background noise or hiss for sensitive earphones, a well defined mid section, good tight bass without being too dominant (you can EQ that if you wish) and a slightly rolled off treble." The reviewer noted a hiss-free background.

Hi-Fi World noted that FiiO X3 can potentially deliver better sound quality than any CD, as well as far better sound than portables like the iPod. According to their measurements that were performed at 3V through the headphone socket at high gain the X3 had "50% more output than most CD players, and ten times more output than most portables." However, it was noted that using an external amplifier, such as the Audiolab Q-DAC, allowed for higher quality sound than that of the player's internal amplifier. The magazine also commented about playing high-res music files, noting it "conveys the intrinsic quality of high resolution digital audio files well."

== Reception ==
Los Angeles Times' music critic Mark Swed wrote that the X3 is a better alternative to the iPod, and that it utilizes the same built-in digital-to-analog converter which is found in much more expensive players; Astell & Kern models, for example, which are being sold for $699 and $1,299. However, he noted that the X3 is "thicker and clunkier" than an iPod Touch. He concluded that while the FiiO X3 may not have Astell & Kern's "sweet and open sound", its price-quality ratio was superior.

Steve Guttenberg of CNET said "FiiO's nifty $200 portable high-resolution music player is a knockout," writing that it sounds "sweet" with MP3s. He also noted it "smashed the price barrier," saying that "the FiiO X3 is the one to get if you, like me, have been waiting for a music player to take your sound to the next level." He noted however, that the X3 can't match the Classic's 160GB storage capability, as it offers only 8GB of internal storage.

The Gadgeteer's Bill Henderson wrote that the X3 supports more music formats and higher resolutions than iPod. However, he noted that the front face of the X3 "is a confusing array of buttons" and that the screen's resolution is low, although readable. He praised FiiO for releasing software updates that improve the X3's various aspects, as well as the support for external storage.

Headfonics noted that the player offers good quality to price ratio.

== 2nd Generation ==
In April 2015, FiiO released an updated version of the X3 (X3II). It was revealed at CES 2015. Review samples were sent out as X3K, but upon release the name was changed. Apart from a radically updated casing and interface, reminiscent of FiiO X1, it adds hardware DSD support and a better DAC (Cirrus CS4398) for a comparable price. The second generation's design also incorporates dual crystal oscillators in order to ensure precise, artifact-free sound reproduction.

== 3rd Generation ==
The FiiO X3 Mark III has a redesigned case and button layout and supports Bluetooth and a balanced output.
