= Pono (digital music service) =

Failed high-resolution audio download service

Pono Music
- Discontinued: April 2017
- Platforms: OS X, Windows, online

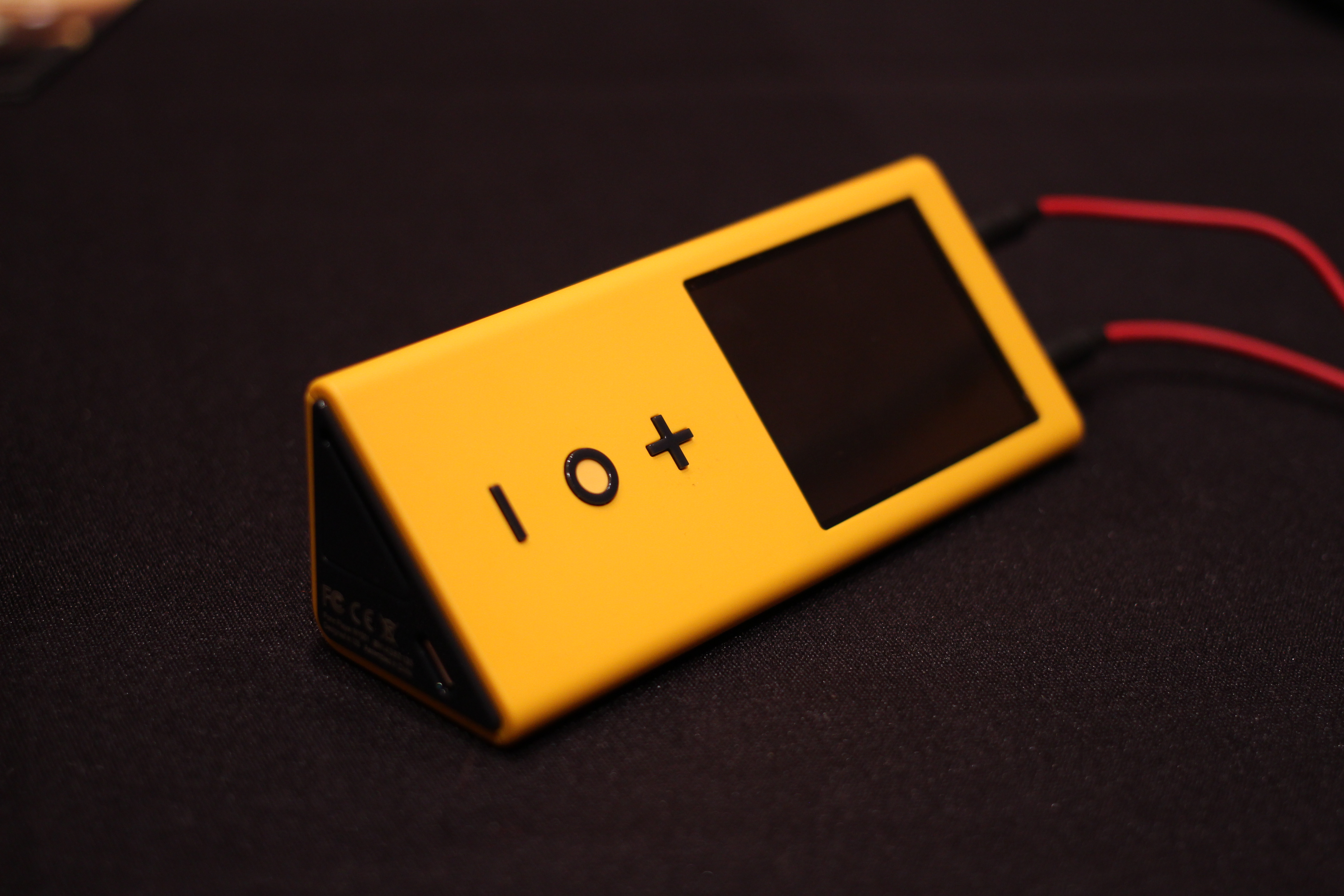
A Pono Player device

Pono (/ˈpoʊnoʊ/, Hawaiian word for "proper") was a portable digital media player and music download service for high-resolution audio. It was developed by musician Neil Young and his company PonoMusic, which raised money for development and initial production through a crowd-funding campaign on Kickstarter. Production and shipments to backers started in October 2014, and shipments to the general public began in the first quarter of 2015.

Pono's stated goal to present songs "as they first sound during studio recording sessions", using "high-resolution" 24-bit 192kHz audio instead of "the compressed audio inferiority that MP3s offer" received mixed reactions, with some describing Pono as a competitor to similar music services such as HDtracks, but others doubting its potential for success.

In April 2017 it was announced that Pono was discontinued, and alternative plans were later abandoned.

== Background ==
Writing in his book Waging Heavy Peace, Young expressed concern about digital audio quality, criticizing in particular the quality offered by Apple's iTunes Store. "My goal is to try and rescue the art form that I've been practicing for the past 50 years," he said.

=== Founding ===
PonoMusic was founded in 2012 by Young, along with Silicon Valley entrepreneur John Hamm as the company's CEO. The name was derived from pono (pronounced [ˈpono]), a Hawaiian word for "righteousness."

Pono reportedly had backing from, and had signed a full agreement, with Warner. In September 2012, Young appeared on the Late Show with David Letterman with a prototype of the player, and confirmed backing from Warner, as well as major record labels Sony, and Universal. Young claimed that Pono would provide "the finest quality, highest-resolution digital music from major labels as well as prominent independent labels" using the FLAC audio file format.

On March 12, 2014, the company with the help of Alex Daly and her crowdfunding consultancy Vann Alexandra, launched a successful crowdfunding campaign on Kickstarter that surpassed its target in one day. PonoMusic raised $6.2 million via pre-orders for the player by the end of the campaign.

In June 2014, Young assumed the title of CEO of Pono Music. In August 2014, PonoMusic turned to Crowdfunder to raise more equity. They closed with a total financing of $4 million. While many more international investors were interested, they had to be turned away due to regulatory restrictions. The Pono player and music store was officially launched in January 2015.

By June 2015, however, Variety Magazine reported that PonoMusic struggled with funding issues, which had slowed the company's expansion. Prior to June 2015, Young had sought financial backing from Donald Trump.

=== Pono products ===
PonoMusic's products are based on the FLAC audio format, which the company re-branded as Pono audio format. The player device, called the PonoPlayer, was initially priced at $399 and came with a maximum of 128GB of memory (64GB built-in plus 64GB on MicroSD card). The press release noted that the PonoPlayer, developed in collaboration with Ayre Acoustics, could store "100 to 500 high-resolution digital-music albums". PonoMusic was the device's accompanying desktop-based media management system, which allowed customers to download and sync music to the player. The online PonoMusic store sold downloadable music.

=== System demise ===
On July 17, 2016, PonoMusic announced that it would be temporarily shut down due to the acquisition of their bankrupt content partner, Omnifone, by Apple Inc. They further stated that during this shutdown period, PonoMusic would be transitioning to a new platform provided by 7digital. The website, however, has been in a non-operating "under construction" state since then.

In April 2017, Young announced the PonoMusic store was being discontinued, but with future plans to transition the service from a download model to a high-resolution streaming service to be known as "Xstream". As of October 2019, however, the service had yet to launch, and there have been no further announcements regarding its future.

== Ecosystem ==
The Pono "ecosystem" had the following components:

1. A portable music player, the PonoPlayer, costing $399 with 64 GB of internal storage. The player also supported removable MicroSD cards up to 128GB. Thus, the total capacity was 64GB with no MicroSD card inserted, or more depending on the size and the MicroSD card. The cards can be swapped to allow for a larger selection of data. The press release notes that the PonoPlayer, developed in collaboration with Ayre Acoustics, can store "100 to 500 high-resolution digital-music albums".
2. The PonoMusic online music store, which would sell earbud and headphone products suitable for use with the PonoPlayer device.
3. The PonoMusic App, the accompanying desktop-based "media-management" software, which would allow customers to download and sync music to the player.

== Reception ==
A 2012 Rolling Stone report on Pono relayed generally positive anticipation, but quoted musician Jim James as asking, "I've already bought Aretha Franklin's 'Respect' a lot of times. Do I have to buy it again?"

Press reaction to Pono announcements in March 2014, was generally skeptical: approving of the idea of good sound, but questioning the viability of a standalone player in a market that had moved largely to smartphones and increasingly towards music streaming. Several commentators suggested that the key to improved sound lay largely in music engineering and mastering practices, rather than in file formats and players.

In the wake of its launch at the Consumer Electronics Show in January 2015, Pono received mixed reviews. Yahoo Tech's David Pogue conducted a blind test with 15 volunteers aged 17 to 55 comparing Pono Music downloads (FLAC format) played on a Pono Player with iTunes downloads (AAC format) played on an iPhone; he found that the participants did not prefer Pono. A subsequent (subjective, non-ABX) review in the Stereophile magazine, deemed the Pono Player's performance superior to more expensive components and players with the reviewer saying "I am pleased to report that CD rips sounded excellent through the player."

== See also ==
- Comparison of online music stores
