= Alexander Carnegie Kirk =

British engineer

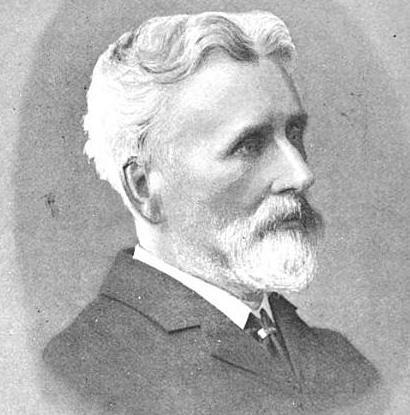
Alexander C. Kirk

Alexander Carnegie Kirk (16 July 1830 – 5 October 1892) was a British engineer responsible for several major innovations in the shipbuilding, refrigeration, and oil shale industries of the 19th century. Kirk, born in Barry, Angus, received his formal education at the University of Edinburgh and a technical education at plants operated by Robert Napier and Sons.

== Family ==
Alexander Carnegie Kirk was the eldest son of Rev. John Kirk (died 1858) and Christian Guthrie, née Carnegie, (died 1865). The naturalist John Kirk was his younger brother. A.C. Kirk married Ada Waller at Croydon in 1869 and they had six children.

== Career ==
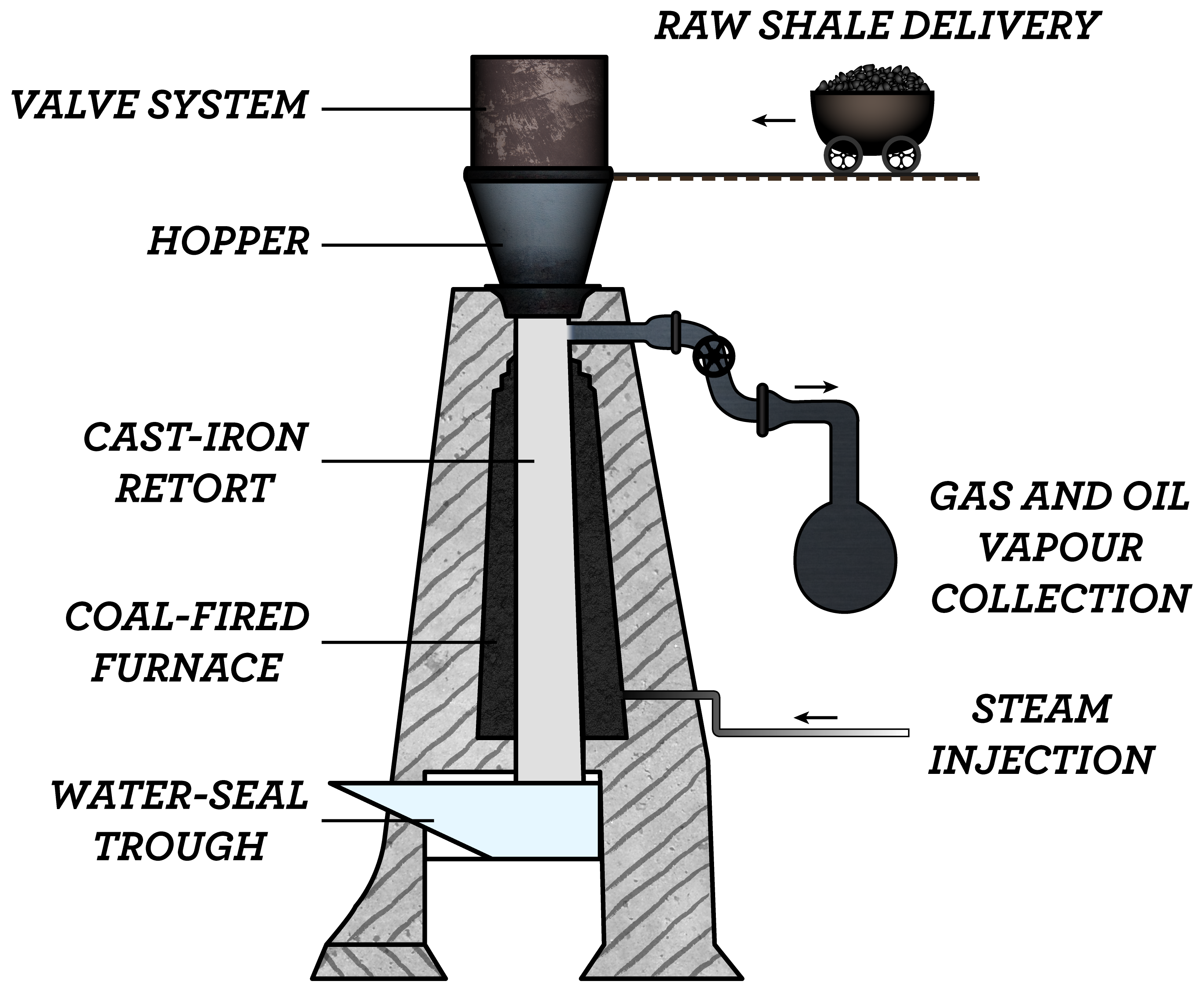
Kirk's retort

In 1850, Kirk began a five-year apprenticeship with Robert Napier and Sons. In 1861, he became chief draughtsman at Maudslay, Sons and Field in London but this seems to have lasted less than a year. Later in 1861 he became an engineering manager in the shale-oil industry, working for James Young. During this employment he developed an oil shale retort and a refrigeration technology, involving the delivery of ether. The latter was to address production problems stemming from summer heat. In 1865 he joined the management of James Aitken and Company, an engine works in Glasgow. In 1870 he was appointed manager of the John C. Elder engineering works. After returning to the Napier firm as a senior partner in 1877, his work was thereafter focused on marine engineering. His triple-expansion engines as designed for the steamship Propontis were unsuccessful, but his subsequent versions of the engine design, particularly those designed for the steamship Aberdeen, are credited as technological breakthroughs.

== Professional appointments ==
He served as the President of The Institution of Engineers and Shipbuilders in Scotland from 1887 to 1889.

== Honours ==
In 2020 he was inducted into the Scottish Engineering Hall of Fame.

== See also ==
- Alexander Selligue
- James Young (Scottish chemist)
- Pumpherston retort
