= Fio =

Fio or FIO may refer to:

- Fio Zanotti (born 1949), Italian record producer
- FIO (software), the flexible IO tester created by Jens Axboe
- Florida Institute of Oceanography
- Fraction of inspired oxygen
- Flexible IO
- National Federation Of Industrial Organisations, former Japanese trade union federation
- Pemoline, a stimulant
- The East Slavic name format of family name, given name and patronymic (Russian: фамилия, имя, отчество – ФИО)
- Free In and Out, maritime freight rate term

== See also ==
- Fiio
