= Adam S. T. Thomson =

Scottish engineer

Adam Simpson Turnbull Thomson (1908–2000) was a Scottish engineer and university administrator, serving as the first Vice Principal of Strathclyde University. As an engineer he was involved in rocket research.

== Life ==
He was born on 10 August 1908 in Barrhead. He was educated at Spier's School in Beith. He then attended the Royal Technical College in Glasgow, training as a Mechanical Engineer. He joined the staff of the college in 1930. He gained a doctorate (PhD) in 1938.

In the Second World War from 1940 he was seconded as Deputy Chief Designer of the Projectile Development Establishment at Aberporth on the Welsh coast, becoming Director of the Establishment in 1943. He returned to the RTC in 1945 and in 1946 replaced Professor William Kerr as Professor of Mechanical Engineering. He was one of the moving figures of giving the college university status (through a major expansion) which came to fruition in August 1964, the college thereafter being known as Strathclyde University and Thompson serving as Vice Principal.

From 1963 to 1965 he served as President of the Institution of Engineers and Shipbuilders in Scotland.

In 1964 he was elected a Fellow of the Royal Society of Edinburgh. His proposers were Patrick Dunbar Ritchie, Sir Samuel Curran, George Hibberd and Donald Pack. In 1976 he received his third doctorate (LLD).

He retired to Ayr and died there on 20 October 2000.

== Family ==
In 1940 he married Margaret Campbell Templeton. They had two children, Eileen and Neil.
