= South of Scotland Electricity Board =

Electric utility in Scotland, 1955–1991

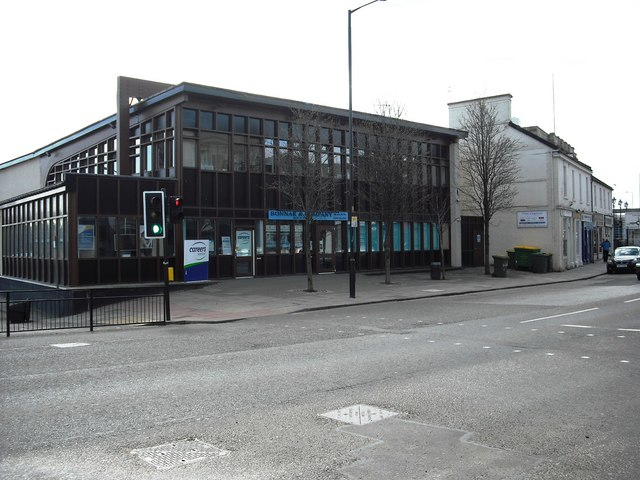
- Former SSEB showroom, built in the 1960s
- Formerly: South West Scotland Electricity Board, South East Scotland Electricity Board
- Type: Government body
- Industry: Electricity generation and supply
- Founded: 1 April 1955; 71 years ago
- Founder: Act of Parliament: Electricity Reorganisation (Scotland) Act 1954
- Defunct: 1991; 35 years ago
- Fate: Privatisation
- Successor: Scottish Nuclear, Scottish Power
- Headquarters: Glasgow
- Area served: South of Scotland
- Key people: Sir John Sydney Pickles (Chairman)
- Products: Electric power
- Production output: 22,321 GWh (1989)
- Services: Generation and supply of electricity
- Net income: £32.225 million (1987)
- Total assets: Electricity generating stations and transmission system
- Owner: UK Government (Secretary of State for Scotland)
- Number of employees: 12,008 (1989)
- Parent: UK Government
- Divisions: Distribution areas (see text)

The South of Scotland Electricity Board (SSEB) generated, transmitted and distributed electricity throughout the south of Scotland, including the former regions of Strathclyde, Lothian, Fife, Central, Borders and Dumfries and Galloway and a few towns in northern England. It operated from 1955 to 1991.

== History ==
As established by the Electricity Act 1947 there were two British Electricity Authority divisions responsible for the generation of electricity in Scotland based in Glasgow and Edinburgh. There were also two area boards for distribution of electricity responsible to the British Electricity Authority and to the Minister of Fuel and Power. It was thought by the industry and government that a single board for the South of Scotland would be better placed to cover the whole area and would provide administrative advantages such as simplification. The South of Scotland would then be in line with the North of Scotland which was covered by the North of Scotland Hydro-Electric Board for both the generation and distribution of electricity. The new arrangement would provide a more efficient service and better match Scotland's needs.

The Electricity Reorganisation (Scotland) Act 1954 transferred to the Secretary of State for Scotland the responsibility for electricity matters in Scotland and established the South of Scotland Electricity Board, a new public authority for the generation and distribution of electricity in the South of Scotland. Scotland was given control of its own electricity undertakings, and the responsibility for adequate performance became the responsibility of the Secretary of State for Scotland. On 1 April 1955, South West Scotland Electricity Board and South East Scotland Electricity Board were merged into the South of Scotland Electricity Board.

The board operated conventional coal-fired steam stations, hydro-electric stations and nuclear power stations.

The board was dissolved in 1991 as a consequence of the Electricity Act 1989 which privatised the British electricity industry.

=== Existing electricity suppliers taken over at nationalisation ===
The Electricity (Allocation of Undertakings to Area Boards) Order 1948 (SI 1948/484) transferred the electricity business of the following local authorities and private companies to the new boards effective 31 March 1948.

==== South West Scotland Electricity Board ====
===== Local authorities =====
- Airdrie Corporation
- Ayrshire Electricity Board
- Coatbridge Corporation
- Dumbarton Corporation
- Dumfries Corporation
- Dumfriesshire County Council
- Dunbartonshire County Council
- Glasgow Corporation
- Greenock Corporation
- Hamilton Corporation
- Helensburgh Corporation
- Kirkcudbright County Council
- Lanarkshire County Council
- Motherwell and Wishaw Corporation
- Paisley Corporation

===== Private companies =====
- Clyde Valley Electrical Power Company
- Electric Supply Corporation
- Galloway Water Power Company
- Lanarkshire Hydro Electric Power Company
- Skelmorlie Electric Supply Company
- Strathclyde Electricity Supply Company
- Wigtownshire Electricity Company

==== South East Scotland Electricity Board ====
===== Local authorities =====
- Borrowstounness Corporation
- Denny and Dunipace Corporation
- Edinburgh Corporation
- Falkirk Corporation
- Kirkcaldy Corporation
- North Berwick Corporation
- Stirling Corporation
- West Lothian County Council

===== Private companies =====
- Fife Electric Power Company
- Lothians Electric Power Company
- Musselburgh and District Electric Light and Traction Company
- Scottish Central Electric Power Company
- Scottish Midlands Electricity Supply Ltd.
- Scottish Southern Electric Supply Company

== Constitution ==
The 1954 act specified the management board was to comprise a chairman and not less than four and not more than eight members. All appointments to the board were to be made by the Secretary of State for Scotland.

The Board's headquarters were at Sauchiehall Street and Inverlair Avenue Glasgow.

=== Chairmen ===
==== South East Scotland Electricity Board ====
- 1948–1955: Sir Robert Norman Duke, KBE, CB, DSO, MC

==== South West Scotland Electricity Board ====
- 1948–1955: Sir John Sydney Pickles, MIEE

==== South of Scotland Electricity Board ====
- 1955–1962: Sir John Sydney Pickles, MIEE
- 1962–1967: Sir Norman Randall Elliott, CBE
- 1967–1973: Charles Lewis Cuthbert Allen, FICE, FIEE
- 1974–1977: Sir Francis Leonard Tombs, FREng (later Baron Tombs)
- 1977–1982: Donald Roy Berridge, CBE
- 1982–1991: Sir Donald John Miller

== Electricity generation ==
Electricity generated by the board was from coal-fired steam power stations, hydro-electric stations, and from 1964 from nuclear power stations.

=== Steam power stations ===
Outline details of the Steam power stations of the South of Scotland Electricity Board in 1958 are as follows:

Steam power stations of the South of Scotland Electricity Board (1958)
Power station	Location	Steam raising capacity of boilers, 1000 lb/hr	Generating sets	Total generating capacity, MW	Steam condenser, tower or water course, water flowrate
Barony	Cumnock Ayrshire	300	1 × 30 MW	30	Cooling tower 3 million gallons per hour (mgph)
Bonnybridge	Stirlingshire	690	1 × 5 MW, 2 × 12.5 MW, 2 × 20 MW	70	Cooling tower 3.35 mgph
Braehead	Renfew	2,100	4 × 50 MW	200	River Clyde
Clyde's Mill	Cambuslang Glasgow	2,124	2 × 18.75 MW, 8 × 30 MW	277.5	Cooling tower 3.0 mgph
Dalmarnock	Glasgow	2,360	2 × 18.75 MW, 2 × 50 MW, 1 × 60 MW	197.5	River Clyde
Dunfermline	Fife	154	1 × 4 MW, 1× 6 MW, 1 × 3 MW	13	Townhill Loch
Falkirk	Stirlingshire	85	1 × 1.5 MW, 2 × 3 MW	7.5	Cooling tower 0.4 mgph
Ferguslie	Paisley	144	2 × 5 MW, 2 × 3 MW	16.25	Cooling trough 0.76 mgph
Galashiels	Selkirkshire	67	1 × 1.875 MW, 1 × 3.75 MW	5.625	Rivers Gala and Tweed

The Board commissioned large coal-fired stations such as the 760 MW Kincardine power station (1958), the 1200 MW Inverkip (1967), the 1200 MW Cockenzie power station (1967), and the 2400 MW Longannet power station (1970).

=== Hydro-electric power stations ===
Outline details of the Hydro-electric power stations of the South of Scotland Electricity Board in 1958 are as follows:

Hydro-electric power stations of the South of Scotland Electricity Board (1958)
Power station	Location	Commissioned	Head of water, feet	Generating sets	Generating capacity, MW	Electrical Output (1958), GWh
Bonnington	Lanark Lanarkshire	1937	189	2 × 4.92 MW	9.84	55.478
Carsfad	Castle Douglas Kirkcudbrightshire	1936	65	2 × 6 MW	12	18.234
Earlstoun	Castle Douglas Kirkcudbrightshire	1936		2 × 6 MW	12	21.821
Glenlee	Castle Douglas Kirkcudbrightshire	1935	380	2 × 12 MW	25	46.72
Kendoon	Castle Douglas Kirkcudbrightshire	1936	150	2 × 10.5 MW	21	44.467
Stonebyres	Lanark Lanarkshire		97	2 × 2.84 MW	5.68	28.474
Tongland	Tongland Kirkcudbrightshire	1935		3 × 11 MW	33.25	74.175

=== Nuclear power stations ===
The South of Scotland Electricity Board commissioned three nuclear power stations.

South of Scotland nuclear power stations
Power station	Reactor type	Output	Construction	Commissioned	Closed	Status
Hunterston A	Magnox	2 x 180 MWe	1957	1964	March 1990	Decommissioning
Hunterston B	AGR	2 x 610 MWe	1968	1976	January 2022	Defuelling
Torness	AGR	2 x 682 MWe	1980	1988	–	Operational

== Transmission ==
The supply of electricity was by high voltage cables. In 1958 there were 170 miles of transmission line operating at 275 kV and 841 miles at 132 kV. They connected 20 power stations and 44 transforming stations. There were connections to the North of Scotland grid system and to England via the 275 kV Clyde's Mill to Carlisle line. By April 1989 there were 526 km of 400 kV lines; 1,565 km of 275 kV lines; 1,642 km of 132 kV lines; and 80,256 km of less than 132 kV lines.

== Distribution areas ==
Electricity supply to customers was through eight Distribution Areas. The supply and other key data for 1956 were as follows:

South of Scotland Electricity Board distribution areas (1958)
Distribution area	Electricity supplied to grid, MWh	Max demand, MW	Electricity sold 1956, GWh	Consumers
Ayrshire	558,761	116,180	409,298	107,194
Clyde	1,021,442	240,170	848,830	194,048
Dumfries and Galloway	249,980	57,820	195,309	46,774
Edinburgh and Borders	1,074,638	240,000	858,571	242,449
Fife	463,369	86,550	337,321	98,189
Glasgow	1,232,475	301,880	1,034,764	265,802
Lanarkshire	1,334,684	278,250	1,182601	216096
Stirling	608,293	109,200	432,119	95,807

== Operating data 1949 to 1989 ==
Key operating data for the South of Scotland Electricity Board is summarised in the table.

Key operating data for the South of Scotland Electricity Board
Year	Total output capacity, MW	Maximum demand, MW	Customers, thousands	Employees	Capital expenditure, £ million	Net profit, £ million
1949	885		956	8945	2.8	0.787
1959	1656	1750	1342	12758	27.4	0.097
1969	3837	3574	1478	15121	61.0	0.632
1976	6082	3925	1550	13941	70.2	2.720
1977	7183	4307	1564	13672	55.2	22.286
1978	7572	4228	1569	13632	42.7	5.618
1979	7418	4496	1576	13730	52.5	9.532
1980	7826	4225	1585	13658	64.7	0.099
1981	7826	4106	1956	13624	128.5	16.531
1982	6316	4733	1605	13005	287.4	17.231
1983	6356	4009	1614	12720	316.5	44.101
1984	6188	4052	1628	12307	407.5	42.567
1985	6250	4154	1642	12019	376.0	–11.94
1986	6230	4237	1655	12172	368.6	43.618
1987	6160	4406	1669	12339	364.3	32.225
1988	5518	4125	1682	12173	224.7	12.69
1989	6768	4026	1700	12008	158.3	1.424

Electricity supplied by the board, in GWh

== Dissolution ==
As a consequence of the Electricity Act 1989, which privatised the British electricity industry, the nuclear assets of the South of Scotland Electricity Board were transferred to Scottish Nuclear.

In January 1990 a reactor at the Hunterston A Magnox Power Station was shut down. The second reactor was shut down on 31 March 1990, the day before the nuclear generation assets (Hunterston A, Hunterston B and Torness Power Stations) were vested with Scottish Nuclear.

The remainder of the assets were privatised as ScottishPower in 1991 and the South of Scotland Electricity Board was dissolved.

== See also ==
- Energy policy of the United Kingdom
- Energy use and conservation in the United Kingdom
- Companies merged into South East Scotland Electricity Board
- Companies merged into South West Scotland Electricity Board
- North of Scotland Hydro-electric Board
