= FiiO X Series =

Line of portable media players

- Manufacturer: FiiO Electronics Technology
- Type: Digital media, Portable media player, USB audio interface
- System on a chip: Ingenic JZ4760B or Rockchip RK3188
- CPU: XBurst1 (MIPS32) or Cortex A9 (ARMv7)
- Removable storage: microSD slot accepts SD, SDHC, and SDXC cards up to 128 GB
- Input: Physical buttons
- Connectivity: USB 2.0
- Power: Li-Ion rechargeable battery
- Website: www.fiio.com.cn

The FiiO X Series is a line of portable music players designed and manufactured by the Chinese company FiiO Electronics Technology.

== Models ==
- All models support digital audio sampled up to 192 kHz with samples of up to 24 bits.
- All models support the lossless audio formats FLAC, ALAC, Monkey's audio (APE), WMA Lossless, and WAV.
- All models support the lossy audio formats AAC, MP3, Ogg Vorbis, and WMA.
- All models support gapless playback and hardware (non DSP) bass and treble controls.

Model	Released	MSRP	Display		SoC	RAM	Storage		Battery Capacity	Audio Output	Connectivity		DAC	USB DAC	DSD Support	Dimensions	Weight
Model	Released	MSRP	Screen	Touchsceen	SoC	RAM	Internal Storage	microSD Slots	Battery Capacity	Audio Output	WiFi	Bluetooth	DAC	USB DAC	DSD Support	Dimensions	Weight
X1	2014	$100	TN 320x240	No	Ingenic JZ4760B Xburst1 (MIPS32)	—N/a	None	1	1700 mAh	Single 3.5 mm jack, headphone/line-level selectable	No	No	TI PCM5142	No	No	96.7 × 57.7 × 14.1 mm	106 g
X1 (Second Gen)	2016	$120	IPS 320x240	No	Ingenic JZ4760B Xburst1 (MIPS32)	—N/a	None	1	1800 mAh	Single 3.5 mm jack, headphone/line-level selectable	No	Yes	TI PCM5242	No	No	97 × 55.5 × 12 mm	102 g
X3	2013	$300	IPS 320x240	No	Ingenic JZ4760B Xburst1 (MIPS32)	—N/a	8 GB	1	3100 mAh	Three 3.5 mm jacks: headphone, line-level, digital	No	No	Wolfson WM8740	Yes	Yes	109 × 55 × 16 mm	122 g
X3 (Second Gen)	2015	$200	IPS 320x240	No	Ingenic JZ4760B Xburst1 (MIPS32)	—N/a	None	1	2600 mAh	Two 3.5 mm jacks, headphone, shared line-level/digital	No	No	Cirrus Logic CS4398	Yes	Yes	96.7 × 57.7 × 16.1 mm	135 g
X5	2014	$350	IPS 400x360	No	Ingenic JZ4760B Xburst1 (MIPS32)	—N/a	None	2	3700 mAh	Three 3.5 mm jacks: headphone, line-level, digital	No	No	TI PCM1792A	Yes	Yes	67.6 × 114 × 15.6 mm	195 g
X5 (Second Gen)	2015	$350	IPS 400x360	No	Ingenic JZ4760B Xburst1 (MIPS32)	—N/a	None	2	3300 mAh	Two 3.5 mm jacks, headphone, shared line-level/digital	No	No	TI PCM1792A	Yes	Yes	109 × 63.5 × 15.3 mm	165 g
X5 (Third Gen)	2017	$350	IPS 480x800	Yes	Rockchip RK3188 (ARMv7)	1 GB	32 GB	2	3400 mAh	Two 3.5 mm jacks: headphone, line-level/ digital One 2.5 mm jack: balanced headphone port	Yes	Yes	AK4490	Yes	Yes	114.2 × 66.2 × 14.8 mm	186 g
X7	2016	$550	IPS 480x800	Yes	Rockchip RK3188 (ARMv7)	1 GB	32 GB	1	3500 mAh	Two 3.5 mm jacks: headphone, line-level/ digital	Yes	Yes	ES9018S	Yes	Yes	130 × 64 × 16.6 mm	220 g
X7 Mark II	2017	$650	IPS 480x800	Yes	Rockchip RK3188 (ARMv7)	2 GB	64 GB	2	3800 mAh	Two 3.5 mm jacks: one for headphone, line-level/ digital one for shared LO/Coaxial out One 2.5 mm jack: balanced headphone port	Yes	Yes	ESS9028 PRO	Yes	Yes	128.7 × 67.2 × 15.5mm	212 g

== Reception ==
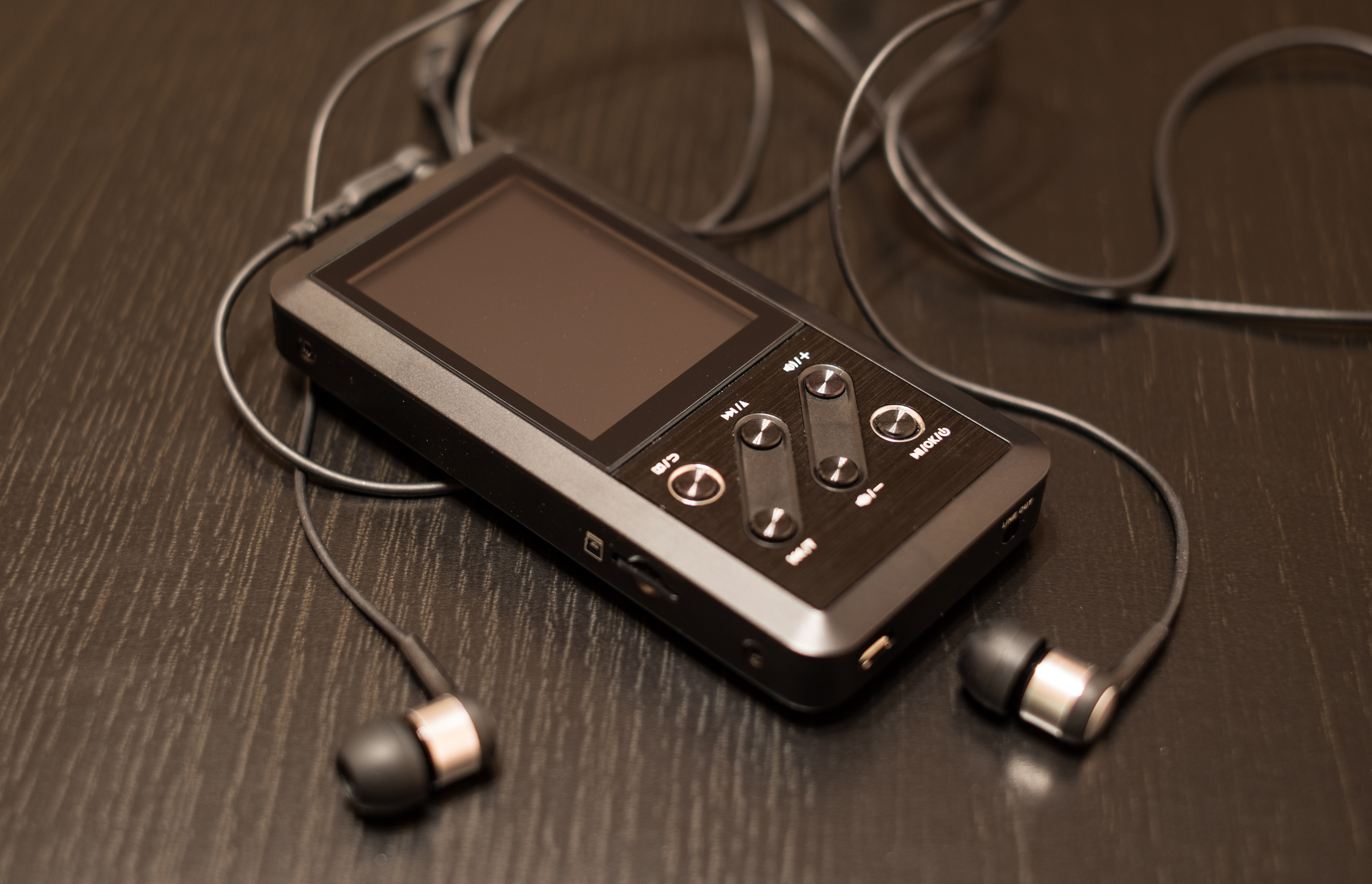
FiiO X3 with headphones

In reviewing the FiiO X3, Los Angeles Times' music critic Mark Swed concluded it is a better alternative to an iPod. Swed noted that the X3 utilizes that same digital-to-analog converter that is found in much more expensive players, such as Astell & Kern models that are being sold for $699 and $1,299. In his opinion the FiiO X3 may not have A&K's sweet and open sound, but it could be purchased for around $200 as of April, 2013.

Steve Guttenberg of CNET compared the FiiO X5 to the Apple iPod Classic and the not-yet-released PonoPlayer. He found the "iPod sounded vague and blurry next to the pristine X5" when playing identical ALAC audio files. The review also noted that the PonoPlayer plays fewer formats than the FiiO X series players, but costs more than the X3.

A review of the X3 in Hi-Fi World reported that the sound and amplification are good, but added that the interface was "least intuitive" and "inelegant." The conclusion was: "a fine budget starting point in high-resolution digital."

== X1 ==
The X1 features physical buttons and a spin wheel which "clicks" when rotated. Each "click" of the wheel moves the selected item up or down. There are three buttons on the side of the device, one is used to power up/down the device and put it in sleep mode, while the other two raised buttons function for volume. In addition, when in sleep mode and playing music, the volume up/down buttons can be used for skipping a song or going back a song in the selected album/playlist.
