= James Howden =

Scottish engineer and inventor (1832–1913)

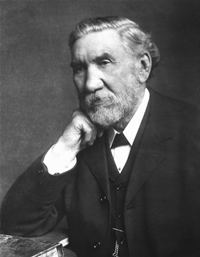
- Born: 29 February 1832; Prestonpans, East Lothian
- Died: 21 November 1913 (aged 81); Glasgow
- Occupations: Engineer and inventor

James Howden (29 February 1832 – 21 November 1913) was a Scottish engineer and inventor who is noted for his invention of the Howden forced draught system for steam boilers.

== Life ==
Howden was born in Prestonpans, East Lothian, in 1832, the son of James Howden and his wife, Catherine Cowden, and was educated at the local parish school. His first marriage was to Helen Burgess Adams, with whom he had one daughter, Catherine Spence Howden (1873–1925), and his second to Allison Moffat Hay, with whom he had two sons, James Howden (1883–1908) and William Hay Howden (1884–1943). His two wives both predeceased him, and he died in Glasgow in 1913.

== Career ==
Howden served as an apprentice from 1847 with James Gray & Co., a Glasgow engineering firm, passing through the various departments and eventually becoming chief draughtsman. Having finished his apprenticeship he started work first with Bell and Miller, the civil engineers, then with Robert Griffiths, who designed marine screw propellers.

In 1854, Howden launched himself as a consultant engineer and designer, his first major invention being a rivet-making machine. The selling of the patent rights to a company in Birmingham for this secured him financially and James Howden & Co. was established as a manufacturer of marine equipment. In 1857, Howden began work on the design and supply of boilers and steam engines for the marine industry; his first contract was with Hendersons to supply the Anchor Liner Ailsa Craig with a compound steam engine and water boilers, using steam at 100 lb pressure. That same year, together with Alexander Morton of Glasgow, he was awarded a patent for the "invention of improvements in obtaining motive power." On 28 February 1859, he applied for a patent for the "improvements in machinery, or apparatus for cutting, shaping, punching, and compressing metals." In 1860 he patented a method of preheating combustion air; his patent was granted for the invention of "improvements in steam engines and boilers, and in the apparatus connected therewith". In 1862, he decided to construct main boilers and engines to his own design and started manufacturing in his first factory on Scotland Street in Glasgow's Tradeston district. A breakthrough came in 1863 when he introduced a furnace mechanical draught system which used a steam turbine driven axial flow fan.

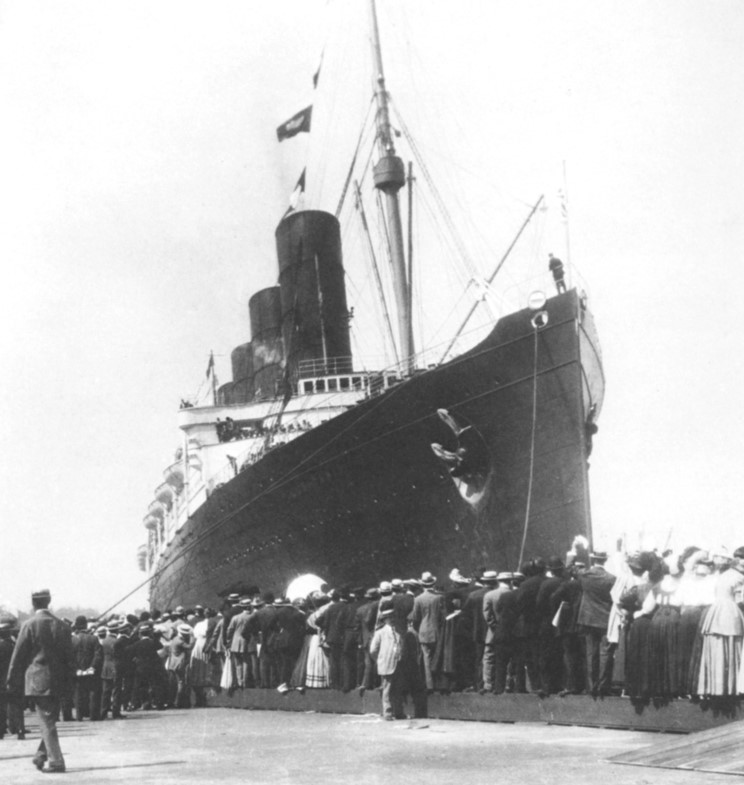
The Lusitania after her maiden voyage in 1907; she was one of a number of notable liners that used the Howden forced draught system.

Howden is chiefly remembered as the inventor of the Howden forced draught system, which forced heated waste gases into the combustion chamber by means of a fan and ductwork and which appeared in the 1880s. This system dramatically reduced the amount of coal used in ships' boilers. Howden patented this device in 1882 as the 'Howden System of Forced Draught' and during the 1880s more than 1000 boilers were converted to this specification or constructed to Howden's patent. The first vessel to use the system was the New York City, built in 1885. Amongst the liners to use the Howden system in their boilers were the Lusitania and Mauretania, the fastest liners in the world when they were built.

Howden's original Glasgow factory being too small for his expanding operation, he had a new, larger one designed by Nisbet Sinclair at 195 Scotland Street, down the road from his original factory. This opened in 1898 and featured overhead cranes, handling equipment and central-heating (a rarity at the time). As a result of an overflowing order book, the factory was enlarged, first in 1904, and again in 1912, to a design by Bryden & Robertson. As of 2009, this redbrick factory – "one of the last remaining Victorian heavy engineering works in Glasgow", and the place where the tunnel boring machines used in the excavation of the Channel Tunnel were made – lies empty.

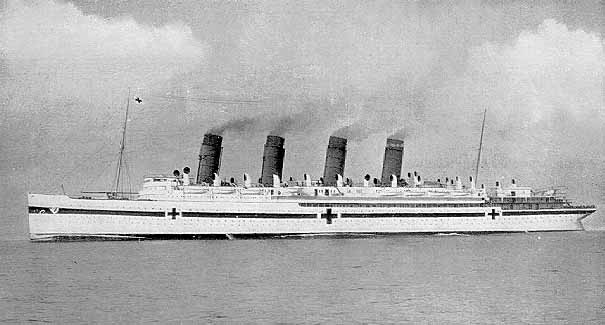
The Mauretania in World War I

In the 1900s, Howden designed a fully enclosed high-speed marine steam engine. This was later modified for use in land-based systems as the Howden-Zoelly steam turbine. At the onset of the First World War, a year after Howden's death, the Admiralty ruled that all ships were to be fitted with Howden "blowers" so that they could outrun U-boats.

Amongst the projects that Howden worked on were assisting the St Helena Whaling Company, quarrying marble in Greece and working on the design of a recoilless gun for the Admiralty.

Howden was the last surviving founder member of the Institution of Engineers and Shipbuilders in Scotland, founded in 1857. Although he was a lifelong Liberal, he took no part in politics or public life.

== Bibliography ==
- Munn, C. W. "James Howden" (1986), Dictionary of Scottish Business Biography, vol. 1, Aberdeen
- Obituary of James Howden, The Engineer, 28 November 1913
