= Carlo Dinardo =

Italian-scottish engineer

Carlo Dinardo (1939–2022) was an Italian-born Scottish engineer.

== Early life and education ==
Dinardo was born in Ceppagna, a village in Molise region of Italy, and spent his early years during World War II. In 1950, his family moved to Scotland after his uncle encountered production challenges at an ice cream wafer factory in Airdrie.

In Scotland, Dinardo attended St Patrick's High School and Coatbridge Technical College while working part-time to support his studies.

== Career ==
Dinardo began his engineering career in Glasgow, initially in mechanical engineering before expanding to civil and structural disciplines. By 1965, after further studies at the University of Strathclyde (formerly the Andersonian Institute), he had become a chartered engineer.

In the late 1960s, Dinardo founded the Dinardo Partnership (DP), an engineering consultancy with offices in Scotland, London, and Bristol. The firm worked on projects both nationally and internationally, including assignments in China and Nigeria.

Dinardo was the president of the Institution of Engineers in Scotland from 1999 to 2001. His daughter Karen Rutherford Dinardo was also president of the IES from 2016 to 2018.

== Personal life ==
In 1962, Dinardo married Irene Niven. His family members were also involved in the business; his daughter Karen worked as an engineer and later served as president of the Institution of Engineers & Shipbuilders in Scotland, while his son Mark managed the firm's property investments. His daughter Lorraine pursued a career in medicine.
