= Scottish Engineering Hall of Fame =

- Type: Hall of fame
- Awarded for: Engineering
- Sponsored by: Institution of Engineers in Scotland (IES)
- Country: Scotland
- Motto: a Continuum of engineering excellence from Scotland
- First award: 2011
- Website: engineeringhalloffame.org

The Scottish Engineering Hall of Fame honours "those engineers from, or closely associated with, Scotland who have achieved, or deserve to achieve, greatness", as selected by an independent panel representing Scottish engineering institutions, academies, museums and archiving organisations.

The Scottish Engineering Hall of Fame was established by the Institution of Engineers in Scotland in 2011. New inductees are announced each year at the IES James Watt Dinner.

== Inductees ==
- Douglas Anderson
- William Arrol
- John Logie Baird
- George Balfour
- Alexander Graham Bell
- James Blyth
- David Boyle
- Thomas Graham Brown
- Sir George Bruce
- William Kinninmond Burton
- Craig Clark
- Victoria Drummond
- John Boyd Dunlop
- Henry Dyer
- David Elder
- John Elder
- Francis Elgar
- Sir William Fairbairn
- Mary (Molly) Fergusson
- Sandford Fleming
- George Forbes
- Alexander Gibb
- Hugh Gill
- James Goodfellow
- Sir Iain Gray
- Nigel Gresley
- Graeme Haldane
- Naeem Hussain
- Alexander Carnegie Kirk
- David Kirkaldy
- Carol Marsh
- James Clerk Maxwell
- Gordon McConnell
- Elijah McCoy
- Sir Jim McDonald
- Andrew Meikle
- Sir Duncan Michael
- Sir Donald Miller
- David Milne
- William Murdoch
- Robert Napier
- Anne Neville
- James Newlands

- Percy Pilcher
- Dorothée Pullinger
- William Rankine
- David Boswell Reid
- John Rennie
- Ian Ritchie
- John Scott Russell
- Stephen Salter
- Anne Gillespie Shaw
- Lesley Souter
- Robert Stevenson
- Robert Stirling
- William Symington
- Thomas Telford
- Robert William Thomson
- William Thomson, Lord Kelvin
- Robert Watson-Watt
- James Watt
- William Douglas Weir
- Sir Alfred Fernandez Yarrow
- James Young
