= Alexander Cleghorn =

Scottish engineer and shipbuilder

Alexander Cleghorn FRSE MICE IESS (1859–1922) was a Scottish engineer and shipbuilder. He served as President of the Institution of Engineers and Shipbuilders in Scotland 1917–1919.

== Life ==
He was born in Fife in 1859 and educated in St Andrews. He then studied both engineering at the University of Edinburgh and naval architecture at University of Glasgow.

He then began an apprenticeship with the Govan firm of Robert Napier and Sons. In 1897 he moved to Barclay Curle & Co as their engineering manager. He then entered the prestigious Fairfield Shipbuilding and Engineering Company in 1905 as Engineering Director.

He was elected a Fellow of the Royal Society of Edinburgh in 1913. His proposers were Sir Archibald Denny, George Alexander Gibson, James Geikie and Cargill Gilston Knott.

He retired in 1920, and died in Glasgow on 4 May 1922.
