= Ayre Acoustics =

Ayre Acoustics Inc.
- Company type: Private
- Industry: Audio equipment design and manufacturing
- Founded: 1993; 33 years ago
- Founders: Charles Hansen, Peter Bohacek, Katie Lehr
- Headquarters: Boulder, Colorado
- Area served: Worldwide
- Products: High-end audio processing equipment
- Number of employees: 18 (2014)
- Website: ayre.com

Ayre Acoustics Inc. is an American manufacturer of high-performance, high-fidelity audio components and systems co-founded in 1993 by Charles Hansen, Katie Lehr, and Peter Bohacek.

The audio output circuitry of the PonoPlayer was designed by engineers at Ayre Acoustics.
