= PonoPlayer =

Discontinued portable music player brand

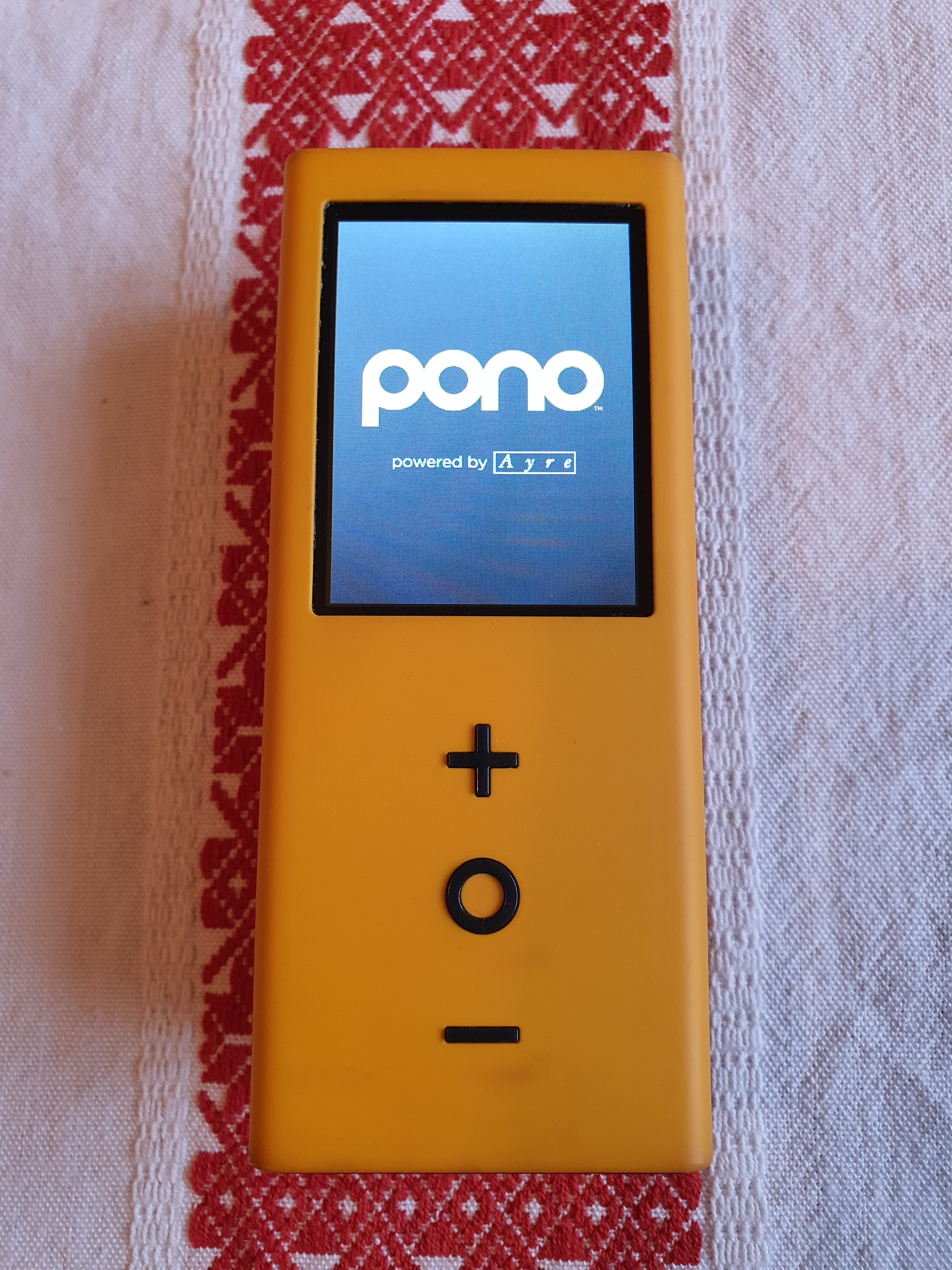
- Pono Player from first release of Kickstarter Back Up
- Developer: PonoMusic, Ayre Acoustics
- Type: Digital media, Portable media player
- Released: October 2014 (Kickstarter backers), February 2015 (everyone)
- Introductory price: US$399
- Operating system: Android 2.3 (API level 10)
- System on a chip: TI OMAP3630
- CPU: ARM Cortex-A8 (ARMv7)
- Memory: 256 MB
- Storage: 64 GB internal
- Removable storage: microSD slot (64GB SDXC card included) accepts SD, SDHC, and SDXC cards up to 128 GB
- Display: 2.5in color
- Graphics: PowerVR SGX530
- Sound: ESS Sabre32 ES9018K2M DAC, TI OPA4376 amplifier, Two 3.5 mm jacks
- Input: touchscreen, physical buttons
- Connectivity: USB 2.0
- Power: 2900 mAh Li-Ion battery (replaceable)
- Online services: PonoMusic online store
- Dimensions: 13×5×2.5 cm (5×2×1 in)
- Weight: 130 g (4.6 oz)
- Website: ponomusic.com at the Wayback Machine (archived 2014-03-12)

PonoPlayer was a portable music player created by Neil Young's company, PonoMusic, as the result of a successful Kickstarter campaign.

== Development and release ==
In September 2012, Neil Young appeared on the Late Show with David Letterman with a prototype PonoPlayer announcing his plans for the PonoMusic ecosystem. Early announcements named Meridian Audio as the development partner, but that changed in 2014 when Meridian was replaced by Ayre Acoustics. In April 2014, a successful crowdfunding campaign raised US$6.2M via preorders for the player using the Kickstarter platform. Kickstarter backers received devices starting in October 2014. The PonoMusic store opened pre-orders for PonoPlayer at the start of 2015, expecting them to ship within the month.

== Hardware and capabilities ==
While designed for use with the FLAC format lossless audio sold by the PonoMusic online store, the device could play other common formats including Apple Lossless (ALAC), uncompressed PCM (WAV, AIFF), DSD (DSD64) and DSD2 (DSD128), and the lossy formats AAC and MP3. PonoPlayer could play DRM-free audio in these formats from any source, including FLAC from HDtracks, AAC from iTunes, and lossless audio files copied or “ripped” from audio compact discs. PonoMusic provided the PonoMusic World cross–platform (Mac/Win) application software, based on JRiver Media Center, to manage audio files on the device and on a host computer, but was not required. Any operating system that supported USB mass-storage and the exFAT filesystem could add or remove music from PonoPlayer. A micro USB 2.0 port provided the only connectivity.

The device was based around the Texas Instruments OMAP3630 SoC, which included an ARM Cortex-A8, 256 MB of RAM, and ran a modified version of Android 2.3 (API level 10). PonoPlayer featured a 2.5-inch touchscreen display, with graphics accelerated by the integrated PowerVR SGX530 GPU. It had 64 GB of internal storage, and a microSD card slot that supported SDHC and SDXC cards up to 128 GB. A 64 GB SDXC card was included with the player. A replaceable 2900 mAh Li-Ion battery powered the device for up to eight hours of playback on a full charge.

The audio output circuitry was designed by engineers at Ayre Acoustics, and featured an ESS Sabre32 ES9018K2M digital-to-analog converter (DAC). The DAC accepted stereo PCM input up to 384 kHz with samples of up to 32 bits per channel. The device had two 3.5 mm audio outputs: an amplified headphone output, and a line-level output for connecting to other amplified equipment, such as a home or car stereo system.

The PonoPlayer measured 13×5×2.5 cm in a shallow triangle shape designed to fit in a pocket but also keep the display visible whilst sitting on a desktop or stereo. The device weighed 130g.

== Reception ==
Leo Laporte gave the PonoPlayer a "buy" recommendation. He praised the sound quality, but noted that "synchronization is fairly slow, this is a USB 2.0 device and these are really big files." At that time he wasn't aware its performance would be measured later by the specialized site ASR as below the CD.

Stereophile awarded the PonoPlayer "Digital component of the year" in 2015.

The PonoPlayer was otherwise largely panned as "snake oil" by audio and technology enthusiasts like Linus Sebastian who were critical of the player's design, components, and performance (especially battery life) for its price compared to similarly priced smartphone devices already capable of high resolution FLAC playback.

== Demise ==
In April 2017 Young announced the end of the PonoPlayer, blaming record companies for charging too much for high resolution formats. The PonoMusic store that sold downloadable music had already been in an "under construction" mode since July 2016 following acquisition by Apple of the store provider Omnifone.

== See also ==
- FiiO X Series
- Tidal (service)
