= Astell & Kern =

South Korean consumer electronics company

- Type: Subsidiary
- Industry: Consumer electronics
- Founded: October 2013; 13 years ago
- Number of locations: 28 (2016)
- Area served: Worldwide
- Owner: Iriver
- Website: www.astellnkern.com

Astell & Kern is a South Korean consumer electronics company founded in October 2013, and is wholly owned by Dreamus. The company manufactures media players, CD players, headphones, and home cinema products. It was launched as a premium successor to iriver products.

== History ==
=== Roots and founding ===
In January 2013, iriver debuted the AK100 media player at CES 2013, to polarizing reception from critics at release. In July, a pair of in-ear monitors dubbed the AKR01 were released to complement the media players. In August, the AK100's successor, the AK120, was released with minor design enhancements but notoriously the addition of two Wolfson WM8740 DAC chipsets, and was released to better reception. In October, Astell & Kern was founded by iRiver to develop the in-brand products. A limited edition called the AK120 Titan was released shortly in December.

=== Growth, icons and debuts ===
On 9 January 2014, the company debuted the AK240 for CES 2014, with it debuting Wi-FI connectivity, and an operating system based upon Android instead of Linux directly. Following the acquisition of Wolfson by Cirrus Logic, the company replaced the Wolfson DAC duo with Logic 4398 chipsets. At CES, the AKR02, the successor to the AKR01, debuted in February; Astell & Kern also revealed Home cinema products, such as a valve amplifier and cylindrical speaker, as well. In May, collaborating with Jerry Harvey Audio, the company released the AKR03 monitors, successing the AKR02, as well as the AK120II and AK100II players, the second-generation of the AK120 and AK100 players respectively. In honor of the 75th anniversary of Blue Note Records, the AK240 announced a "Blue Note Special Limited Edition" on 17 October.

In January 2015, the "AK T5p" headphones, which were co-produced with Beyerdynamic, were released. In February, the company debuted the stainless steel model of the AK240, the AK240SS, and the AK500N, a Network Audio System which can store 1TB of files in a solid-state drive, can stream lossless from PCs and NAS devices, and is noiseless when plugged in. In April, the AK Jr. was released. Unlike other models, Jr. is an entry-level and much smaller media player than other models.

=== Expansion and product debuts ===
In August, the all-in-one system AK T1 was released, along with the Super Junior x AK Jr collaboration and the Beyerdynamic-produced AK T8iE monitors. In November, Hyundai Card collaborated with Astell & Kern to create the AK100II x HCC model, as well as the AK320's debut and Beyerdynamic-produced AK T1p. In 2015, Astell & Kern collaborated with Japanese voice actress Kana Hanazawa to create the limited AK100II Kana Hanazawa edition, which would include a special song titled "Tadoritsuku Basho" (A Place to Reach) pre-installed in the player.

On 21 January 2016, the company released a Copper Edition of the AK380. In February, the company released four sets of monitors co-produced with Jerry Harvey Audio: Layla II, Roxanne II, Angie II, and Rosie. In July, the company developed a new media player: the AK70.

== Products ==
=== Mastering Quality Sound (MQS) ===
Astell & Kern markets 24-bit audio with a 44.1 kHz to 192 kHz sampling rate under the name Mastering Quality Sound (MQS). Music sold with this tag comes in both the lossless formats: WAV, AIFF, FLAC, ALAC, APE as well as lossy formats: MP3, AAC, WMA and OGG.

=== Hardware ===
Year	Model	Type	Spec		
Year	Model	Type	Capacity	Input	Battery
2013	AK100	Media player	microSD	micro USB	16 hours
2013	AKR01	In-ear monitors	—N/a	Phone jack	—N/a
2013	AK120	Media player	64GB 64GB microSD	microUSB 2x microSD	16 hours
2013	AK120 Titan	Media player	128GB 64GB microSD	microUSB 2x microSD	14 hours
2013	AK10	USB DAC/AMP	—N/a	micro USB	11 hours
2014	AK240	Media player	256GB 128GB microSD	microUSB microSD	10 hours
2014	AKR02	In-ear monitors	—N/a	Phone jack	—N/a
2014	AKR03	In-ear monitors	—N/a	Phone jack	—N/a
2014	AK100II	Media player	64GB 128GB microSD	microUSB microSD	—N/a
2014	AK120II	Media player	128GB Internal and microSD	microUSB microSD	—N/a
2014	AK240 Blue Note Special Limited Edition	Media player	256GB 128GB microSD	microUSB microSD	—N/a
2015	AK T5p	Headphones	—N/a	Phone jack	—N/a
2015	AK240SS	Media player	256GB 128GB microSD	microUSB microSD	—N/a
2015	AK500N	Network Audio System	1TB	AES/EBU BNC Coaxial Optical	7 hours
2015	AK Jr	Media player	64GB Internal and microSD	microUSB microSD	6–8 hours
2015	AK380	Media player	256GB 128GB microSD	microUSB microSD	10 hours
2015	AK T1	Sound system	—N/a	Auxiliary Optical microUSB microSD	—N/a
2015	Super Junior x AK Jr.	Media player	64GB Internal and microSD	microUSB microSD	6–8 hours
2015	AK T8iE	In-ear monitors	—N/a	Phone jack	—N/a
2015	Layla	In-ear monitors	—N/a	Phone jack	—N/a
2015	Angie	In-ear monitors	—N/a	Phone jack	—N/a
2015	AK100II x HCC	Media player	64GB 128GB microSD	microUSB microSD	—N/a
2015	AK320	Media player	128GB Internal and microSD	microUSB microSD	—N/a
2015	AK T1p	Headphones	—N/a	Phone jack	—N/a
2016	AK70	Media player			
2016	AK300	Media player			
2016	AK380 Copper	Media player	256GB 128GB microSD	microUSB microSD	10 hours
2016	AK T8iE MkII	In-ear monitors			
2016	Angie II	In-ear monitors	—N/a	Phone jack	—N/a
2016	Layla II	In-ear monitors	—N/a	Phone jack	—N/a
2016	Michelle	In-ear monitors	—N/a	Phone jack	—N/a
2016	Rosie	In-ear monitors	—N/a	Phone jack	—N/a
2016	Roxanne II	In-ear monitors			
2017	KANN	Media player	64GB Internal and SD+microSD	USB-C SD + microSD	15 hours
2017	AK70 MKII	Media player	64GB _{Internal} 256GB _{microSD}	micro-USB microSD	—N/a
2017	A&ultima SP1000 (SS/CU/BK)	Media player	256GB _{Internal} 256GB _{MicroSD}	USB-C microSD	12 hours
2017	Michelle Limited	In-ear monitors			
2017	AK CD-Ripper MKII	CD ripper			
2018	A&norma SR15	Media player	64GB Internal 400GB microSD	USB-C microSD	—N/a
2018	A&futura SE100	Media player		USB-C microSD	
2018	A&ultima SP1000M	Media player	128GB _{Internal} 400GB _{microSD}	USB-C microSD	10 hours
2018	Billie Jean	In-ear monitors			
2018	Diana	In-ear monitors			
2018	AK T5p 2nd Generation	Headphones			
2019	A&ultima SP1000M Gold	Media player			
2019	A&ultima SP2000	Media player			
2019	KANN Cube	Media player			
2019	SA700	Media player			
2019	SP1000 AMP	Amplifier			
2019	AK T9iE	In-ear monitors			
2019	Layla Aion	In-ear monitors			
2020	A&futura SE200	Media player	256GB Internal 1TB microSD	USB-C microSD	10 hours (AK4499EQ) 14 hours (ES9068AS)
2020	A&norma SR25	Media player	64GB Internal 1TB microSD	USB-C microSD	21 hours
2020	KANN Alpha	Media player	64GB Internal 1TB microSD	USB-C microSD	14.5 hours
2021	A&ultima SP2000T	Media player	256GB Internal 1TB microSD	USB-C microSD	About 9 hours (Standard : FLAC, 16bit/44.1 kHz, Unbalance, Volume 50, LCD Off, LED On, OP AMP Mode)
2021	A&futura SE180	Media player	256GB Internal 1TB microSD	USB-C microSD	About 10.5 hours (SEM 1: ES9038PRO x 1) About 10.5 hours (SEM 2: AK4497EQ x 2) About 13 hours (SEM 3: ES9038Q2M x 4) About 14 hours (SEM 4: AK4493SEQ x 2) (FLAC, 16bit, 44.1 kHz, Vol.50, LCD Off)
2021	A&norma SR25 MKII	Media player	64GB Internal 1TB microSD	USB-C microSD	Up to 20 hours (based on MUSIC: FLAC, 16bit, 44.1 kHz, Unbalance, Volume 50, EQ Off, LCD Off)
2021	AK Solaris X	In-ear monitors			
2021	AK ZERO 1	In-ear monitors			
2022	A&ultima SP3000	Media player	256GB Internal 1TB microSD	USB-C microSD	About 10 hours (Standard: FLAC, 16-bit/44.1 kHz, Vol. 80, LCD off)
