= Inverkip power station =

Former oil-fired power station in Scotland

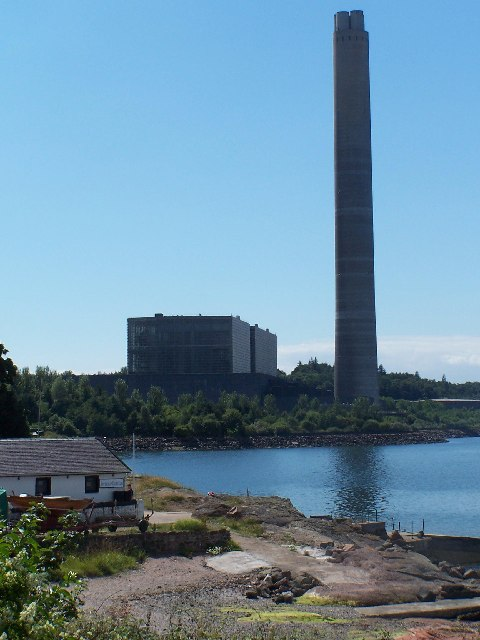
- Inverkip power station
- Country: Scotland
- Location: Inverclyde
- Coordinates: 55.899295°N 4.886956°W
- Status: Demolished
- Construction began: 1970
- Commission date: 1976
- Decommission date: 2006
- Owner: ScottishPower

Thermal power station
- Primary fuel: Oil

Power generation
- Make and model: Parsons
- Units decommissioned: 3 x 676MW
- Nameplate capacity: 2028MW

External links
- Commons: Related media on Commons

Inverkip power station was an oil-fired power station on the Inverclyde coast, Firth of Clyde, west coast of Scotland. It was closer to Wemyss Bay than Inverkip, and dominated the local area with its 236 m (774 ft) chimney, the third tallest chimney in the United Kingdom and Scotland's tallest free-standing structure. In common with other power stations in Scotland it lacked cooling towers; instead, sea water was used as a coolant. The station consisted of three generating units with a combined total rating of 2028 megawatts (MW).

== History ==
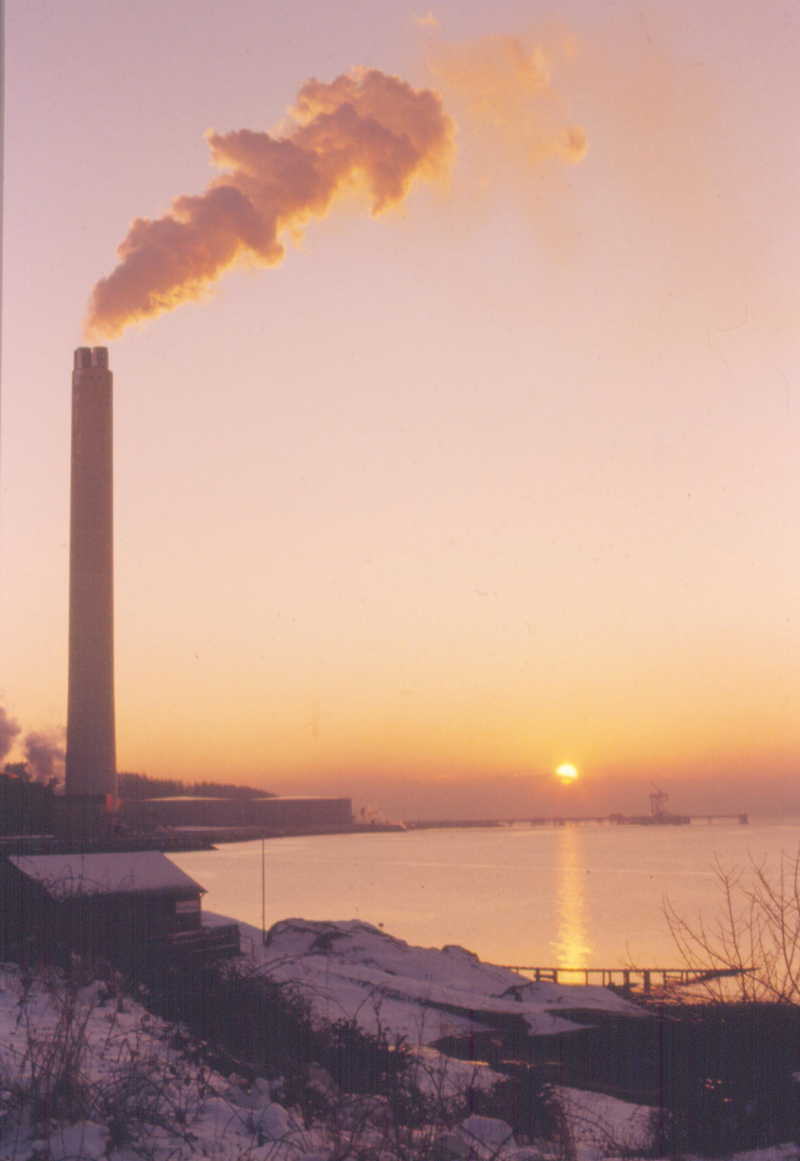
The power station in use in January/February 1985. View from the war memorial at Inverkip Point.

Construction began in 1970 for the then South of Scotland Electricity Board (SSEB). It was to be Scotland's first oil-fired power station. The soaring price of oil as a result of the 1973 oil crisis meant that by the time construction was completed in 1976, generation was uneconomical. It was never utilised commercially, with 1200 MW kept in reserve and the remaining capacity being used to satisfy peak demand. It was only used at peak capacity during the miners' strike of 1984–1985, when low coal supplies prompted operation. Generation ceased in January 1988 and although the plant was retained as a strategic reserve, it was never used as such. The plant was finally mothballed in the late 1990s, but was kept fully operational until 2006 when it was decommissioned.

The power station's equipment was kept intact and continually operating dehumidifiers were used to keep it in good condition while the facility was unused.

In construction, provision was made on site for a fourth generating unit (to the north of the existing units), including a fourth stack inside the chimney, but the fourth generating unit was cancelled before construction commenced. One design feature of the power station is the lack of steam driven boiler feed pumps, with units 1 and 2 being provided with three 50% electric boiler feed pumps and unit 3 with two 50% electric feed pumps. The main turbo-generator was manufactured by Parsons, and many of the major components were interchangeable with the turbo-generators at Hunterston B around 13 miles (21 km) south, on the Firth of Clyde, also then owned by the South of Scotland Electricity Board.

Most workers lived in Wemyss Bay, many in housing provided by the Scottish Special Housing association, as well as the more affluent Lawrence estate.

The turbines were also interchangeable with Torness and Heysham 2 power station; the stator from one of the turbines was transferred to Heysham 2 Nuclear power station in the 1990s under the CEGB which was then privatised to National Power, Powergen, Nuclear Electric and British Energy.

== Demolition ==
The site has been cleared for housing and small business development. Preparatory demolition work started in April 2010. Since 2006, large amounts of equipment were removed to be used as spares at other power stations, including switchgear, turbine rotors, and control equipment. The last visits to remove equipment took place in March 2012.

Electrical oil and other chemicals were drained to make the site safe, and major demolition began in June 2010 with the removal of one of the three large oil tanks. The northern section (Unit 3) of the main building was demolished by a controlled explosion at the end of October 2012, and by November all three large oil tanks had been removed from the site. The main boiler room was demolished in February 2013.

The final significant structure, its landmark chimney, was demolished by controlled explosions at 10 pm on Sunday 28 July 2013.

Former Inverkip workers were relocated to Hartlepool or Heysham nuclear power stations.

Between 2019 and 2021, the substation and power lines were removed.

== Gallery ==
Inverkip (left) with Power Station in 2005.

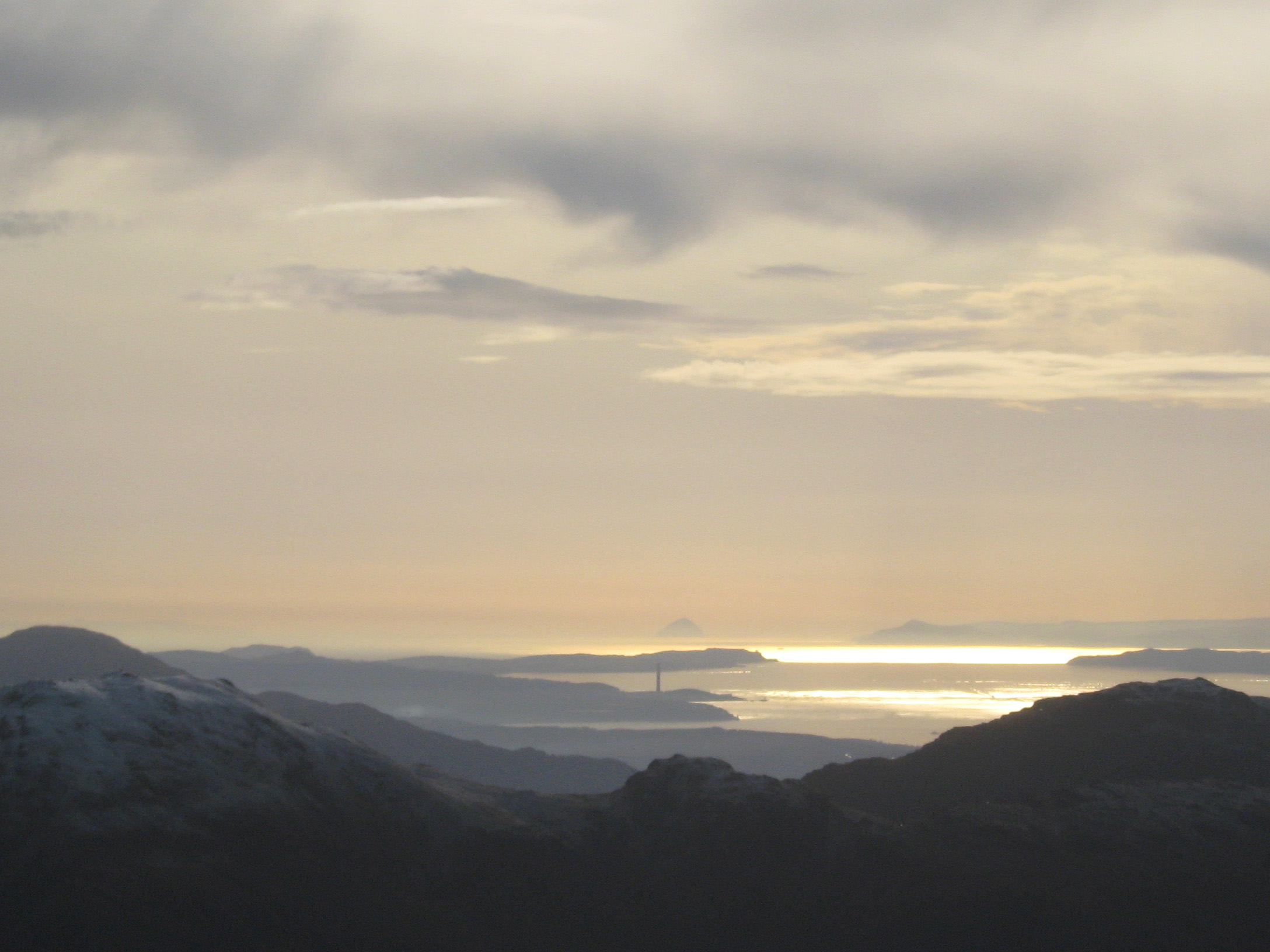
Inverkip power station chimney, seen in 2009 from Ben Vorlich (Loch Lomond).

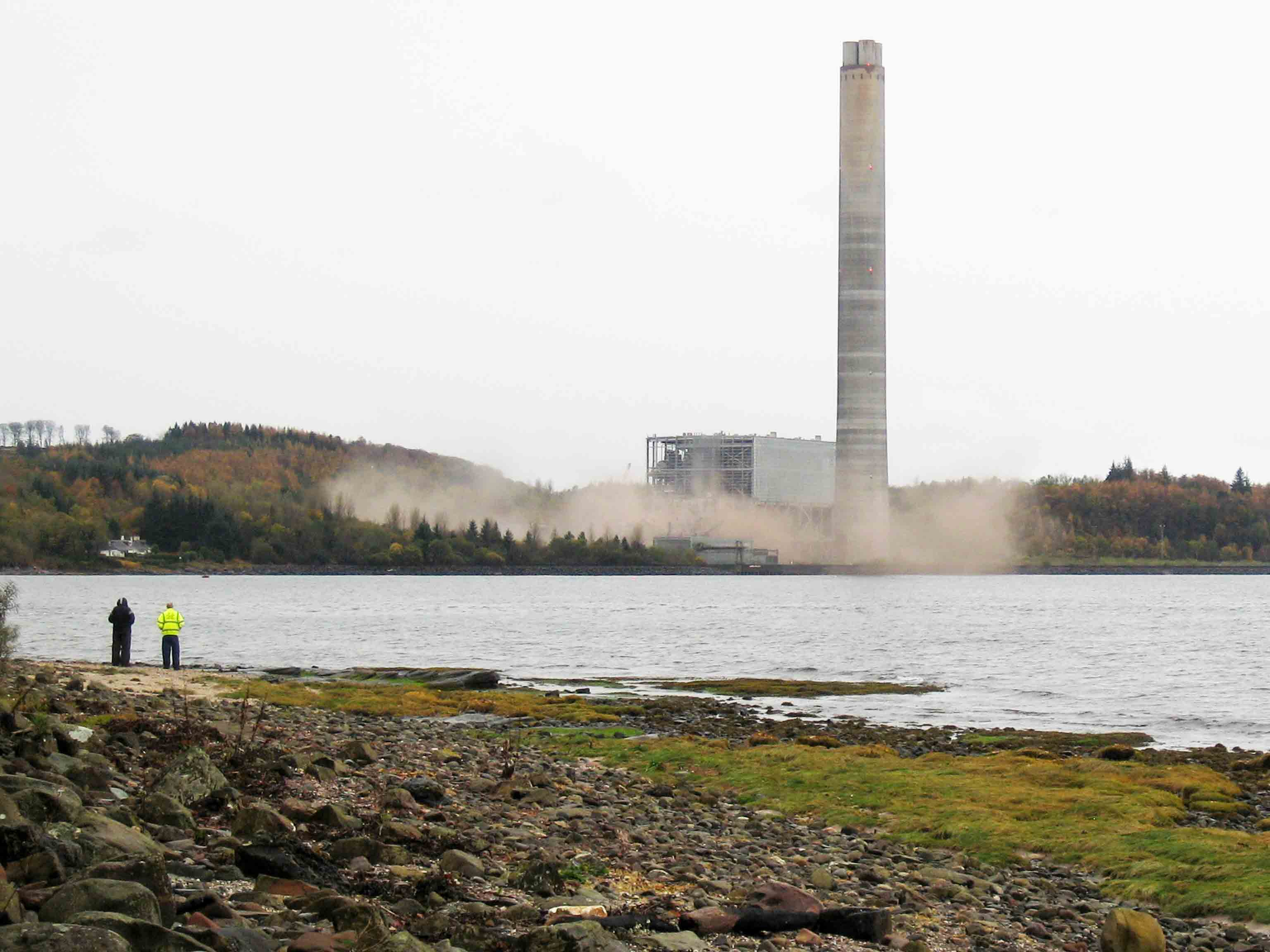
Demolition explosion on 31 October 2012.

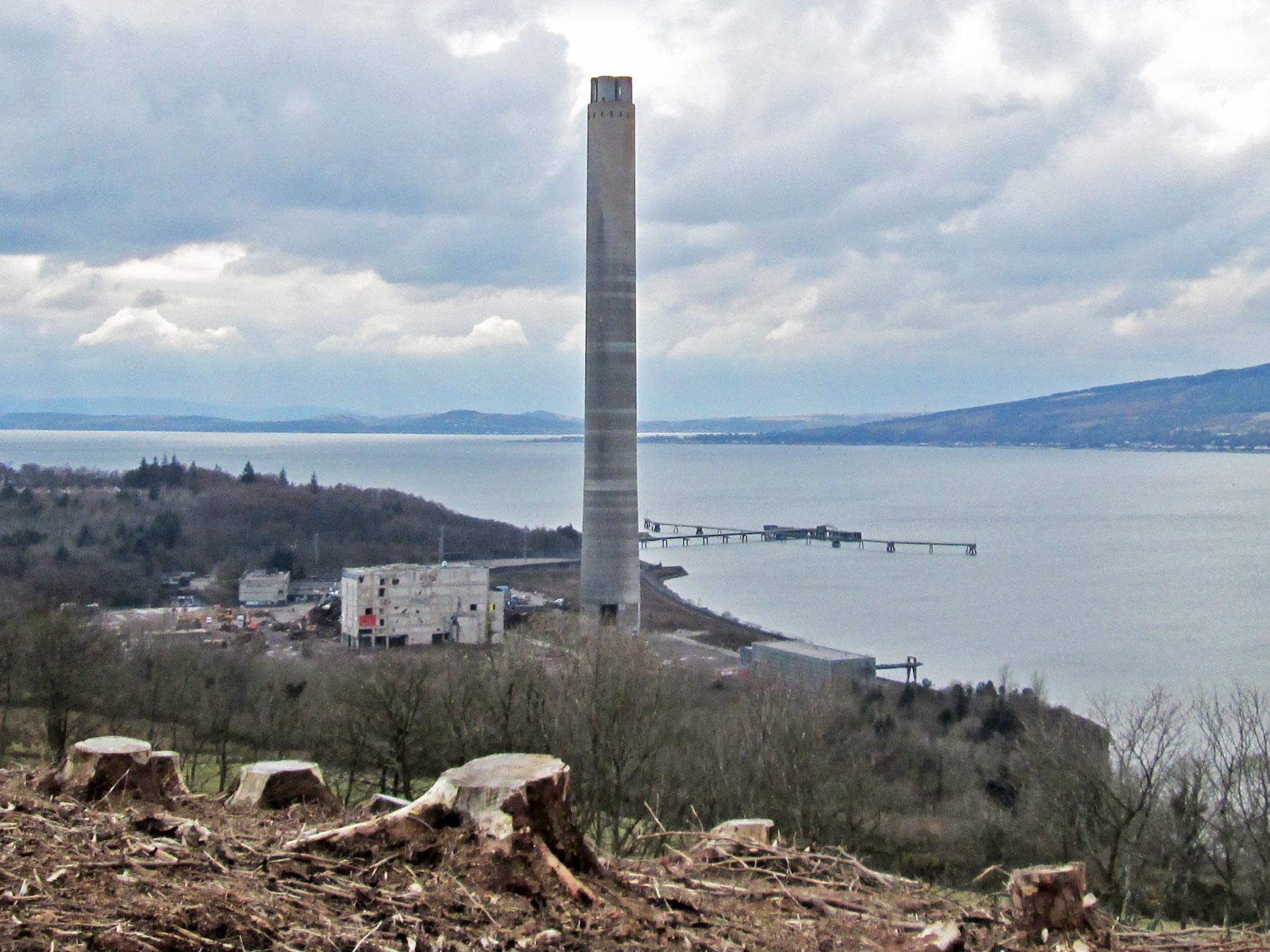
Progress as of 20 March 2013.

The tallest free suspended structure in Scotland
