= George Hibberd =

English cricketer

George Hibberd (8 February 1845 — 24 August 1911) was an English cricketer. He was a right-arm fast bowler who played for Lancashire. He was born in Sheffield and died in Todwick, near Rotherham.

Hibberd made his sole first-class appearance for Lancashire against Yorkshire in 1867. Batting eleventh, he scored no runs in the two innings in which he batted, though he took one wicket with the ball.

Later in his professional career, Hibberd became a stonemason.
