= Ian Ritchie (businessman) =

Scottish businessman

Ian Cleland Ritchie is a Scottish businessman specialising in the information technology sector.

In 1984, Ritchie founded the software company, Office Workstations Limited (OWL) in Edinburgh, after leaving ICL when they closed their Scottish Development Centre at Dalkeith Palace the previous year.

In late 1990, Ritchie met Tim Berners-Lee at a computer fair in Paris. It was there that Berners-Lee told him about a system he and his team at CERN were developing, which with the aid of computer terminals, would enable its staff to view and edit the vast amounts of information the facility was generating and storing in hypertext documents. He said the system could be scaled up for use worldwide, and would enable users of computers connected to the Internet to access, edit and share documents in the same way too – he called this new system the World Wide Web. Thinking this sounded a bit pretentious, not to mention a mouthful to pronounce, Ritchie convinced himself it would not come to much and duly rejected the idea as a viable business proposition. From that day on, HTML and HTTP remained free and non-proprietary. Over the next few years, the number of web sites online grew from 1 in 1991, to over 1 billion by 2014. From its humble beginnings, the web grew into the enormous global communications and commercial system it is today.

From 1997 onwards, Ritchie became involved in venture capital and was the founding chairman of several Scottish IT companies, including Voxar, VIS Entertainment, Orbital Software Group, and Digital Bridges. He has also been on the board of Scottish Enterprise, the Scottish Further and Higher Education Funding Council, and Channel Four Television Corporation.

He was a founding director and chairman of the Scottish Software Federation from 1988 to 1990, and served as president of the British Computer Society from 1998 to 1999.

In the New Year Honours 2003, Ritchie was appointed a Commander of the Order of the British Empire (CBE) for services to enterprise and education. Ritchie also holds honorary doctorates from four Scottish universities.

As of 2019, he is the non-executive chairman of Tern plc, Computer Applications Service, and Krotos; he is a board director of Shotscope Ltd, and was chairman of iomart Group plc from 2008 to 2018. He serves on the board of the National Theatre of Scotland, and the Scottish Council for Development and Industry (SCDI).

Between 2012 and 2016 he was vice-president for business of The Royal Society of Edinburgh, having become a Fellow in 2002, and also honorary treasurer of the Royal Academy of Engineering, having become a Fellow in 2001.

His writes a column in Scottish Business Insider magazine, and his TED talk has been viewed over 600,000 times. Ritchie was inducted into the Scottish Engineering Hall of Fame in 2022.
