= Alex Daly =

American writer

- Born: Alexandra Daly; 1987 (age 38–39); Miami, Florida, U.S.
- Education: Ransom Everglades School; Vanderbilt University
- Occupations: Crowdfunding consultant; author
- Website: daly.nyc

Alex Daly (born 1987) is an American crowdfunding consultant and author.

== Early life ==
Daly was born in Miami, Florida, where she attended Ransom Everglades High School. She graduated from Vanderbilt University, where she majored in Spanish, Philosophy Honors, and minored in Film Studies. After school, Daly interned at New York Magazine and Spin before working as a fact-checker at WSJ Magazine, and then as a production manager for documentary films.

== Career ==
Daly was the founder of Vann Alexandra, a New York City based consultancy focused on the preparation, promotion, and launch of crowdfunding campaigns on platforms such as Kickstarter and Indiegogo. The company also offered marketing and public relations services, which they refer to as "crowd relations."

Daly specialises in the crowdfunding field, leading her to entitle her book "The Crowdsourceress". As of 2016, Daly raised over $20 million from 100,000 people worldwide. Notable clients include Neil Young, Eric Ries, TLC, filmmaker Gary Hustwit, director Griffin Dunne and producer Annabelle Dunne for the Joan Didion documentary The Center Will Not Hold, film production company Mr. Mudd for the Einstein on the Beach documentary, British journalist Eliot Higgins of Bellingcat, and Pentagram partner Marina Willer.

In 2016, she was named a Forbes 30 Under 30 in the Marketing & Advertising category.

In 2019, Vann Alexandra and Daly's PR company DalyPR merged and rebranded into Daly, a marketing and PR company offering publicity, crowdfunding and events services.
