= Alexander Selligue =

French engineer

Alexander François Selligue (1784-1845) was a French engineer. His name was in fact Alexandre François Gilles, but he used Selligue as an anagram of Gilles.

In 1832, he together with David Blum patented an application of shale oil for direct illumination. In 1838, he patented "the employment of mineral oils for lighting". His process of distilling bituminous shales (oil shale) was first described in the Journal des Connaissances Usuelles in 1834. This process for the oil shale retorting was first used in Autun, France, in 1838. This is considered the start of the modern oil shale industry.
