= John Elder Professor of Naval Architecture and Ocean Engineering =

The John Elder Professor of Naval Architecture and Ocean Engineering at the University of Glasgow, Scotland, was established in 1883 and endowed by Isabella Elder (1828–1905) in honor of her husband, John Elder. John Elder was a renowned marine engineer and shipbuilder of Randolph, Elder & Co. (1824–1869).

== John Elder Professors of Naval Architecture and Ocean Engineering ==
- Francis Elgar LLD (1883)
- Philip Jenkins (1886)
- Sir John Harvard Biles DSc LLD (1891)
- Percy Archibald Hillhouse DSc (1921–1942)
- Andrew McCance Robb DSc LLD (1944)
- John Farquhar Christie Conn DSc (1957)
- Douglas Faulkner BSc PhD RCNC FEng (1973)
- Nigel D P Barltrop BSc CEng SICE MRINA

== See also ==
- List of Professorships at the University of Glasgow
