= Fiio =

Chinese company specializing in audio equipment

FiiO Electronics Technology Company, Ltd.
- Native name: 廣州飛傲電子科技有限公司
- Romanized name: Guǎngzhōu fēi ào diànzǐ kējì yǒuxiàn gōngsī
- Type: Limited liability company
- Industry: Audio equipment
- Founded: 2007
- Headquarters: Guangzhou, China
- Brands: FiiO; Jade Audio; Snowsky
- Number of employees: >300 (2023)
- Website: https://fiio.com/

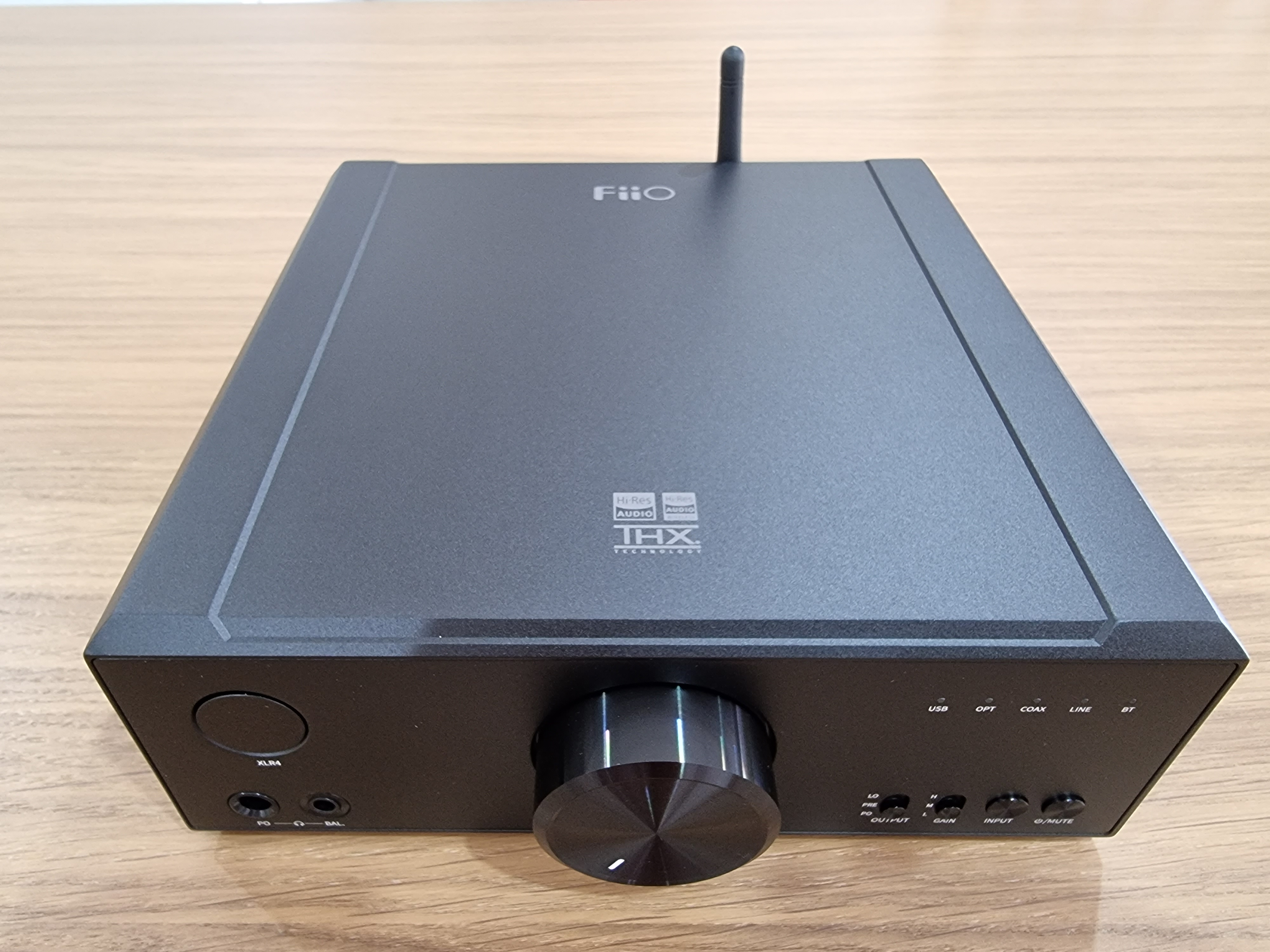
FiiO K9 headphone DAC + amplifier

FiiO (FiiO Electronics Technology Company, Ltd.) is a Chinese consumer-electronics manufacturer headquartered in Guangzhou, founded in 2007. The company designs and markets portable and desktop audio equipment, including digital audio players (DAPs), headphone amplifiers and DACs, Bluetooth DAC/amps, and in-ear monitors (IEMs).

FiiO first gained notice for low-cost portable amplifiers and USB DAC/amps in its "E-series", notably the E17 "Alpen" (2011–12). From 2013 it expanded into DAPs with the X-series (X3, X5, and the modular Android-based X7), helping to popularise affordable hi-resolution players; later Android M-series players such as the M11 broadened codec support and introduced dual balanced outputs.

Alongside players, FiiO diversified into earphones (e.g. the F9 and subsequent FH/FA lines) and portable Bluetooth DAC/amps; the BTR5 (2019) and BTR7 received widespread coverage as compact devices for driving wired headphones over wireless links. The company also operates the sub-brands Jade Audio and Snowsky.

== History ==
FiiO Electronics Technology Company, Ltd. was founded in Guangzhou, China, in 2007 to develop affordable portable hi-fi products under the FiiO brand. The company's first widely recognised products were compact portable headphone amplifiers and USB DAC/amps in the "E-series". Among these, the E17 "Alpen" (2011–12) received broad coverage in head-fi publications as a do-it-all portable DAC/amp and dockable partner for FiiO's desktop units.

FiiO entered the digital audio player (DAP) market in 2013 with the X3, followed by higher-tier models such as the X5 (2014) and the Android-based, modular-amp X7 (2015). The X-series helped re-popularise dedicated hi-res players in the sub-US$500 segment and established FiiO’s international profile.

As streaming became central to portable listening, FiiO pivoted to Android-based DAPs with the M-series. The M11, announced at the company's Spring 2019 launch, introduced a more powerful SoC and dual balanced outputs, and later spawned Pro/Plus variants.

In parallel, FiiO diversified beyond players and amps into earphones (e.g., the F9 and subsequent FH/FA lines) and into Bluetooth DAC/amps. The BTR5 (2019) became a prominent portable Bluetooth DAC/amp, followed by later models such as the BTR7.

== Subsidiaries and sub-brands ==
FiiO owns a subsidiary Jade Audio, which also manufactures audio equipment. The company has also marketed products under a sub-brand, Snowsky, since 2024.
