= David Milne (technologist) =

Scottish technologist

David Milne OBE FREng FRSE FIET
- Born: Alastair David Milne; 1942 (age 83–84); Edinburgh, Scotland
- Education: Bristol University; Heriot-Watt University
- Scientific career
- Fields: Microelectronics
- Workplaces: Wolfson Microelectronics; University of Edinburgh

Alastair David Milne is a Scottish technologist and founder and former CEO of the Wolfson Microelectronics company.

== Early life and education ==
Milne was born in Edinburgh and attended George Watson's College. He pursued higher education in physics, earning a Bachelors from Heriot-Watt University in 1966 and an MSc and then PhD from the University of Bristol in 1968.

== Career ==
In 1970, Milne joined the newly created Wolfson Industrial Liaison Unit at the University of Edinburgh. In 1973 he was promoted to director, renamed the unit as the Wolfson Microelectronics Institute and changed its focus to the design of semiconductor devices. In 1984, he co-founded the spinout company Wolfson Microelectronics which developed audio processing products for consumer electronics made by major manufacturers including Apple Inc and Samsung. The company became the first successful spin-out from a Scottish university and the second to be listed on the London Stock Exchange. Milne was chief executive officer of Wolfson Microelectronics until 2007 and as non-executive director until 2012.

Milne has been active in the promotion of science and technology. He was chairman of the Edinburgh International Science Festival between 2007 and 2022, and as trustee and chair of the James Clerk Maxwell Foundation.

== Awards and recognition ==
In recognition of his contributions to technology and business he was awarded an OBE in 1984, Fellowship of the Royal Society of Edinburgh in 1991, Fellowship of the Institution of Engineering and Technology in 1992, and Fellowship of the Royal Academy of Engineering in 2002.

He was awarded the Royal Society of Edinburgh's Royal Medal in 2012 and honorary degrees from the University of Bristol and Heriot-Watt University in 2007, and the University of Edinburgh in 2008.

He has received several business awards including Scotland's Entrepreneur of the Year in 2003. He was inducted into the Scottish Engineering Hall of Fame in 2024.
