= Wolfson Microelectronics =

Microelectronics and fabless semiconductor company

Wolfson Microelectronics plc
- Type: Public limited company
- Traded as: LSE:WLF
- Industry: Semiconductor, Digital signal processing, Mixed-signal integrated circuits
- Founded: Edinburgh (1984)
- Defunct: 28 April 2014
- Fate: Acquired by Cirrus Logic
- Headquarters: Edinburgh, Scotland, United Kingdom
- Key people: Mike Hickey (CEO); Andy Brannan (CCO); David Milne (Co-founder); Jim Reid (Co-founder)
- Number of employees: 420
- Parent: Cirrus Logic
- Subsidiaries: Sonaptic Ltd
- Website: cirrus.com wolfsonmicro.com at the Wayback Machine (archived July 3, 2014) (prior to acquisition).

Wolfson Microelectronics plc was a microelectronics and fabless semiconductor company headquartered in Edinburgh, Scotland. It specialised in signal processing and mixed-signal chips for the consumer electronics market and had engineering and sales offices throughout Asia-Pacific, Europe, and the United States. In 2014, it was acquired by Cirrus Logic for £291 million.

Wolfson chips have found applications within the digital audio player market, such as in Apple's iPod product line, Microsoft's Zune, Cowon's line of mp3 and PMP players, and Sony's PSP. Wolfson chips have also found place in the Microsoft Xbox game console, Logitech Squeezebox Duet and the PalmOne Treo smartphone, and early versions of the iPhone and iPod Touch.

== History ==
Wolfson Microelectronics plc was started in 1984 by David Milne and Jim Reid. Within a year, the company had 20 employees and a deal with Fujitsu. Wolfson grew and floated on the London Stock Exchange in 2003 and was listed in the FTSE 250. Both Milne and Reid had connections with the University of Edinburgh; Reid attained a First Class Honours degree in EEE, and Milne directed the Wolfson Microelectronics Institute at King's Buildings from 1973 to 1985. In February, 2007, when Milne chose to step down, he was replaced in his CEO role by Dave Shrigley, previously Vice-President at Intel Corporation. His departure was one of a number of executive changes in late 2006, as Financial Director George Elliott also stood down.

In 2006, Milne was declared Entrepreneur of the Year by the CBI, and Wolfson named Company of the Year. In November 2006 David Shrigley became the CEO of Wolfson, his first appointment at this level: he had previously worked for Intel in the Asia-Pacific region, and held directorships elsewhere.

In 2007, Wolfson acquired Sonaptic Ltd, consisting of former Sensaura employees, intending to expand the companys audio market and reach. Sonaptic specialized in 3D positional audio for mobile devices, which lead to the acquisition.

In September 2008, Mike Hickey joined Wolfson as Chief Executive Officer Designate and became Chief Executive Officer on 1 January 2009. Mr Hickey joined Wolfson from Motorola Inc, where he had held various senior positions in Motorola's mobile device business. In July 2009, Andy Brannan joined Wolfson as Chief Commercial Officer. Mr Brannan previously held the position of VP of Nokia's SOSCO business, and prior to that spent eight years as Executive VP of Sales & Customer Operations at Symbian Ltd.

Cirrus Logic acquired the Wolfson for 235p per share in April 2014, valuing the company at £291 million.

== Products ==
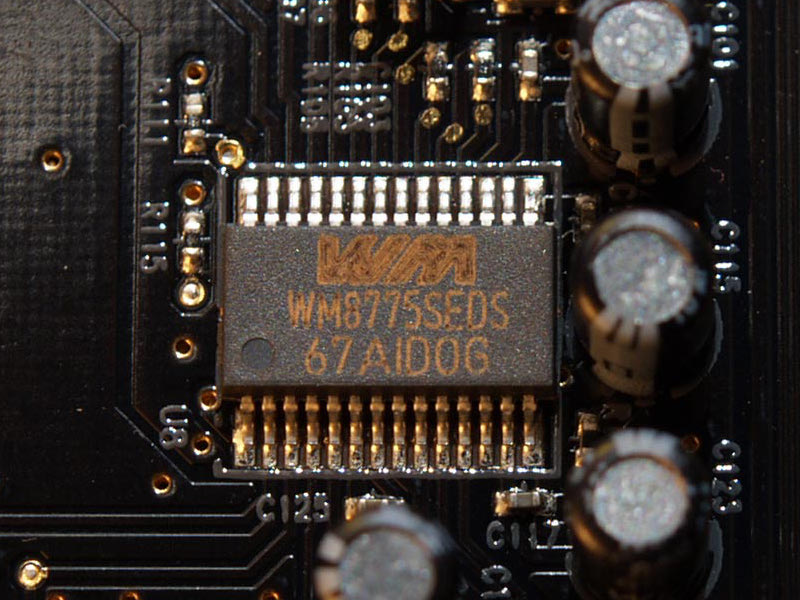
analog-to-digital converter WM8775 made by Wolfson placed on an X-Fi Fatal1ty Pro sound card.

Wolfson products have found applications within the digital audio player market, such as in Microsoft's Zune product line, including the Zune 30, Zune 80, and Zune HD, Cowon's line of mp3 and PMP players, as well as providing the codec functionality for much of Apple Inc.'s iPod series (with the exception of the iPod shuffle and iPod classic) and Sony's PSP. Wolfson chips have also found place in the Microsoft Xbox game console, Logitech Squeezebox Duet and the PalmOne Treo smartphone, with the Apple connection continuing with the earlier versions of the iPhone and iPod Touch.

Wolfson audio products can also be found in most Tegra 2 SoC devices and some devices like the Samsung Wave S8500 and Samsung i9000 Galaxy S smartphones as well as a number of LG phones including the LG-LB4400 music phone and the Android-powered LG Optimus GT540 smartphone.

In April 2010, Wolfson signed a licence agreement with Tensilica to create a low power, high-definition (HD) sound platform.

Wolfson's chipsets were known for delivering high-quality sound that matched or surpassed the offerings of well-established manufacturers like Cirrus Logic. After replacing Wolfson's chip with a chip from Cirrus Logic there was a minor decline in Apple's iPod sound quality when connected with high-end audio gear despite the improved board design.

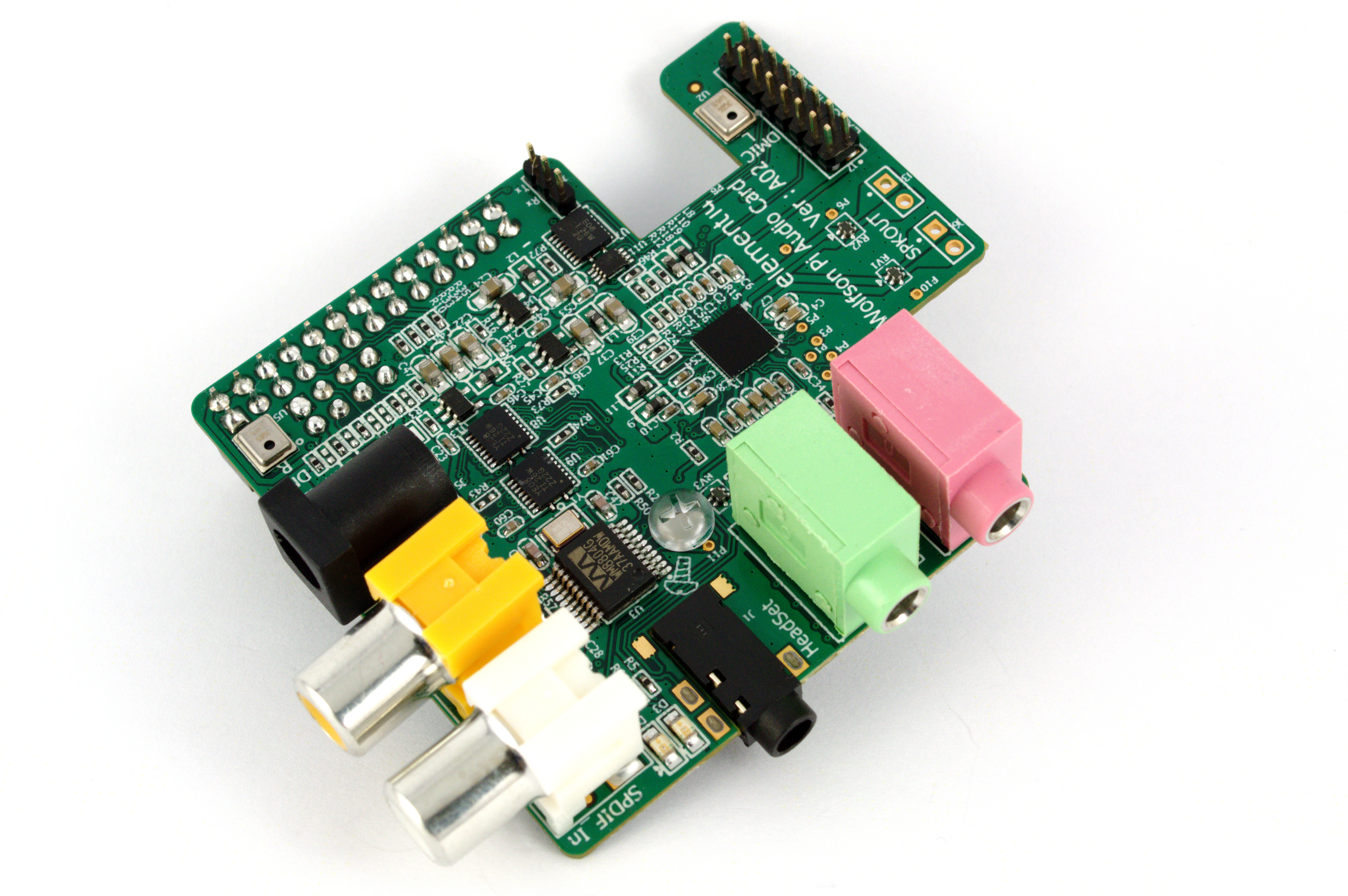
Wolfson Audio Card for Raspberry Pi

Wolfson Microelectronics also produced the Audio Cards for Raspberry Pi Model B Rev 2 named Wolfson Audio Card. After Wolfson Microelectronics was purchased by Cirrus Logic the Audio Card for Raspberry PI Model B+ was renamed Cirrus Logic Audio Card.

== IEEE/RSE James Clerk Maxwell Medal ==
With initial funding from Wolfson, an award called the IEEE/RSE James Clerk Maxwell Medal was established in 2006 by the IEEE and Royal Society of Edinburgh. This award recognizes work with "exceptional impact on the development of electronics and electrical engineering or related fields".
