= Wylfa Newydd nuclear power station =

Proposed power station in Anglesey, Wales

Wylfa Newydd nuclear power station (WND)
- Country: Wales
- Location: Anglesey
- Coordinates: 53.417°N 4.483°W
- Status: Cancelled
- Construction cost: £15 billion
- Owner: Horizon Nuclear Power
- Operator: Horizon Nuclear Power

Nuclear power station
- Reactor type: UK ABWR
- Reactor supplier: Hitachi-GE Nuclear Energy

Power generation
- Units planned: 2
- Nameplate capacity: 2.7 GW

External links
- Website: https://www.horizonnuclearpower.com/our-sites/wylfa-newydd

Wylfa Newydd nuclear power station, also known as Wylfa B, was a proposed project to construct a 2,700 MWe nuclear power station with two ABWR reactors on a site adjacent to the closed Wylfa nuclear power station in Anglesey, Wales. The project was owned by Horizon Nuclear Power which is a subsidiary of Hitachi, who are also the main shareholder in Hitachi-GE Nuclear Energy, the supplier of the reactors for the project.

Hitachi withdrew from the project in September 2020.

== History ==
In 2008, the government decided that new nuclear sites should be constructed on existing sites to replace the UK's ageing fleet of reactors. In 2010, the government revealed that Wylfa was one of the eight sites that it intended to allow the development to occur at.

Horizon Nuclear Power was set up on 14 January 2009 by E.ON UK and RWE npower as a 50:50 joint venture, with the aim to develop at least 6 GW of nuclear capacity in the UK. Following the establishment of the joint venture, the UK government set up an auction for three of the sites, Wylfa, Oldbury and Bradwell. The company announced that it had put forward plans to develop new nuclear generation facilities at all three of the sites. The UK government announced that Horizon won the auction at two of the sites, Wylfa and Oldbury, whilst EDF Energy had won the third site, Bradwell.

Horizon and Areva announced on 2 August 2010 that they had signed an Early Work Agreement for site specific design studies on Areva's EPR reactor which it at the time was considering on building at the site. If the EPR design had been built at the site, it is likely that 2 reactors would have been constructed. Horizon also announced that they had commissioned Westinghouse for preparatory design studies of its AP1000 reactor, which was also a reactor being considered for construction at the site.

Following separate strategic reviews, RWE and EON decided not to continue with the development of new nuclear power stations in the UK through their Horizon joint venture, citing the cost of Germany's nuclear phase-out as one of the reasons for their decision. The partners said they will seek buyers for Horizon to allow the projects to continue. Following this, Westinghouse and Hitachi both placed bids for the firm, with Hitachi winning the bidding and buying Horizon for £700 million.

Hitachi announced its intention to construct two to three Advanced boiling water reactors at the site and submitted its design to the Office for Nuclear Regulation for a Generic Design Assessment (GDA), in order to get approval for the reactor to operate in the UK. The ABWR design finished the UK Generic design assessment in December 2017.

Hitachi intended to commence construction on the site from 2014, with major construction works to commence during 2018–2019; however, as of June 2020, due to many delays in the project, mainly due to funding disputes, construction has not commenced as the project has yet to find financial backing from the UK government.

In September 2020, Hitachi announced its withdrawal from the project and from the sister site at Oldbury. It will close down its development activities, but will work with the UK government and other stakeholders to facilitate future options for the two sites. The decision deadline for the Development Consent Order was subsequently postponed until 31 December 2020, to allow Horizon time to pursue discussions with unnamed parties interested in nuclear new build at Wylfa.

On 30 September 2020, following reports that the US nuclear giant Westinghouse was among the interested parties, Welsh Government Economy Minister Ken Skates confirmed that there was US interest in reviving plans for the site. Westinghouse had lost out in a bid for the site to Hitachi in 2012, and would likely use the AP1000 reactor which had already passed the GDA process when the firm was involved in the Moorside nuclear power station project. On 10 November 2020, it emerged that a US consortium led by engineering group Bechtel was engaged in discussions to resume the Wylfa project and was pitching it as a 'levelling up' opportunity, something that the former Prime Minister Boris Johnson had made one of his top priorities. If a deal is reached, activity would resume rapidly at the Wylfa site, as the consortium aims to provide electricity to the national grid on a similar timescale to that proposed by Horizon, at a market competitive price, despite a switch in reactor technology. The consortium, which also includes US utilities provider Southern Company and Westinghouse, received strong support from the Trump administration, which had repeatedly urged the UK not to pursue nuclear deals with China. A deal would need to be reached with Hitachi for the consortium to acquire the site, and the plans would also be contingent on the funding model to be introduced by the government for large nuclear projects in the UK. The deadline for the Development Consent Order decision was subsequently further deferred until 30 April 2021 to allow talks to continue.

On 28 January 2021, Hitachi formally withdrew its Development Consent Order application. The UK Government indicated that it would "continue to explore future opportunities" for the site.

On 6 March 2024, the UK Government announced it was buying both the Wylfa and Oldbury sites from Hitachi for £160 million.

== Timeline ==
Stage	Status	Date Completed	Notes
Statement of community consultation	Completed	September 2014	
Stage 1 consultation	Completed	8 December 2014	
Updated statement of community consultation	Completed	January 2016	
Stage 2 consultation	Completed	25 October 2016	
Stage 3 consultation	Completed	22 June 2017	
Application submission	In Progress	June 2018	Application withdrawn 28 January 2021
Decision	Not applicable	–	
Construction	Not applicable	–	
Operation	Not applicable	–	

== Design ==
Wylfa Newydd was expected to use two advanced boiling water reactors that have an output of around 1350 MW each to provide a combined output of 2700 MW. The ABWR design was submitted to the Office for Nuclear Regulation in the UK so that it could undergo the Generic design assessment in 2013, once Hitachi had signalled that it intended to continue the development of the site. The ABWR design finished the UK Generic design assessment in December 2017.

== Funding ==
=== Cancellation of the project ===
In January 2019, it was reported that the nuclear plant's funding was questionable, after £2 billion had been spent on the project. The reports noted that a dispute between the proposed plant's builder Hitachi and the UK government over funding had thrown the future construction into doubt, and that an upcoming meeting later in the month would be the location of an announcement regarding the plant's future.

On 17 January 2019, Hitachi announced that it would "suspend" work on the Wylfa project. Duncan Hawthorne, chief executive of Horizon Nuclear Power, said: "...we will take steps to reduce our presence but keep the option to resume development in future". The UK government had been expected to grant a development consent order in a move to restart the project, but subsequently deferred the decision deadline until 31 March 2020, which was then pushed further back to 30 September 2020 due to the COVID-19 pandemic. A spokesperson for Hitachi said that they were disappointed in the delay, but that it was "not unexpected given the current national circumstances".

On 6 August 2020, Horizon responded to the Financial Times who had produced an article on the role of China in British nuclear as well as the role of nuclear in net zero, by saying that,

We strongly agree on nuclear's key role in hitting Net Zero, as covered in today's Financial Times, and Wylfa Newydd can be a big part of that low carbon future. With the right funding model in place, we're ready to remobilise and restart our crucial project on the best new build site in the UK. Substantive progress has already been made at Wylfa Newydd which has the capacity to provide enough clean power to effectively meet all of Wales' electricity demand, a tried and tested reactor technology, world-leading international partners, a competitive price, and a supportive community. It will bring transformative economic benefits for Anglesey, Wales and the UK.

On 16 August 2020, the Financial Times reported that Horizon had been in detailed conversations with the UK government to convince ministers that the project could be restarted quickly and in a cost effective manner, providing the regulated asset base model of funding is approved. The chief executive of Horizon said that if the project were not to continue, Hitachi would withdraw from the project and try to sell the site, potentially raising fears that China General Nuclear Power Group would move into the site. The CEO also added that,

What I've been trying to do over the last period is convince people that our suspension has not in any way undermined our ability to restart quickly. We are ready to go ... but the funding model needs to be in place. We've got a competitively priced project that will generate jobs quickly and really fuel the economy in the region the plant is in. If we can't make our transaction viable in this environment then it's never going to happen.

=== Planned re-start of the project ===
Following the change of government in July 2024, the gigawatt-scale proposal was abandoned – in November 2025, Wylfa was instead chosen as the site for the first planned use of small modular reactors in the UK. It is proposed that Great British Energy – Nuclear build three Rolls-Royce SMR reactors; the final investment decision is expected in 2029.

== Criticism and organised opposition ==
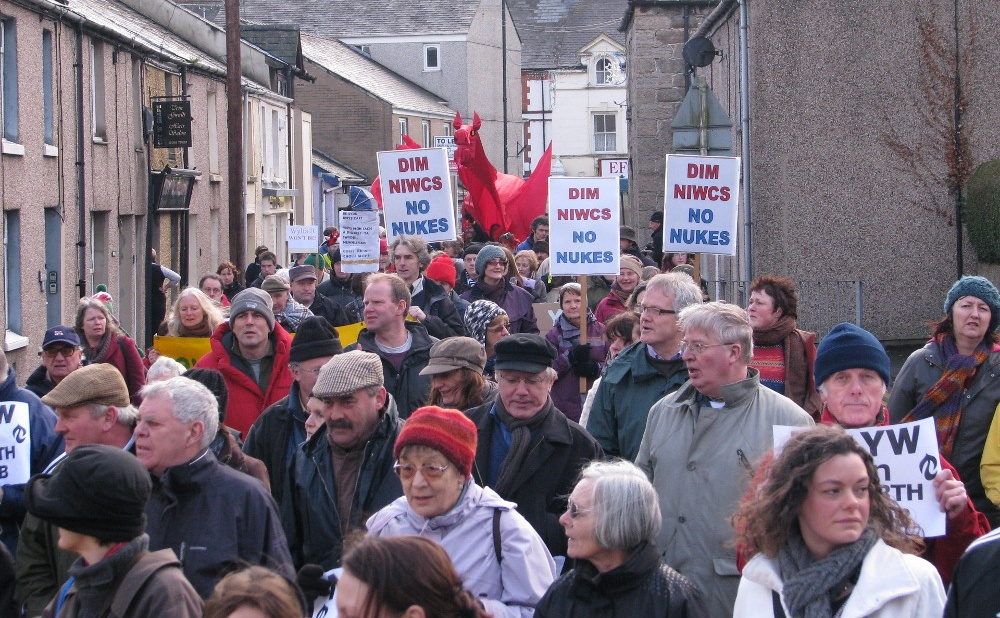
A PAWB (People Against Wylfa-B) protest in Llangefni in 2017

One opposition to Wylfa Newyyd is the local group, People Against Wylfa-B (PAWB), which is completely against the Wylfa development.

Some of the group's main arguments against the development are as follows:

- The funding would be better spent on renewable energy
- The funding will be a waste of taxpayers' money, as German firms EON and RWE could not find funding for the project
- The cost of electricity would increase as a result of the construction as the build would be subsidised
- The health risks are too great as the site would be radioactive for years to come and the number of cancer rates would increase
- The economic benefits to the area are minimal

PAWB have also voiced concerns that the power station could make Anglesey a "target" for a nuclear attack, stating that "safe evacuation" of the island would be impossible.

=== US concerns ===
In June 2020, The Sunday Times reported that the US government had warned Hitachi not to sell Horizon to Chinese companies over security concerns, as China General Nuclear Power Group (CGN) had been convicted of nuclear espionage in the US. Horizon responded that there were no such plans, and stated "We don't comment on speculation. Our focus remains on securing the conditions necessary to restart this crucial project, which would bring transformative economic benefits to the region and play a huge role in helping deliver the UK's climate change commitments."

== See also ==
- Nuclear power in the United Kingdom
- Energy policy of the United Kingdom
- Energy in the United Kingdom
- List of nuclear reactors § United Kingdom
- Proposed nuclear power stations in the United Kingdom
- Wylfa Nuclear Power Station
- Horizon Nuclear Power
