= Wylfa nuclear power station =

Decommissioned nuclear power plant in Wales

Wylfa Nuclear Power Station
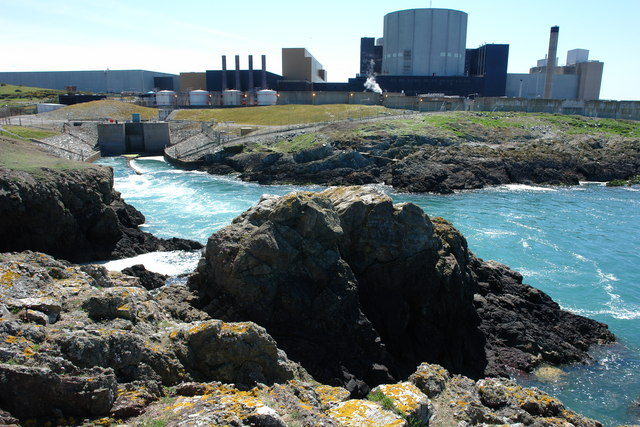
- Country: Wales, United Kingdom
- Location: Anglesey
- Coordinates: 53.417°N 4.483°W
- Status: Decommissioning in progress
- Construction began: 1963
- Commission date: 1971
- Decommission date: 2015
- Owner: Nuclear Decommissioning Authority
- Operator: Nuclear Restoration Services

Nuclear power station
- Reactor type: Magnox
- Reactor supplier: The Nuclear Power Group

Power generation
- Units decommissioned: 2 x 490 MW
- Nameplate capacity: 1,190 MW

External links
- Commons: Related media on Commons

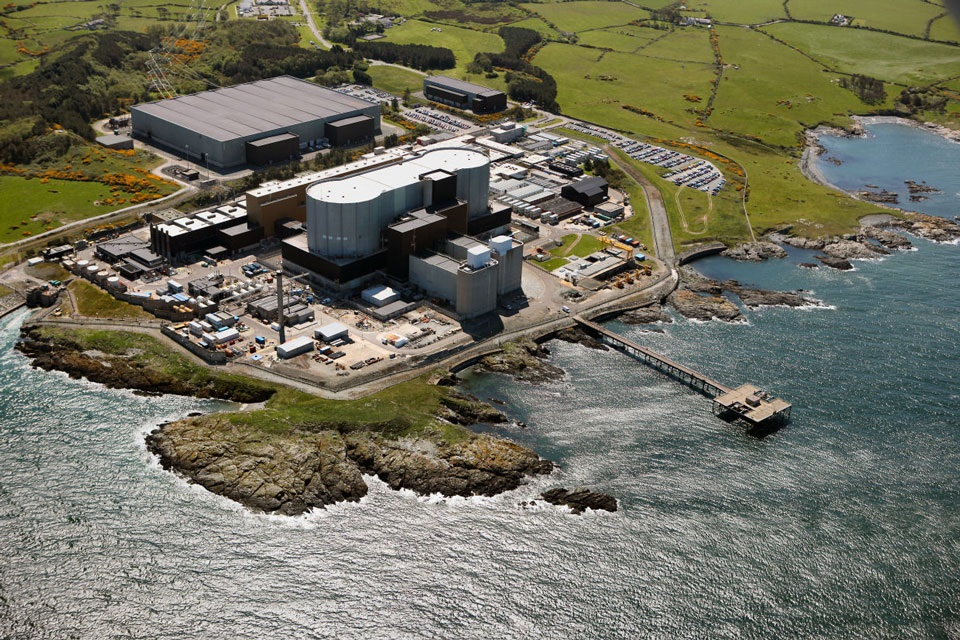
Aerial view of Wylfa just after closure

Wylfa nuclear power station (Welsh: Atomfa'r Wylfa) is a Magnox nuclear power station undergoing decommissioning. Wylfa is situated west of Cemaes Bay on the island of Anglesey, off the northwestern coast of Wales. Construction of the two 490 MW nuclear reactors, known as Reactor 1 and Reactor 2, began in 1963. They became operational in 1971. Wylfa was located on the coast because seawater was used as a coolant.

In 2012, Reactor 2 was shut down. Reactor 1 was switched off on 30 December 2015, ending 44 years of operation at the site.

Wylfa Newydd (literally New Wylfa) was a proposed new nuclear station on a site adjacent to the old plant. An application to build two advanced boiling water reactors was submitted by Horizon Nuclear Power to the Office of Nuclear Regulation on 4 April 2017. In September 2020, parent company Hitachi withdrew from the project. In 2022, the UK Government expressed interest in the construction of a possible set of two EPR reactors on the site, and in 2024 announced it would purchase the site from Hitachi.

== History ==
Wylfa was the second nuclear power station to be built in Wales after Trawsfynydd in 1959. Following the closure of Trawsfynydd in 1991, Wylfa became Wales' only nuclear power station.

Construction of Wylfa, which was undertaken by British Nuclear Design and Construction (BNDC), a consortium backed by English Electric, Babcock & Wilcox Ltd and Taylor Woodrow Construction, began in 1963. The reactors were supplied by The Nuclear Power Group (TNPG) and the turbines by English Electric. These were the largest and last Magnox-type reactors to be built in the UK. Wylfa was also the second British nuclear power station, following Oldbury, to have a pre-stressed concrete pressure vessel instead of steel for easier construction and enhanced safety.

Wylfa's two 490 MW Magnox nuclear reactors – Reactor 1 and Reactor 2 – became operational in 1971. They typically supplied 23 GW h of electricity daily when they were both in service.

Although the original design output was 1,190 MW, unexpected accelerated ("breakaway") corrosion of mild steel components of the gas circuit in hot CO_{2} was detected even before the first reactor began operating. The channel gas outlet temperature, the temperature at which the CO_{2} leaves the fuel channels in the reactor core, had to be reduced, initially dropping the power output to 840 MW, which was later raised to 980 MW as more experience accumulated. A considerable portion of the output, up to 255 MW, was consumed by the nearby Anglesey Aluminium smelting plant.

The graphite cores each weigh 3,800 tonnes (3,700 long tons); 6,156 vertical fuel channels contain 49,248 natural uranium magnox-clad fuel elements, hence the name magnox reactor. A further 200 channels allow boron control rods to enter the reactor and control the nuclear reaction. The primary coolant in the reactors is carbon dioxide gas.

The site is managed by Nuclear Restoration Services (formerly Magnox Ltd, formerly British Nuclear Group, formerly Nuclear Electric, formerly National Power, formerly the Central Electricity Generating Board (CEGB)) which is a subsidiary of the site owner, the Nuclear Decommissioning Authority (NDA). The NDA's purpose is to oversee the decommissioning and clean-up of the UK's civil nuclear legacy.

During its operational life substantial works were needed to strengthen the reactors against deteriorating welds discovered in the safety review in April 2000. Amid public controversy, Greenpeace issued an independent safety appraisal, commissioned a report from Large Associates, critical of the plant and its restart plans, but the permit to restart operation was given in August 2001. In addition to welding weaknesses, radiolytic depletion of the graphite moderator blocks was still of concern and PAWB continue to campaign for early shut-down of the plant as well as against any nuclear replacement.

=== Closure and decommissioning ===
On 20 July 2006, the NDA announced that the station would be shut down in 2010 to enable the closure and decommissioning of the Magnox spent fuel reprocessing plant at Sellafield. Springfields Fuels Limited ended production of Magnox fuel elements in 2008 due to these plans. In 2010, the NDA announced an extension to 2012, beyond Wylfa's 40th anniversary as a generating power station in January 2011, due to schedule slippage at Sellafield which would allow Wylfa additional time before final defuelling. At this time, a strategy was also devised to maximise the generation from the remaining fuel stock given that new fuel could no longer be manufactured. This required a change in the distribution of fuel within the reactors, as well as the closure of Reactor 2 in 2012 to allow this fuel to be transferred into Reactor 1. Reactor 2 ceased generating on 25 April 2012 at 19:02 BST, allowing Reactor 1 to continue to operate. A licence extension to operate Reactor 1 until 31 December 2015 was granted in September 2014.

Reactor 1 was shut down on 30 December 2015. Defuelling started in 2016, and was completed in 2019. Defuelling and removal of most buildings is expected to take until 2025, followed by a care and maintenance phase from 2025 to 2096. Demolition of reactor buildings and final site clearance is planned for 2096 to 2101.

== Future nuclear plant plans ==
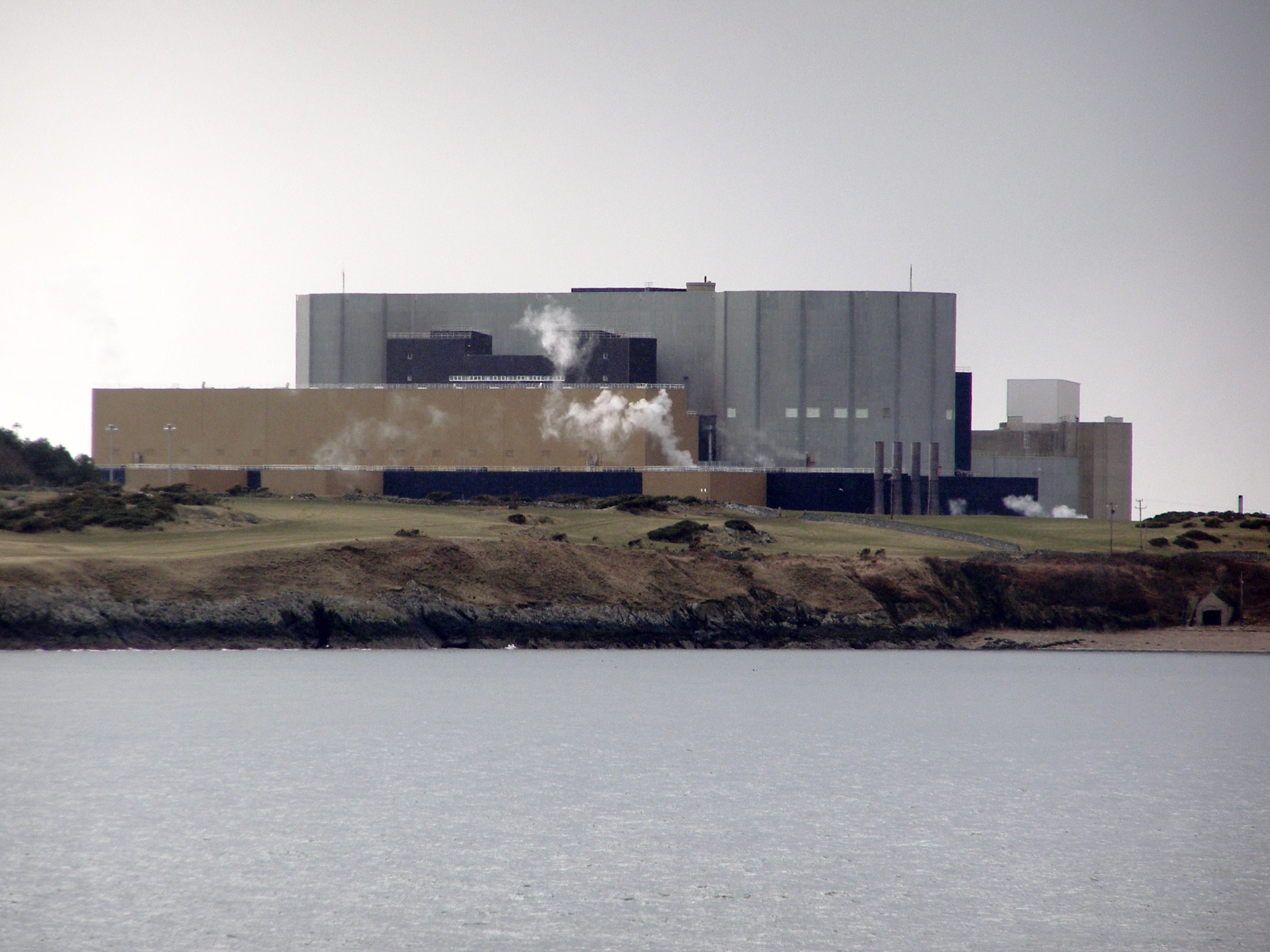
Wylfa nuclear power station from Llanbadrig Point

A second plant named Wylfa Newydd (previously referred to as Wylfa B) has been proposed. Wylfa Newydd's proposal was the subject of local opposition, led by the group People Against Wylfa B (PAWB – pawb is Welsh for 'everyone'). In March 2006 the local council voted to extend the life of Wylfa A and to support the construction of Wylfa B, citing the potential loss of employment in the smelter works and nuclear station.

=== Horizon/Hitachi plans ===
Horizon Nuclear Power, originally an E.ON and RWE joint venture, bought by Hitachi in 2012, announced in 2009 intentions to install about 3,000 MWe of new nuclear plant at Wylfa. Horizon planned to build two advanced boiling water reactors (ABWRs) at a site to the south of the existing Wylfa station. On 18 October 2010, the British government announced that Wylfa was one of the eight sites it considered suitable for future nuclear power stations.

In January 2012, 300 anti-nuclear protesters took to the streets of Llangefni, against plans to build a new nuclear power station at Wylfa. The march was organised by organisations including Pobl Atal Wylfa B, Greenpeace and Cymdeithas yr Iaith, which are supporting farmer Richard Jones who is in dispute with Horizon.

In 2013, Horizon planned initial site work to start at Wylfa in 2015, with building work starting in 2018 and generation starting in the mid-2020s. This timescale was delayed, and Hitachi planned to make the final investment decision in 2019.

On 4 April 2017, Horizon submitted a Site Licence Application to the Office for Nuclear Regulation. The scheme was extended to include a tunnel under the Menai Strait to carry the power cables to protect the conservation worth of the Strait and the Area of Outstanding Natural Beauty. In December 2017, Horizon believed the consensus of government and industry was that the Contract for Difference financing model used for Hinkley Point C nuclear power station, involving fully private sector financing, would not be used for subsequent nuclear plants, and was in discussions with government about alternative finance mechanisms.

The UK government intended to invest £5 billion in the new power station. Previously, government policy had been not to invest directly in new nuclear projects. Horizon Nuclear Power submitted a Development Consent Order application for the Wylfa Newydd project to the Planning Inspectorate on 1 June 2018.

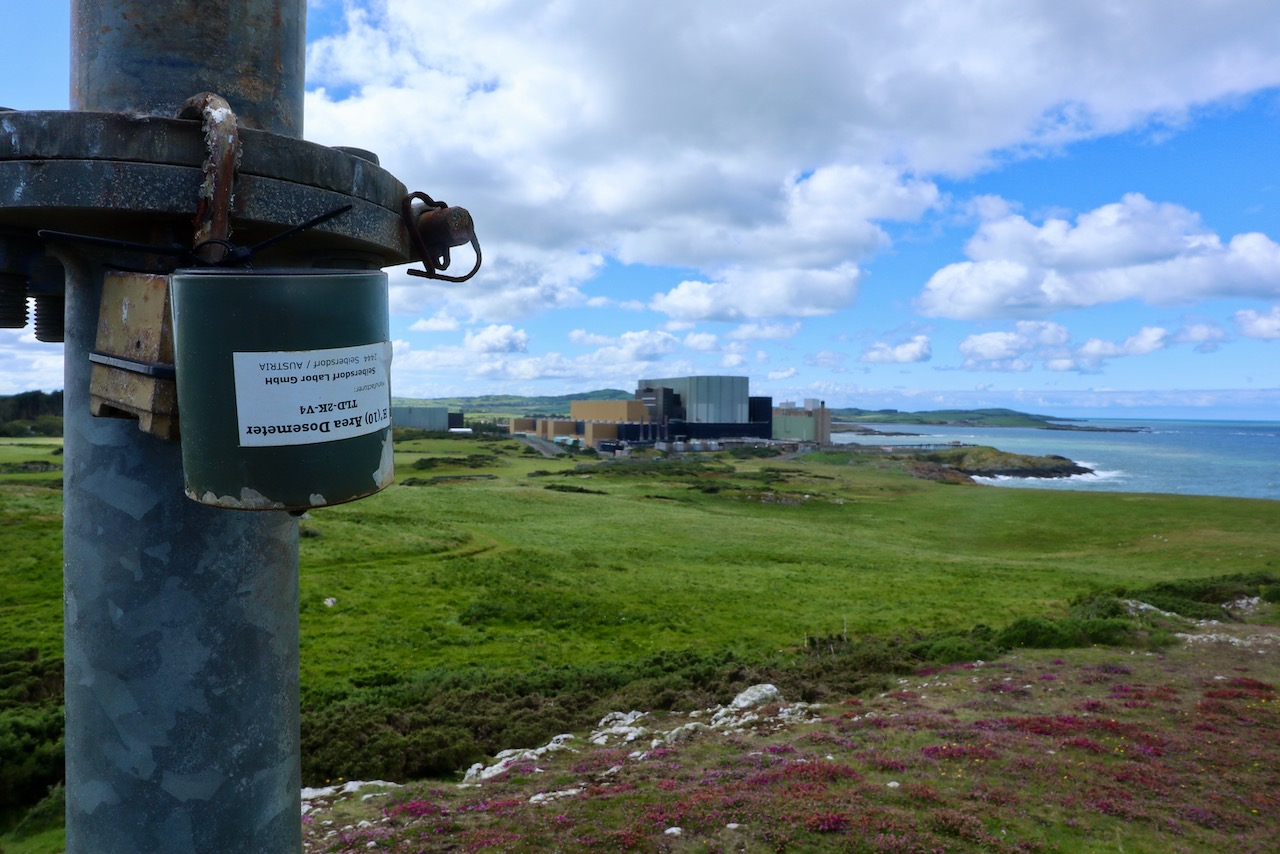
Area Dosemeter close to Wylfa Nuclear Power Station

==== Cancellation ====
In January 2019, it was reported that the nuclear plant's funding was questionable, after £2 billion had been spent on the project. The reports noted that a dispute between the proposed plant's builder Hitachi and the UK government over funding had thrown the future construction into doubt, and that an upcoming meeting later in the month would be the location of an announcement regarding the plant's future.

On 17 January 2019, Hitachi announced that it would "suspend" work on the Wylfa project. Duncan Hawthorne, chief executive of Horizon Nuclear Power, said: "...we will take steps to reduce our presence but keep the option to resume development in future". The UK government had been expected to grant a development consent order in a move to restart the project, but subsequently deferred the decision deadline until 30 September 2020.

In September 2020, Hitachi announced its withdrawal from the project and from the sister site at Oldbury. It will close down its development activities, but will work with the UK government and other stakeholders to facilitate future options for the two sites. On 28 January 2021, Hitachi formally withdrew its Development Consent Order application. The government indicated that it would "continue to explore future opportunities" for the site.

=== Other proposals ===
In November 2020, it was reported that a US consortium of Bechtel, Southern Company and Westinghouse Electric Company was in talks with the British Government about reviving the Wylfa Newydd project, by building AP1000 reactors at the site.

In January 2021, Shearwater Energy presented plans for a hybrid plant, to consist of a wind farm and small modular reactors (SMRs), to be installed adjacent to the existing Wylfa power station but separate from the proposed Wylfa Newydd site. Shearwater has signed a memorandum of understanding with NuScale Power for the SMRs. The plant could start generation as early as 2027 and would ultimately produce up to 3 GW of electricity and power a hydrogen generation unit producing up to 3 million kg of hydrogen per year. In April 2022, it was announced that Wylfa and Oldbury sites are candidates for two sets of EPR reactors to be constructed as the UK plans to construct up to eight new reactors this decade. These sites would be part of the next set of plants with the first being Hinkley Point C and Sizewell C. The Wylfa and Oldbury sites are likely to begin construction next parliament.

In March 2024, during the Spring Budget, Chancellor Jeremy Hunt announced that the site would be purchased from Hitachi for £160m. This led to Wylfa being selected as the UK government's preferred site for a gigawatt-scale plant in May 2025.

Following the change of government in July 2024, the gigawatt-scale proposal was abandoned – in November 2025, Wylfa was instead chosen as the site for the first planned use of small modular reactors in the UK. It is proposed that Great British Energy – Nuclear build three Rolls-Royce SMRs; the final investment decision is expected in 2029.

== See also ==
- Nuclear power in the United Kingdom
- Anti-nuclear movement in the United Kingdom
- Economics of new nuclear power plants
- Proposed nuclear power stations in the United Kingdom
