= Strathclyde Business School =

Business school in Glasgow City, Scotland

Coordinates: 55.861°N 4.245°W

- Type: Public business school
- Established: 1947–1971 Department of Industrial Administration; 1950–1964 Glasgow School of Management; 1964–1982 School of Business and Administration; 1973 Strathclyde Business School (faculty 1982)
- Parent institution: Strathclyde University
- Accreditation: Association of MBAs (AMBA); EFMD Quality Improvement System (EQUIS); Association to Advance Collegiate Schools of Business (AACSB)
- Dean: David Hillier
- Faculty: ca 200
- Students: > 4,500
- Location: Glasgow, Scotland, UK
- Campus: Urban
- Colours: Red and White
- Website: www.strath.ac.uk/business/

The Strathclyde Business School (SBS) is one of four faculties forming the University of Strathclyde in Glasgow, Scotland. Founded in 1973, but tracing its history back to the establishment of the Royal College of Science and Technology's Department of Industrial Administration in 1947, the school is located on Cathedral Street within the John Anderson campus of the university. It offers courses for business education and management development.

Strathclyde Business School has around 200 academic staff and more than 4500 students (1960 undergraduate and 2615 postgraduate). The faculty contains seven departments and six specialist centres. The school has international centres in Bahrain, Greece, Malaysia, Oman, and UAE.

== History ==
Management education started at Glasgow's Royal College of Science and Technology in 1947 with the establishment of the Department of Industrial Administration. The Glasgow School of Management was established in 1950 as a joint venture between this department and the Glasgow and West of Scotland Commercial College (which became the Scottish College of Commerce in 1955).

In 1964, the College of Commerce and the Royal College merged to form the University of Strathclyde. There had been hope that the government would establish a business school at the new university but, following the Franks Report in 1963, government resources were concentrated on funding business schools in Manchester and London instead. From 1964, the university also had a School of Business and Administration. Despite the lack of a business school, Strathclyde was a flourishing centre of business education with 370 undergraduates, 86 postgraduates, over 400 part-time diploma students, and short post-experience courses being given to over 500 people a year at the Chesters residential centre. It established an MBA course in 1966 within the Department of Industrial Administration.

In 1970, the government was persuaded to fund a business school in Scotland but rather than being established at a single university the Scottish Business School was established as a partnership between the universities of Strathclyde, Glasgow and Edinburgh in 1971; it would eventually take in Stirling and Heriot-Watt before being transformed into the Confederation of Scottish Business Schools in 1987 and then the Association for Management Education and Training in Scotland in 1989. Also in 1971, Strathclyde's Department of Industrial Administration became part of the Department of Administration, and in 1973 the Strathclyde Business School was established. Business education continued to be split across multiple departments, with the business school offering post-experience postgraduate courses, the School of Business and Administration offering undergraduate and postgraduate courses, and other postgraduate management courses being offered by the Department of Production Management and Manufactory Technology. In 1982, a reorganisation of the university saw the School of Business and Administration closed and the business school elevated to a faculty containing multiple departments.

== Organisation and administration ==
=== Academic departments ===
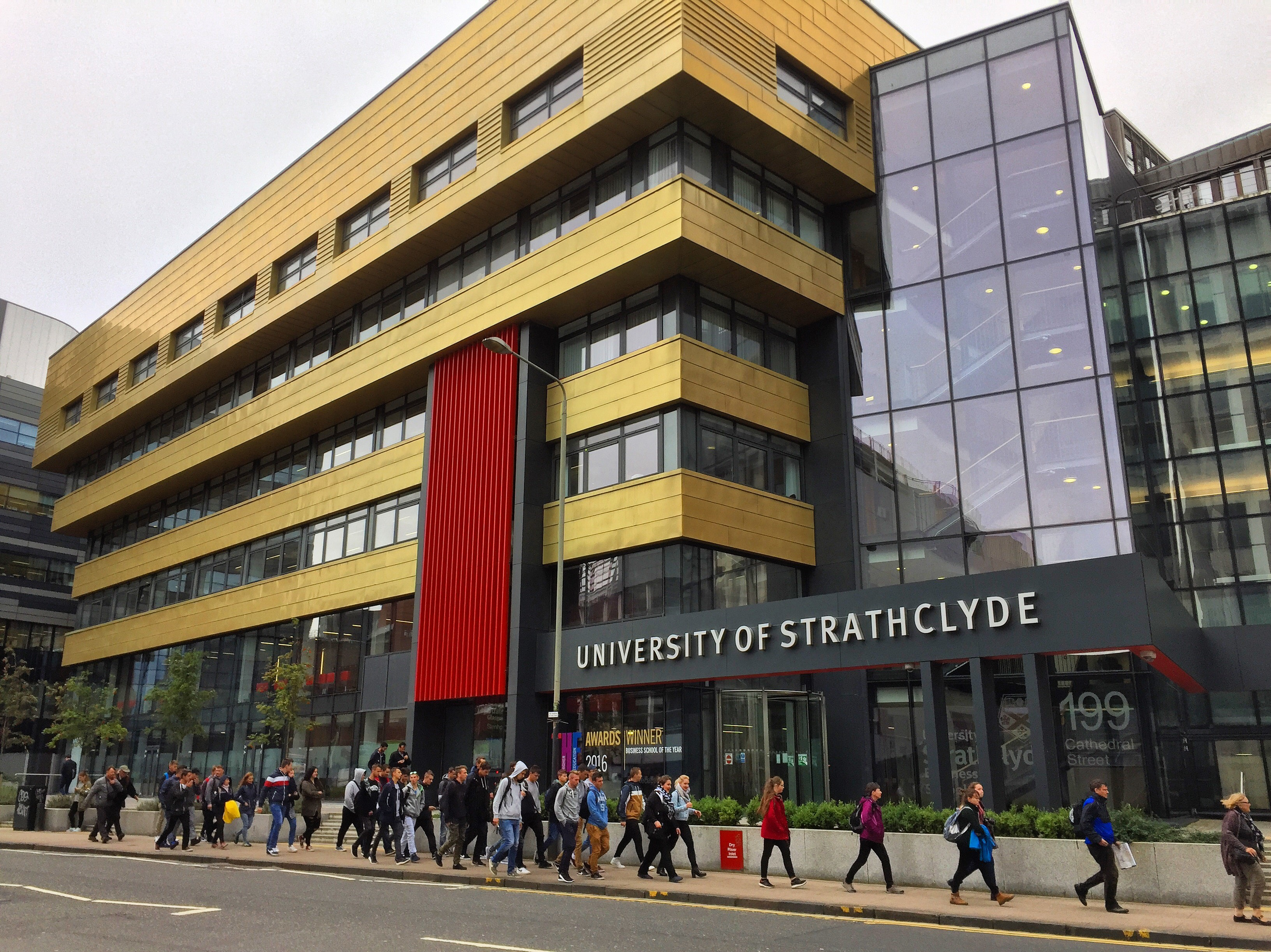
Strathclyde Business School main building

There are seven academic departments within the business school:

- Accounting and Finance
- Economics
- Hunter Centre for Entrepreneurship
- Management Science
- Marketing
- MBA and General Management
- Work, Employment and Organisation

The business school also has six specialist centres as mentioned below:

- Fraser of Allander Institute (regional economic research)
- Centre for Financial Regulation and Innovation
- Scottish Centre for Employment Research
- Stephen Young Institute (international business and innovation research)
- Informed Decision Analytics (IDeA)
- Strathclyde Executive Education and Development

=== International centres ===
The school launched its first international centre in Singapore in 1988, followed in short order by Hong Kong and Malaysia. As of 2023, the Strathclyde MBA is offered at five international centres:

- Bahrain
- Greece
- Malaysia
- Oman
- UAE

== Academic profile ==
=== Accreditation ===
According to the school, Strathclyde was the first triple accredited business school in Scotland, holding accreditation from: AMBA, AACSB and EQUIS.

It's various departments also hold a number of discipline-specific accreditations:

- Accounting and finance programmes are accredited by the Institute of Chartered Accountants of Scotland, the Association of Chartered Certified Accountants (ACCA), the Chartered Institute of Management Accountants (CIMA) and the CFA Institute University Recognition Program.
- The Department of Work, Employment and Organisation is an "approved centre" of the Chartered Institute of Personnel and Development (CIPD).
- Degrees in hospitality and tourism are accredited by the Institute of Hospitality.

=== Research ===
In the 2021 Research Excellence Framework, Strathclyde Business School was rated 24th in the UK for its research quality (GPA) and 16th for research power, with 42% of its research graded 4* (world leading) and 42% graded 3* (internationally excellent).

=== Reputation and rankings ===
In November 2016, Strathclyde Business School was awarded THE Business School of the Year in the Times Higher Education Awards.

In the Times Higher Education 2013 Awards, the university won the "UK Entrepreneurial University of the Year 2013" award, making Strathclyde the first Scottish university to hold the title.

== Notable alumni ==
- John Francis McFall, Lord Speaker of the House of Lords
- Alastair Johnston, Co-Chief Executive Officer of sports marketing firm IMG
- Rajiv Mehrishi, IAS, former Home Secretary and Finance Secretary of India.
- James McColl, Chairman and Chief Executive of Clyde Blowers Ltd
- Sir Tom Hunter, CEO of Sports Division
- Alastair Storey, chairman and CEO of Westbury Street Holdings
- John Barton, British businessman, the chairman of Next plc and EasyJet
- Duncan Hawthorne, CEO of Horizon Nuclear Power
- Nigel Clifford, CEO of Ordnance Survey, the British national mapping agency
- Hugh Hendry, CEO of Eclectica Asset Management
- Inderjit Singh, former COO of Texas Instruments, and politician in Singapore's parliament
- Gustavo Alfredo Leite Gusinky, Minister of Industry and Commerce of Paraguay
- David Mundell, Secretary of State for Scotland 2015–2019
