= PAWB =

PAWB may refer to

- PAWB (People Against Wylfa-B), a protest movement against the expansion of Wylfa Nuclear Power Station
- Beaver Airport, Alaska, ICAO-code PAWB
