= Greg Jackson (businessman) =

British businessman

Greg Sean Jackson CBE
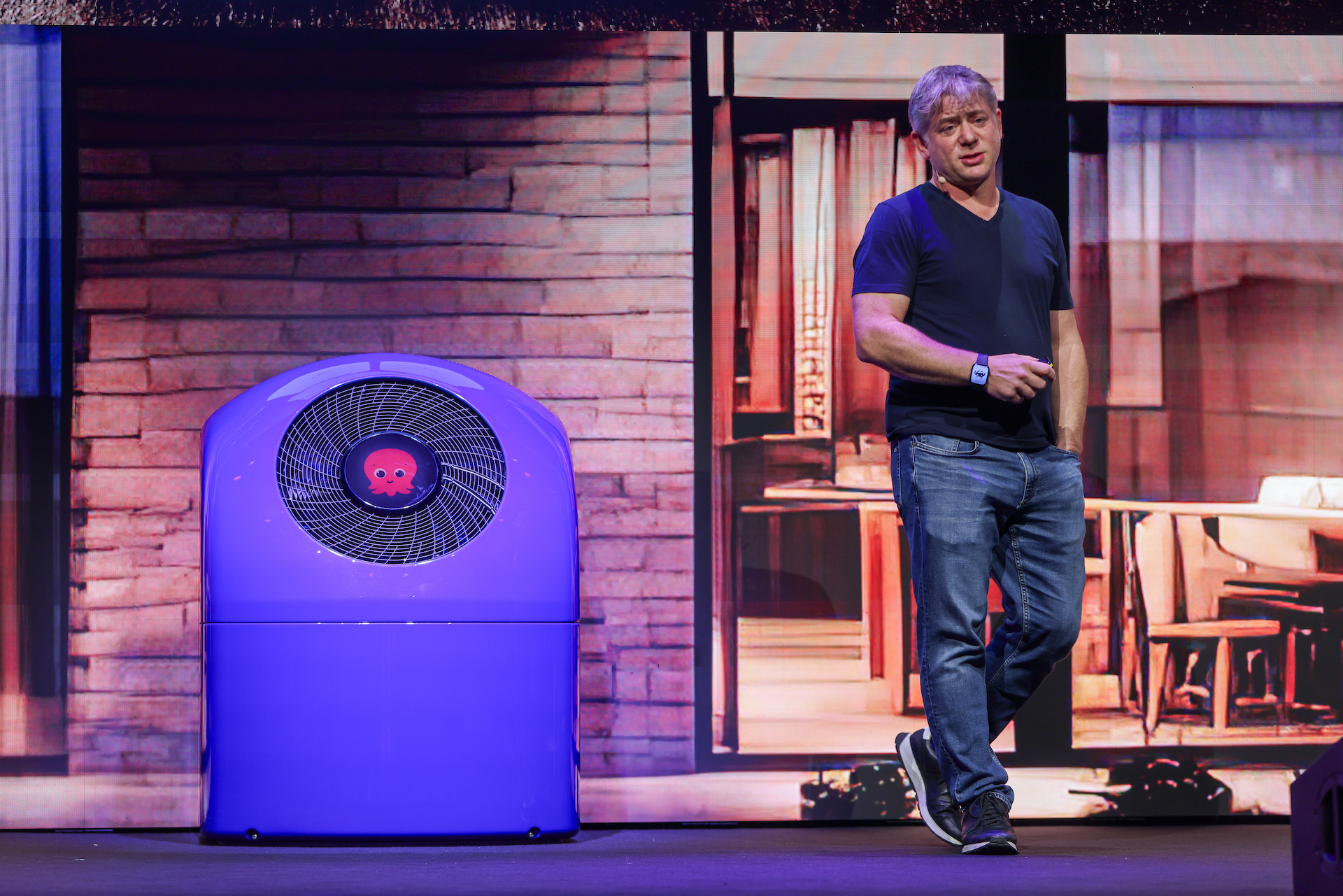
- Octopus CEO Greg Jackson
- Born: September 1971 (age 55); Hanover
- Occupation: Businessman
- Known for: Founder of Octopus Energy
- Awards: Commander of the Order of the British Empire

Greg Jackson CBE (born September 1971) is a British entrepreneur and businessman who is the founder and CEO of Octopus Energy, the largest domestic energy supplier in the United Kingdom, serving 14 million accounts in 8 million households, and active in 27 countries.

== Biography ==
Jackson grew up in Halifax, West Yorkshire, and then Saltburn-by-the-Sea in North Yorkshire. He became interested in electronics and computer coding in the early 1980s, leaving school at 16 to programme computer games. He told the BBC that he remembered having his energy supply cut off when he was growing up. He returned to sixth form college to study economics, before attending Pembroke College, Cambridge.

According to website Move Upstream, "before the age of 30, he had owned and/or managed a number of small businesses employing 4–60 people and turning over £400k to £4m." Jackson founded companies including e-commerce firm C360 and Consultant Connect, a telemedicine provider, and was a director of several businesses, including Zopa, a peer-to-peer lender. He is also an angel investor in companies including Xlinks, which planned to build the world's largest subsea cable to bring renewable energy from Morocco to the UK, and carbon accounting company Altruistiq.

He founded Octopus Energy in 2016, and by 2024 the company was valued at over $9 billion. The company is now the largest energy supplier in the UK, the first company to supplant British Gas since market liberalisation in the 1990s. By 2024, Octopus Energy Group had raised over $2.3bn in funding. The Financial Times reported in 2023 that "Octopus’s credentials as a disrupter have helped win the backing of investors including Generation Investment Management, chaired by former US vice-president Al Gore" among further institutional investors and energy giants.

Jackson also founded software technology platform Kraken Technologies to introduce efficiencies across customer needs and operational fulfilment. A minority stake in the platform was sold for $1billion in December 2025, valuing Kraken at $9 billion.

In August 2025, Jackson was appointed to a three-year term as a non-executive member of the Cabinet Office board; he said he would press government departments to use technology to implement policies more rapidly and efficiently. Jackson is also a member of the government's Industrial Strategy Advisory Council. In January 2026, Jackson became the first Co-Chair of the Department of Science, Innovation and Technology (DSIT) specialist unit CustomerFirst, seeking to modernise UK public services.

Jackson lives in London and has two children.

== Honours and awards ==
In the 2024 King's Birthday Honours, Jackson was appointed Commander of the Order of the British Empire (CBE). In the same year, he was named in the 100 Most Influential Climate Leaders in Business in Time magazine's Time 100 Climate. Jackson is an honorary fellow of Pembroke College, Cambridge and holds an honorary doctorate from Teesside University. In April 2026, Jackson was named "Business Leader of the Year" at the British Business Awards, and in May 2026 he was named "Personality of the Year in the City AM Awards 2026.
