= Conversocial =

Software company

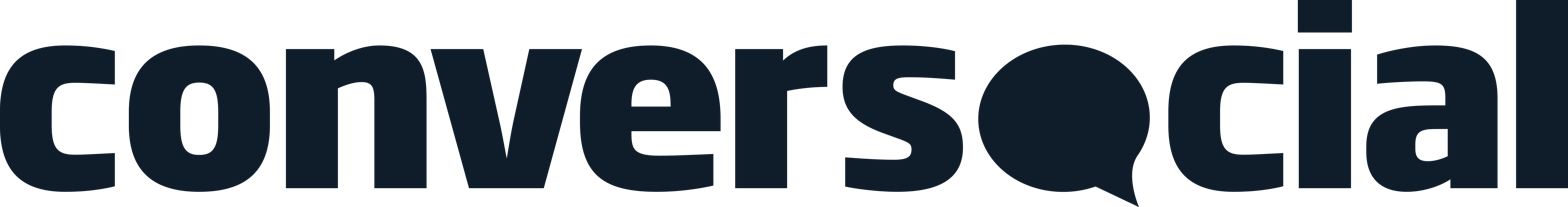
- Industry: Software
- Founded: 2009; 17 years ago
- Fate: Acquired by VERINT (VRNT)
- Headquarters: New York City, US; London, UK
- Key people: Ido Bornstein Hacohen (CEO) Joshua March & Dan Lester (Founders)
- Website: conversocial.com

Conversocial was a privately held provider of social customer service software headquartered in New York City and founded in London. In August 2021 Conversocial was acquired by Verint a call center leader in an all cash transaction. Companies such as Google, Barclaycard, Hertz, Tesco, Sainsbury's, and Volaris use the Verint Conversocial SAAS platform to manage the flow of customer service inquiries and discussions on social media channels. Prior to being acquired by Verint Conversocial investors included - Octopus Venture, Molten, and Dawn Capital. Ido Bornstein Hacohen served as the CEO of Conversocial.

== History ==
Conversocial was founded by Joshua March and Dan Lester in November 2009 in London. After spending two years working with applications for social media for both the Facebook Developer Garage London and iPlatform, they realized that social media was the future of communications online. After iPlatform, which they sold to social media marketing company Betapond in 2012, March focused solely on Conversocial.

In April 2017 Ido Bornstein Hacohen joined Conversocial as COO and in April 2019 Ido was appointed as the CEO of Conversocial.

Pioneering customer service on social and messaging apps, in February 2016, Twitter announced that Conversocial is a Twitter Official Partner. In February 2017, Twitter announced that it would deepen its partnership with Conversocial for greater growth and monetization in the area of social customer service.

Conversocial was also the first to support Meta's FB, Messenger, Instagram and WhatsApp for business to consumer communications - in 2017 Conversocial became one of the main marketing partners for Facebook and was the first to launch support for these channels on its customer service platform.

In 2019 Conversocial acquired the AI-focused company Assist.io and added AI-based chat bots capabilities to its platform supporting both agent-assisted customer service and automated customer service.

In 2020 Conversocial was acquired by VERINT for 50 million in cash.

== Funding ==
In 2012 Conversocial expanded to the USA, opening its headquarters in Manhattan, New York.

In 2013, Conversocial received $4.4 million in additional funding from a round led by Octopus Ventures.

In 2014, Conversocial received $5 million in additional funding from a round led by Octopus Ventures.

In 2015, Conversocial received $11 million in additional funding from a round led by Dawn Capital.

== Product ==
Conversocial is a real-time customer service platform that allows brands to provide customer support, at scale, through messaging and social media apps (SMS, WhatsApp, Instagram, Facebook, Twitter and more). Conversocial's functions include:

- Priority Response and Queue Engine – The self-learning prioritization engine uses natural language processing and analysis of historic responses to prioritize messages and route them to the appropriate chat bot or agent.
- Conversation History
- Team Management – Conversocial's collaborative platform lets teams share social communication, while management retains control of social platforms.
- AI Chat support for agent assist and automated customer service
- Analytics & Reporting – Measures important data such as customer satisfaction, agent response times, and issue frequency.

== Leadership ==
Conversocial was founded by Joshua March appeared on CNBC, Bloomberg, Fox Business, and BBC as a commentator on customer service and social media, and was named one of 2012’s Top 10 Hottest Digital Marketers by iMedia Connection.

In 2017 Ido Bornstein Hacohen joined Conversocial as COO. With a vast experience in the customer engagement space, previously serving in executive roles at companies like LivePerson and SAP, Ido led all commercial and GTM functions at Conversocial including sales, marketing, partnerships, customer success and professional services.

In 2019 Ido was promoted to lead Conversocial as CEO, during his tenure Conversocial's platform won multiple awards, was positioned as a leader in Customer engagement space and was featured as leader and innovator in industry analysts reports, while Conversocial kept on growing its international customer base and profitability.

In 2020 Ido led the sale of Conversocial by Verint. Ido stayed in Verint in a leadership position and oversaw the integration of the Conversocial platform into the Verint SAAS offering.

== Awards and recognition ==
Conversocial was named a "cool vendor" in the CRM Customer Service and Social Report published by leading analyst firm Gartner The UK publication V3 has also named Conversocial one of Top 10 up-and-coming UK technology start-ups for 2013.

In 2010 Conversocial won "Highly Commended" in the Best Platform category of TechCrunch's The Europas- European Startup Awards. In 2011, Conversocial was the overall winner in the Best Advertising or Marketing Tech Startup category, and in 2013 they were "Highly Commended" in the Best Advertising or Marketing Tech Startup.

In 2021 an Automated Chat Bot developed by Conversocial for Meta won the Shorty Award together with the Facebook Creative X team.
