= Nick Baldwin =

British businessman

Nicholas Peter Baldwin CBE FIMechE FIET (born 17 December 1952) is a British businessman, and the chairman of the Office for Nuclear Regulation, and a former chief executive of Powergen (E.ON UK since July 2004)

== Early life ==
He was born in Gosport.

He gained a BSc in Mechanical Engineering from City University (now City, University of London), studying from 1971 to 1975. He later gained an MSc in economics from Birkbeck College.

== Career ==
=== Powergen ===
He joined Powergen in 1989. From 2001 to 2002 he was chief executive of Powergen. Powergen was sold to E.ON of Germany for £9.6bn, completed in January 2002. The UK business of National Power was bought by RWE for £3.1bn in 2000.

=== Nuclear Decommissioning Authority ===
He was interim chairman from 2007 to 2008 of the Nuclear Decommissioning Authority. He worked there from 2004 to 2011.

=== Office for Nuclear Regulation ===
He became Chairman of the Office for Nuclear Regulation in 2011. The ONR became an independent public organisation in April 2014.

Baldwin was appointed Commander of the Order of the British Empire (CBE) in the 2017 Birthday Honours for services to nuclear safety and security and to the charitable sector.

He was replaced in the role by Mark McAllister on the 1 April 2019.

== Personal life ==
He married Adrienne Plunkett in March 2002 in Evesham. They have a son and daughter. He lives in Worcester. In September 2000 he was hit by lightning, and suffered serious burns and head injuries, whilst sheltering under a tree at Bryce Canyon National Park in Utah, when on a horse-riding holiday; he was taken to hospital in Salt Lake City, where he was in intensive care for three days. A lightning bolt can carry up to one million volts in electricity. He was with his wife and two children at the time, and has no memory of the incident, and for two days after that.

== See also ==
- Nuclear power in the United Kingdom
- Wulf Bernotat, former chief executive of E.ON (in Essen), and former chairman of Powergen

Government offices
Preceded by New organisation	Chairman of the Office for Nuclear Regulation; April 2011 - April 2019	Succeeded by Mark McAllister
Preceded by Sir Anthony Cleaver	Chairman of the Nuclear Decommissioning Authority; August 2007 - February 2008	Succeeded by Stephen Henwood
Business positions
Preceded by Ed Wallis	Chief Executive of Powergen; 2001 - June 2002	Succeeded by Ed Wallis
