= Gloat (company) =

AI company

- Formerly: Workey
- Company type: Private
- Industry: Human resource management
- Founded: 2015; 11 years ago (as Workey)
- Website: gloat.com

Gloat is a company that developed an AI-based employee matching software (talent marketplace). Employees are matched to relevant projects, gigs, mentorships, and full-time roles based on their interests, career ambitions, skills, and experiences. Enterprises such as Unilever, Schneider Electric, Estēe Lauder, Standard Chartered, Pepsico, Fidelity, HSBC, Woolworths, Seagate, MetLife, Nestlé, and Mastercard have used Gloat's technology.

== History ==
Gloat was founded in 2015 by Danny Shteinberg, Ben Reuveni, and Amichai Schreiber. The co-founders currently serve as Chief Marketing Officer (CMO), Chief Executive Officer (CEO), and Chief Technology Officer (CTO), respectively.

On June 16, 2021, Gloat closed a $57 million Series C funding round led by Accel, with participation from existing investors including Eight Roads Ventures, Intel Capital, Magma Venture Partners, and PICO Partners. In June 2022, the company raised $90 million in a Series D round, led by Generation Investment Management.

As of 2021, the software had facilitated over 31,000 internal gig connections.

In March 2026, Gloat launched Gloat Agentic HR, an AI agent platform designed to integrate with enterprise human capital management systems and workplace collaboration tools such as Microsoft Teams, Slack, and Microsoft Copilot.
