= Stratajet =

English company for booking private jets

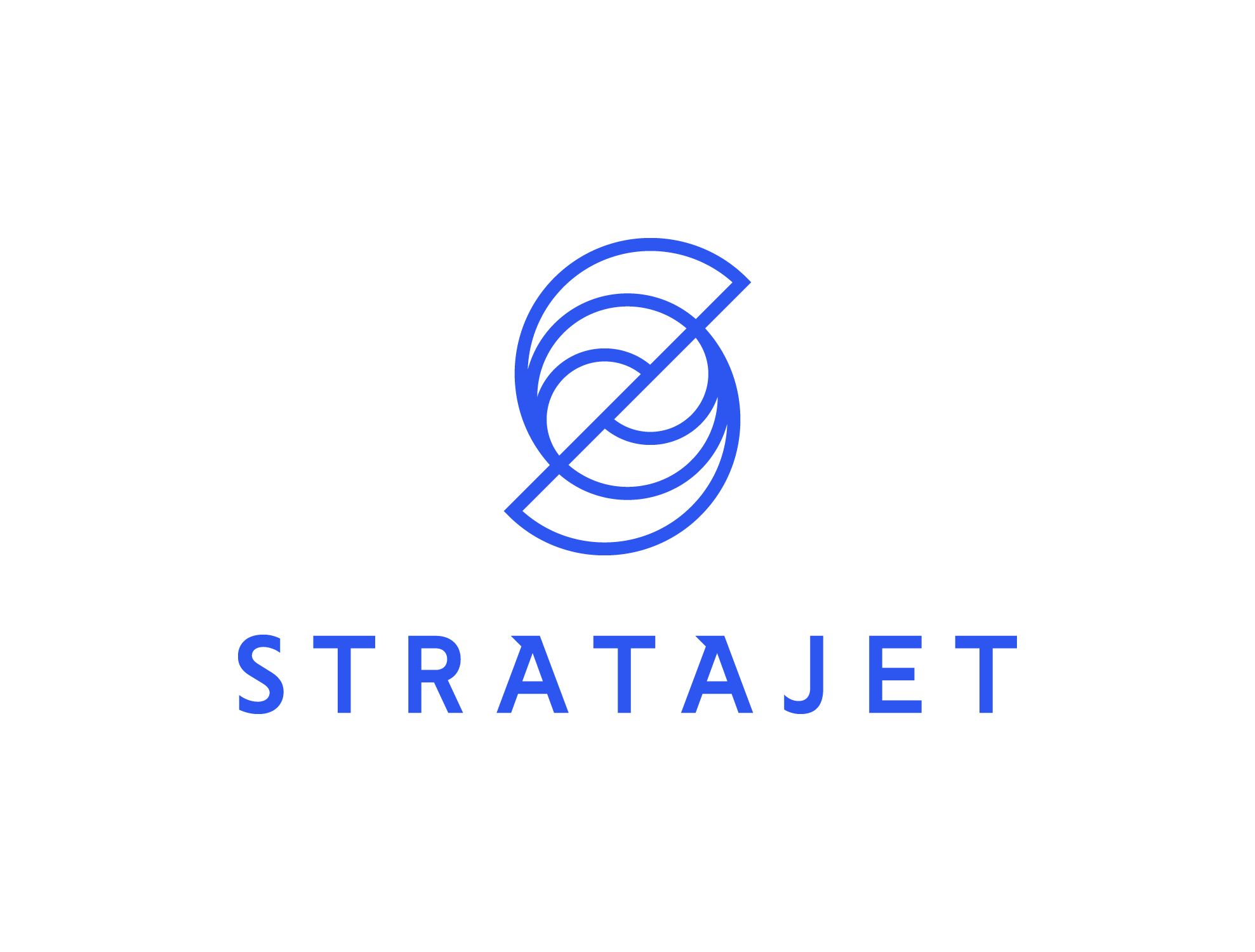
- Company type: Privately held company
- Industry: Aviation
- Founded: 2011
- Founder: Jonathan Nicol
- Headquarters: London, England
- Key people: Jonathan Nicol, Founder & CEO
- Number of employees: 50
- Parent: Oxis Aviation Ltd
- Website: www.stratajet.com

Stratajet is an online private jet booking company, servicing 44 countries in Europe and the United States.

The company was owned by Oxis Aviation Ltd. Its headquarters are in Faringdon in London with an office in Sacramento, California. It is a member of aviation industry bodies BACA and EBAA.

== History ==
Stratajet launched in April 2016 via Stratajet.com and an iOS app. It offers firm-bookable fares for private jets, rather than quotes or estimates.

The company was founded in 2011 by former military officer and pilot Jonathan Nicol. It took him five years to develop the technology needed to calculate the cost of a private jet without manual input.

Stratajet partners with international aircraft operators, including Centreline, ASL JetNetherlands, and Fixed Base Operators such as Jetex Flight Support and TAG Aviation to deliver its services to customers.

In May 2016, Stratajet received an $8 million round of funding, led by Octopus Ventures.

In May 2017, Stratajet won The Sapphire Pegasus Award in the “Aircraft Broker” category.

In May 2017, Stratajet was included in "The Leap 100 2017", an annual list published in City A.M., identifying the UK's most exciting and fastest growing companies.

Stratajet ranked fifth in the "Deloitte Tech Fast 50 2017" (an acknowledgement of the 50 fastest-growing technology companies in the UK), with a growth rate of 3,634% over four years. In April 2018, the company ranked 22nd in The FT 1000, a list published by the Financial Times that ranks Europe's fastest-growing companies.
