= Octopus Energy =

Energy supplier in the United Kingdom

Octopus Energy Group Limited
- Formerly: Octopus Energy Limited (5 August 2015–10 August 2015); Octopus Energy Holdings Limited (10 August 2015–20 October 2020)
- Type: Subsidiary
- Industry: Energy retailing
- Founded: August 5, 2015; 11 years ago in London, England
- Founder: Octopus Group
- Headquarters: London, England
- Areas served: Worldwide
- Key people: Greg Jackson (CEO); Stuart Jackson (CFO); James Eddison (CTO); Zoisa North-Bond (CEO of Octopus Generation)
- Products: Gas; Hydrogen; Electricity; Electric vehicle services; Heat pumps
- Revenue: £13.7 billion (2025); £13 billion (2023); £4.224 billion (2022); £1.24 billion (2020); £459 million (2019); £129 million (2018); £35 million (2017)
- Operating income: £195 million (2024)
- Net income: £255 million loss (2025)
- Total assets: £1.5 billion (2025)
- Total equity: £472.7 million (2022)
- Owner: Octopus Group (100%)
- Members: 11 million (2025); 7.95 million (2023)
- Number of employees: 11,000 (2025)
- Parent: Octopus Group
- Website: www.octopusenergy.group

Octopus Energy Group Limited (formerly Octopus Energy Limited and Octopus Energy Holdings Limited), known as Octopus Energy, is a British company operating in the fields of energy generation and supply.

It was founded in 2015 with the backing of Octopus Group, a British asset management company.

Headquartered in London, it has operations in the United Kingdom, France, Germany, Italy, Spain, Australia, Japan, New Zealand and the United States.

Octopus Energy is the UK's largest supplier of energy, with 14 million customer accounts in 8 million households as of 2026.

Octopus Energy Group operates a range of business divisions including Octopus Energy Retail, Octopus Energy for Business, Octopus Energy Services, Octopus Electric Vehicles, Octopus Energy Generation, Octopus Heating, and Kraken Technologies, and supports the not-for-profit think-tank Centre for Net Zero. The group also supplies software services to other energy suppliers.

== History ==
Octopus Energy Limited was formally incorporated on 14 October 2014 as Mercury Energy Supply Limited. Following its renaming in August 2015, the company commenced operations in November 2015 and began supplying energy to customers in December 2015. Greg Jackson is the founder of the company and holds the position of chief executive.

By April 2018, the company had 198,000 customers and had made an energy procurement deal with Shell. Later in 2018, Octopus gained the 100,000 customers of Iresa, under Ofgem's "supplier of last resort" process, after Iresa ceased trading. The same year, Octopus replaced SSE as the energy supplier for M&S Energy, a brand of Marks & Spencer, and bought Affect Energy, which had 22,000 customers.

In 2018 Hanwha Energy Retail Australia (Nectr) chose the Kraken platform, developed by Octopus to provide billing, CRM and other technology services to support its launch into the Australian retail energy market.

In August 2019, an agreement with Midcounties Co-operative saw Octopus gain more than 300,000 customers, taking its total beyond 1 million. Three Co-op brands were affected: Octopus acquired the customers of the GB Energy and Flow Energy brands, and began to operate the accounts of Co-op Energy customers on a white label basis, while Midcounties retained responsibility for acquiring new Co-op Energy customers.

In January 2020, ENGIE UK announced that it was selling its residential energy supply business (comprising around 70,000 UK residential customers) to Octopus. In the same month London Power was launched, a partnership with the Mayor of London.

In 2020, Octopus completed two funding rounds totalling $577 million, making the company the highest funded UK tech start-up that year. In November 2020, Octopus acquired Manchester-based smart grid energy software company Upside Energy, which in June 2021 rebranded as KrakenFlex. In the same month Octopus launched the not-for-profit Octopus Centre for Net Zero (OCNZ), a research organisation tasked with creating models and policy recommendations for potential paths to a green energy future.

In February 2021, CEO Greg Jackson said on a BBC News interview that Octopus does not operate a human resources department. In March 2021 the Financial Times listed Octopus at number 23 on their list of the fastest growing companies in Europe. In July 2021, Octopus rose 12 places on the UK Customer Service Index to 17th, making it the only energy company in the Top 50.

Also in 2021, Octopus built the UK's first R&D and training centre for the decarbonisation of heat. Located in Slough, the centre will train 1000 heat pump engineers per year and develop new heating systems.

In September 2021, Octopus was appointed as the Supplier of Last Resort (SOLR) for Avro Energy, acquiring Avro Energy's domestic customers and increasing their customer base to 3.1 million customers.

In November 2021, Octopus announced in Manchester that it had signed a deal with the city region as part of a bid to become carbon neutral by 2038.

In December 2022, Octopus Energy acquired UK-based Zestec Renewable Energy.

In October 2022, Octopus reached an agreement with the UK Government to acquire Bulb Energy's 1.5 million customers, at a time of high volatility in energy costs. The government provided funding to allow Octopus to procure energy for ex-Bulb customers for that winter. In July 2024, Octopus was expected to repay the government £2.8 billion, comprising £1.6bn drawn from that funding and £1.2bn profit from falling energy costs.

In February 2023, Marks & Spencer announced it was pulling out of the energy supply business and ending its five-year partnership with Octopus; the 60,000 M&S Energy customers would transfer to Octopus Energy in April.

In September 2023, Octopus announced it would be acquiring Shell's household energy business in the UK (trading as Shell Energy) and in Germany, in a deal expected to complete in late 2023 which would increase the company's domestic and business customer base to 6.5 million. In April 2024, Ofgem reported that Octopus had become the UK's largest electricity supplier by domestic customer numbers, with a 22% share, and that Octopus had a similar share of domestic gas customers, ranking second behind British Gas. By the end of that year, Octopus, having gained almost 1 million new gas and electricity accounts, had become Britain's largest household energy supplier, with 12.9 million domestic customer accounts in 7.3 million households (a 23.7% market share) – overtaking British Gas for the first time since its privatisation.

Octopus Energy acquired a 50% stake in Lintas Green Energy in March 2024. In September 2024, Octopus Energy acquired 100% of solar and battery storage developer Exagen Group. Octopus had already taken a 24% stake in the company in August 2022.

In September 2025, Octopus Energy partnered with LG to enable the hardware manufacturer's heat pumps and air conditioning units to integrate with the Kraken software platform; and also with Ming Yang Smart Energy to co-operate on wind projects in the UK.

In January 2026, Octopus was named as "Recommended Provider" by the Which? consumer organisation for the ninth successive year.

=== Financial history ===
In September 2019, Octopus acquired German start-up 4hundred for £15 million; the acquisition of 4hundred, which had 11,000 customers, was Octopus' first overseas expansion.

In May 2020, Australian electricity and gas supplier Origin Energy paid A$507 million for a 20% stake in Octopus. This meant Octopus gained "unicorn" status, as a startup company with a value in excess of £1 billion. In September of that year, Octopus acquired Evolve Energy, a US Silicon Valley–based start-up, in a US$5 million deal. The acquisition was the first step in Octopus' $US100 million US expansion; at the time of the acquisition, Octopus announced it was aiming to acquire 25 million US customers, and 100 million global customers in total, by 2027.

In December 2020, Tokyo Gas paid about 20 billion yen ($US193 million) for a 9.7% stake in Octopus, valuing the company at $US2.1 billion. Octopus and Tokyo Gas agreed to launch the Octopus brand in Japan via a 30:70 joint venture to provide electricity from renewable sources, amongst other services. Origin invested a further $US50 million at the same time, to maintain its 20% stake.

In August 2021, Octopus entered the Spanish market with the acquisition of green energy start-up Umeme. Upon the acquisition, Octopus announced it was targeting a million Spanish energy accounts under its brand by 2027. In November 2021, Octopus acquired Italian energy retailer SATO Luce e Gas, rebranding the business as Octopus Energy Italy, investing an initial £51 million and targeting 5% of the Italian market by 2025. As a result of these acquisitions, Octopus now has retail, generation or technology licences in 13 countries across four continents.

In September 2021, Generation Investment Management, co-founded and chaired by Al Gore, purchased a 13% stake in Octopus Energy Group in a deal worth $US600 million. The investment increased the company's valuation to $US4.6 billion, with the cash injection to be used by Octopus to increase its investment in new technologies for cheaper and faster decarbonisation.

In December 2021, Octopus Energy announced a long-term partnership with Canada Pension Plan Investment Board, raising US$300 million and taking the valuation of Octopus Energy Group to approximately $US5 billion.

In January 2022, Octopus Energy entered the French market with the acquisition of Plüm énergie, a French energy start-up with 100,000 retail and corporate accounts. Plüm was subsequently rebranded as Octopus Energy France.

Further funding of $800m from existing shareholders in December 2023 brought the valuation of Octopus Energy to nearly $US8 billion.

In January 2024, investments were made by impact managers Lightrock and Galvanise, alongside additional funding from existing investors Generation Investment Management and Canada Pension Plan Investment Board, bringing the valuation of Octopus Energy to $US9 billion.

== Operations ==
=== Gas and electricity supply ===
As of March 2023 the company has nearly 3 million domestic and business customers.

Besides industry-standard fixed and variable tariffs, the company is known for innovative tariffs which are made possible by the national rollout of smart meters. These include:

- Octopus Tracker – gas and electricity prices change every day, and are based on wholesale prices for that day, with disclosure of overheads and the company's profit margin.
- Octopus Agile – electricity prices change every half hour, according to a schedule published the previous day, determined from wholesale prices. The price occasionally goes negative (i.e. customers are paid to use electricity) at times of high generation and low demand.
- Octopus Go – a tariff with a reduced rate for an overnight period, intended for owners of electric vehicles.

In March 2019, Octopus announced it had partnered with Amazon's Alexa virtual assistant, to optimise home energy use through the Agile Octopus time-of-use tariff.

As part of their partnership agreed in August 2019, Midcounties Co-operative and Octopus established a joint venture to develop the UK's community energy market and encourage small-scale electricity generation.

==== Brands ====
Besides the Octopus Energy brand, as of April 2025 customers are supplied under the Co-op Energy and London Power brands.

=== Electricity generation ===
In its early years the company did not generate gas or electricity, instead making purchases on the wholesale markets. In 2019, Octopus stated that all its electricity came from renewable sources, and began to offer a "green" gas tariff with carbon offsetting. In July 2021, Octopus acquired sister company Octopus Renewables which claims to be the UK's largest investor in solar farms, and also invests in wind power and anaerobic digesters. At the time of the acquisition, the generation assets were reported to be worth over £3.4 billion.

In October 2020, Octopus partnered with Tesla Energy to power the Tesla Energy Plan, which is designed to power a home with 100% clean energy either from solar panels or Octopus. The plan allows households to become part of the UK Tesla Virtual Power Plant, which connects a network of homes that generate, store and return electricity to grid at peak times.

In January 2021, Octopus acquired two 73 metres (240 ft) wind turbines to power their 'Fan Club' tariff, which offers households living near its turbines cheaper electricity prices when the wind is blowing strongly. Customers on the tariff get a 20% discount on the unit price when the turbines are spinning, and a 50% discount when the wind is above 8 m/s (20 mph). In November 2021, Octopus Energy announced plans to raise £4 billion to fund the global expansion of its Fan Club model, which would be expanded to include solar farms. By 2030, Octopus aims to supply around 2.5 million households with green electricity through Fan Club schemes.

Also in November 2021, Octopus Energy Group signed a deal with Elia Group at COP26 to build a "smart" green grid across Belgium and Germany. The company's flexibility platform KrakenFlex will be used together with Elia Group's energy data affiliate, re.alto, to enable electric vehicles, heat pumps and other green technologies to be used for grid balancing.

In January 2022, it was announced that Octopus Renewables had bought the Broons/Biterne-Sud wind farm in Cotes d'Armor, northeast Brittany, France from Energiequelle for an undisclosed price. In June of that year, the group's fund management team bought the rights to develop the 35 MW Gaishecke wind farm near Frankfurt, Germany.

In September 2023, Octopus Energy acquired a 10% stake in a 731.5 MW wind farm located off the coast of Vlissingen. Octopus also took a 10% stake in the 714 MW East Anglia One wind farm in April 2025.

In September 2024, Octopus Energy acquired four solar projects from BayWa in Bristol, Essex, Wiltshire, and East Riding. They have a combined capacity of 222 megawatts.

=== Investment trust ===
Octopus Renewables is contracted as the investment manager for Octopus Renewables Infrastructure Trust, an investment trust established in 2019 which owns wind and solar generation in the UK, Europe and Australia.

=== Zero bills homes ===
Launched in 2022, Octopus’ ‘Zero Bills’ project offers an energy tariff at no cost for up to ten years in newly-built homes with technologies such as a heat pump, battery storage and solar panels. With partners including house-builders Vistry and Tilia, Octopus Energy stated aims are to deliver 100,000 ‘Zero Bills’ homes by 2030, with homes initially rolled out in Germany, New Zealand, and the UK.

=== Heat pumps ===
In 2022, Octopus Energy acquired heat pump manufacturer Renewable Energy Devices (RED) based in Craigavon, in Northern Ireland. The partnership planned to expand RED's existing factory to increase production and to incorporate its smart grid technology.

=== Electric vehicles ===
Octopus Group set up Octopus Electric Vehicles in 2021 as an electric vehicle (EV) leasing operation. By 2025, the company had become one of the UK’s leading providers, with a fleet of 27,000 cars (with a further 3,500 on order). Being part of an energy group, Octopus Electric Vehicles is able to offer integration of services and equipment - eg a home charger, smart meter, solar panels and heat pump, plus a cheap electricity tariff.

An electric vehicle charging platform, marketed as “Electroverse”, was launched in 2020, to simplify public charging of both domestic and fleet electric vehicles. The service integrated payments at over 1,000,000 chargers worldwide, from 1200 different brands. Electroverse teamed up with digital payment firm Visa, to encourage further facilities to business fleets. All drivers can use the service, and Octopus Energy customers have the option of paying their charging costs through their domestic energy bills. A similar “Octopus Charge” cross-network payment system was launched in North America in August 2026.

Octopus Energy and Chinese electric vehicle manufacturer BYD announced the UK’s first vehicle-to-grid (V2G) bundle.

== Marketing ==
=== Climate change ===
In 2019 Octopus launched a 'Portraits from the Precipice' campaign, which sought to raise awareness of climate change and encouraged customers to switch to greener energy deals. The campaign artwork was exhibited at over 5,000 sites, making it the largest ever digital out-of-home art exhibition. As a result of the campaign, Octopus registered a 163% increase in sign-ups and gained 37,000 customers. The campaign won the 2020 Marketing Week Masters award for utilities, and the 2020 Energy Institute award for Public Engagement.

=== Solar energy at COP26 ===
In November 2021 Octopus financed 'Grace of the Sun', a large-scale art piece by Robert Montgomery made using the Little Sun solar lamps designed by Olafur Eliasson and Frederik Ottesen. The project, which coincided with COP26, was realised in Glasgow through collaboration with the local art community, and was designed as a call for global leaders to invest in renewable energies such as solar PV, in order to power a sustainable future.

=== Octopus Energy Tech Summit 2025 ===
In June 2025, Octopus hosted the Energy Tech Summit in London, as part of London Climate Action Week. With 3000 attendees, global energy and technology leaders, the summit explored making clean power affordability, accessibility and its role in transition to sustainability.

== Kraken software ==
Octopus Energy licenses their proprietary customer management system called Kraken, which runs on Amazon's cloud computing service. It was first licensed by UK rival Good Energy in late 2019, for an initial three-year term, to manage its 300,000 customers.

In March 2020 it was announced that E.ON and its Npower subsidiary had licensed the technology to manage their combined 10 million customers. In May 2021 it was announced that E.ON had completed the migration of all two million former npower customers to its Kraken-powered E.ON Next customer service platform. The migration was hailed as being responsible for E.ON's financial recovery in the UK. The Kraken software was also licensed to Australia's Origin Energy as part of their May 2020 agreement.

In November 2021, EDF Energy agreed a deal with Octopus Energy Group to move its five million customers onto its Kraken platform. The customer accounts would be migrated onto Kraken from 2023, increasing the number of energy accounts contracted to be served via Kraken to over 20 million worldwide. Kraken also has strategic partnerships with Hanwha Group and Tokyo Gas.

In August 2024, Kraken announced the appointment of its own CEO, Amir Orad. TalkTalk, an internet service provider, began to use Kraken in 2025. It was reported in July 2025 that Octopus was considering a demerger of its Kraken Technologies business unit, which was speculated to have a £10bn valuation. In January 2025, it was reported that Kraken serviced 60 million customer accounts.

In December 2025, Octopus Energy said it would spin off Kraken Technologies at a valuation of $8.65 billion. The spinoff was expected to occur by the middle of 2026 and would see Octopus retain 14% ownership of Kraken.
