= SimplyCook =

Recipe box service in London

- Company type: Private
- Industry: Recipe box package delivery
- Founded: 2014 in London, United Kingdom
- Founder: Oliver Ashness
- Headquarters: London, United Kingdom
- Area served: United Kingdom
- Products: SimplyCook Recipe Kits
- Services: Recipe creation, delivery service
- Number of employees: 20 (2018)
- Website: https://www.simplycook.com/

SimplyCook is a subscription-based recipe box service based in London. The company provides a monthly box containing four recipes and four nonperishable ingredient kits that are then added to fresh ingredients the subscriber purchases from the supermarket. SimplyCook was founded by Oliver Ashness in 2014. SimplyCook's recipes have been featured in Woman’s World, Daily Express, and The Independent.

== History ==
In 2013, Ashness founded SimplyCook after observing how tedious it could be to try a new recipe. Ashness also noticed that a majority of people cooked the same dishes repeatedly and ingredients to experiment with new recipes were often expensive for one meal. He created SimplyCook to provide a solution to those wanting to have an alternative to other food delivery services.

Ashness tested his company idea in 2013 and launched SimplyCook in 2014 with £100,000 from his savings and friends and family. Within six months of its launch, SimplyCook had thousands of consumers.

In 2015, Episode 1 of Ventures, an investment company focused on early-stage software businesses, invested $1.1 million in SimplyCook.

In January 2019 the startup raised £4.5 million in Series A. The round was led by Octopus Investments.

== Operations ==
SimplyCook provides a subscription service that consists of four recipe cards and ingredients kits, which contain herbs, spices, sauces and other extras needed for the recipe. Each kit contains up to 18 ingredients paired with recipes developed by company chefs. The company develops new recipes solely by gathering data from the customers' online selections.
