= Institute of Telecommunications Professionals =

The ITP
- The Institute of Telecommunications Professionals
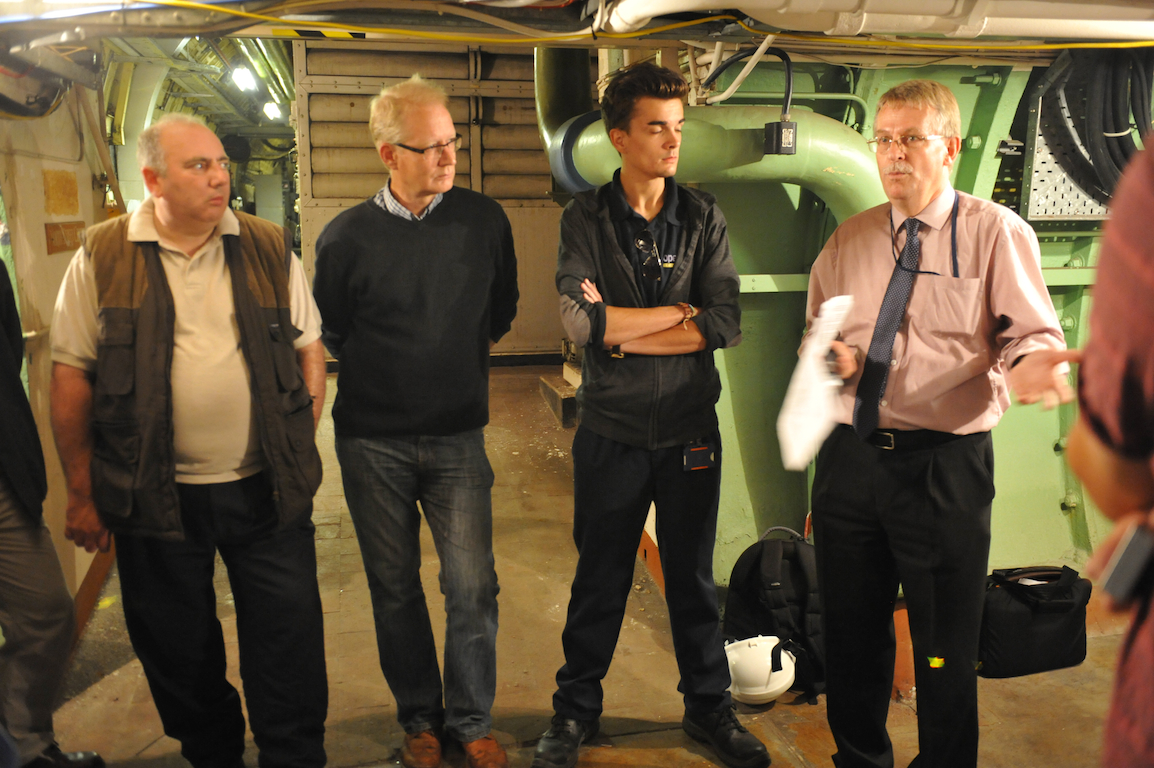
- An ITP guided tour of the Kingsway telephone exchange tunnels
- Established: 1906 (incorporated 20 May 2002; 24 years ago)
- Type: Nonprofit
- Registration no.: 04442329 (Company number)
- Legal status: Private company limited by guarantee without share capital
- Purpose: Professional membership organisation
- Headquarters: Sunbury Te, Green Street, Sunbury-on-Thames, Middlesex, TW16 6QJ
- Location: Sunbury-on-Thames, United Kingdom
- Coordinates: 51.41224°N 0.41773°W
- Region served: United Kingdom
- Services: Activities; publications
- Field: Telecommunications
- Official language: English
- Chairman: Tim Creswick
- Publication: Journal of the Institute of Telecommunications Professionals
- Website: theitp.org

The Institute of Telecommunications Professionals (ITP) is a membership organisation for professionals in the telecommunications industry, based in the United Kingdom.

The Institute was originally founded in 1906. It is now a registered company with Companies House in the United Kingdom, incorporated in 2002. Brendan O' Mahony has been the chief executive of the ITP.

Lucy Woods presided over ITP for fifteen years, until 2018, when the organization named Kevin Paige chairman for five years.

In 2022 the ITP appointed its new CEO, Charlotte Goodwill.

In 2021, the ITP assisted a UK fibre network Vorboss in establishing its training academy. In 2023, the ITP appointed Tim Creswick, the CEO of Vorboss, as the new chair of its board of directors.

The institute has an associated journal, the Journal of the Institute of Telecommunications Professionals, established in 2007 and published quarterly.

== See also ==
- Telecommunications in the United Kingdom
- Internet in the United Kingdom
