= Chris Norbury (businessman) =

British businessman

Christopher Stephen Norbury (born 1974) is a British businessman, and the chief executive officer (CEO) of E.ON UK, one of the UK's six largest suppliers, since June 2023.

Norbury, who was E.ON UK's chief people officer, succeeded Michael Lewis as CEO on 1 June 2023, after Lewis became CEO of Uniper in Germany.

In September 2023, he criticised Rishi Sunak's abandonment of net-zero pledges, calling it a "misstep on many levels".
