= People Against Wylfa-B =

Welsh campaign group

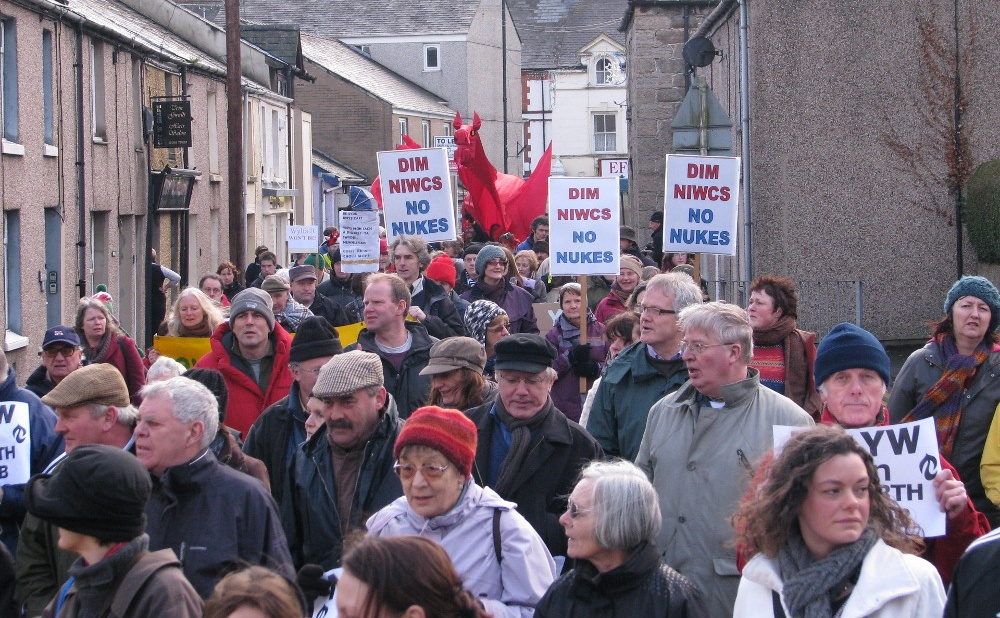
Protest organised by PAWB in Llangefni, January 2012 to support the Jones family of, Caerdegog Farm who refused to sell their land for the construction of a new nuclear power plant

People Against Wylfa-B (PAWB, Welsh: Pobl Atal Wylfa-B) is a campaign group established in 1988 to oppose the construction of a second nuclear power plant at Wylfa on the north coast of the island of Anglesey, Wales.

"Pawb" is Welsh for "everybody".

The group's main objection to nuclear power are due to doubts over safety and concerns regarding the disposal of radioactive waste. PAWB also contend that nuclear power plants are vastly expensive and that cheaper, more environmentally friendly alternatives exist for electricity production.

Much of the debate around a new nuclear power plant at Wylfa has centred upon the need for job creation on Anglesey.

PAWB argued that little economic advantage has been gained from the original Wylfa Nuclear Power plant opened in 1971. Anglesey having the weakest GVA economic indicator figures in the United Kingdom.

== Wylfa Nuclear Power Station ==
The first Wylfa Nuclear Power Station was constructed in the 1960s and opened in 1971, producing electricity until its closure in 2010.

== Wylfa-B and establishing PAWB ==
In the 1980s the UK government proposed a second generation of nuclear power stations and Wylfa was to be considered as a possible site. PAWB were established to campaign against the plans for the new plant - referred to as "Wylfa-B"

Following the 1986 Chernobyl nuclear disaster the UK government's plans were shelved. For many years after the Chernobyl disaster nuclear power was off the policy agenda in most countries and like many anti-nuclear groups world-wide, PAWB disbanded.

== Re-establishing PAWB ==
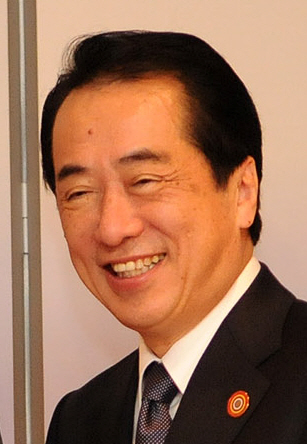
Naoto Kan, former Prime Minister of Japan

In the early 2000s, under the leadership of Tony Blair, the UK government again proposed a second generation of nuclear power plants and the British government announced that Wylfa was one of the sites it considered suitable. PAWB was re-established.

In 2009 Horizon Nuclear Power (originally an E.ON and RWE joint venture, bought by Hitachi in 2012) announced intentions build two advanced boiling water reactors (ABWRs) at a site to the south of the existing Wylfa station.

Amongst PAWB's activities to have been a protest demonstration in Llangefni in January 2012 to support the Jones family of Caerdegog Farm who refused to sell their land to Horizon for the construction of the new plant.

Following the Fukushima Daiichi nuclear disaster in 2011 PAWB established contacts with anti-nuclear campaigners in Japan. In 2015, at PAWB's invitation, Naoto Kan the prime minister of Japan at the time of the Fukushima disaster, visited Anglesey to plead for further nuclear power developments to be stopped.

PAWB have consistently voiced doubts over the financial viability of the proposed Wylfa. In January 2019 Hitachi announced that they were unable to attract sufficient investment and were suspending their involvement in the Horizon Wylfa project.
