= London Power =

Energy company in the UK operated by the Mayor of London

- Industry: Electricity and gas supply
- Founded: 2019
- Headquarters: London
- Area served: London
- Key people: Mayor of London
- Parent: Greater London Authority
- Website: mylondonpower.com

London Power is an electricity and gas supply company in the United Kingdom, launched in 2019 by Sadiq Khan, Mayor of London.

== Establishment ==
The company was established in July 2019and began trading in January 2020. It is a wholly owned subsidiary of the Greater London Authority (GLA).

== Functioning ==
London Power only accepts customers at London addresses.

Octopus Energy supplies gas, 100% renewable electricity and customer service on behalf of London Power. The GLA states that any profits will be invested into delivering the Mayor's social and environmental goals. The GLA receives a commission from Octopus to London Power for the customers.

Profits made by the GLA are reinvested into community projects.

== Reception ==
The Green member of the London Assembly, Caroline Russell, criticised London Power for being set up with the help of Octopus Energy, a private company, rather than being completely within the responsibility of the GLA. The Renewables Energy Agency supported the body, describing the GLA as being a pioneer.
