= Moorside clean energy hub =

Proposed British energy infrastructure

- Country: United Kingdom
- Location: Sellafield, Cumbria
- Coordinates: 54.429566°N 3.510911°W
- Status: Proposed
- Owner: Nuclear Decommissioning Authority

Nuclear power station
- Reactor type: PWR (EPR) and SMR or AMR modular reactors

Power generation
- Units planned: 2

Moorside clean energy hub was a proposal put forward on 30 June 2020 by two consortia, one led by EDF and the other by Rolls-Royce, to create an energy hub that would produce electricity and hydrogen through the use of nuclear power and renewable energy.

The hub would have been constructed on the cancelled Moorside nuclear power station site, near Sellafield in Cumbria, which was abandoned by Toshiba in 2018.

== History ==
In 2020, EDF Energy put forward plans to build two EPR units, replicating Hinkley Point C and Sizewell C, for a total capacity of 3.2 GWe. In parallel, a Rolls-Royce-led UK SMR consortium announced plans for a low-carbon power station around a small, light-water reactor Rolls-Royce SMR linked with renewable energy generation, hydrogen production and battery storage technologies. The Nuclear Industry Association welcomed the proposal for the Moorside site, with the CEO adding, "These are exactly the attributes the country needs to bounce back from COVID-19, deliver jobs, and get us on track to hit Net Zero. Large scale and smaller, next generation technologies have a huge amount to offer working as part of the clean energy hub concept. They can deliver clean electricity and achieve deeper decarbonisation through the creation of hydrogen, clean fuels and district and industrial heating."

On 11 November 2020, the BBC reported that Rolls-Royce has plans to construct up to 16 SMR's in the UK, with a capacity of 440 MW each. In 2019, the company received £18 million to begin designing the modular system, and the BBC claims that the government will provide an additional £200 million for the project as a part of its green plan for economic recovery. Rolls-Royce claims that the project will create 6000 jobs in the midlands and the north over the next 5 years and that the technology will also provide export technologies.

In July 2023, leader of Cumberland Council, Mark Fryer, urged the Minister for Nuclear and Networks Andrew Bowie and the Nuclear Decommissioning Authority to progress the project. In February 2024, Fryer expressed his disappointment that an alternative to the failed EPR reactor proposal, a development to build small modular reactors, would be progressed in Teesside rather than in Cumberland.

== Proposals ==
=== Low Carbon Electricity Generation ===
The consortium proposes the construction of 2 EPR reactors with an electrical output of 3200MW and a thermal output of 8000MW, as well as a number of small modular reactors and advanced modular reactors which would be able to generate low carbon electricity for the national grid, as well as thermal energy for use in the surrounding communities and other parts of the clean energy hub.

=== Green Hydrogen ===
The consortium has proposed that the hub uses High-temperature electrolysis, which uses heat to improve the efficiency of electrolysis to generate hydrogen. The consortium would utilise low cost energy during periods of high production or low demand to generate hydrogen, as well as waste heat from the power station. The consortium argues that the hydrogen would be able to be injected into the national gas grid to help lower the carbon intensity of it, and in future replace all of the natural gas in the grid. The hydrogen generated would also be able to be utilised in transportation as the consortium would be able to supply hydrogen for use in Heavy Goods Vehicles, Trains, Buses and Shipping.

=== Energy Storage ===
As a part of the consortiums proposals, electricity would be able to be stored on site. Electricity would be able to be stored using cryogenic energy storage systems where a 4 stage process would be used, which would allow for rapid responses to changes in electricity demand.

1. Charge Stage

The input air is refrigerated until it becomes liquid by a series of compression and cooling stages (powered by electricity). This stage produces waste heat. This heat can be used in other clean energy hub processes including to enhance the efficiency of hydrogen production.

2. Storage Stage

The liquified air is stored in low pressure tanks.

3. Discharge Stage

When electricity is needed, the liquified air is heated (by waste heat from Moorside) and expanded. The resultant high pressure gas is used to turn turbines producing electricity.

4. Cold Store

The discharge stage produces waste cold (from the liquified air). This is captured and stored to be used in the cooling of the charge stage. This improves the efficiency of the process. This cold store could also be used to assist other processes in the clean energy hub such as providing emergency cooling for the data centre.

Another method that has been proposed is the use of electricity to create hot and cold temperature stores. The temperature difference is used to then rotate a generator and produce power when required. Additional electricity storage can be added at low cost by increasing the heat storage capacity.

== See also ==
- Proposed nuclear power stations in the United Kingdom
- Moorside nuclear power station
- Nuclear power in the United Kingdom
- Hinkley Point C nuclear power station
- Sizewell C nuclear power station
