= Kraken Technologies =

British energy technology platform

- Type: Private
- Industry: Energy technology
- Founded: 2017
- Area served: Worldwide
- Key people: Gavin Patterson (chairman); Amir Orad (CEO); James Eddison (CTO)
- Revenue: £136.3 million (2024)
- Number of employees: 2,000
- Parent: Octopus Energy
- Website: kraken.tech

Kraken Technologies is a British energy technology company developed and owned by Octopus Energy Group.

The platform is licensed by 40 utilities in 27 countries, including energy suppliers and non-energy utilities such as water, offshore wind, and telecommunications. Octopus Energy is Britain’s largest domestic energy supplier, and as of 2025 Kraken handles its 12.9 million accounts for supply of gas and electricity to 7.3 million UK households. In 2025, Kraken was contracted to manage over 70 million accounts, in 27 countries worldwide.

== History ==
Octopus Energy introduced Kraken Technologies in 2017. The platform was developed to introduce efficiencies across customer needs and operational fulfilment.

The platform increased international adoption in 2018 when Hanwha Energy Retail Australia (Nectr) utilized Kraken for billing and customer relationship management (CRM) services as it entered the Australian market.

In October 2019, Good Energy licensed Kraken to manage its 300,000 customers for an initial three-year term. The following year, E.ON and its subsidiary Npower licensed Kraken to manage their combined customer base of 10 million. E.ON later transitioned two million former Npower customers to the Kraken-powered E.ON Next platform. In May 2020, Origin Energy acquired a 20% stake in Octopus Energy, obtaining rights to use the Kraken platform in Australia.

2021, Kraken Technologies was contracted by EDF Energy to transition its five million customers to the Kraken platform.

Kraken announced further international partnerships with Plenitude (Eni) on 9 May 2023, serving approximately two million customers, and operating in France, Greece, Portugal, Slovenia and Spain.

In 2024, Kraken was licensed by the North American utility Saint John Energy, and partnered with German energy supplier Maingau Energie.

In September 2025 it was announced that Octopus was planning a demerger of its Kraken Technologies business unit, which was speculated to have a £10bn valuation.

In December 2025, Octopus sold a minority stake in Kraken for $1 billion, which valued the company at $8.65 billion. The sale was reported to be the first step in a full demerger of the company.

=== Non-energy utilities ===
Kraken also expanded into the water and broadband/telecom utility sectors. In July 2023, it signed partnerships with Cuckoo, the broadband provider (July 2023) and Portsmouth Water. In October 2023 it signed an initial partnership with water utility Severn Trent Ltd, in which the platform was used to source 100% renewable energy to power operations, and to transition its vehicle fleet to be entirely electric by 2030. In November 2024, Kraken announced further adoption by English water company Severn Trent to license the technology platform to enhance services for its 4.6 million customers. TalkTalk became the first major UK ISP to adopt the Kraken platform in February 2024.

== Organisation ==
Gavin Patterson was appointed chairman of Kraken Technologies in November 2023, and Amir Orad was appointed the first dedicated CEO in July 2024.

Kraken Technologies reported revenues of £136.3 million in FY2024 and total recurring revenue of £89.6 million, a 68% gain from FY2023. As of November 2025, Kraken had £380 million contracted annual recurring revenue and was contracted to manage 75 million customers.

== Market position and analysis ==
In December 2024 The Globe and Mail reported that Kraken's licensing business served 66 million customers. Octopus chief executive Greg Jackson told the newspaper that clients who license Kraken had replaced between 15 and 200 different software systems. Canary Media reported in 2023 that, according to the company, Kraken handled utility interactions for 45% of UK households, and listed E.ON and EDF among its adopters. Nikkei Business reported that Kraken's licence sales in the year to April 2021 were about £69 million. Origin Energy said in 2020 that it would move 3.8 million retail electricity and gas customer accounts to Kraken.

In a July 2025 article the platform was mentioned to have for 6.5 million customers in New York and Massachusetts.

== Controversies ==
=== Conflicts of interest and corporate structure ===
Kraken Technologies licenses its software platform to competing energy suppliers including EDF, E.ON, and National Grid in the US, while remaining wholly owned by Octopus Energy — itself a direct competitor to many of those clients. This arrangement raised concerns among industry observers about whether Kraken's clients could be confident that commercially sensitive data would remain ring-fenced from its parent company's retail operations.

In September 2025, Octopus Energy announced plans to spin off Kraken into an independent company, a move that the company said would address such concerns. Martin Young, founder of consulting firm Aquaicity, noted that the separation would "put to bed the question: 'Is Octopus a supplier with a tech arm attached, or a tech company that has a supplier as a shop window?'" Kraken CEO Amir Orad described the move as "strategic and inevitable". According to Sky News, Goldman Sachs was hired to advise on the demerger, which could value Kraken at up to £10 billion.

=== Government investment and political connections ===
In January 2026, the British Business Bank made its largest-ever direct investment - £25 million of taxpayer money - in Kraken Technologies, despite the company already being valued at $8.65 billion. Shadow business secretary Andrew Griffith questioned the rationale: "If there is a good use for taxpayers' money, it is to help the least well connected scale-ups, not those already in and out of Downing Street."

Octopus founder Greg Jackson had been appointed to the Cabinet Office board months earlier and had appeared alongside energy secretary Ed Miliband, who publicly called him "my friend". Business secretary Peter Kyle denied the investment was "a bung".

=== Regulatory capital shortfall ===
After Ofgem introduced financial resilience rules in April 2025 requiring suppliers to hold £115 in adjusted net assets per customer, Octopus Energy - Kraken's parent company and largest client - was among the suppliers that failed to comply. Centrica CEO Chris O'Shea publicly called for Octopus to be banned from acquiring new customers, claiming the shortfall exceeded £1 billion and accusing Ofgem of "criminal" double standards in enforcement. Octopus had posted a £260 million loss in the year to April 2025, and £600 million of intangible assets on its books - including the value attributed to Kraken - did not count towards regulatory capital. Commentators noted that the subsequent Kraken spin-off, in which Octopus retained only 13.7% of the business, served to plug this capital gap.
