= NuGeneration =

NuGeneration Limited
- Industry: Nuclear power
- Founded: 2009
- Defunct: 23 December 2021
- Fate: Liquidation
- Headquarters: Manchester, UK
- Products: Electricity
- Owner: Toshiba
- Website: www.nugeneration.com

NuGeneration (NuGen) was a company that planned to build a new nuclear power station nearby the Sellafield nuclear site in the United Kingdom. The proposed site was called Moorside, and is to the north and west of Sellafield. On 8 November 2018, Toshiba announced their withdrawal from the project and intent to liquidate NuGen.

== History ==
NuGen was established in February 2009 as a joint venture between ENGIE (formerly GDF Suez), Iberdrola and Scottish and Southern Energy (SSE). The initial holdings in NuGen were ENGIE and Iberdrola each with 37.5% and SSE with 25%.

The company had announced plans to build a new nuclear power station of up to 3.6GW capacity adjacent to the Sellafield complex in North West England. In October 2009, it purchased an option to acquire land around Sellafield from the Nuclear Decommissioning Authority for £70 million. The company planned to make a final investment decision in 2015 with a view to starting production in 2023. When it began, NuGen evaluated building either two Areva 1,650 MWe EPR or three Westinghouse 1,100 MWe AP1000 reactors.

In September 2011, SSE announced that it had left the consortium, with ENGIE and Iberdrola buying SSE out to increase their stakes to 50% each.

=== Westinghouse ownership ===
In December 2013, Toshiba, through its Westinghouse subsidiary, agreed to pay £85 million for Iberdrola's 50% share of NuGen. Toshiba also intends to purchase part of ENGIE's stake, giving it 60% ownership. The change in ownership will cause the chosen new build reactor to the Westinghouse 1,100 MWe AP1000, with a target first operation date of 2024.

In June 2014, Toshiba and ENGIE announced plans for three AP1000s at Moorside at a cost of at least £10 billion. The build was planned to start in 2020, with a target of having the first reactor operating in 2024. Sandy Rupprecht, who had headed development of the Westinghouse AP1000 reactor, would be the new chief executive of NuGen. The final investment decision was due for 2018.

In 2015, NuGen re-located its headquarters to Manchester. In July 2015, NuGen purchased the land near Sellafield it had an option on, approximately 200 hectares, for an undisclosed sum.

The AP1000 design requires Office for Nuclear Regulation (ONR) Generic Design Assessment, which was initially planned to finish in March 2017. However, as of November 2016 the ONR noted there was a "very large amount of assessment to complete with issues still emerging". Slippage of the completion date is likely.

In February 2017 the Japanese newspaper Asahi Shimbun reported that Toshiba, following financial difficulties in 2016, wished to sell its shares in Westinghouse and NuGen over the next few years, although Toshiba stated to remain committed to the project. Korea Electric Power Corporation, who build the APR-1400 reactor, expressed an interest in purchasing Toshiba’s 60% share of NuGen, subject to suitable sale conditions.

On 29 March 2017 Toshiba placed Westinghouse in Chapter 11 bankruptcy because of $9 billion of losses from its nuclear reactor construction projects, mostly the construction of four AP1000 reactors in the United States. Following on from this, on 4 April 2017, ENGIE exercised its contractual right to sell its 40% stake in NuGen to Toshiba for $138 million, leaving Toshiba as sole owner. A strategic review of the Moorside project is being conducted, including discussions about the involvement of South Korean government backed Korea Electric Power Corporation.

=== Proposed Kepco ownership ===
In December 2017 Korea Electric Power Corporation (Kepco) was announced as the preferred bidder to acquire NuGen, with a target date for the purchase of early 2018. Kepco would aim to build APR-1400 reactors, which would require an Office for Nuclear Regulation Generic Design Assessment.

In July 2018 Kepco’s preferred bidder status was terminated, and in September 2018 NuGen announced that it would reduce staffing by 60% with remaining staff focusing on the sale of the project.

=== Liquidation ===
On 8 November 2018, Toshiba announced they had withdrawn from the project and had liquidated NuGen.

NuGen was dissolved on 23 December 2021.

== See also ==
- Economics of new nuclear power plants
- Nuclear power in the United Kingdom
- Energy use and conservation in the United Kingdom
