= David Hillier (academic) =

David Hillier is Associate Principal at the University of Strathclyde and Executive Dean of the Strathclyde Business School, having previously held the Ziff Chair in Financial Markets at Leeds University Business School, University of Leeds. He has taught financial and accounting topics in a number of academic institutions in Greece, Italy, Malaysia, the Netherlands, Spain, Tanzania, Thailand and others. Professor David Hillier is an author of several books and other publications in the field of finance, corporate governance and accounting, including "Fundamentals of Corporate Finance: European Edition".

== Academic career ==
Hillier was appointed to the Ziff Chair in Financial Markets at the University of Leeds in 2004. He moved to the Accounting and Finance Department in the University of Strathclyde in September 2010. His research papers have attracted an ANBAR citation and best paper prizes and he has been ranked in the top 3% most prolific finance researchers in the world over the period 1958 - 2008. He is also on the editorial board of Accounting and Finance, Accounting Research Journal, Finance Letters, Journal of Business Finance and Accounting, Review of Behavioral Finance, and African Journal of Finance and Management. Previously, Professor Hillier has also reviewed for many journals, including the Journal of Banking and Finance, Financial Analysts Journal, Journal of Business Finance and Accounting, Journal of Corporate Finance, The Financial Review, Journal of Risk and Insurance, Journal of Management Studies, European Financial Management, and Journal of International Money and Finance.

Professor Hillier has conducted courses for a variety of professional clients, including The World Bank and the National Health Service. He was employed as a World Bank consultant in March 2004 to the Bank of Tanzania and his main role was to advise the institution on the use and supervision of financial derivatives in the local banking sector. He has also worked as a consultant for NHS Connecting for Health to advise on their internal corporate governance structures.

== Books ==
- Fundamentals of Corporate Finance: European Edition, by D. Hillier, I. Clacher, S. Ross, R. Westerfield, J. Jaffe, and B. Jordan. McGraw-Hill, 4th Edition, 2020. ISBN 978-1526848086
- Corporate Finance: European Edition, by D. Hillier, S. Ross, R. Westerfield, J. Jaffe, and B. Jordan. McGraw-Hill, 3rd Edition, 2016.
- Financial Markets and Corporate Strategy: European Edition, by D. Hillier, M. Grinblatt, and S. Titman. McGraw-Hill, 2nd Edition, 2011.
