= Vorboss =

British telecommunications company

- Type: Private
- Industry: Telecommunications, ISP, wired communication
- Founded: 2006
- Headquarters: London, England, UK
- Area served: United Kingdom
- Key people: John Browett (Chairman); James Fredrickson (Chief Corporate Affairs Officer); David Gilbey(CFO); Rikshita Khela (CPO); Rhod Morgan (COO); Richard Price (CSO); Aaron Rice (CIO)
- AUM: ▲£2,100,000 (2020)
- Number of employees: 350 (2022)
- Parent: Fern Trading Group Ltd
- Website: vorboss.com

Vorboss is a company owned by Fern Trading Ltd, headquartered in Broadgate, London, England. The company provides communications infrastructure services, including fibre and bandwidth connectivity to business customers. It was established in 2006 by Tim Creswick.

== History ==
Vorboss was founded in 2006 by Tim Creswick as a software consultancy and managed service provider. In 2019, Ofcom lifted BT Group's Openreach infrastructure use constraints, allowing other network builders to deploy fiber lines in Openreach ducts for enterprise users.

In November 2020, Vorboss was acquired by Fern Trading Group (Fern Fibre Limited) for an undisclosed sum. Vorboss was added to Fern's portfolio of UK broadband network builders, securing £250m in funding for the London deployment.

From 2020 to 2023, Vorboss invested over £200 million in a full-fibre network to provide enterprises with fibre infrastructure. The company installed 500 km of fiber optic cables in Central London with 10 to 100 Gbit/s speeds. In 2021, Vorboss partnered with The Institute of Telecommunications Professionals (ITP) to launch a training academy.

In 2022, Vorboss established a 100 Gbit/s connection at London's 22 Bishopsgate skyscraper, one of the UK's tallest office buildings. The same year, it expanded its datacenters in Interxion's London headquarters and opened its new headquarters at Broadwalk House, Broadgate.

In 2023, Vorboss' CEO Tim Creswick became the chair of the ITP board of directors. The same year, the company hired Octopus Group Holdings board member John Browett as a new chairman, who also entered the board of Fern Trading Group.

== Operations ==
Vorboss offers business customers in London access to 10 Gbit/s dedicated fibre connectivity with the capacity to increase to 100 Gbit/s. The company has deployed 500 km of fibre-optic cables, connecting 1,500 subterranean "telecom chambers" to datacenters and customer locations in the duct network. There are no overground street cabinets and cable line power.

It partners with Juniper Networks for routing platforms and RAD for fiber termination CPE units.

Around 40% of Vorboss field technicians are female. The organisation is vertically integrated, owning its infrastructure, service and software systems end-to-end.

=== Electric Cargo Bicycle ===
In 2024, Vorboss developed an electric cargo bicycle with a secure cargo area and engineer workspace. The bike is equipped to splice fibre, adjusting the company's fleet operation to London's Clean Air Zone. The bike is pedal-powered and pavement-mountable, containing all equipment and instruments required for network servicing.
