= Duncan Hawthorne =

British businessman

Duncan Hawthorne is an international businessman in the electricity industry. He is the Chief Executive Officer of Horizon Nuclear Power. He holds an honours degree in control engineering from the Open University and an MBA from Strathclyde University in Glasgow.

Duncan has held various positions in the Electrical Generation Businesses in the United Kingdom and North America at South of Scotland Electricity Board, Scottish Nuclear, British Energy, AmerGen and Bruce Power from Apprentice level through Technician, Engineering and Managerial positions to Senior Executive level.

== Career ==
Duncan joined the power industry in Scotland with the South of Scotland Electricity Board as an apprentice at the Cumbernauld Training Centre, and spent time at some of the SSEB power stations. He held engineering and managerial posts at Hunterston B, which during this period was vested with Scottish Nuclear. Upon the formation of British Energy, he joined the head office organization in East Kilbride.

== North America and Bruce Power Formation ==
Duncan headed to North America as part of AmerGen, a joint venture which included British Energy, in Philadelphia. It was while in North America he joined Dr. Robin Jeffery (the deputy chairman of British Energy) in the formation of Canagen based in Toronto, as part of the British Energy organization to become part of the Canadian electricity setup. It was this that led to the formation of Bruce Power.

Duncan was part of the executive team throughout the Bruce Nuclear acquisition, the formation of Bruce Power and the development of the company's current partnership structure with the Cameco Corporation, TransCanada Corporation, BPC Generation Infrastructure Trust, a trust established by the Ontario Municipal Employees Retirement System, the Power Workers’ Union and The Society of Energy Professionals.

== Horizon Nuclear Power ==
He was a non-executive board member of Horizon Nuclear Power based in the UK.

However, in March 2016, it was announced that Duncan would take up the post of CEO as of the 1 May 2016.

== Awards and recognitions ==
Duncan has participated in Canadian and international organizations related to the electricity industry. He is Chair of the Canadian Nuclear Association (CNA), In 2013, Duncan was elected as the President of WANO (World Association of Nuclear Operators). He is a member of Canada Defense Science Advisory Board. He was elected a Fellow of the Royal Academy of Engineering in 2021.
