= Octopus Renewables Infrastructure Trust =

British investment trust

Octopus Renewables Infrastructure Trust (ORIT) is a British investment trust which invests in renewable electricity generation assets in countries in Europe and Australia. It floated on the London Stock Exchange in December 2019, raising £350m.

The chairman is Phil Austin. Its investment manager is Octopus Renewables Ltd, part of Octopus Group, who replaced Octopus Investments Ltd, also part of Octopus Group, in June 2021.

The company had net assets of £599 million at December 2023.

ORIT owns a 15.5% stake in the Lincs Wind Farm. In June 2022, the company acquired the Cambridgeshire-based Breach Solar Farm and, in August 2022, it acquired a 51% stake in the Crossdykes Onshore Wind Farm.
