= Moorside nuclear power station =

Proposed British nuclear power station

- Country: United Kingdom
- Location: Sellafield, Cumbria
- Coordinates: 54.4296°N 3.5109°W
- Status: cancelled
- Owner: NuGen

Nuclear power station
- Reactor type: PWR

External links
- Website: www.rolls-royce.com/~/media/Files/R/Rolls-Royce/documents/customers/nuclear/a-national-endeavour.pdf

Moorside nuclear power station was a proposed and subsequently cancelled to be built near Sellafield, in Cumbria, England. The original plan by NuGeneration, a British subsidiary of Toshiba-owned Westinghouse Electric Company, had the station coming online from 2024 with 3.4 GW of new nuclear capacity, from three AP1000 reactors. Work up to 2018 would include acquiring the site licence, the development consent order, and other required permits and permissions to start work. Site preparation was to take two years, up to 2020.

Following the Chapter 11 bankruptcy of Westinghouse in March 2017, the project was put under review. From December 2017 to July 2018 Kepco was named as preferred bidder. Kepco were thought to prefer their own APR-1400 reactor design for the site, a design which had not yet gone through generic design assessment with the UK's Office for Nuclear Regulation.

On 8 November 2018, it was announced that Toshiba's plans for the new nuclear power station had been scrapped and its subsidiary company, NuGen, would be wound up. The Moorside site was handed back to the Nuclear Decommissioning Authority, and the government issued a statement reaffirming its commitment to new nuclear.

In July 2020, a EDF-led Moorside consortium announced a proposal for two EPR reactors yielding 3,200 MW_{e} of new nuclear capacity. A second Rolls-Royce-led UK SMR consortium plans a low-carbon power station around a small light-water reactor and the possibility of a link with renewable technologies, storage systems and hydrogen production named Moorside clean energy hub.

== History ==
The option for a 190-hectare (470-acre) plot north of Sellafield was acquired in October 2009 for £70 million by a joint venture formed by Iberdrola, GdF-Suez, and Scottish & Southern, which named itself NuGeneration (NuGen) in November 2010. The future plant was named Moorside in December 2011. Toshiba, as owner of Westinghouse, took over Iberdrola's stake in NuGen in 2013, allowing the completion of the generic design assessment (GDA) for the AP1000 design by UK regulators. The GDA required a customer and specific site to finalise engineering details.

In 2014, the Nuclear Decommissioning Authority agreed commercial terms with developer NuGen to extend a land option agreement to build three reactors at Moorside. Later that year, HM Treasury agreed to provide financial security to investors in the project.

In July 2015, NuGen exercised its option and purchased the land near Sellafield needed for the Moorside plant, approximately 200 hectares (490 acres), for an undisclosed sum.

In October 2016, National Grid announced proposals for consultation for a £2.8 billion project to connect the new plant to the national electricity grid. The proposal involves putting power-lines underground and under Morecambe Bay to reduce the impact on the Lake District National Park.

Following the bankruptcy of Westinghouse in March 2017, Engie pulled out of NuGen in July, leaving Toshiba as the sole owner of NuGen.

In December 2017, NuGen announced that Kepco was named the preferred bidder to acquire NuGen from Toshiba. If the sale to Kepco proceeds, the three AP1000 reactors were likely to be replaced by two APR-1400 units. Tom Samson, CEO of NuGen stated "The Kepco selection presents us with a solution that fully addresses the four questions [on technology, ownership structure, funding solution, and delivery model] that we set ourselves at the start of this process. On technology, the APR1400 tech has been operational now for one year in Korea and it’s a recognised Gen III+ design, and the first Gen III+ design to go into service in the world." The potential design change to APR-1400 would delay the likely in-service date into the late 2020s or early 2030s. In July 2018, NuGen announced a consultation to lay off 100 UK staff, while it remained unclear whether the Kepco takeover would go ahead. On 25 July 2018, Toshiba terminated Kepco's status as preferred bidder, but would continue discussions with it and other potential purchasers.

On 8 November 2018, Toshiba announced they withdrawing from the project and liquidating NuGen. National Grid expects the £2.8 billion North West Coast Connections project for new power-lines to be abandoned.

In 2020, two companies – EDF and Rolls-Royce – expressed interest in restarting the project. Proposals being considered for the Moorside clean energy hub include a 3,200 MWe EPR plant, SMR or AMR modular reactors, as well as renewables, storage and hydrogen technologies.

== Opposition ==
The proposal to build the station is opposed by Radiation Free Lakeland, a group of local activists.

A report evaluating the AP1000 reactor design was written by the Edinburgh Energy and Environment Consultancy, commissioned by Radiation Free Lakeland. The report criticises the design, saying that "The AP1000 reactor design is not fit for purpose and so should be refused a Design Acceptance Confirmation (DAC) and Statement of Design Acceptability (SDA)″.

== Consultation ==
Stage 1 consultation took place between May and July 2015 and a report was published on 23 November 2015. Stage 2 consultation took place between May and July 2016.

== Design ==
Both the AP1000 and the APR-1400 are types of pressurised water reactor (PWR). PWRs constitute the large majority of the world's nuclear power plants, but there is currently only one civil PWR in the UK (Sizewell B), with two more under construction (Hinkley Point C).

=== AP1000 ===
Initial plans called for three AP1000 units at Moorside, which is a nuclear power plant designed and sold by Westinghouse. The design has improved use of passive nuclear safety, featuring fewer valves and pumps than previous PWRs and allowing cooling without intervention for up to 72 hours, relying mostly on natural processes such as water flowing downhill and heat rising. This novel design has raised a number of concerns but the design has been approved for use in both the United States and China.

In December 2011, the Office for Nuclear Regulation (ONR) and Environment Agency (EA) had issued interim design acceptance for the AP1000 reactor design. These indicated that there were 51 outstanding issues and the ONR and EA were satisfied with the plans to resolve these issues. The issues include "Justification of novel form of structure for the steel/concrete composite walls and floors known as CA modules".

In 2015, Westinghouse resumed ONR Generic Design Assessment for the AP1000. On 28 March 2017 the ONR issued a Design Acceptance Confirmation for the design, stating that the 51 issues identified in 2011 had received an adequate response. However, the following day the designer, Westinghouse, filed for Chapter 11 bankruptcy in the U.S. because of $9 billion of losses from its nuclear reactor construction projects, mostly the construction of four AP1000 reactors in the U.S.

=== APR-1400 ===
In December 2017, it was thought likely that two APR-1400 units will be intended for Moorside. The APR-1400 is designed by the Korea Electric Power Corporation (Kepco). Originally known as the Korean Next Generation Reactor (KNGR), this Generation III reactor was developed from the earlier OPR-1000 design and also incorporates features from the US Combustion Engineering (C-E) System 80+ design. Currently there are two units in operation (Shin Kori unit 3 and 4) and six units under construction, four in the United Arab Emirates at Barakah and two in South Korea(two units at Shin Hanul). Two more units are planned with construction yet to commence at Shin Kori.

=== EPR ===
In July 2020, EDF announced a proposal for two EPR units.

== Moorside clean energy hub ==
Moorside clean energy hub is a proposal put forward on 30 June 2020 by a Rolls-Royce-led UK SMR consortium, to create an energy hub that would produce electricity and hydrogen through the use of nuclear power and renewable energy.

In 2018, Toshiba abandoned its plans to build a power plant on the site, known as Moorside nuclear power station. The clean energy hub proposal was put forward to provide an alternative use for the site, in line with the UK's need to decarbonise its electricity grid and ensure reliable sources of electricity production.

The proposal for the Moorside site includes the construction of a large scale nuclear power plant with two EPR units, replicating Hinkley Point C and Sizewell C, for a total capacity of 3.2 GWe. It is hoped to lower construction costs and reduce construction times thanks to the experience gained during the construction of the two sister plants. The proposal also includes Rolls-Royce SMR or AMR modular reactors, renewable energy generation, hydrogen production and battery storage technologies.

The Nuclear Industry Association welcomed the proposal for the Moorside site, with the CEO adding, "These are exactly the attributes the country needs to bounce back from COVID-19, deliver jobs, and get us on track to hit Net Zero. Large scale and smaller, next generation technologies have a huge amount to offer working as part of the clean energy hub concept. They can deliver clean electricity and achieve deeper decarbonisation through the creation of hydrogen, clean fuels and district and industrial heating."

== See also ==
- Proposed nuclear power stations in the United Kingdom
- Moorside clean energy hub
- Nuclear power in the United Kingdom
