= Office for Nuclear Regulation =

UK Regulator for the nuclear industry

Statutory corporation overview
- Formed: 2011
- Jurisdiction: United Kingdom
- Headquarters: Building 4, Redgrave Court, Merton Road, Bootle L20 7HS
- Employees: 651 (as of 31 March 2021)
- Annual budget: £95.04m (2021/22)
- Statutory corporation executives: Mike Finnerty, Chief Executive/Chief Nuclear Inspector; Nicola Crauford, Chair
- Parent department: Department for Energy Security and Net Zero
- Website: www.onr.org.uk

The Office for Nuclear Regulation (ONR) is the regulator for the nuclear industry in the United Kingdom. It is an independent statutory corporation whose costs are met by charging fees to the nuclear industry. The ONR reports to the Department for Energy Security and Net Zero (DESNZ).

== History ==
The establishment of the ONR followed a 2008 review conducted on behalf of the Government into the regulation of the UK civil nuclear industry, recommending the creation of a single industry-specific regulator. The ONR was created on 1 April 2011 as a non-statutory agency of the Health and Safety Executive (HSE), with the Government intending to put the ONR on a statutory basis at a later date. The ONR was formed from the merger of the HSE's Nuclear Directorate (the Nuclear Installations Inspectorate, the Office for Civil Nuclear Security and the UK Safeguards Office) and — from 1 June 2011 — the Department for Transport's Radioactive Materials Transport Team. Legislation to establish the ONR was included in the Energy Act 2013, and it was formally launched as an independent statutory corporation on 1 April 2014. ONR's original mission (as detailed in the DWP/ONR Framework document) was: "To provide efficient and effective regulation of the nuclear industry, holding it to account on behalf of the public". The 2013 Energy Act specified that ONR's five statutory purposes were: Nuclear safety; Nuclear site health and safety; Civil Nuclear security; Nuclear safeguards; Transport of radioactive materials.

The ONR is governed by a ten-member board, and is accountable to Parliament through the Department for Work and Pensions (DWP) in matters of finance, governance and non-nuclear health and safety. Nick Baldwin CBE, former chief executive of Powergen (now E.ON UK) was appointed part-time interim chair of the ONR on its formation, resigning as a non-executive director of Scottish and Southern Energy. On 21 February 2019, the Secretary of State for Work and Pensions announced that Mark McAllister would succeed Baldwin as Chair of the Board. Mark McAllister began his five-year appointment as ONR Chair on 1 April 2019. The ONR Board oversees the operation of the Chief Executive Officer (CEO) and the Chief Nuclear Inspector (CNI). John Jenkins, who was CEO from 2013 to 2015, resigned from his post on 28 February 2015 and was replaced by Les Philpott on 1 March 2015 as the Interim Chief Executive. Adriènne Kelbie was appointed Chief Executive and took up the appointment on 18 January 2016. In October 2017 Mark Foy was appointed Chief Nuclear Inspector; he was previously the Deputy Chief Nuclear Inspector.

New leadership arrangements commenced on 1 June 2021 which saw Mark Foy become ONR's combined Chief Executive and Chief Nuclear Inspector. Donald Urquhart was appointed Executive Director of Regulation and Sarah High as Deputy Chief Executive. Additionally, Paul Fyfe was appointed as Director of Regulation Civil Nuclear Security and Safeguards, Jane Bowie was appointed as Director of Regulation for New Reactors, Mike Finnerty was appointed Director of Regulation Operating Facilities, Paul Dicks was appointed Director of Regulation Sellafield, Decommissioning Fuel and Waste and Steve Vinson was appointed Technical Director.

As of 2021 the ONR had about 650 staff and a budget of £95.05 million, which was largely cost-recovered from users, with a 2% grant from the DWP.

In 2025, the government announced the Atlantic Partnership for Advanced Nuclear Energy, which will permit fast-track new reactor design reviews by permitting the ONR and the US Nuclear Regulatory Commission to accept parts of each other's safety assessment, eliminating duplication, aiming to reduce ONR assessment time to about two years.

On 1 August 2026, sponsorship of the ONR transferred from the DWP to the Department for Energy Security and Net Zero (DESNZ).

== Generic Design Assessment process ==
Following the 2006 Energy review the Nuclear Installations Inspectorate developed the Generic Design Assessment process (GDA), now operated by ONR, to assess new nuclear reactor designs ahead of site-specific proposals. The GDA initially started assessing four designs:

- Westinghouse AP1000
- Areva EPR
- CANDU ACR-1000
- GE-Hitachi ESBWR

However the ACR-1000 and ESBWR were subsequently withdrawn from the assessment for commercial reasons, leaving the EPR and AP1000 as contenders for British new nuclear builds. Assessment of the AP1000 was suspended in December 2011 at Westinghouse's request, awaiting a firm UK customer before addressing issues raised by the assessment.

In 2012 Hitachi purchased Horizon Nuclear Power, announcing intent to build two to three 1,350 MWe Advanced Boiling Water Reactors (ABWR) on both of Horizon's sites. The GDA was agreed in April 2013.

In August 2014 Westinghouse resumed the AP1000 assessment, after Toshiba and ENGIE purchased NuGeneration and announced plans to develop Moorside Nuclear Power Station with 3 AP1000s. In November 2016 the ONR noted there was a "very large amount of assessment to complete with issues still emerging". On 30 March 2017 the AP1000 successfully completed the GDA process, ironically the day after the designer, Westinghouse, filed for Chapter 11 bankruptcy because of $9 billion of losses from its nuclear reactor construction projects, mostly the construction of four AP1000 reactors in the U.S.

On 21 September 2015 Energy Secretary Amber Rudd announced that a Chinese designed nuclear power station was expected to be built at Bradwell nuclear power station. On 19 January 2017 the GDA process for the Hualong One (HPR1000) started, and successfully finished in February 2022.

The ABWR GDA process completed successfully in December 2017.

=== 2020 process update ===
In 2020, the GDA process was updated to be more suitable for small modular reactors and advanced nuclear technologies. A three step process was introduced:

- Step 1: initiates GDA and agrees scope and timescales, identifying any immediate gaps in meeting regulatory expectations.
- Step 2: fundamental assessment of the generic safety, security, and environment protection cases, to identify any potential "show-stoppers" that may preclude deployment of the design.
- Step 3: detailed assessment of the generic safety, security, and environment protection cases on a sampling basis.

On 1 April 2022, the GDA Step 1 of the 470 MWe Rolls-Royce SMR started. Step 2 will begin once the timescales and resources have been agreed.

== Nuclear defence activities ==
Although the ONR is primarily a civil regulator, the ONR Defence Programme regulates military nuclear and conventional safety across a number of licensed and non-licensed nuclear sites, which are operated for the Ministry of Defence (MOD) nuclear defence capability. This is carried out under a complex legal regime, in conjunction with MOD's Defence Nuclear Safety Regulator (DNSR). The ONR does not influence the design of submarine nuclear power plants or nuclear weapons, and does not regulate security or transport of MOD nuclear materials.

ONR responsibility includes assessing the response systems for nuclear weapon accidents at HMNB Clyde and RNAD Coulport, in Argyll, Scotland.

Since about 2013 the ONR has given the two major Atomic Weapons Establishment (AWE) sites enhanced regulatory attention due to "safety and compliance concerns, and the continued undertaking of operations in ageing facilities due to delays to the delivery of modern standard replacement facilities." The ONR anticipated AWE would move back to normal regulatory attention in 2021 after the new facilities are completed.

== See also ==
- Nuclear power in the United Kingdom
- As low as reasonably practicable
- United Kingdom#Energy
