= Generation Investment Management =

Investment management firm

Generation Investment Management LLP
- Type: Independent, private, owner-managed partnership
- Industry: Financial services
- Founded: April 2004; 22 years ago, London
- Headquarters: London, United Kingdom
- Area served: Worldwide
- Key people: Al Gore (chairman); David Blood (senior partner); Mark Ferguson (co-chief investment officer); Miguel Nogales (co-chief investment officer); Colin le Duc (founding partner)
- Services: Investment management
- Website: www.generationim.com

Generation Investment Management (Generation IM) is a sustainable investment management firm founded in 2004; its co-founders included former US Vice President Al Gore and former Goldman Sachs' Asset Management head David Blood, along with five other founders, with a vision to see long-term sustainable investing become best practice and for sustainable capitalism to become the enduring economic model.

Generation operates four strategies, investing both public and private equity: Global Equity, Asia Equity, Growth Equity and Private Equity; alongside a climate-led investing business, Just Climate.

Generation has offices in London, San Francisco and São Paulo, and as of 2025, employed over 100 people. Generation Investment Management LLP is authorized and regulated by the Financial Conduct Authority in the UK.

Generation has built a global research platform to integrate sustainability research into fundamental equity analysis.

== History ==
Generation was founded in April 2004 by a group of seven founding partners led by Al Gore and David Blood. Its goal was integrating the disciplines of finance and sustainability.

In 2021 Generation launched Just Climate, a climate-led investment business aiming to address the net-zero challenge at scale. It closed its inaugural Climate Assets Fund I in 2023, raising $1.5 billion.

== Partnerships ==
- Net Zero Asset Managers initiative
- The Climate Pledge
- Ceres
- The Alliance for Climate Protection (Repower America)
- World Resources Institute
- Natural Resources Defense Council
- The Climate Project

== Investments ==
Investments by Generation funds include:

- Octopus Energy
- Proterra
