= Horizon Nuclear Power =

British company

Horizon Nuclear Power Limited
- Industry: electricity generation
- Founded: 2009
- Headquarters: Gloucester, UK
- Key people: Duncan Hawthorne - CEO
- Products: electrical power
- Owner: Hitachi
- Website: horizonnuclearpower.com

Horizon Nuclear Power is a British energy company that was expected to build new nuclear power stations in the United Kingdom. It was established in 2009, with its head office in Gloucester, and is now owned by Hitachi.

On 17 January 2019, Horizon suspended its UK nuclear development programme.

== Early history ==
The company was established in 2009 as an E.ON UK and RWE Npower joint venture. The company announced its intention to install about 6,000 MWe of new nuclear capacity adjacent to the existing Wylfa and Oldbury nuclear power stations. Horizon initially evaluated building either Areva 1,650 MWe EPR reactors or Westinghouse 1,100 MWe AP1000 reactors between 2020 and 2024.

In March 2012, E.ON and RWE Npower placed Horizon up for sale as a going concern. One bidder was a joint venture of China Guangdong Nuclear Power Group and the China National Nuclear Corporation.

However, on 29 October 2012, it was announced that Hitachi would buy Horizon for £696 million, and the sale was completed on 26 November 2012.

== Hitachi ownership ==
Hitachi intended to build two to three 1,350 MWe Advanced Boiling Water Reactors (ABWR) on each site, but first required a Generic Design Assessment (GDA) for the ABWR by the Office for Nuclear Regulation. The assessment began in April 2013, with an agreement that the costs of the assessment would be covered by Hitachi-GE. In August 2014, the proposed reactor type reached the third stage, out of four, in the GDA process.

In 2013, Horizon planned initial site work at Wylfa to begin in 2015, with building work starting in 2018 and generation starting in the mid-2020s. However, later Horizon delayed the start of site work until after the GDA is completed.

In January 2016, Hitachi announced a new UK company, Hitachi Nuclear Energy Europe, to lead a proposed joint venture with Bechtel and JGC Corporation, to cover the engineering, procurement and construction of Horizon's nuclear plants in the UK. Horizon Nuclear Power would continue to work on obtaining regulatory consents and making commercial arrangements. However, later in the month Hiroaki Nakanishi, chairman and chief executive of Hitachi, expressed serious concerns to the Foreign Secretary Philip Hammond over financing the scheme, following EDF's difficulty in financing Hinkley Point C. Hitachi negotiated with the Department of Energy and Climate Change (DECC) on electricity price guarantees, called Contracts for Difference (CfD). The first project at Wylfa would be financed externally, with Hitachi only taking a minority stake.

In May 2016, Duncan Hawthorne, previously CEO of Bruce Power in Canada, was appointed CEO of Horizon. In February 2017 Horizon contracted U.S. Exelon to provide expert staff to assist in developing Horizon's nuclear operating model.

The ABWR GDA process was completed successfully in December 2017.

As of 2017, Horizon planned to build two ABWRs at each site, subject to finance and contract agreement. Horizon believed that the consensus of government and industry was that the Contract for Difference financing model used for Hinkley Point C nuclear power station, involving fully private sector financing, would not be used for subsequent nuclear plants, and discussions were held with government about alternative financing models. Hawthorne, Horizon CEO, stated "We are an insurance policy for a long-term stable supply and there is a price for that certainty".

In December 2018, Hitachi's chairman stated they were struggling to find investors for the Wylfa plant. Later TV Asahi in Japan reported that the Wylfa scheme may be scrapped, resulting in an increase in the value of Hitachi's shares.

On 17 January 2019, Horizon announced that "it will suspend its UK nuclear development programme, following a decision taken by its parent company Hitachi". The UK government had been willing to take a one-third equity stake in the project, to consider providing all the required debt financing, and to provide a Contract for Difference for the electricity generated at up to £75/MWh for 35 years. Greg Clark, minister for Business, Energy and Industrial Strategy, stated this was a "generous package of potential support that going beyond what any government had been willing to consider in the past". However this did not provide an adequate "economic rationality as a private enterprise" for Hitachi to proceed.

Hitachi had spent nearly £2 billion on Horizon since 2012, and the Wylfa ABWR development had been expected to cost about £15 billion.

Following the suspension, Horizon made most of its 380 staff redundant, retaining just a few site maintenance staff and those involved in governmental discussions about possible future funding of the development.

In April 2020 a director of Horizon stated that the future of next two nuclear builds, Wylfa and EDF's Sizewell C, depended on the government accepting the Regulated Asset Base (RAB) financial assistance model rather than the existing Contract for Difference support mechanism, which would allow developers to need less upfront private finance as some finance would be backed by end consumer billing.

In June 2020 The Sunday Times reported that the U.S. government had warned Hitachi not to sell Horizon to Chinese companies for security reasons. Horizon responded there were no such plans, and stated "We don't comment on speculation. Our focus remains on securing the conditions necessary to restart this crucial project, which would bring transformative economic benefits to the region and play a huge role in helping deliver the UK's climate change commitments." Shortly after, in August, the FT reported that the British government and Hitachi have recently been in talks over the possibility of resumption of Horizon's operation.

In September 2020, Hitachi announced its withdrawal from the Wylfa and Oldbury projects, due to the lack of progress in the 20 months since suspending the project, and to the difficult investment environment following the COVID-19 pandemic. Horizon will close down its development activities, but will work with the UK government and other stakeholders to facilitate future options for the two sites.

In March 2024, Great British Nuclear bought the Oldbury and Wylfa sites in a deal worth £160m.

== See also ==
- Economics of new nuclear power plants
