= Octopus Group =

UK financial holding company

Octopus Capital Limited
- Formerly: Octopus Capital Plc (19 April 2000–7 July 2006)
- Type: Holding
- Industry: Holding
- Founded: 19 April 2000; 26 years ago in London, England
- Founders: Simon Rogerson; Christopher Hulatt; Guy Myles
- Headquarters: London, England
- Area served: Worldwide
- Key people: Simon Rogerson (CEO)
- Revenue: ▼£12.4 billion (FY2024)
- Net income: ▼£83 million (FY2024)
- AUM: ▲£9.9 billion (June 2025)
- Number of employees: 8,500 (2024)
- Subsidiaries: Octopus Energy; Octopus Renewables; Octopus Renewables Infrastructure Trust; Octopus Investments
- Website: www.octopusgroup.com

Octopus Capital Limited (formerly Octopus Capital Plc), commonly known as Octopus Group, is a privately held United Kingdom based holding company founded in 2000 by Simon Rogerson, Christopher Hulatt and Guy Myles as a fund management company.

Through its subsidiaries, it operates in the investment management, venture capital, energy, and real estate industries.

== Businesses ==
=== Octopus Energy ===
Octopus Energy was established in 2015 as a retail electricity and gas supplier in the UK, and by December 2019, had over 1.35 million domestic and business customers. Under the Octopus Energy Group brand, it has expanded into energy for business and energy services, and licences its customer handling software to other energy suppliers.

=== Octopus Energy Generation ===
Octopus Energy Generation owns and manages renewable energy production, particularly in solar and onshore wind. According to its own website, it is one of the largest owners of renewable energy infrastructure in Europe, with £3bn of assets under management. Previously a separate entity within Octopus Group, the company was acquired by Octopus Energy in July 2021. Octopus Energy Generation is the manager of Octopus Renewables Infrastructure Trust, an investment fund which was floated on the London Stock Exchange in December 2019.

=== Octopus Inheritance Tax Service ===
Octopus Inheritance Tax Service (OITS) provides investors a possibility to purchase shares of one or more unquoted UK companies that are contributing to the UK economy growth. Notable investments include Fern Trading Ltd., a £2.8 billion trading company with a concentration on short-term loans to seasoned real estate professionals, as well as the development and management of fiber broadband in underserved areas. In 2020, Vorboss was added to Fern's portfolio of UK broadband network builders, getting £250 million in funding.

In July 2026, OITS told its 18,000 customers that it had frozen redemptions (block on customers withdrawing their cash) until it had finalised a takeover. In September 2026, it told customers the blocks "need to remain in place for a short additional period". Octopus Investments, which administers the scheme, warned customers a final agreement was still needed and the outcome was not certain.

=== Octopus Money ===
Octopus Money was launched in 2023 to offer money coaching and advice to consumers, often through the individual's employer. The business is run by Ruth Handcock, who joined Octopus Investments from Tandem Bank in 2018. The launch of the brand followed the purchase of Hatch Financial Coaching in 2021, and replaced Octopus Wealth, a financial advice business announced in 2018.

=== Octopus Investments ===
Octopus Investments, part of Octopus Group, is a UK-based investment management company founded in 2000. As of June 2025, it manages £9.9 billion on behalf of retail and institutional investors. The firm employs over 600 people and is headquartered in London.

Octopus Investments stated in 2026 that it is the UK's largest provider of specialist tax-efficient investments that qualify for relief from inheritance tax, and manages investment for over 75,000 investors. In July 2026, The Daily Telegraph reported that concerns had been raised about how the companies owned by its Octopus Inheritance Tax Service (OITS) investment product are valued.

Octopus Investments is a certified B Corporation. It offers a range of products for retail investors, including venture capital trusts (VCTs), enterprise investment schemes (EIS), business relief-qualifying investments, and listed UK small and medium-sized company funds. Its institutional strategies focus on renewable energy, sustainable infrastructure, real estate, healthcare, and venture capital.

Octopus Capital and Octopus Ventures operate as divisions within Octopus Investments. Octopus Investments Ltd is authorised and regulated by the UK Financial Conduct Authority.

Octopus Ventures is a venture capital fund with assets of £1.7bn as of 2022. Notable Octopus Ventures investments include SwiftKey, ManyPets, Graze, and Zoopla.

Octopus Capital is an institutional asset manager specialising in real estate, energy and infrastructure, and private debt. The company was previously known as Octopus Institutional Investments and Octopus Real Estate. It focuses on alternative assets, with strategies designed to deliver financial returns while addressing wider economic and social challenges.

=== Octopus Legacy ===
Octopus Legacy is a UK company that provides estate planning, probate, and bereavement support services. The business was founded in 2016 as Guardian Angel by entrepreneur Sam Grice after the sudden death of his mother, with the aim of making bereavement and estate planning easier to navigate. Headquartered in London, it became part of Octopus Group in 2022.

=== Seccl Technology ===
Seccl is a British financial technology company that provides investment-platform infrastructure and custody services to financial advisers, wealth managers and consumer-facing financial services businesses. Its technology allows firms to build and operate investment propositions, including individual savings accounts, general investment accounts and self-invested personal pensions. The company was founded in Bath, England, in 2017 by Dave Harvey and Hugo Thorman. In 2019, Octopus Group acquired Seccl in a deal valued at £10 million.

Seccl operates through Seccl Technology Limited and its subsidiary Seccl Custody Limited, which is authorised and regulated by the Financial Conduct Authority. Its platform is used by financial advice businesses and technology companies, including Monzo, MoneySuperMarket, Tide and Söderberg & Partners. In 2026, Seccl established an Irish business as part of its planned expansion into the European market.
