= E.ON UK =

Energy company in the United Kingdom

E.ON UK PLC
- Type: Subsidiary
- Traded as: LSE: PGN
- Industry: Energy
- Founded: 1989; 37 years ago (as Powergen)
- Headquarters: Coventry, England
- Key people: Chris Norbury (CEO)
- Products: Residential and business electricity; Gas supply
- Revenue: £5.8 billion (2017)
- Operating income: £255.6 million (2017)
- Number of employees: 9,400 (2018)
- Parent: E.ON
- Subsidiaries: E.ON Next; OVO Energy
- Website: www.eonenergy.com

E.ON UK is a British energy company and one of the largest suppliers of energy in the UK, following its acquisition of Npower. It is a subsidiary of E.ON of Germany and one of the Big Six energy suppliers. It was founded in 1989 as Powergen, and was listed on the London Stock Exchange and was once a constituent of the FTSE 100 Index. It has been a subsidiary of E.ON since 1 July 2002.

E.ON was formerly a vertically integrated utility company with interests in electrical generation, electricity distribution in the Midlands region, and in the electricity and gas supply markets. It took a pioneering role in the development of large scale renewables including the construction and operation of the UK's first offshore wind farm at Blyth in Northumberland. It became one of the first in the world, and the first major UK energy company, to significantly alter its structure by spinning off its fossil generation business so it could focus on energy supply, grid development and renewables.

== History ==
Former logo used until 2007

Powergen was formed in 1989 as a public limited company which was wholly owned by the UK government and acquired about 50% of the Central Electricity Generating Board generating capacity. Sir Robert Malpas was Chairman of the Group from 1989 to 1991. Sixty per cent of Powergen was sold to private investors in 1991, followed by the remaining 40% in March 1995. It expanded considerably by acquiring the regional electricity company East Midlands Electricity in 1998 and the supply business of TXU Energi in 2002. Powergen was eventually taken over itself by E.ON, with the original offer made in April 2001, an acquisition which was completed in January 2002.

It then bought the distribution network operator Midlands Electricity in 2004. This was merged with the distribution business of East Midlands Electricity and rebranded as Central Networks. The Industrial & Commercial Retail business was rebranded as E.ON UK on 5 July 2004. The creation of the Central Networks business in April 2004 included "a company of E.ON" as part of its logotype. In October 2005 it was also added to the Powergen logotype.

In June 2007, a major advertising campaign entitled "The wind of change", containing advertisements using the E.ON logo, was launched. The campaign featured the Robin Rigg offshore wind farm in the Solway Firth, currently in development. In the consumer market, this was complemented by a replacement of the mostly blue Powergen identity to the red identity of E.ON, and the launch of a new product, Go Green, using electricity from renewable sources and carbon offset gas.

On 22 October 2007, the company announced that the E.ON Energy and Powergen brands would change to E.ON as of 1 November and 3 December 2007 respectively.

In January 2008, E.ON acquired West Midlands-based CHN Group, a provider of heating services to builders, local authorities and housing associations across the region. and in August 2008 completed the purchase of the Street Lighting business lighting projects of ABB Ltd. It intended to improve its existing lighting business by purchasing ABB.

In 2008 and 2009 a number of protests took place at E.ON UK's power station including a Climate Camp at their Kingsnorth power station in August 2008 and at their Ratcliffe-on-Soar Power Station in October 2009.

=== Restructuring ===
On 20 January 2010, E.ON UK announced the closure of its Rayleigh Customer Service Centre and the loss of 600 jobs. The company was forced to bring forward the announcement by one day after the information was leaked to a local newspaper. This has been criticised as a money-saving exercise by an organisation which has seen an increase in profits of 18% in 2009 and news that E.ON UK have made £80 million in profits so far in the financial year 2009/10. Other businesses within E.ON were also affected by these round of job losses, including its IT support and its Highways Lighting operations.

In March 2011, E.ON sold Central Networks to PPL's UK subsidiary Western Power Distribution for £3.5 billion.

In October 2012, E.ON sold its 50% stake in Horizon Nuclear Power to Hitachi for £348 million. The other 50% stake, held by RWE npower, was also sold to Hitachi for the same amount, giving a total sale value of £696 million.

Late in 2012, E.ON UK announced the closure of the 'Ignite' business, originally tasked with bringing alternative localised-generation products to market for E.ON UK.

In 2013, E.ON Home Energy Services was sold in a management buyout.

=== Acquisition of Npower ===
Just after the failed SSE-Npower merger of retail assets in late 2018, it was reported that the Big Six energy suppliers would still consolidate to the Big Five, as Npower would be acquired by default by E.on UK, due to the already-planned asset swap of the respective German parents Innogy and E.ON. Following the merger of npower, E.ON UK became the largest overall provider of electricity and gas in the UK; remaining the second largest provider of electricity and gas to domestic customers.

=== Acquisition of OVO Energy ===
In May 2026, E.ON announced it had reached an agreement to acquire OVO Energy, subject to regulatory approval. The Competition and Markets Authority approved the acquisition on 1 October 2026, and it completed on 8 October 2026. Following the acquisition, the combined company is Britain's second-largest energy supplier, holding a 25% market share.

== E.ON Next ==
E.ON Next is the E.ON UK energy retail business, supplying electricity and gas to residential and SME customers.

As of July 2023, E.ON Next has a 17.1% UK market share of domestic electricity supply and 14.4% UK market share of domestic gas supply. The company currently employs between 1000 and 5000 employees.

=== History ===
After the acquisition of Npower in 2019, E.ON announced its bid to re-invent the business by launching E.ON Next, which has been built from the ground up as a new organisation and brand. E.ON Next entered a strategic agreement with Octopus Energy Group to adopt the Kraken Technologies customer platform.

In May 2021, the company announced it migrated 2 million former Npower customers onto E.ON Next's new platform, including subsidiary companies npower Select, Wigan Warriors Energy and Wasps Energy as well as Powershop. Former CEO Mike Lewis (succeeded by Chris Norbury in 2023) also revealed in an interview to BBC that they will migrate all existing E.ON customers to the new platform. The migration of E.ON customers was successfully completed over two years with unprecedented success, making it one of the fastest and largest customer migrations undertaken in the UK.

E.ON Next was appointed to take on Hub Energy's 15,000 customers by Ofgem in August 2021. This was followed by ENSTROGA, Igloo Energy, and Symbio Energy in the same year.

=== Awards ===
Date	Award	Category	Winner
February 2022	German Design Awards – Special Mention	Excellent communications design	E.ON Next
February 2022	German Design Awards – Special Mention	Brand identity	E.ON Next
March 2022	Transform Awards Europe – Gold	Best development of a new brand within an existing brand portfolio	E.ON Next and R/GA Media
May 2022	iF Design Awards	Energy company branding	E.ON Next and R/GA Media
July 2023	USwitch Energy Awards – Special Commendation	Consistency through the crisis	E.ON Next
October 2023	Vulnerability Awareness Gala	Best use of technology	Philips & Cohen Associates and E.ON Next

=== Customers migrated to E.ON Next in 2021 ===
When an energy supplier goes out of business, customers are moved to a new supplier by Ofgem, to ensure continuity of electricity and gas supply. Due to sudden spikes in wholesale costs, an unusually high number of suppliers went out of business in 2021, resulting in several companies’ customers being migrated to supply with E.ON Next.

Failed suppliers whose customers were migrated to E.ON Next:

- Hub Energy. Customers migrated to E.ON Next from 13 August 2021.
- ENSTROGA. Customers migrated to E.ON Next from 3 October 2021.
- Igloo Energy. Customers migrated to E.ON Next from 3 October 2021.
- Symbio Energy. Customers migrated to E.ON Next from 3 October 2021.

=== Renewable electricity and sustainability ===
E.ON Next supplies fixed, dynamic, time-of-use and variable energy tariffs to customers. The electricity supplied to homes and businesses comes from the National Grid.

They also offer electric vehicle home chargers, energy efficient boilers, solar panel installations, Battery Storage systems and heat pumps.

They also re-introduced their EV tariff, Next Drive, in 2023, enabling customers to take advantage of lower overnight charging prices for their electric vehicles.

== Operations ==
The company's headquarters are in Coventry at Westwood Business Park, in a building designed by Bennetts Associates. There are numerous other offices and power generation sites across the country.

UK businesses

E.ON UK's businesses consist of:

- Energy Solutions (a merger of the former Retail and Energy Services businesses)
- Business Services (an internal service provider)
- Central functions including Corporate Affairs & Finance under the banner UK Centre
- E.ON Climate and Renewables – renewables and climate protection projects
- E.ON IT UK – the company's IT service provider
- E.ON Next – which services its residential and small business customers.
- npower Business Solutions – mid-market & large business energy supply.

=== Generation ===
E.ON operates a number of onshore and offshore wind farms, biomass power stations, Combined Heat and Power plants in the UK. It formerly ran a number of fossil plants which are now wholly owned and run by Uniper.

== Sponsorship ==
=== ITV National Weather ===
Powergen/E.ON sponsored the ITV National Weather forecasts from its launch on 13 February 1989 until 31 December 2007, a period of 18 years. They were known for their memorable sponsorship sequences from a set introduced on 12 April 1993 which featured weather themes circulating around (or parts of) the Powergen logo, and from 20 November 1996, the WeatherGens, a "mascot" of Powergen representing different types of weather. After several different sets of idents throughout the 2000s, Powergen eventually became E.ON in 2007 and the sponsorship was changed to accommodate the name change. The sponsorship ended on 31 December 2007 and from 4 July 2016 to 8 July 2018, ITV National Weather was sponsored by rival energy company SSE on all ITV plc stations and UTV.

=== Sport ===
In 2006, E.ON UK announced that it was to be the sponsor of the FA Cup for a four-year period. During this period, the competition is formally called "The FA Cup sponsored by E.ON". Before 2006, the company had sponsored the rugby union and rugby league cup competitions under the Powergen brand. The original four-year deal was extended to a fifth year as the Football Association failed to secure a new sponsor. The announcement was unpopular as it was made in the same week as the confirmation of closure of the Rayleigh Call Centre.

The company was the energy partner of the English Football League, and sponsors the E.ON Lounge at the Ricoh Arena, the home of Coventry City F.C. Football Club.

In other sports, E.ON UK sponsored the Tour of Britain cycling championship from 2007 to 2009, and in 2007 launched a campaign with Ellen MacArthur to encourage energy efficiency within businesses.

== Distribution network operators ==
E.ON UK is an energy supplier for homes across the country. They do not however manage the network of towers and cables that distributes electricity – these are maintained by distribution network operators (DNOs) which vary from region to region.

== See also ==
- Big Six energy suppliers
- Energy policy of the United Kingdom
- Energy use and conservation in the United Kingdom
- Scroby Sands wind farm
