= Keadby Power Stations =

Gas-fired power station

Keadby Power Station
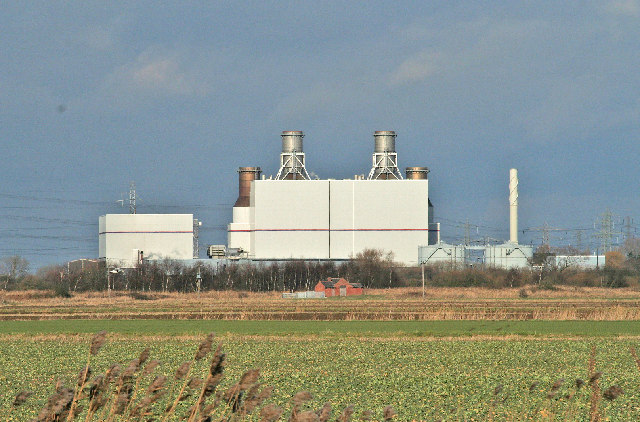
- Keadby gas-fired power station in 2006
- Country: England
- Location: North Lincolnshire, Yorkshire and the Humber
- Coordinates: 53.594444°N 0.750442°W
- Construction began: Coal-fired: 1948
- Commission date: Coal-fired: 1952; Gas-fired: 1996
- Decommission date: Coal-fired: 1984
- Owner: SSE plc
- Operator: SSE Thermal

Thermal power station
- Primary fuel: Natural gas
- Tertiary fuel: Coal

External links
- Commons: Related media on Commons

Keadby Power Stations are a pair of natural gas-fired power stations near Scunthorpe in North Lincolnshire, built on the site of an older coal power station. The site lies near the B1392 and the River Trent, and the Scunthorpe-Grimsby railway. Also nearby is the Stainforth and Keadby Canal, which is part of the Sheffield and South Yorkshire Navigation. The current stations are operated by SSE Thermal.

SSE also owns a 68 MWe-capacity wind farm, Keadby Wind Farm, nearby. This was England's largest onshore wind farm, and started operating in July 2014.

== Keadby Gas Power Station ==
Keadby Gas Power Station was commissioned on 22 January 1996, and was opened by Scottish Hydro Electric and NORWEB when the site was in South Humberside. Scottish Hydro bought the 50% share of Keadby Generation Ltd, then owned by United Utilities, in March 1997 for £253 million. It is now owned by Scottish and Southern Energy.

In March 2013 the power station was 'deep mothballed' in response to adverse market conditions; it reopened in December 2015 after winning a stand-by contract to provide 734 MWe of capacity.

It is a CCGT type power station running on natural gas. There are two General Electric Frame 9FA gas turbines each rated at 250 MWe. The total thermal input is 1329 MW. Each gas turbine is connected to a heat recovery steam generator which connect to one steam turbine which has an output of 260 MWe. Steam is condensed using water from the River Trent. There is a 25 MWe 11 kV gas turbine available for black starts when there is no power to start producing electricity. The station connects to the National Grid at 400 kV, being used for baseload.

== Keadby 2 ==
In 1999, Scottish Hydro applied to add another 710 MWe of capacity at Keadby, and a variation to this consent was granted in November 2016. The project, called 'Keadby 2', was announced in May 2018. It uses a single Siemens Energy SGT5-9000HL turbine.

Construction on the plant, now rated at 893 MWe, began in August 2018. The station was planned to come online in October 2022, but this date was missed, with the plant coming online in February 2023. As of 2024, Keadby 2 at 849 MW is the biggest single-turbine combined cycle powerplant in the world, and the most efficient at 64%.

It was produced by Siemens Energy (Siemens Gas and Power plant Berlin) and delivered by ship in May 2020. The Combined-cycle power plant emits 3.7 mio tons of carbon dioxide per year less than a Coal-fired power station with the same capacity.

== Keadby Three ==
In December 2022, development consent was obtained for a third plant on the Keadby site. Keadby Three is planned to be a 910 MWe plant with carbon capture and storage, with opening planned as soon as 2027.

== Keadby coal-fired station ==
The first power station on the site was authorised in 1947 and work on the foundations began in July 1948 and the first unit was commissioned in 1952. It was designed to have a total capacity of 360 MW.

The plant comprised six Stirling single radiant drum, pulverised fuel, twin furnace boilers. Each boiler had an evaporation capacity of 550,000 lb/hr (69.3 kg/s) of steam, the total evaporative capacity of the completed station was 3,300,000 lb/hr (415.8 kg/s). Steam conditions were 925 psi and 915 °F (63.8 bar and 490.6 °C).

There were six Parsons 60 MW hydrogen cooled turbo-alternators, generating at 11 kV. The first set was commissioned in April 1952, followed by the other sets in November 1952, June 1953, June 1954, December 1954 and December 1955. In 1952 the boiler associated with the first set was the largest yet commissioned in the UK.

It was officially opened in April 1956, and cost £16m.

The generating capacity and electricity output from Keadby power station is given in the following table.

Keadby generating capacity and output
	1954	1955	1956	1957	1958	1961	1962	1963	1967	1971	1979	1982
Installed capacity, MW	168	280	336	336	336	378	378	378	360	360	360	360
Electricity output, GWh	771.61	1330.66	1990.75	2144.09	2258.40	2369.13	2252.196	2052.925	2031.0	1186.19	970.29	431.18

The coal-fired station closed in 1984.

== See also ==
- Keadby Generation Ltd - the company owned by Scottish & Southern Energy that also ran Fiddler's Ferry power station.
