= Tawnaghmore Power Station =

Irish power station

- Country: Ireland
- Location: County Mayo
- Coordinates: 54.19415°N 9.22072°W
- Status: Operational
- Commission date: 2003
- Owner: SSE Thermal
- Operator: SSE Thermal

Thermal power station
- Primary fuel: Natural gas
- Secondary fuel: Distillate oil
- Turbine technology: Gas turbine

Power generation
- Units operational: 52 MW (Unit 1); 52 MW (Unit 2)
- Nameplate capacity: 104 MW

Tawnaghmore Power Station is a 104 MW gas/oil fired 'peaker plant' situated south of Killala in County Mayo, Ireland.

== Current operations ==
The current power station commenced commercial operation in 2003 and is currently operated by SSE Thermal. SSE acquired the plant from Endesa along with three other operational assets (Tarbert, Great Island and Rhode) when they agreed to buy shares of Endesa Ireland for a total consideration of €320m.

The plant comprises two 52 MW gas/oil-fired open cycle unit turbines. Its principle function is to help maintain the security of electricity supply in Ireland's all-island Single Electricity Market (SEM) by being available to operate on quick response to peaks in national energy demand. Unit 1 commenced operation in December 2003. The installation of a second turbine occurred in 2008 and doubled the electrical output capacity to 104 MW.

In addition to the combustion plant itself, the main infrastructure on side includes a water treatment plant, water storage tanks, bunded steel oil storage tanks and bunded transformers.
