= Rhode Power Station =

Irish power station

- Country: Ireland
- Location: County Offaly
- Coordinates: 53.35922°N 7.2123°W
- Status: Operational
- Commission date: 2004
- Owners: ESB (1960-2009); Endesa (2009-2012); SSE Thermal (2012-)
- Operator: SSE Thermal

Thermal power station
- Primary fuel: Natural gas
- Secondary fuel: Distillate oil
- Turbine technology: Gas turbine

Power generation
- Units operational: 52 MW (Unit 1); 52 MW (Unit 2)
- Nameplate capacity: 104 MW

Rhode Power Station is a 104 MW gas/oil fired peaker plant situated beside the village of Rhode in County Offaly, Ireland. It replaced an 80 MW peat fueled power station operated by ESB that was decommissioned in 2003.

== Current operations ==
The current power station commenced commercial operation in 2004 and is currently operated by SSE Thermal. SSE acquired the plant from Endesa along with three other operational assets (Tarbert, Great Island and Tawnaghmore) when they agreed to buy shares of Endesa Ireland for a total consideration of €320m.

The plant comprises two 52 MW gas/oil-fired open cycle unit turbines. Its principal function is to help maintain the security of electricity supply in Ireland's all-island Single Electricity Market (SEM) by being available to operate on quick response to peaks in national energy demand.

== Rhode Generating Station (ESB) ==
Rhode Generating Station was situated in the midlands, about eighteen miles outside of Tullamore, County Offaly. It was constructed as part of the Peat Development Programme in the 1960s, and was considered to be the most efficient of Ireland's five peat generating stations.

Construction work at Rhode station began in 1958, at a time when the Government placed a strong emphasis on the development of the country's native resources. At the same time, demands for industry were beginning to grow as the country finally began to emerge from a lengthy and crippling economic slowdown. As a result of the Rural Electrification Scheme, many parts of Ireland were beginning to benefit from easier access to electricity. Rhode was a part of a new generation of power stations, using milled peat as opposed to sod peat, The station was built on a 70-acre site, chosen for its proximity to both a large supply of peat, and a good source of water from the Yellow River.

The station was complete in two separate developments: 'A' station in 1960 and 'B' station in 1963. The first station consisted of two 190,000 pounds of steam per hour boilers, driving two 20 MW turbo-alternator units and the second station consisted of a single boiler with an output of 380,000 pounds of steam per hour and a 40 MW turbo-alternator. Milled peat was supplied by Bord na Móna from local production, and transported to the station by narrow-gauge railways. Wagons, each containing 5 tonnes, were emptied automatically by the tippler and the peat was then transported by conveyor belt to the bunkers at a rate of 2,000 tonnes per day. At its peak in the 1980s and 1990s, the station burned 450,000 tonnes of peat annually, to generate 300 million kilowatt-hours of electricity.

Rhode Generating Station was decommissioned in 2003 and demolished in 2004.
