= Kilrush =

Town in County Clare, Ireland

Kilrush Irish: Cill Rois
- Town
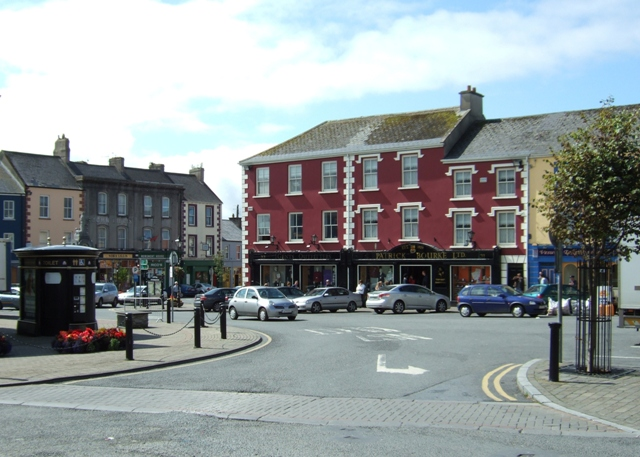
- Kilrush town centre

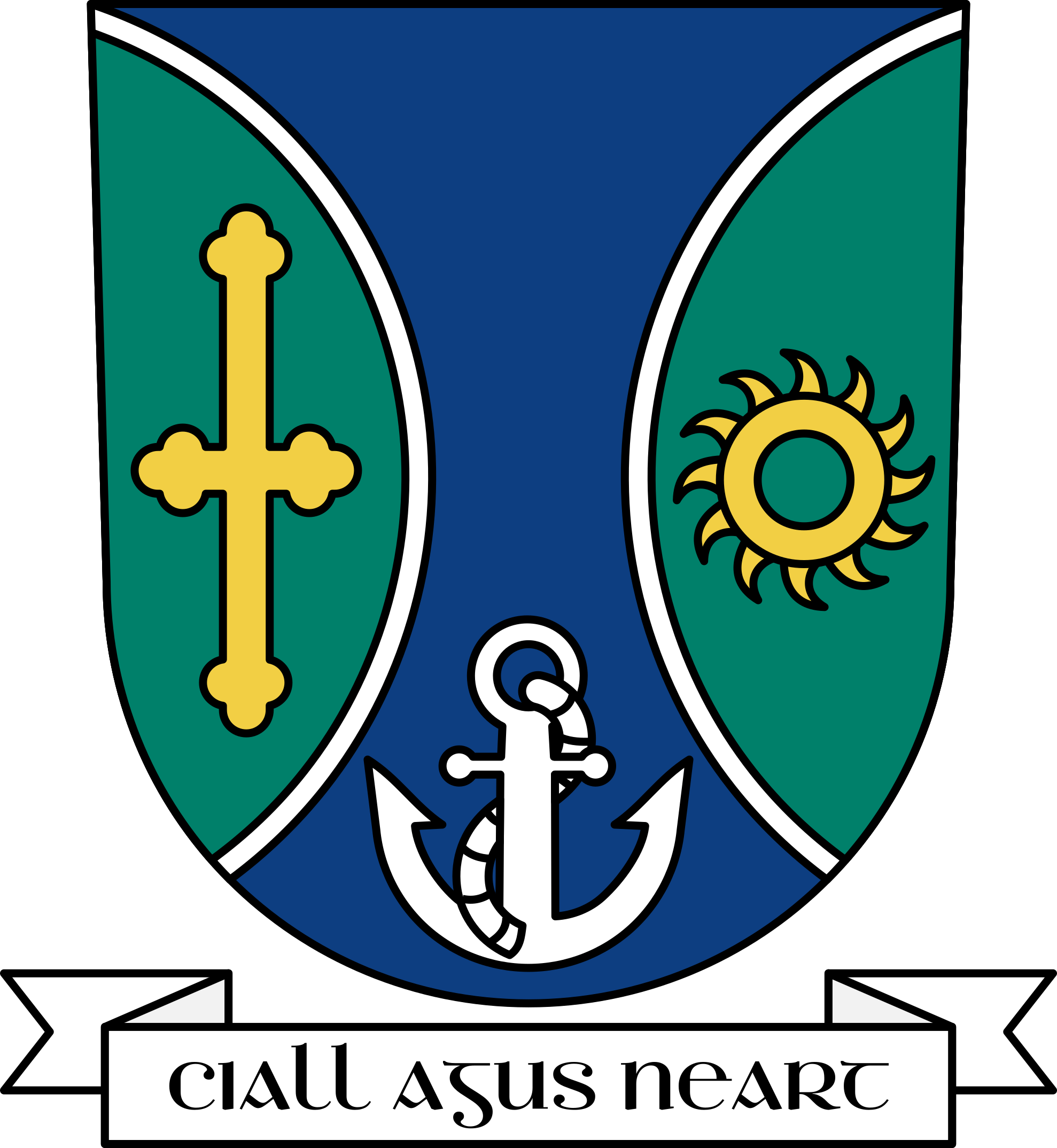
- Coat of arms

- Location in Ireland
- Coordinates: 52.640°N 9.486°W
- Country: Ireland
- Province: Munster
- County: County Clare

Population (2022)
  - Total: 2,649
- Time zone: UTC±0 (WET)
  - Summer (DST): UTC+1 (IST)
- Eircode routing key: V15
- Telephone area code: +353(0)65
- Irish Grid Reference: Q992554
- Website: www.kilrush.ie

Kilrush (Irish: Cill Rois, meaning 'Church of the Woods') is a coastal town in County Clare, Ireland. It is also the name of a civil parish and an ecclesiastical parish in Roman Catholic Diocese of Killaloe. It is located near the mouth of the River Shannon in the south-west of the county. Kilrush is one of the listed Heritage Towns of Ireland. The area was officially classified as part of the West Clare Gaeltacht, an Irish-speaking community, until 1956.

== History ==
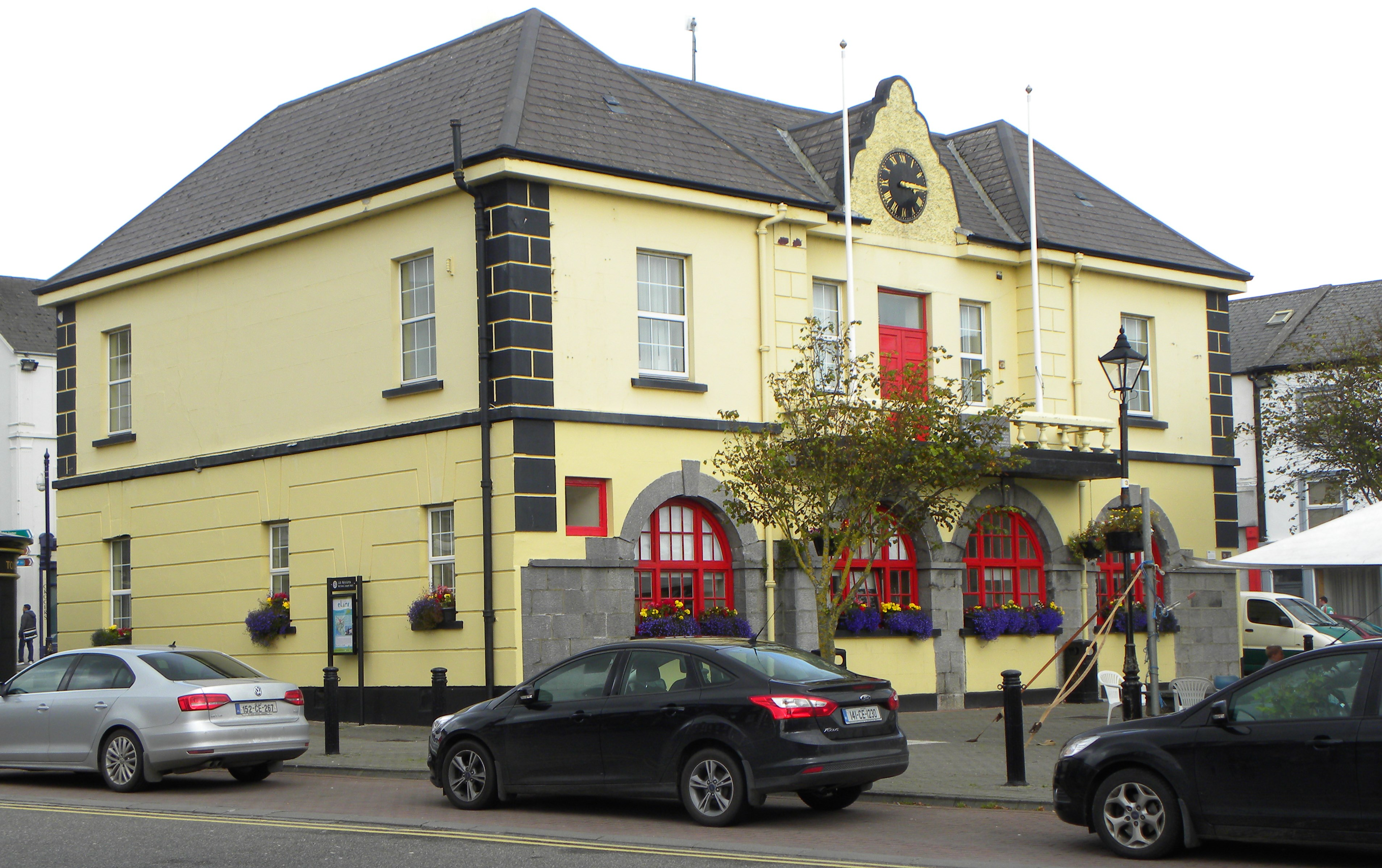
Kilrush Town Hall

Kilrush has existed since the 16th Century but an older church ruin at the local churchyard suggests a much older history. It is thought the name Cill Rois is derived from Church of the Wood, which would fit with the church ruins location.

Of Dutch origin, the Vandeleur family became the most prominent landlord family in West Clare. The Vandeleurs settled in the area, as tenants to the Earl of Thomond on land at Ballynote, Kilrush, in about 1656. Giles, the first Vandeleur in the area was the father of the Rev. John Vandeleur who was appointed prebend of Iniscathaigh in March 1687. He was buried at Kilrush in 1727. In 1749, John Vandeleur, son of the Rev. John, purchased lands in West Clare to the value of £9,826.0.6, from the fortune that had been acquired as one of the Commissioners for applotting quit rents in Ireland. It was not until the 18th century that the town underwent major development. This development coincided with the succession of John Ormsby Vandeleur as the wealthiest landlord in the district. He designed the layout of the town and many of the present-day street names derive from Vandeleur family names. John Ormsby Vandeleur also built the large family home, Kilrush House, in 1808.

John Ormsby Vandeleur owned much of Kilrush. With wealth achieved from a financially beneficial marriage and some political manoeuvring, he decided to develop the town. A Scots businessman James Paterson, who had been a gunboat lieutenant until 1802, assisted him in this project. Paterson entered the oats trade in west Clare and in 1802 he was given a site on the square from Vandeleur and erected a six-storey building. Buildings which Vandeleur commissioned included Kilrush Town Hall, completed in 1808.

The Napoleonic Wars (1799–1815) led to an improvement in agricultural prices. As Kilrush and the neighbouring countryside began to prosper, Hely Dutton reported in 1808 that the town was 'rising fast into some consequence'. He also acknowledged Paterson's role as a 'very active and intelligent inhabitant, who has been of the utmost benefit to Kilrush, and the adjoining counties'. In 1812 Paterson went into the shipping business and by 1817 he had a steamboat operating regularly between Limerick and Kilrush. The increasing popularity of Kilkee as a bathing resort brought many transit travellers to Kilrush.

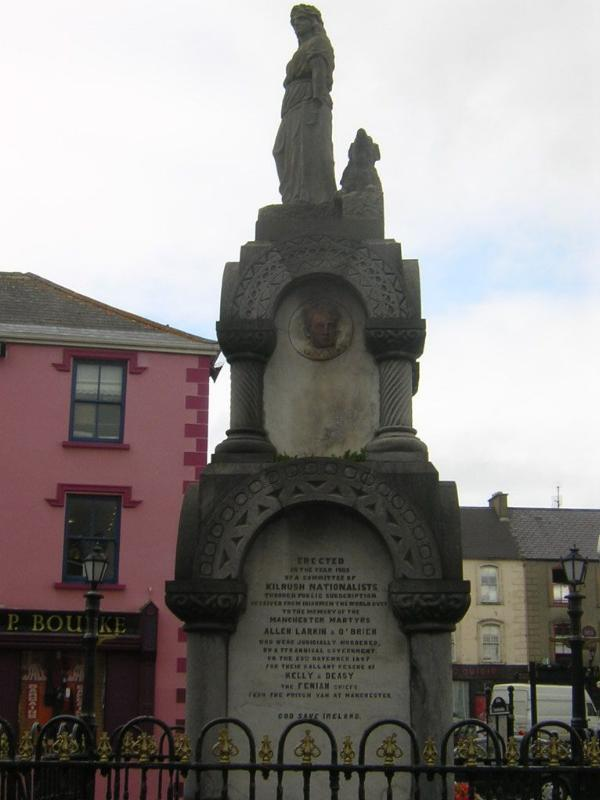
Monument to the Manchester Martyrs in the town

In 1837 Samuel Lewis described Kilrush as a seaport, market and post town. The main industries, chiefly for home consumption, were flannels, stockings and bundle cloth. The main trade was corn, butter, pigs, agricultural products and hides. There were works for refining rock salt for domestic use, a tan-yard, a soap factory and a nail factory. Branches of the national and agricultural banks had been opened in the town and a constabulary police force was also stationed there. A small prison was built in 1825 and a courthouse in 1831.

However, the famine years (1845–1849) brought much hardship to Kilrush. Famine, evictions, fever and cholera reduced the population of south-west Clare to such an extent that it never again attained its pre-famine numbers. This was later vividly dramatised in a radio programme. In the late 1880s, the Vandeleur name became synonymous with the worst of landlord evictions. The Kilrush workhouse witnessed terrible deprivation and deaths. By that stage, Hector Vandeleur was the lord of the manor.

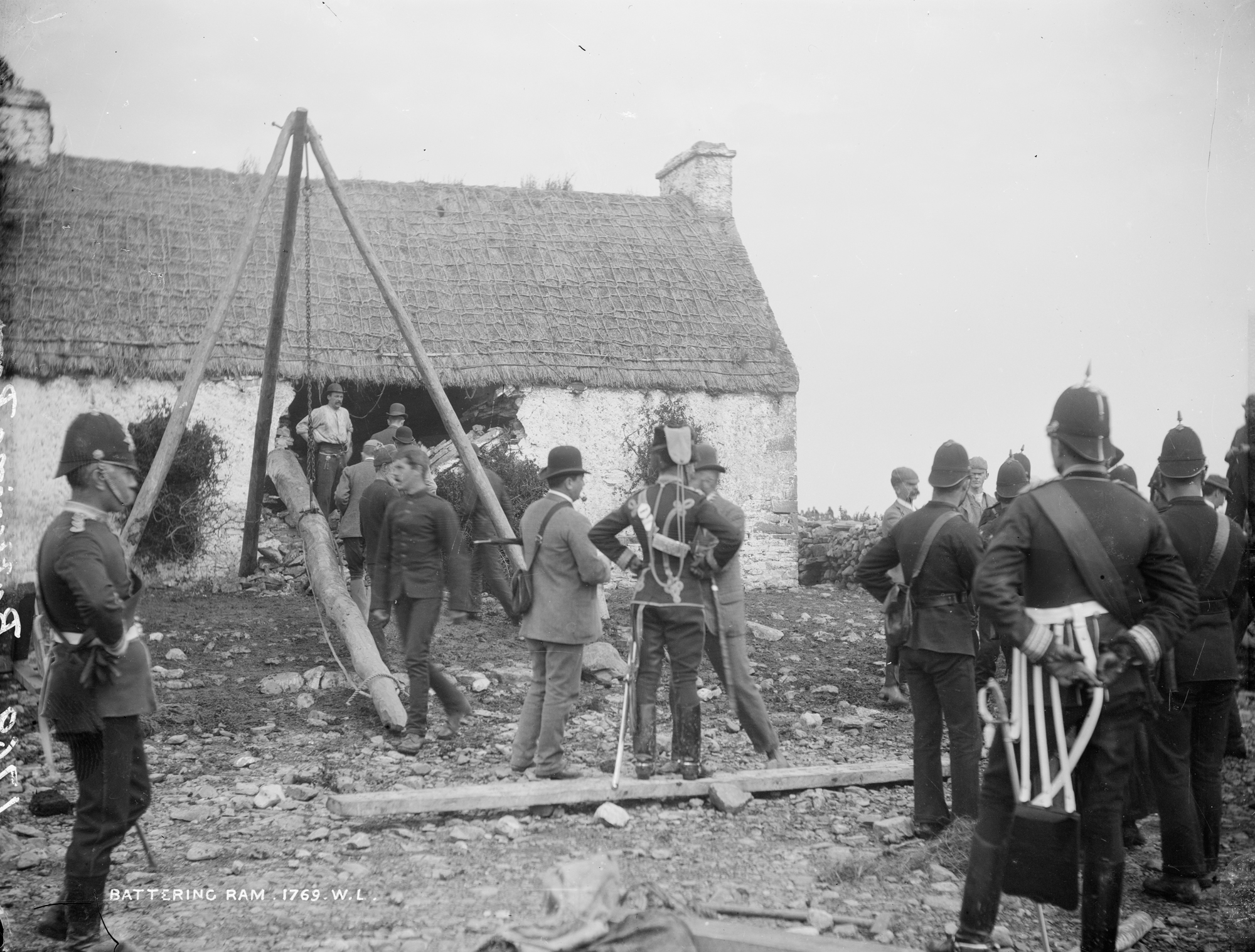
Irish Eviction Vandeleur estate-T.Birmingham's house, Moyasta, County Clare with Battering Ram and soldiers outside July 1888

Kilrush commercially survived the setbacks of the Great Famine to a great extent as a result of the arrival of the West Clare Railway towards the end of the 19th century, developed into a bustling market town. There is a 1500-year-old monastic settlement at Scattery Island in the Shannon estuary which is about 15 minutes from Kilrush by boat. The settlement was founded by St. Senan. It features one of the oldest and tallest round towers in Ireland.

== Kilrush today ==
The old port of Kilrush is now home to a 120 berth marina with automatic lock gate access to the Shannon Estuary, Scattery Island and the wild Atlantic Ocean. An impressive walled garden on the grounds of the old Vandeleur estate can still be visited today, though Kilrush House was gutted by fire in the late 19th century and finally demolished in the 1970s due to safety hazard. It stood where the main central car park now stands.

The nearby Moneypoint power station began construction in 1979 and was commissioned between 1985 and 1987. This brought a large economic boost to the town and wider region, with Moneypoint establishing itself as one of the primary employers in West Clare. However, due to a governmental climate change plan to cease burning coal in Moneypoint by 2025, electricity production has fallen massively, at times producing nothing. In 2019, it was announced that the workforce would be cut by more than half, raising fears for the economic health of the area.

The retail scene of Kilrush has changed massively in recent times, being almost unrecognizable to 2 decades previous. Large retailers such as Tesco (Opened 2008)) and Aldi (Opened 2009) have opened in the town, however a significant amount of smaller retailers have closed since the turn of the decade, almost decimating streets such as Moore Street.

Kilrush was the host venue for the 2013 National Famine Commemoration.

Offshore resides a large pod of Bottlenose dolphins who are resident year-round in the estuary. Dolphin-watching tour boats depart daily from the Kilrush marina, and the Shannon Dolphin and Wildlife Foundation has an information centre nearby.

Kilrush has been twinned with the town of Plouzané in Brittany, France since 1982.

In 2015, Kilrush won an Entente Florale gold medal, a European-wide horticultural and environmental competition. Kilrush represented Ireland in the 'Village' category of the competition for population centres of less than 5,000 people.

== Sport ==
=== Current sport ===
The town has an 18-hole golf course on the Ennis Road. The Western Yacht Club has in the last decades been rejuvenated, being one of the oldest yacht clubs in the world.

Tennis, football (soccer) and athletics are catered for at the Cooraclare Road complex (under age and junior clubs). The rugby club is based on the Doonbeg Road. Kilrush Shamrocks GAA Club is located on the Killimer Road. The ground, Captain Tubridy Memorial Park is traditionally called "The Cricket Field", since it was used for that sport during the 19th century. The club was founded in 1886 and has recorded 21 county titles. Kilrush is home to the West Clare Triathlon Club, a multi-discipline sports club, which trains and competes in the following sports – swimming, cycling and running.

Kilrush was the birthplace of a number of renowned sportspeople listed in the Notable People section below.

=== Former Sport ===
A short lived greyhound racing track operated from 1947 until 1950. A licence was granted on 1 October 1946 and the track opened on 31 May 1947, on the Cooraclare Road.

== Schools ==
Kilrush has two primary schools and one secondary school. St. Senans NS is an English speaking school, the other is an Irish speaking Gaelscoil, which is called Gaelscoil Uí Choimin. The secondary school is called Kilrush Community School.

== Transport ==
Kilrush is on the N67 (Galway – Tarbert) and N68 (Ennis – Kilrush). Kilrush is about 30 minutes drive from Ennis (40 km). Close by is a ferry between Killimer and Tarbert (County Kerry). The town is serviced by bus routes run by Bus Éireann and Clare Bus. The nearest airport is Shannon Airport.

Kilrush was once one of the twin termini of the West Clare Railway from Ennis, the neighbouring town of Kilkee being the other (see Irish railway history). The railway closed in 1961 but a short section of the railway has been re-opened at Moyasta as a tourist attraction. One of the original steam engines on the route, the Slieve Callan has been lovingly restored.

Kilrush Creek Marina is at the Atlantic Ocean end of the Shannon Estuary, with its lock gates providing protection from the tidal estuary.

== People ==
Historical population
Year	Pop.	±%
1821	3,465	—
1831	3,966	+14.5%
1841	5,071	+27.9%
1851	4,471	−11.8%
1861	4,593	+2.7%
1871	4,424	−3.7%
1881	3,805	−14.0%
1891	4,095	+7.6%
1901	4,179	+2.1%
1911	3,666	−12.3%
1926	3,345	−8.8%
1936	3,426	+2.4%
1946	3,351	−2.2%
1951	3,154	−5.9%
1956	3,000	−4.9%
1961	2,861	−4.6%
1966	2,734	−4.4%
1971	2,671	−2.3%
1981	2,753	+3.1%
1986	2,961	+7.6%
1991	2,740	−7.5%
1996	2,594	−5.3%
2002	2,699	+4.0%
2006	2,657	−1.6%
2011	2,695	+1.4%
2016	2,719	+0.9%
2022	2,649	−2.6%

- Lawrence 'Larry' Quinlivan Bulger (1870–1928), Irish rugby union player, athlete and doctor, and his older brothers and fellow sportsmen Michael Bulger (1867–1938) and Daniel Delany Bulger (1865–1930) were from Moore Street, Kilrush, where their father, Daniel Scanlan Bulger (1831–1904), was a woollen merchant and draper and ran a loan office.
- David Comyn (1854–1907) was an Irish language revivalist from Kilrush parish, where his name is commemorated in the title of Gaelscoil Uí Choimín
- Mrs. Elizabeth Crotty (née Markham) (1885–1960), concertina player, was from Gower near Kilrush, where she and her husband ran Crotty's pub on the Market Square.
- Thomas A. Cullinan (1838–1904), city marshal of Junction City, Kansas from 1871 to 1904, was born in Kilrush to well-to-do parents.
- Thomas Cusack (1858–1926), Chicago Democrat US Representative from Illinois 4th District, 1899–1901, was born in Kilrush.
- Colm de Bhailís (1796–1906), poet, songwriter and stonemason, travelled extensively throughout Ireland and is believed to have lived for some time in Kilrush.
- Joe Jacob (b. 1939), Fianna Fáil politician, was born in Kilrush.
- General Sir Thomas Kelly-Kenny GCB GCVO (1840–1914), son of Mathew Kelly Esq. D.L of Kilrush, was one of the most senior officers in the British Army as Adjutant-General to the British Forces.
- Sir Arthur Edward Kennedy GCMG CB (1809–1883) was Poor Law Inspector in Kilrush Poor Law Union, from November 1847 to September 1850.
- Charles Lever (1806–1872), novelist, briefly practised medicine in Kilrush as a young doctor, around the time of the 1832 Cholera epidemic. The character of Father Tom Loftus in Lever's novel Jack Hinton was based on Father Michael Comyn, Parish Priest of the nearby Kilkee and Killard parishes.
- Joe McDermott (b. 1940), professional golfer and winner of the Irish Senior Open in 1998, was born in Kilrush, where his parents Thomas and Annie McDermott ran a pub, shoeshop and Irish Hospitals' Sweepstake agency on the Market Square.
- Fr. John O'Brien (1931–2008), founder of the St. James's Choir, was born in Kilrush, where his father Michael O'Brien had a pub on the Market Square.
- Richard Barry O'Brien (1847–1918), historian, journalist, writer and biographer of Parnell, was born in Kilrush.
- Joe Riley (b. 1943) author of Ghosts of Kilrush, an autobiographical account of life in Kilrush in the 1940s.
- Michael Talty (1857–1957), head porter and guard in Kilrush on the West Clare Railway, has been immortalised by Percy French in the song Are Ye Right There Michael.
- Michael Tubridy (b. 1935), original member of The Chieftains, was born in Kilrush, and lived on O'Dea's Road.
- Captain Michael 'Mick' Tubridy (1923–1954), international showjumper and All Ireland winning footballer with Cork.
- The siblings and Irish Labour Party politicians, Pat Upton (1944–1999) and Mary Upton (b. 1946), were born in Kilrush.

== Civil parish ==
There are 40 townlands in Kilrush civil parish.

== See also ==
- List of towns and villages in Ireland
- List of RNLI stations
- Market Houses in Ireland
