= SSE Thermal =

British energy generation subsidiary

SSE Thermal Energy Operations Limited
- Company type: Private limited company
- Industry: Energy
- Founded: June 2020
- Headquarters: Reading, England, UK
- Area served: United Kingdom; Ireland
- Services: Power generation
- Number of employees: 600
- Parent: SSE plc
- Website: www.ssethermal.com

SSE Thermal is the thermal power generation subsidiary of British company SSE plc.

== Overview ==
SSE Thermal operates several thermal power stations across the United Kingdom and Ireland that provide electricity to the National Grid and EirGrid respectively. It operated Ferrybridge 'C 'power station and Fiddlers Ferry power station until 2016 and 2020 respectively, SSE having decided in 2017 to end its UK coal power generation. It now focuses on generation of electricity from waste and natural gas.

== Endesa Ireland acquisition ==
In 2010, SSE announced that it would purchase Endesa Generation's Irish power generation business for €320 million in cash plus an estimated €43 million for working capital. Endesa Ireland's assets included plants in operation, under construction and with consent for development.

The deal included four operating plants: the 620 MW fuel oil Tarbert Power Station in County Kerry; the 240 MW fuel oil Great Island Power Station in County Wexford; the 104 MW peaking gas oil Tawnaghmore Power Station in County Mayo; and the 104 MW peaking gas oil Rhode Power Station in County Offaly.

A 460 MW CCGT plant was at the time under construction at Great Island, and was commissioned in 2014, when the older 240 MW fuel oil unit was decommissioned. SSE invested €125 million over three years to complete construction of the plant.

The acquisitions also included three options for the future development of power generation plants in Ireland. These are a proposed 450 MW CCGT plant at Tarbert, which received full planning permission in 2010; a development site at Lanesboroin, County Longford, and a development site at Shannonbridge, County Offaly.

== Current operations ==
United Kingdom

- Keadby Power Stations
- Marchwood Power Station
- Medway Power Station
- Peterhead Power Station
- Seabank Power Station
- Chickerell Power Station
- Burghfield Power Station
- Saltend Power Station
- Indian Queens Power Station
- Deeside Power Station

Ireland

- Great Island Power Station
- Rhode Power Station
- Tawnaghmore Power Station
- Tarbert Power Station

== Former operations ==
- Fiddlers Ferry power station – operated from 2004 until the plant's closure in 2020.
- Ferrybridge 'C' power station – operated until closure in 2016.
