= Killimer (parish) =

- Roman Catholic parish
- Location in Ireland
- Coordinates: 52°37′0.74″N 9°23′24.74″W
- Country: Ireland
- Province: Munster
- County: County Clare
- Time zone: UTC+0 (WET)
  - Summer (DST): UTC-1 (IST (WEST))

Killimer, also known as Killimer and Knockerra, is a parish in County Clare, Ireland, and part of the Inis Cathaigh grouping of parishes within the Roman Catholic Diocese of Killaloe.

As of 2022, the co-parish priest is Pat Larkin.

Originally, in medieval times, Killimer was a separate parish. However, it was later amalgamated into the parish of Kilrush. In 1848 it became a parish in its own right again, but much larger than the medieval parish.

== Churches ==
The two churches of the parish were built in the time that it was still part of Kilrush.

The main church of the parish is the Church of St. Senan in the townland Knockerra. The original church here was built in 1832 under leadership of Fr. John Kenny. It serves as parish church till 1959, when it was deemed unsafe. It was demolished and a new church was built. The new church was completed in 1961.

The second church of the parish is St. Imy's Church in Killimer. This church was built in 1840. It is a simple cruciform church but with a larger transept than the right one. This is due to a school built against that transept that was later incorporated into the church.

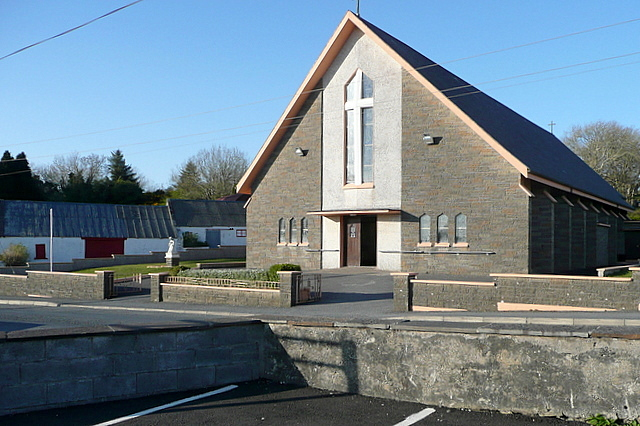
Church of St. Senan, Knockerra

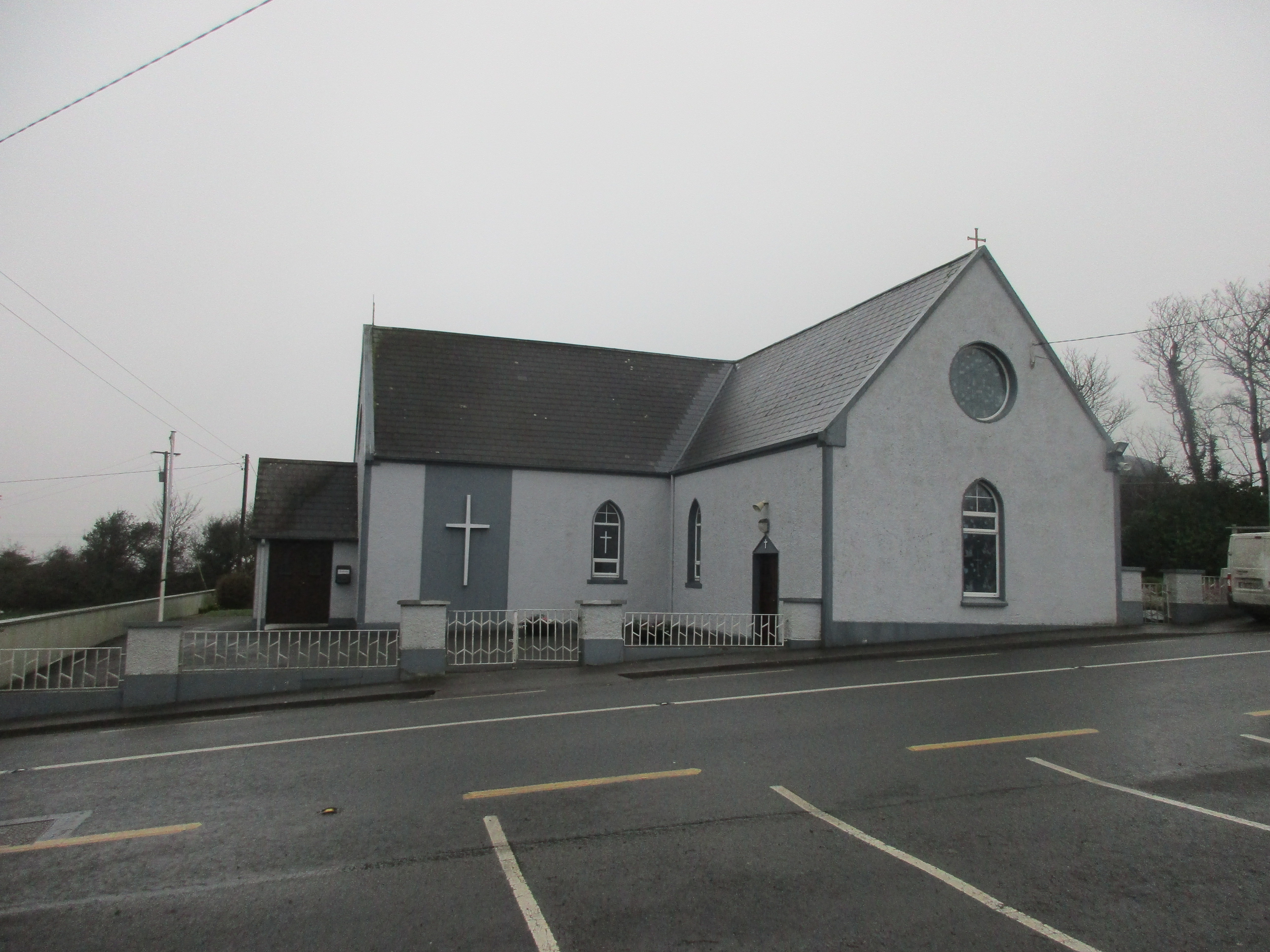
St. Imy's Church, Killimer

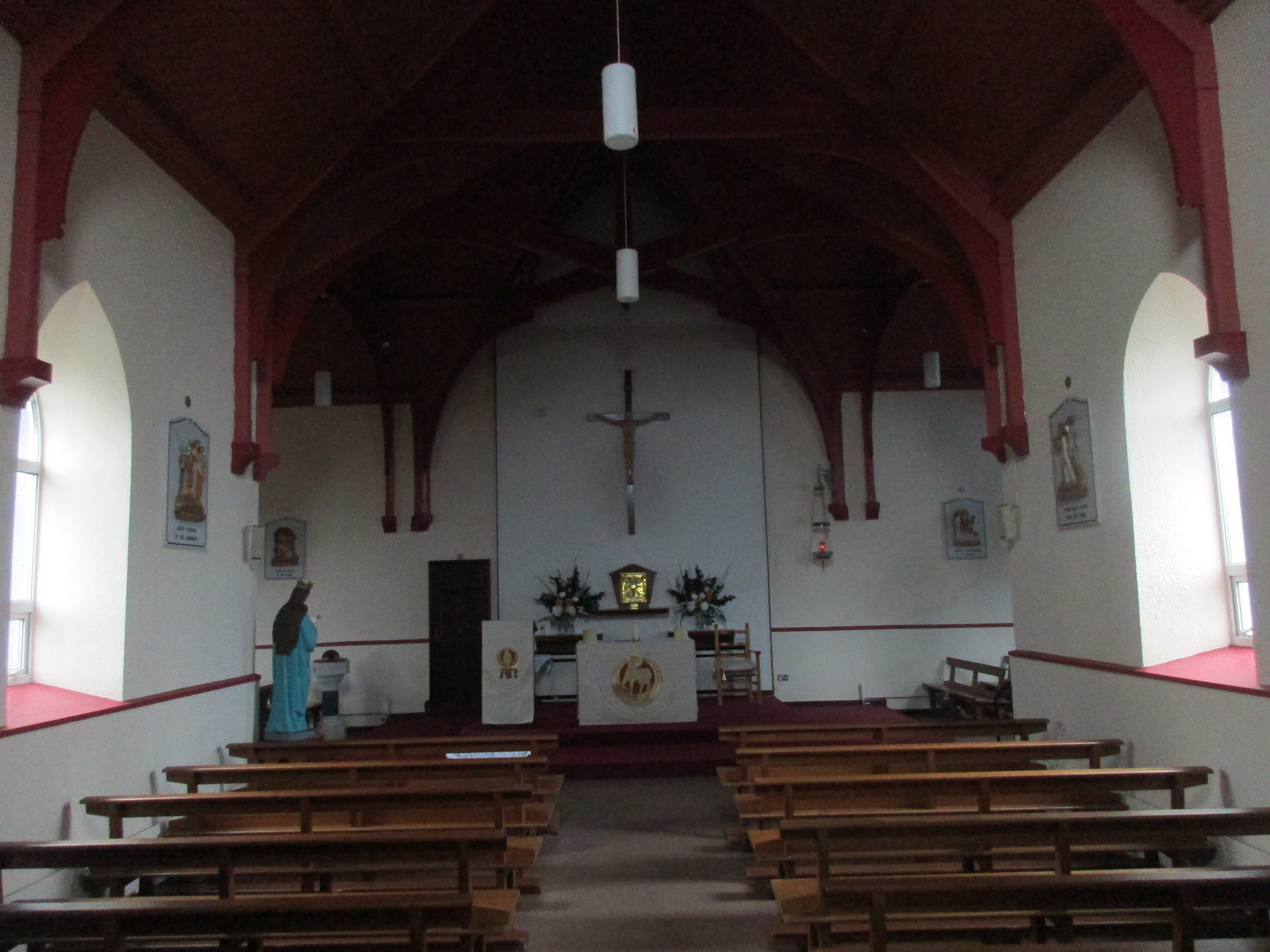
Altar of S. Imy's Church

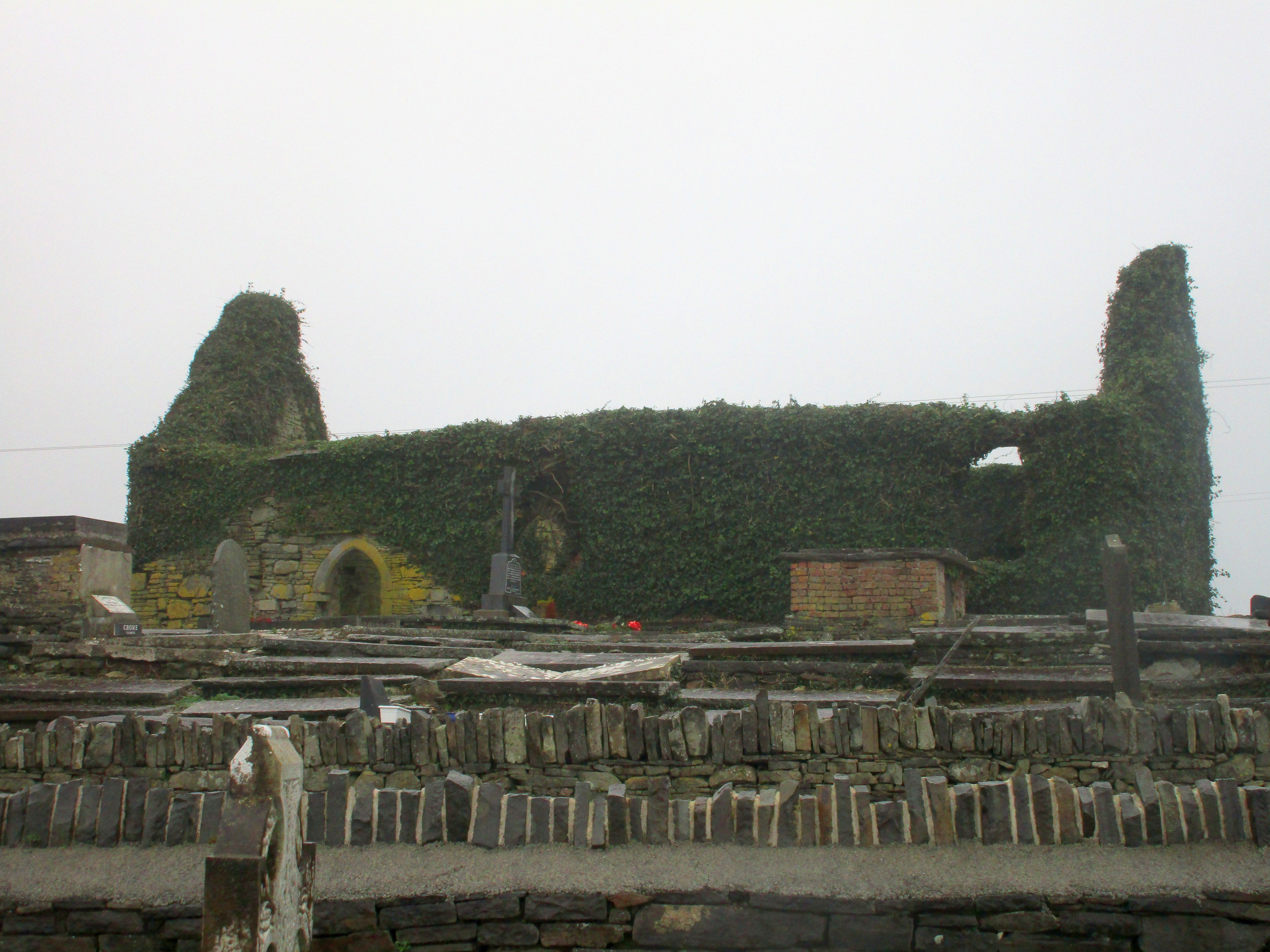
The medieval church of Killimer
