= N67 road (Ireland) =

National Secondary road in the Republic of Ireland

N67 road
- Bóthar N67
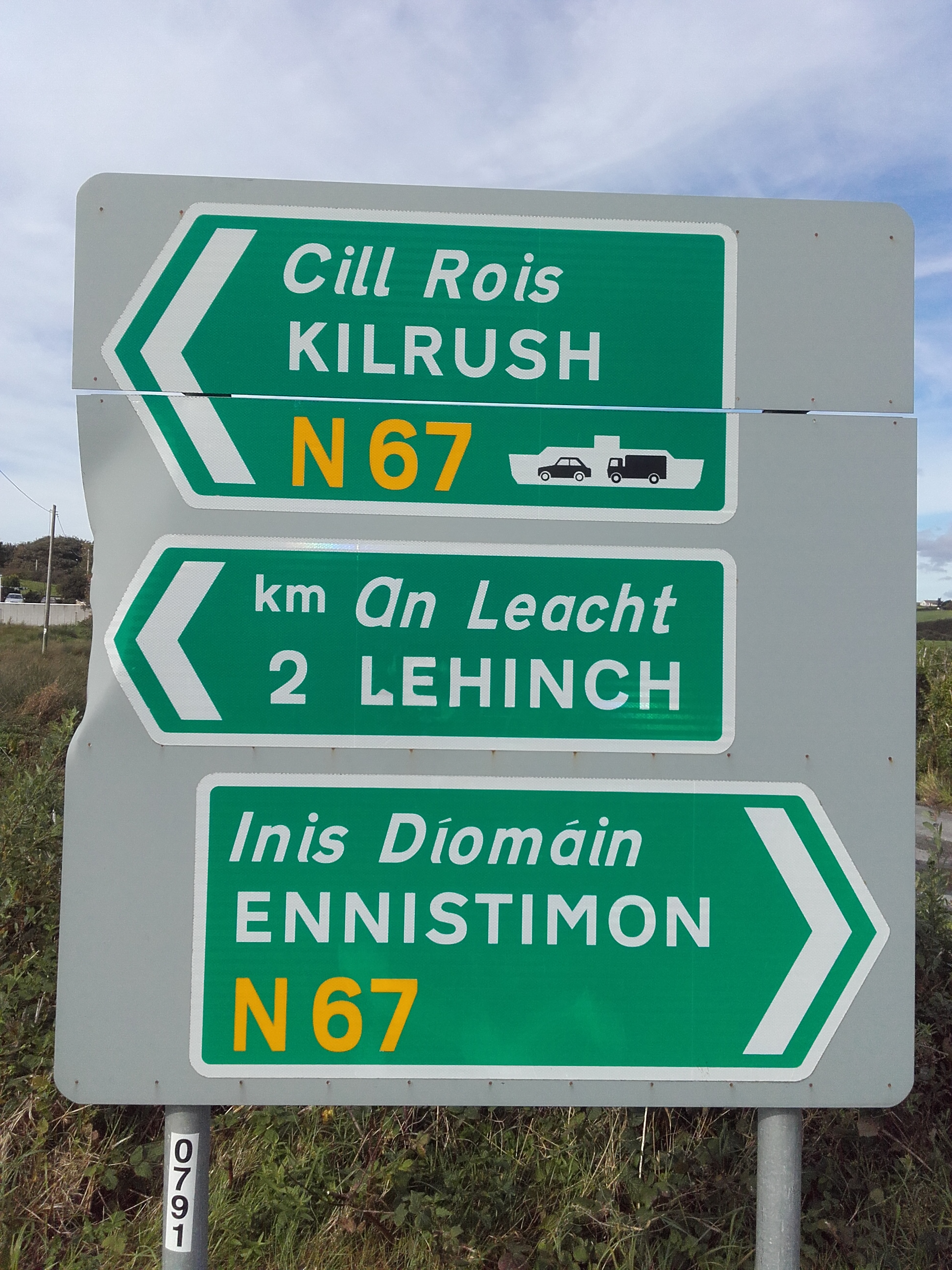
- N67 road sign

Route information
- Length: 143 km (89 mi)

Location
- Country: Ireland
- Primary destinations: County Galway; Galway; Oranmore; Clarinbridge; Kilcolgan; Ballinderreen; Kinvara; County Clare; Ballyvaughan; Lisdoonvarna; Kilshanny; Ennistymon; Lahinch; Miltown Malbay; Quilty; Doonbeg; Kilkee; Moyasta; Kilrush; Killimer; Shannon Ferry; County Kerry; Tarbert

Highway system
- Roads in Ireland; Motorways; Primary; Secondary; Regional

The N67 road is a national secondary road in Ireland. It runs from Galway to Tarbert and passes through Oranmore, Clarinbridge, Kinvara, Ballyvaughan, Lisdoonvarna, Ennistymon, Lahinch, Milltown Malbay, Quilty, Doonbeg, Kilkee, Moyasta, Kilrush and Killimer. At Killimer, vehicle traffic is carried by the Shannon Ferry to Tarbert on the southern side of the Shannon Estuary.

== See also ==
- Roads in Ireland
- Motorways in Ireland
- National primary road
- Regional road
