= Ferrybridge power stations =

Three coal-fired power stations in West Yorkshire, England

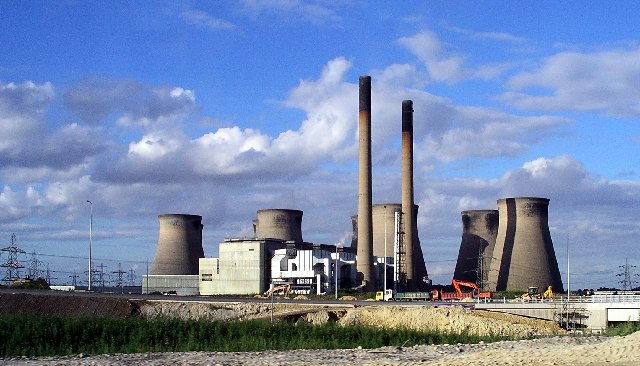
- Ferrybridge C Power Station; Viewed from the west in August 2005
- Country: England
- Location: Knottingley, West Yorkshire
- Coordinates: 53.71740°N 1.28058°W
- Status: Operational
- Construction began: A station: 1926; B station: 1955; C station: 1961; Multifuel 1: 2011; Multifuel 2: 2016
- Commission date: A station: 1927; B station: 1957; C station: 1966; Multifuel 1: 2015; Multifuel 2: 2019
- Decommission date: A station: 1976; B station: 1992; C station: 2016
- Operators: West Yorkshire Power Company (1927–1948); British Electricity Authority (1948–1954); Central Electricity Authority (1954–1957); Central Electricity Generating Board (1957–1990); Powergen (1990–1999); Edison Mission Energy (1999–2001); AEP Energy Services Ltd (2001–2004); SSE plc (2004–2016); Multifuel Energy (2016–)

Thermal power station
- Primary fuel: Coal
- Secondary fuel: Biomass
- Tertiary fuel: Gas

Power generation
- Nameplate capacity: A station: 125 MW; B station: 300 MW; C station: 2,034 MW; Multifuel 1: 68 MW

External links
- Website: www.sse.com/Ferrybridge/
- Commons: Related media on Commons

The Ferrybridge power stations were three coal-fired power stations on the River Aire near Ferrybridge in West Yorkshire, England, in operation from 1927 to 2016 on a site next to the junction of the M62 and A1(M) motorways.

The first station, Ferrybridge A, was constructed in the mid-1920s and closed in 1976. Ferrybridge B was brought into operation in the 1950s and closed in the early 1990s.

In 1966, Ferrybridge C power station was opened with a generating capacity of 2000 MW. It had been constructed and was then operated by the Central Electricity Generating Board (CEGB). After privatisation in 1989 ownership was passed to Powergen, then to Edison Mission Energy (1999), then to AEP Energy Services (American Electric Power) (2001) and finally to SSE plc (2004). In 2009 two of the four units were fitted with flue-gas desulphurisation (FGD) plant. In 2013 SSE indicated that the power station would not comply with the Industrial Emissions Directive, requiring the plant's closure by 2023 or earlier. It was later announced that the plant would be fully closed by March 2016.

Ferrybridge Multifuel 1 is a 68 MW multi-fuel energy-from-waste plant at the site which became operational in 2015. Ferrybridge Multifuel 2 is a 70 MW multi-fuel plant built alongside the MF1 plant, which became operational in 2019.

On 28 July 2019, one of Ferrybridge's cooling towers was demolished, followed by a further four on 13 October. The main boiler house, bunker bay and two chimney stacks were demolished on 22 August 2021. The final three cooling towers were demolished on 17 March 2022.

== Ferrybridge A (1917–1976) ==
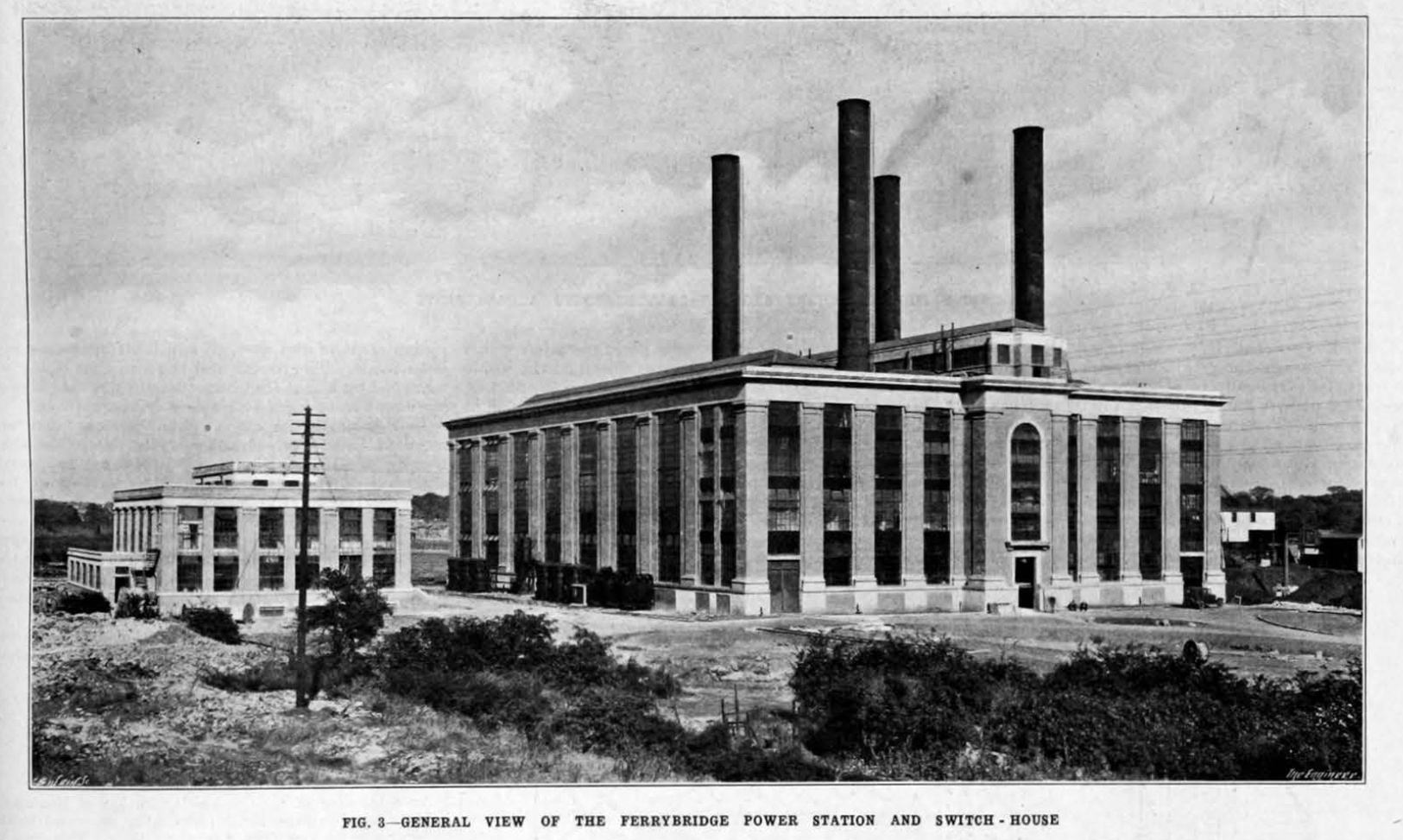
Ferrybridge main building and switchgear house (c.1927)

Land at Ferrybridge was purchased by the Yorkshire Electric Power Company in 1917. Plans for a power station were prepared and submitted to the Board of Trade in March 1918. Because of a system change the following year with the Electricity (Supply) Act 1919 (9 & 10 Geo. 5. c. 100), the plans were put on hold. The plans were resubmitted to the Electricity Commissioners in January 1920. The plans were finally granted permission in November 1921, but delayed by a supply area reshuffle. A 135 acres (55 ha) site was chosen with good access to coal, water, and good transport links including water transport.

Construction of Ferrybridge A power station began in 1926 and the station began operating in 1927. The initial station covered 32 acres (13 ha) of the site. The main buildings contained the boilers, turbines, and offices and workshops, and a smaller building housed the electrical switchgear. Transport facilities included sidings connected to the Dearne Valley line with equipment for handling wagons up to 20 t, and a river wharf for transport by barge. Wagon unloading was by a side tipper, into an automated weigher and then conveyors, and barge unloading was by a crane into the weighing machine. The cooling water intakes were 550 ft (170 m) upstream of the wharves, initially with two filtered intakes with a minimum capacity (low water) of 3,000,000 imp gal (14,000 m^{3}) of water per hour.

The power generating equipment included eight 75,000 lb (34,000 kg) per hour water boiling capacity water tube boilers arranged in pairs, sharing air draught and chimneys (166 ft (51 m) height). The boilers were designed to produce superheated steam at 315 psi (21.4 atm) at 700 °F (371 °C) The turbine/generator section had two 3,000 rpm three stage reaction turbines driving alternators rated at 19 MW continuous. The alternators produced 50 Hz 3 phase AC at 11 kV, which was stepped up to 33 kV by two sets of three single phase transformers rated at 25 MW per set.

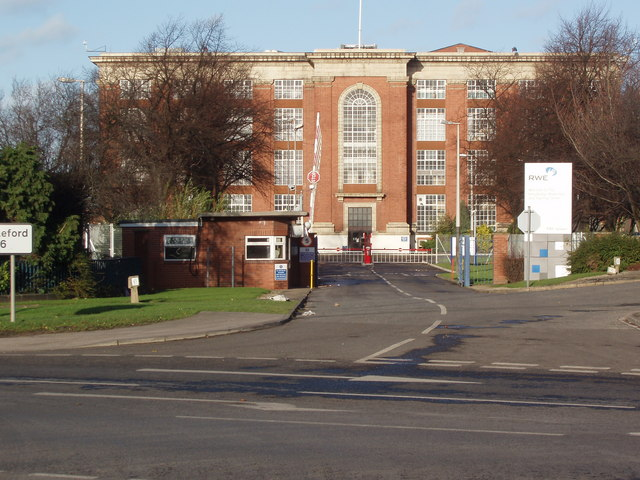
The main building of Ferrybridge A converted for use as workshops by RWE npower (2006)

The station passed into the ownership of the British Electricity Authority on the nationalisation of the UK's power industry, with the Electricity Act 1947 (10 & 11 Geo. 6. c. 54). This company in turn became the Central Electricity Authority in 1954. The annual electricity output of the A station was:

Electricity output of Ferrybridge A
Year	1946	1960–1	1961–2	1962–3	1966-7
Electricity supplied, GWh	468.151	541.1	545.7	549.0	485.2

The station closed on 25 October 1976, at which point it had a generating capacity of 125 MW.

Ferrybridge A's boiler room and turbine hall still stand today. The buildings are now used as offices and workshops, by the RWE npower Technical Support Group, who are responsible for the maintenance and repairs of power station plant from around the country.

== Ferrybridge B (1957–1992) ==
Ferrybridge B Power Station with a capacity of 300MW was commissioned between 1957 and 1959. It was constructed on a site that was purchased by the Yorkshire Electric Power Company in 1918. At that time the land was flooded and was used for growing willows when basket making was a thriving local industry. Before construction of the station the level of the site was raised above flood level by ash from Ferrybridge “A” power station. The station contained three 100 MW Parsons turbo-alternators and two Stirling and one Babcock & Wilcox boilers, with steam conditions at the turbine stop valve of 1500 psi. and 975 deg F with reheat to 955 deg F at 432 psi. Coal was delivered by rail or barge from the River Aire. Cooling water for the condensers is obtained from the River Aire but this couldn't provide sufficient levels three cooling towers were also constructed.

The station originally had a total generating capacity of 300 MW, but by the 1990s this was recorded as 285 MW. Ferrybridge B was one of the CEGB's twenty steam power stations with the highest thermal efficiency; in 1963–4 the thermal efficiency was 32.34 per cent, 31.98 per cent in 1964–5, and 31.96 per cent in 1965–6. The annual electricity output of Ferrybridge B was:

Electricity output of Ferrybridge B
Year	1959–60	1960–1	1961–2	1962–3	1963–4	1964–5	1965–6	1966-7	1971–2	1978–9	1981–2
Electricity supplied, GWh	1,484	2,029	1,954	1,921	2,065	2,014	1,912	2,009	1,719	1,258	1,651

After the UK's electric supply industry was privatised in 1990, the station was operated by PowerGen. The station closed in 1992 and has since been completely demolished.

In 2006 LaFarge began construction of a plasterboard factory adjacent to the Ferrybridge C power station on the site of the former Ferrybridge B station to use the Calcium Sulphate (Gypsum) produced by FGD.

== Ferrybridge C (1966–2016) ==
=== CEGB period (1966–1989) ===
The power station was originally built for and operated by the Central Electricity Generating Board.

==== Construction ====
Work began on Ferrybridge C in 1961. The architects were the Building Design Partnership. There were two chimneys and the eight cooling towers were arranged in a lozenge pattern on side of the building.

==== Cooling towers collapse ====
On 1 November 1965, three of the cooling towers collapsed due to vibrations from Kármán turbulence in 85 mph (137 km/h) winds. The remaining five were severely damaged.

A committee of enquiry concluded that although the structures had been built to withstand higher wind speeds, the design only considered average wind speeds over one minute for a solitary tower and neglected shorter gusts. Furthermore, the grouped shape of the cooling towers meant that westerly winds were funnelled into the towers themselves, creating a vortex. It noted that they had been built to a lower standard than previous towers on the site and only to standard with no safety margin. The committee carried out extensive testing with models. . The destroyed towers were rebuilt to a higher specification and the five surviving towers were strengthened to tolerate adverse weather conditions.

==== Commissioning ====
Commissioning of Ferrybridge C began in 1966: one unit was brought on line, feeding electricity into the National Grid, on 27 February 1966. Units 2, 3 and 4 were all commissioned by the end of 1967. Following the cooling tower accident, it was planned that the station would not be opened for some time after the scheduled date. However it was possible to connect one of the remaining towers to the now complete Unit 1. The reconstruction of the destroyed towers began in April 1966 and had been completed by 1968.

==== Specification ====
Ferrybridge C Power Station had four 500 MW generating sets known as units 1–4. There were four boilers rated at 435 kg/s, steam conditions were 158.58 bar at 566/566 °C reheat. In addition to the main generating sets the plant originally had four gas turbines with a combined capacity of 68 MW. Two were retired in the late 1990s reducing capacity to 34 MW. These units are used to start the plant in the absence of an external power supply.

The generating capacity, electricity output and thermal efficiency were as shown in the table.

Ferrybridge C
Year	Net capability, MW	Electricity supplied, GWh	Load as per cent of capability, %	Thermal efficiency, %
1966/7	357	201	27.0	28.07
1971/2	2000	7,340	44.0	33.94
1978/9	1932	11,721	69.3	34.85
1981/2	1932	10,229	60.4	36.51

Coal supply was by rail transport (initially 4m. tons a year in 1,000-ton Merry-go-round trains at the rate of 17 a day) and road transport and barge (initially 1m. tons on the Aire and Calder Navigation). Barge transport ended in the late 1990s. Another source mentions that the last time the barge unloader operated was on 17 December 2002 Rail transport comprised a branch off the adjacent Swinton and Milford Junction line. Facilities include a west-facing junction on the Swinton line, two coal discharge lines (No. 1 track and No. 2 track), gross- and tare-weight weighbridges, a hopper house, together with an oil siding. The automatic unloading equipment for the coal trains was built by Rhymney Engineering, a Powell Duffryn company. It used ultrasonic detection, capable of dealing with up to 99 wagons in a train (though initially trains had 35 hopper wagons), to control the door-opening gear to empty 5 wagons at a time into the bunkers.

The plant's two chimneys were 198 m (650 ft) high. The eight cooling towers were built to a height of 115 m (377 ft), none of which remain at the site after the final demolition of the cooling towers on 17 March 2022.

=== Post-privatisation (1989–2016) ===
Ownership passed to Powergen (1989) after the privatisation of the Central Electricity Generating Board. In 1998, during the 1990s "dash for gas", Powergen closed Unit 4. In 1999 the power station, along with Fiddlers Ferry in Cheshire, was sold to Edison Mission Energy. Both stations were then sold on to AEP Energy Services Ltd (American Electric Power) in 2001, before both were sold again to SSE plc in July 2004 for £136 million.

In 2005, SSE took the decision to fit Flue Gas Desulphurisation (FGD) to the plant, installing equipment to scrub half of Ferrybridge's output; the decision was required to partially meet the specifications of the Large Combustion Plant Directive (LCPD). In 2008 the boilers were fitted with Boosted Over Fire Air in order to reduce the NOx emissions. In 2009 FGD was commissioned on Units 3 and 4. The installation of FGD allowed SSE to sign a five-year agreement with UK Coal for 3.5 million tonnes of higher-sulphur coal.

In December 2013, SSE announced that Ferrybridge would opt out from (not comply with) the EU Industrial Emissions Directive (2010/75/EU); this would require the plant to close by the end of 2023, or on completing 17,500 hours of operation after 1 January 2016. The units without FGD (1 and 2) were closed on 28 March 2014, having completed the 20,000 operating hours permitted under the LCPD.

=== Ferrybridge C fire, 31 July 2014 ===
On 31 July 2014 a serious fire broke out in Ferrybridge Unit C. The fire was understood to have started in the fourth generating unit, with the no.3 unit also affected. Neither unit was operational at the time of the fire, due to maintenance. At its height some 75 firefighters tackled 100 ft (30m) high flames, after the blaze broke out at about 14:00 BST. A plant used to remove sulphur dioxide from gases produced from the power station caught fire. The black smoke coming from the coal-fired power station affected nearby roads, including the M62, with drivers and householders advised to keep windows shut. No injuries were recorded as the site was quiet due to the summer shutdown. The fire resulted in a partial collapse of the structure.

As the fire was in the absorber tower, it destroyed Unit 4's FGD capability. Unit 3, which had received minor damage, returned to service on 29 October 2014. Unit 4 resumed service on 15 December 2014, although without its FGD it could only run by burning very low sulphur coal and in tandem with Unit 3. The very low sulphur coal ran out in March 2015 and therefore Unit 4 was shut, leaving only Unit 3 in operation for the final year of generation.

=== Closure ===
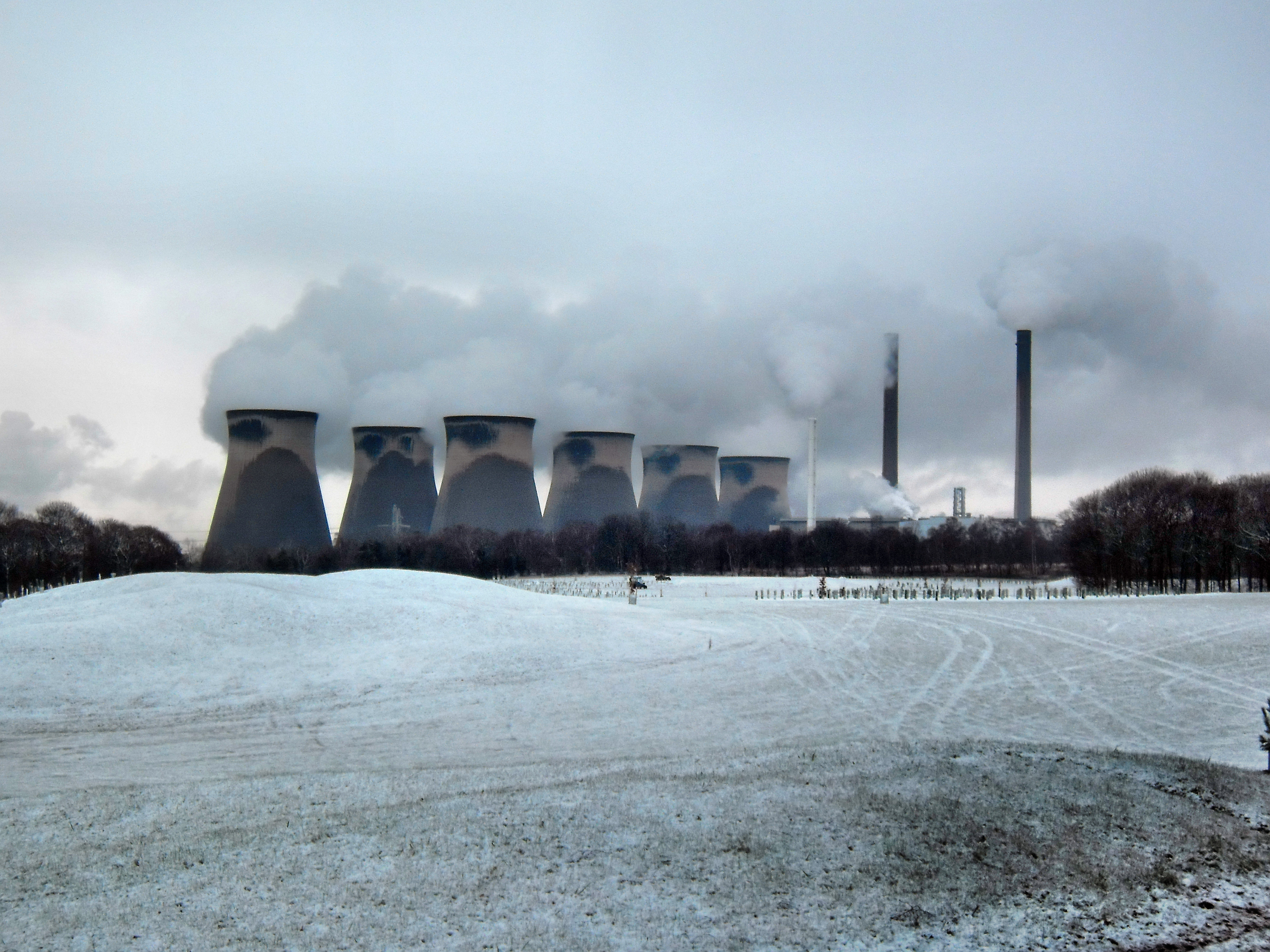
Ferrybridge C in March 2016, just before its closure

After the fire, only Unit 3 remained in full operation causing energy output to decrease and leading to a rise in the cost of running it. In May 2015 SSE confirmed that the plant would close in early 2016, after estimating that it would lose £100 million over the next five years. Electricity generation ceased around midday on 23 March 2016, with SSE stating that the official closure date would be 31 March.

=== Demolition ===
Cooling Tower 6 stood 114 metres (374 ft) high and was the first to be demolished, using explosives on 28 July 2019. A further four cooling towers were demolished on 13 October 2019, leaving three standing.

The main boiler house, bunker bay and two 198-metre (650 ft) high chimney stacks were demolished on 22 August 2021. All were demolished at the same time because when a controlled demolition takes place there has to be an exclusion zone for safety. There is a housing development near the power station and during the COVID-19 restrictions, Keltbray and SSE were not allowed to evacuate the houses while social distancing guidelines required households to be 2 metres (6ft) apart. Once the restrictions were lifted they were able to carry out the demolition, and chose to demolish the three structures at the same time so that only one evacuation was necessary.

The final three cooling towers, at first intended to be kept for a future gas-fired power station, were demolished on 17 March 2022 and the site was offered for sale. The power station demolition was completed in October 2022.

== Ferrybridge D (not built) ==
In 2018, SSE had plans to redevelop the site for a gas-fired power station, to be named Ferrybridge D, and build a 9km gas pipeline to connect it to the gas transmission system. Parts of 'C' station – including three of the original cooling towers, the electricity switch house and the substation – were going to be retained for its use. The plans were not taken forward, and in April 2020 the application to reserve capacity on the gas transmission network was cancelled.

== Ferrybridge Multifuel (2011–present) ==
In October 2011, SSE was granted Section 36 planning permission to construct a 68 MW waste-to-energy plant at its Ferrybridge site. The 68 MW plant was designed to burn mixed fuel including biomass, general waste and waste wood. The plant became operational during 2015.

In late 2013 consultations began for a second multifuel plant "Ferrybridge Multifuel 2" (FM2). The plant was initially specified to be similar in scale to the first plant, and to have a capacity of up to 90 MW. It occupied part of the course at Ferrybridge Golf Club, and in 2013 SSE undertook to provide a replacement nine-hole course and clubhouse nearby. Construction of MF2 began in 2016, was completed late 2019, and it was commissioned in December of that year. A rail unloading terminal was built between the two plants to allow both to be rail served.

Both plants were built by Multifuel Energy Limited, a 50:50 joint venture between SSE and Wheelabrator, a division of American company Waste Management. As of 2015, generated power was purchased by SSE. SSE sold its share of the joint venture to First Sentier Investors in January 2021, as part of a programme of disposal of non-core assets. A 150 MW / 300 MWh (2-hour) battery started construction in 2023, scheduled for 2024.

== Ferrybridge Carbon Capture Plant ==
On 30 November 2011, the Secretary of State for Energy and Climate Change, Chris Huhne, officially opened a carbon capture pilot plant at Ferrybridge Power Station. The carbon capture plant was constructed in partnership with Doosan Power Systems, Vattenfall and the Technology Strategy Board. The plant had a capacity of 100 tonnes of CO_{2} per day, equivalent to 0.005 GW of power. The capture method used amine chemistry (see Amine gas treating). The CO_{2} was not stored, because the pilot plant was designed only to test the carbon capture element of the carbon capture and storage process. At the time of construction it was the largest carbon capture plant in the UK.

== See also ==
- Listed buildings in Knottingley and Ferrybridge
- Aire valley power stations

Preceded by Blyth Power Station	Largest Power Station in the UK; 1966–1968	Succeeded by Ratcliffe-on-Soar Power Station
