= Kilrush (parish) =

Parish in County Clare, Ireland

- Catholic parish
- Location within Ireland
- Coordinates: 52°38′24″N 9°29′9.6″W
- Country: Ireland
- Province: Munster
- County: County Clare
- Time zone: UTC+0 (WET)
  - Summer (DST): UTC-1 (IST (WEST))

Kilrush is a parish in County Clare, Ireland, and part of the Inis Cathaigh grouping of parishes within the Roman Catholic Diocese of Killaloe.

Recent co-parish priests based in Kilrush have been Pat Larkin (2019-25); Michael Collins (2025-26) and Francis Xavier Kochuveettil from 2026.

== Churches ==
There are two churches in the parish.

The main church is the Church of St. Senan in Toler Street in Kilrush. It was built in 1839-1840 and replaced an older slated chapel that was located in High Street. That chapel in turn replaced a thatched cabin used as chapel.

The second church of the parish was the Church of Little Senan in Monmore. This a chapel built in 1895-1896 in a rectangular shape. It fell out of use after the COVID-19 pandemic.

== gallery ==
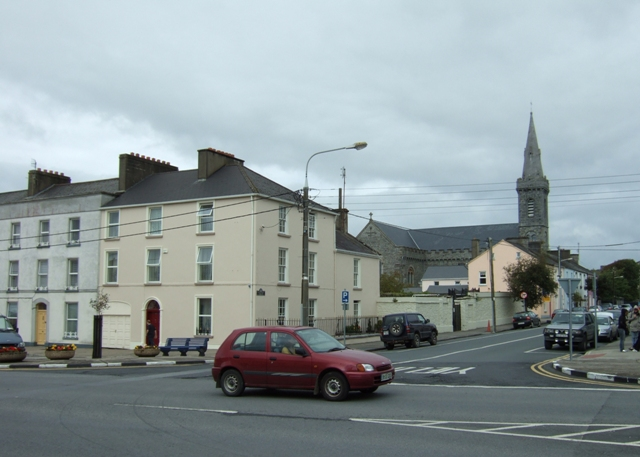
Toler Street with church

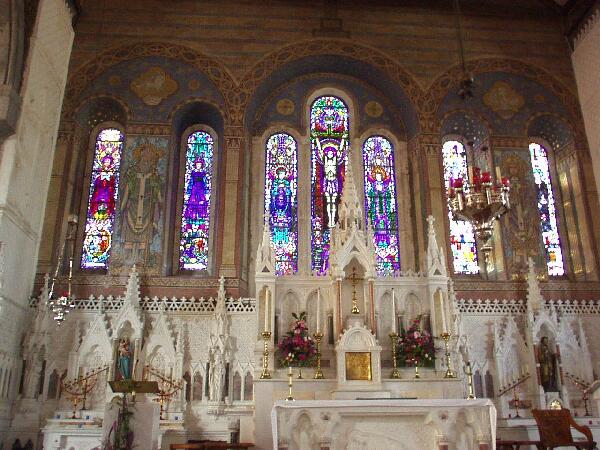
Church of St. Senan - altar
