= John O'Brien (priest) =

Irish Roman Catholic priest and musician

John O'Brien
- Born: 30 May 1931; Kilrush, County Clare, Ireland
- Died: 6 January 2008 (aged 76); Finglas, Dublin, Ireland
- Education: Clonliffe College
- Occupation: Roman Catholic priest

John O'Brien (30 May 1931 – 6 January 2008) was a Roman Catholic priest who worked in the Archdiocese of Dublin from 1956 until his death in 2008. He is best remembered as one of Ireland's leading conductors, a prominent organist and founder of the retired St. James' Choir and the Glasnevin Musical Society.

== Life and career ==
=== Early life ===
John O'Brien, eldest of the four children of publican Michael O'Brien and Mary O'Dea, was born in Kilrush, County Clare, on 30 May 1931.

He had a keen interest in music, which was nurtured at home. His mother played the violin, while the family housekeeper sang to the children every evening. At the age of seven, John was sent to Mrs. Atherton, a local piano teacher whose husband was organist of the parish church. A bright pupil, he was considered sufficiently accomplished to play a solo at the next St. Patrick's Day concert in Kilrush.

=== Priesthood ===
John O'Brien attended the Christian Brothers' school in Kilrush until entering the junior seminary for the Diocese of Killaloe in Ennis when he was sixteen. He successfully completed his Leaving Certificate and, not being the chosen for the seminary of Killaloe, O'Brien was directed instead to the Archdiocese of Dublin, where he began his studies in Clonliffe College in September 1949. He was ordained a priest by Archbishop John Charles McQuaid on 25 May 1956.

O'Brien's first appointment was as chaplain to St. Michael's Hospital, Dun Laoghaire and afterwards, in 1957, he was made curate of Glasnevin Parish. He combined this with the first official diocesan chaplaincy to the Bon Secours Hospital. 1962 brought a move to the rural setting of Ballitore in the parish of Narraghmore in County Kildare. This would be O'Brien's base until 1966 when he was relocated in one of Dublin's oldest parishes – St. James's, dominated by the Guinness Brewery. In 1975, he was transferred to St. Andrew's, Westland Row – one of the archbishop's own parishes. He remained there until 1983, when he was promoted to parish priest of St. Canice's, Finglas. He retired in 1996, enjoying the title of Pastor Emeritus while still residing in Finglas.

=== Musical career ===
Fr. John O'Brien seated at the organ

==== The Glasnevin Musical Society ====
In the summer of 1955, O'Brien was asked to conduct Sigmund Romberg's The New Moon in Kilrush. The scheduled conductor was taken ill, and John took the baton with some trepidation as the cast included the renowned English tenor Thomas Round.

In Clonliffe College, O'Brien had briefly come under the guidance of Fathers Sean Quigley and Brendan Lawless. He had sufficient self-confidence to form a choir from the nursing staff in St. Michael's Hospital, and, once in situ in Glasnevin to augment the Church choir there. With the blessing of his parish priest, Michael Geraghty, the Glasnevin Musical Society was founded in 1958.

The Desert Song, under the musical direction of O'Brien, opened at the newly built St. Francis Xavier Hall in Dublin. The success of The Desert Song led to Romberg's ' The Student Prince, with Brychan Powell and Estelle Valery of London's Sadler's Wells Opera Company in the leading roles, in 1959.

The Glasnevin Musical Society broke new ground in February 1960 when O'Brien was approached by the directors of Dublin's Olympia Theatre Stanley Illsey and Leo McCabe. The result was a production of Julius Benedict's opera, The Lily of Killarney. The cast included Veronica Dunne, Bernadette Greevy, John Carolan and Denis Noble.

Romberg's The New Moon, with Belfast soprano Julia Shelley and English baritone Joseph Ward in the principal roles, followed in October 1960 at the St. Francis Xavier Hall. It ran for ten performances.

==== St. James' Choir ====
While stationed at St. James's Parish, and with the blessing of the parish priest, Henry Cunningham, O'Brien expanded the choir and had the organ refurbished. Masses by Palestrina and Mozart were sung in their liturgical settings, and these were extended to public performances with the choristers now firmly established as the St. James's Choir. Their first major event was an RTÉ TV showing of Gounod's St. Cecilia Mass on her name day, 22 November 1971. O'Brien conducted with soloists Bene McAteer, Brendan Cavanagh and Gerald Duffy.

Left to Right: Huw Priday, tenor, Archbishop Luciano Storero (former Papal Nuncio to Ireland), John O'Brien, Niamh Murray, soprano and Roderick Earle, baritone

Haydn's Heiligmesse and Missa in Tempore Belli followed, but a December 1972 performance in St. James's Church of Antonín Dvořák's Requiem Mass was a turning point in the choir's career. It led to RTÉ inviting the group to undertake Haydn's The Creation with the RTÉ Concert Orchestra under Colman Pearce. The soloists were Eithne Troy, Frank Patterson and William Young.

St. James's Choir made three visits (1973, 1975, 1978), with an Irish orchestra, to North America. These included concerts of mainly Irish and sacred music in New York, Detroit, Milwaukee, Muskegon and Toronto. Another transatlantic trip in 1989 found the choir in San Francisco, while Lourdes featured in their itineraries of 1968, 1970, 1972, 1993, 1995 and 1997 when the choir gave a special concert at the Shrine.

In 1984, O'Brien embarked on an annual series of "Christmas Music" events in Dublin's National Concert Hall. Initially for one performance, due to popular demand this was extended to a second from 1988.

The formation of the RTÉ Philharmonic Choir in 1984 meant a reduction in St. James's work for RTÉ, but allowed O'Brien to direct his own concerts in the National Concert Hall. These included Dvořák's Stabat Mater (1986), Verdi's Requiem (1987), Gounod's Messe Solennelle (1989), Handel's Messiah (1990) and Berlioz's Te Deum (1991), this with Stuart Burrows as soloist.

=== Health problems and death ===
O'Brien suffered ill health throughout his life. He had two bouts of pneumonia before he was five years old, and while training for the priesthood at Clonliffe College, he spent three of his seven Christmases in hospital. He suffered regular heart attacks and two strokes since 1990, which forced him to abandon the preparation and performances of major musical works. His health problems also forced him to early retirement from active ministry in 1996.

On 6 January 2008, after taking part at a mass in St. Canice's Church, Finglas (where he was formerly parish priest), John O'Brien returned home and died peacefully, aged 76.
