= Kilrush Town Hall =

Municipal building in Kilrush, County Clare, Ireland

- Halla an Bhaile Cill Rois
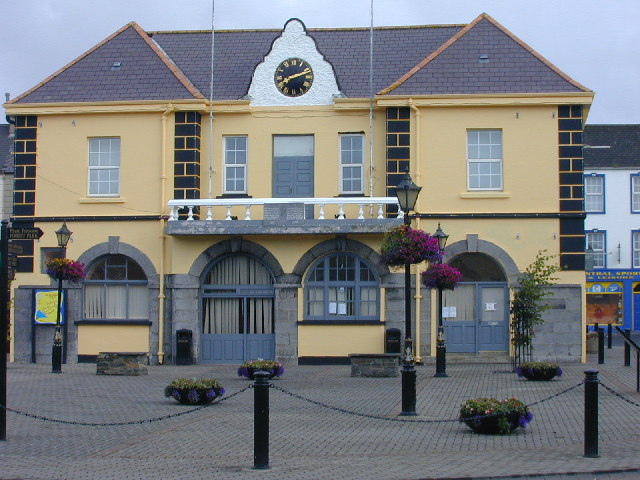
- Kilrush Town Hall

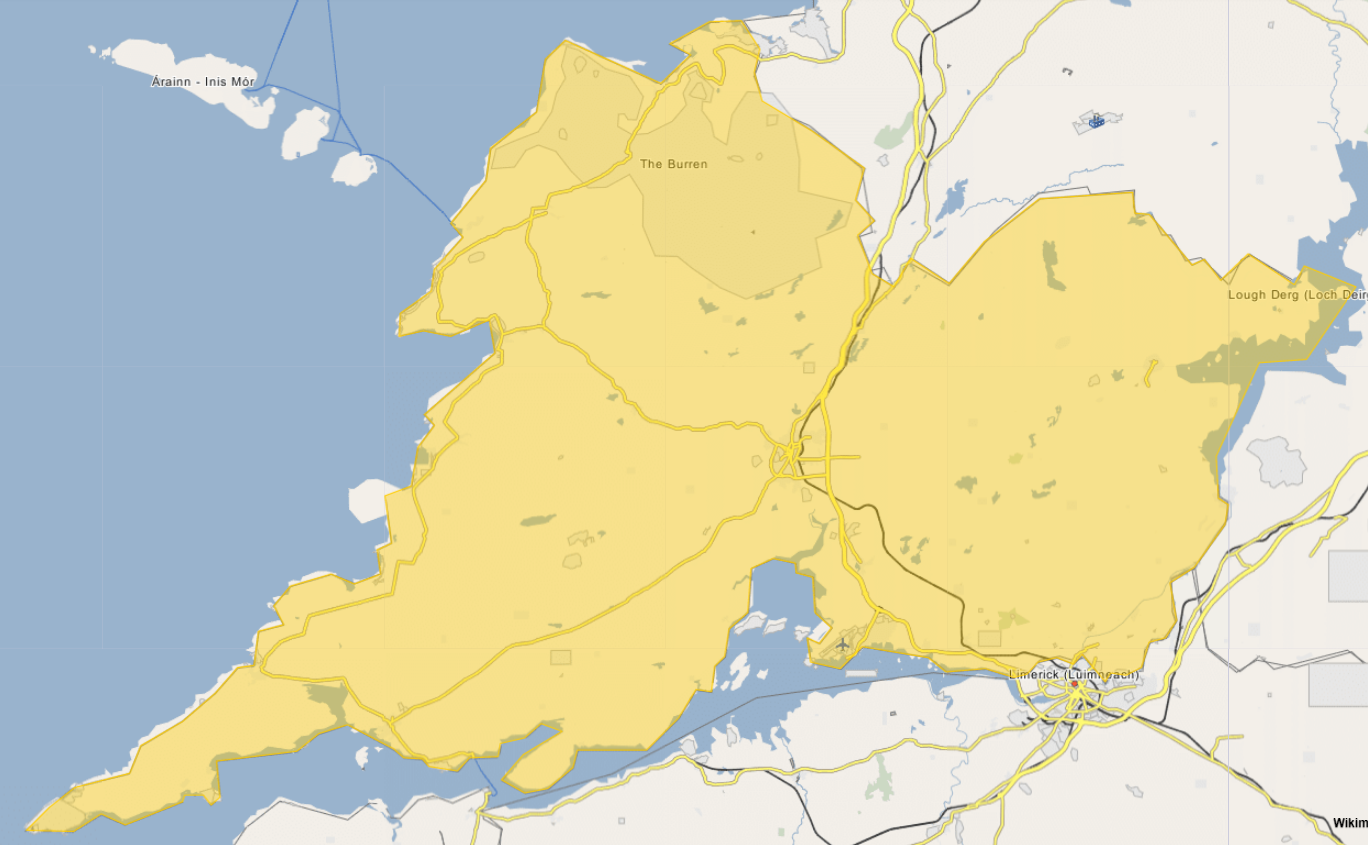
- Location within County Clare

General information
- Architectural style: Neoclassical style
- Location: Market Square, Kilrush, Ireland
- Coordinates: 52.6380°N 9.4843°W
- Completed: 1808

Kilrush Town Hall (Irish: Halla an Bhaile Cill Rois) is a municipal building in the Market Square, Kilrush, County Clare, Ireland. The building is currently used as by Clare County Council as offices for the delivery of local services.

== History ==
The building commissioned as a market house for the town by the member of parliament and wealthy land owner, John Ormsby Vandeleur, whose seat was at Kilrush House. The new building was designed in the neoclassical style, built in brick with a cement render finish and limestone dressings, and was completed in 1808. The original design involved a symmetrical main frontage of four bays facing south onto the Market Square with the central section of two bays slightly projected forward. The ground floor was arcaded, so that markets could be held, with an assembly hall on the first floor. There were four arches on the ground floor, supported by pilasters and imposts and formed by voussoirs with keystones. The first floor was fenestrated by sash windows. The central section was surmounted by a pediment with a roundel in the tympanum. There was a central belfry with an ogee-shaped dome.

In 1903, a monument was erected to the southwest of the building to commemorate the lives of the Manchester Martyrs. These were three Irish nationalists – William Philip Allen, Michael Larkin, and Michael O'Brien – who were hanged in 1867 following their conviction for murder after an armed attack on a police van in Manchester, in which a police officer was shot dead. The monument, designed and sculpted by Joseph K. Bracken in the Romanesque style, took the form of a figure of a woman, known as the "Maid of Erin", standing on a two-tier arcaded pedestal.

After Kilrush Urban District Council acquired the building from Captain Alexander Moore Vandeleur in 1910, it became the offices and meeting place of the council. A Ladies Recruiting Committee was formed in the assembly room during the First World War to encourage local young men to enlist in the Irish Regiments of the British Army.

The building was burnt down by the Black and Tans in 1921 during the Irish War of Independence. It was later rebuilt to a slightly different design: the central section was slightly recessed, rather than slightly projected forward, and the central section was fenestrated by three windows, rather than two windows, on the first floor. The reconstruction was undertaken at a cost of £1,733 and completed in 1931. As part of the celebrations to commemorate the 50th anniversary of the Easter Rising, a balustraded balcony together with a commemorative plaque, were added to the central section of the building in 1966.

The building continued to be used as the offices of the urban district council until 2002, and then as the offices of the successor town council, but ceased to be the local seat of government in 2014, when the council was dissolved and administration of the town was amalgamated with Clare County Council in accordance with the Local Government Reform Act 2014. Following the completion of an extensive programme of refurbishment works, involving the installation of internet hubs, the building was re-opened by the Minister of State at the Department of Enterprise, Trade and Employment, Pat Breen, on 26 March 2018.
