= David Comyn =

Irish Language Revivalist (1854-1907)

David Comyn (in Irish, Dáithí Coimín or Dáithí Ó Coimín) (1854–1907) was an Irish language revivalist from Kilrush parish in County Clare. He is best known as co-founder of the Society for the Preservation of the Irish Language (SPIL) and as editor of the Gaelic Journal.

== Biography ==
David Comyn, son of John Comyn and Keat Hassett, was baptised in Kilrush parish on 14 May 1854.

He moved to Dublin to work as a bank clerk in the National Bank (on whose banknotes his signature eventually appeared).

He threw in all his energies in support of the movement, started in the 1870s, to preserve the Irish language. From that time to his death, in 1907, he laboured zealously in its behalf, in the Gaelic Union and other kindred bodies. He was a Member of the Royal Irish Academy, first editor of the Gaelic Journal, and edited and annotated portion of Geoffrey Keating's History of Ireland, for the Irish Texts Society of London. He left his books and manuscripts as a gift to the National Library of Ireland.

By 1901, he was living at 43 Brighton Square in Rathmines.

He died (from cirrhosis of the liver) on 22 January 1907 at his home at 43 Brighton Square in Dublin and was buried in Glasnevin Cemetery. He left an estate of £4,464 12s. 9d.

Gaelscoil Uí Choimín in his native parish is named in his honour, and Coymn Place, in Drumcondra, Dublin.
