= Pecker Dunne =

Irish musician (1933–2012)

- Born: Patrick Dunne; 1 April 1933; Castlebar, County Mayo, Ireland
- Died: 19 December 2012 (aged 79) Killimer, County Clare, Ireland
- Genres: Folk, traditional Irish
- Occupations: Musician, songwriter
- Instruments: Vocals, banjo, fiddle, melodeon, guitar, mandolin
- Years active: 1942–2012

Patrick "Pecker" Dunne (1 April 1933 – 19 December 2012) was an Irish musician and seanchaí.

Dunne was born in Castlebar, County Mayo, "in the old county home". His family were Irish Travellers originally from County Wexford, where his father was a fiddle player. In Parley-poet and Chanter, an autobiography transcribed by Micheál Ó hAodha (page 21), he stated that he later lived in the Dublin suburb of Drimnagh. He was one of Ireland's most noted banjo players and was also proficient on the fiddle, melodeon and guitar, and was among an elite of Traveller musicians.

Dunne became known to a wide Irish audience from his regular busking at GAA sporting fixtures, particularly in Munster. Later he played in England, France, Australia and New York City, where he appeared with The Dubliners. He also performed alongside Richard Harris and Stephen Rea in the 1996 feature film Trojan Eddie.

He lived in Killimer, County Clare with his wife and four children. He died there on 19 December 2012, aged 79, and is buried in Burrane, near Killimer.

== Recordings ==
- Ireland's own Pecker Dunne - the Tinkerman. 1987 (re-released on CD (Paddyland PLMCD) in 2001)
- Travellin' People from Ireland. Margaret Barry & Pecker Dunne
- Very Best of Ireland's Legendary Street Singer
