= Tarbert, County Kerry =

Town in County Kerry, Ireland

Tarbert Tairbeart (Irish)
- Town
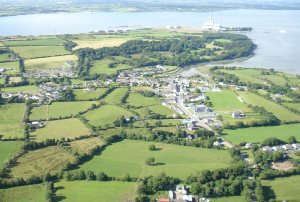
- Aerial photo of Tarbert (looking north)

- Location in Ireland
- Coordinates: 52°34′21″N 9°22′30″W
- Country: Ireland
- Province: Munster
- County: County Kerry
- Local electoral area: Listowel
- Dáil constituency: Kerry
- EU Parliament: South

Population (2022)
  - Total: 546
- Irish Grid Reference: R065477

Tarbert (Irish: Tairbeart, meaning 'peninsula' or 'isthmus') is a village in the north of County Kerry, with woodland to the south and the Shannon estuary to the north. It lies on the N69 coast road that runs along the estuary from Limerick before turning inland at Tarbert towards Listowel. As of the 2022 census, Tarbert village had a population of 546.

== Geography ==
=== Location ===
Tarbert is in the historical barony of Iraghticonnor in the civil parish of Kilnaughtin. Located on the N69 and N67 roads, Tarbert is connected by ferry (across the Shannon estuary) to Killimer in County Clare.

=== Tarbert Island ===
The nearby island is linked to the mainland by a short isthmus. There is a car ferry service from the island to the town of Killimer in County Clare. This service, operated by Shannon Ferries, provides a link between the N69 in County Kerry and the N67 in County Clare.

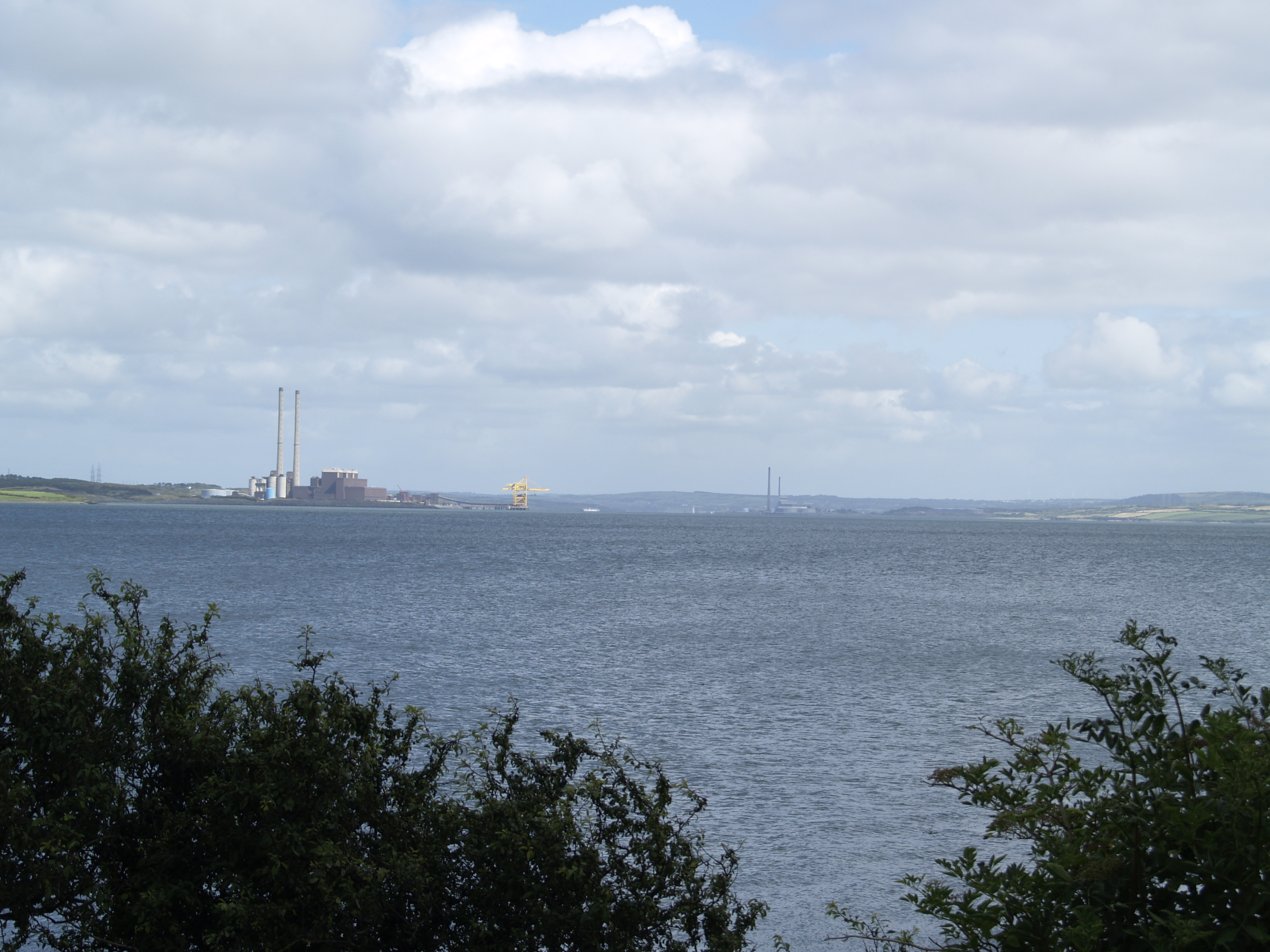
Tarbert Power Station

Also on the island is a small lighthouse and an electricity plant, Tarbert Power Station, with four oil-fired turbines and a capacity of 640 MW. This plant, opened in 1969, was the site of an explosion in 2003 that killed two workers and seriously injured another. The plant was due to be de-commissioned in 2010, with the loss of 130 jobs. However, the plant was purchased by Spanish power company Endesa in January 2009. As of 2023, the plant was operated by SSE.

==== Population (Tarbert Island) ====
Historical population

Year	Pop.	±%
1841	134	—
1851	145	+8.2%
1861	184	+26.9%
1871	175	−4.9%
1881	756	+332.0%
1891	170	−77.5%
1901	124	−27.1%
1911	87	−29.8%
1926	83	−4.6%

Year	Pop.	±%
1936	61	−26.5%
1946	52	−14.8%
1951	38	−26.9%
1956	31	−18.4%
1961	28	−9.7%
1966	22	−21.4%
1971	20	−9.1%
1979	13	−35.0%
1981	18	+38.5%

Year	Pop.	±%
1986	17	−5.6%
1991	17	+0.0%
1996	13	−23.5%
2002	5	−61.5%
2006	8	+60.0%
2011	6	−25.0%
2016	5	−16.7%
2022	2	−60.0%

Source: Central Statistics Office. "CNA17: Population by Off Shore Island, Sex and Year". CSO.ie.

== Built heritage ==
=== Bridewell ===
Tarbert's bridewell is a former courthouse and prison in the village. Built in 1831, it was used for trying local court cases and for holding prisoners awaiting transfer to the County Jail in Tralee. The jail closed in 1874 but the courthouse continued in use until the 1950s. In 1993, the complex was reopened as a museum and visitor centre.

=== Tarbert Lighthouse ===
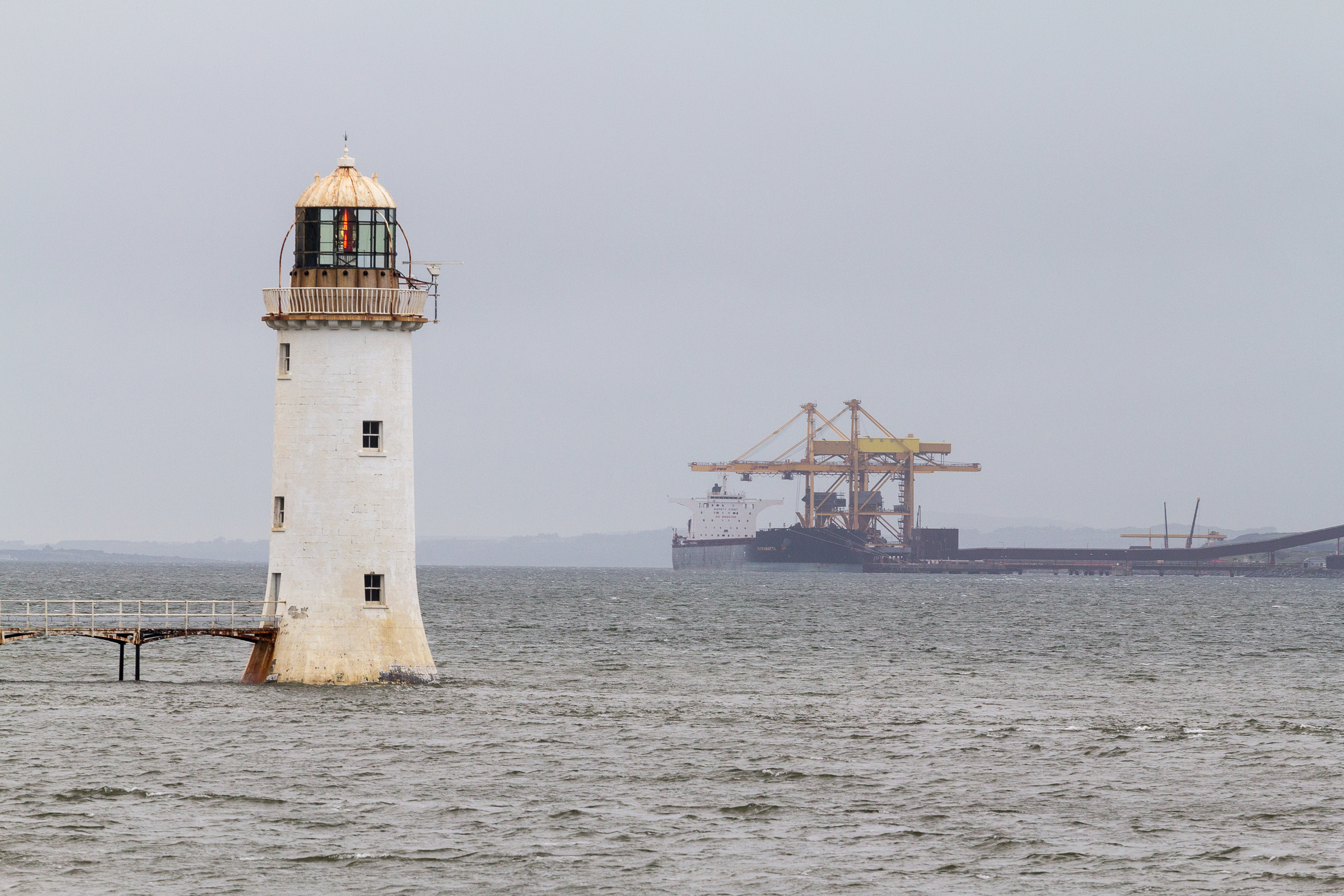
Tarbert Lighthouse

Tarbert Lighthouse came into operation on 31 March 1834 H.T.L.H. Tarbert Island lighthouse, which is still operational, is a harbour light to guide vessels passing up and down the Shannon estuary. It is built on a tidal rock on the north side of Tarbert Island and a cast-iron bridge connects the lighthouse to the shore.

=== Fort Shannon ===
Fort Shannon was a coastal artillery fortress, near Tarbert, built by the Irish Army in 1942 to protect the River Shannon against potentially hostile warships during The Emergency (as World War II was known in Ireland). It was the only such fortress to have been built by the Irish Government since independence. It was reduced to a care and maintenance basis in 1946 and completely abandoned several years later.

=== Tarbert House ===
Tarbert House is a historic country house dating from 1690. It was built by the Leslie family, and is still owned by them.

== Amenities ==
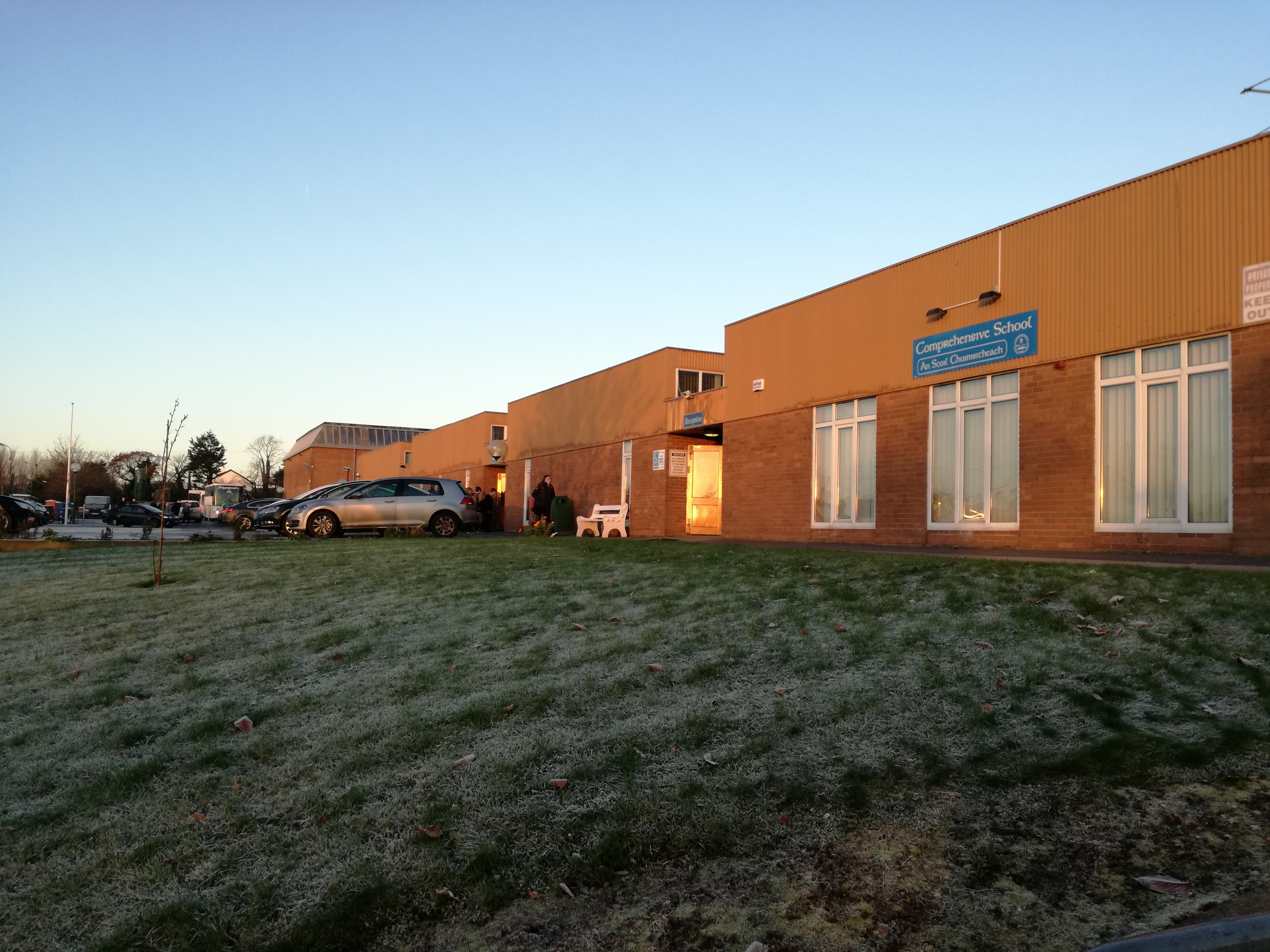
Tarbert Comprehensive School

St Mary's Catholic Church is in Tarbert parish in the Roman Catholic Diocese of Kerry. It was built in 1833.

There are two schools in the area: Tarbert National School (primary) and Tarbert Comprehensive (secondary). As of 2024, the secondary school had an enrolment of 501, and the national (primary) school had 138 pupils.

The local Gaelic Athletic Association (GAA) club, Tarbert GAA, is based in Shannon Park in the village.

== Notable people ==
- Thomas MacGreevy (1893–1967), poet, critic and director of the National Gallery of Ireland
- Jennifer Musa (1917–2008), Irish-born, Pakistani nurse, politician and social worker

== See also ==
- List of towns and villages in Ireland
