= Shannon Ferry =

Irish ferry operator

Shannon Ferry Group
- Company type: Limited Company
- Industry: Passenger transportation Vehicles transportation
- Founded: 1969
- Headquarters: Killimer, County Clare, Ireland
- Area served: River Shannon
- Website: www.shannonferries.com

Shannon Ferry Group (also known as Shannon Ferries) is an Irish company that operates a roll-on/roll-off (or ro-ro) ferry crossing of the Shannon Estuary between counties Clare and Kerry. The company is based in Killimer, County Clare, with the service operating between Killimer and Tarbert, County Kerry. It currently operates two ferries, Shannon Dolphin and Shannon Breeze. It is the longest domestic ferry service in Ireland.

== Services ==
The crossing takes about 20 minutes, with hourly departures year round except Christmas Day, the frequency doubles in summer. There are toilets on the Tarbert side, and a gift shop, cafe and toilets on the Killimer side.

== History ==
Before the introduction of the service the quickest way to travel between the two locations was via Limerick city, a 137-kilometre (85 mi) journey. The service therefore saves hours on the travel time between Kerry and West Clare. It is a popular tourist route as it is the fastest route between the popular tourist destinations of Kerry (i.e. Dingle, Killarney) and north to Clare (i.e. The Cliffs of Moher, The Burren) and Galway (i.e. Galway City, Connemara). The River Shannon is the largest and deepest river in the British Isles, so a bridge would be difficult and costly to build.

The service was inaugurated in 1969, with six families based on both sides of the crossing investing to create the company. Vehicle traffic has increased since the promotion of the Wild Atlantic Way tourist route along west Ireland, which the crossing forms part of.

== Fleet ==
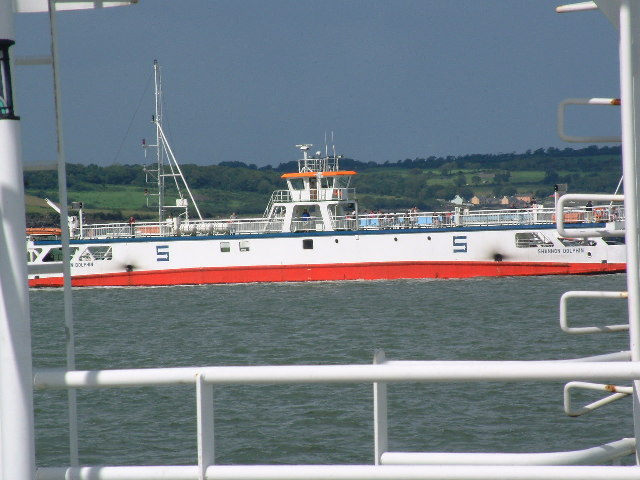
Shannon Dolphin seen from the deck of Shannon Breeze

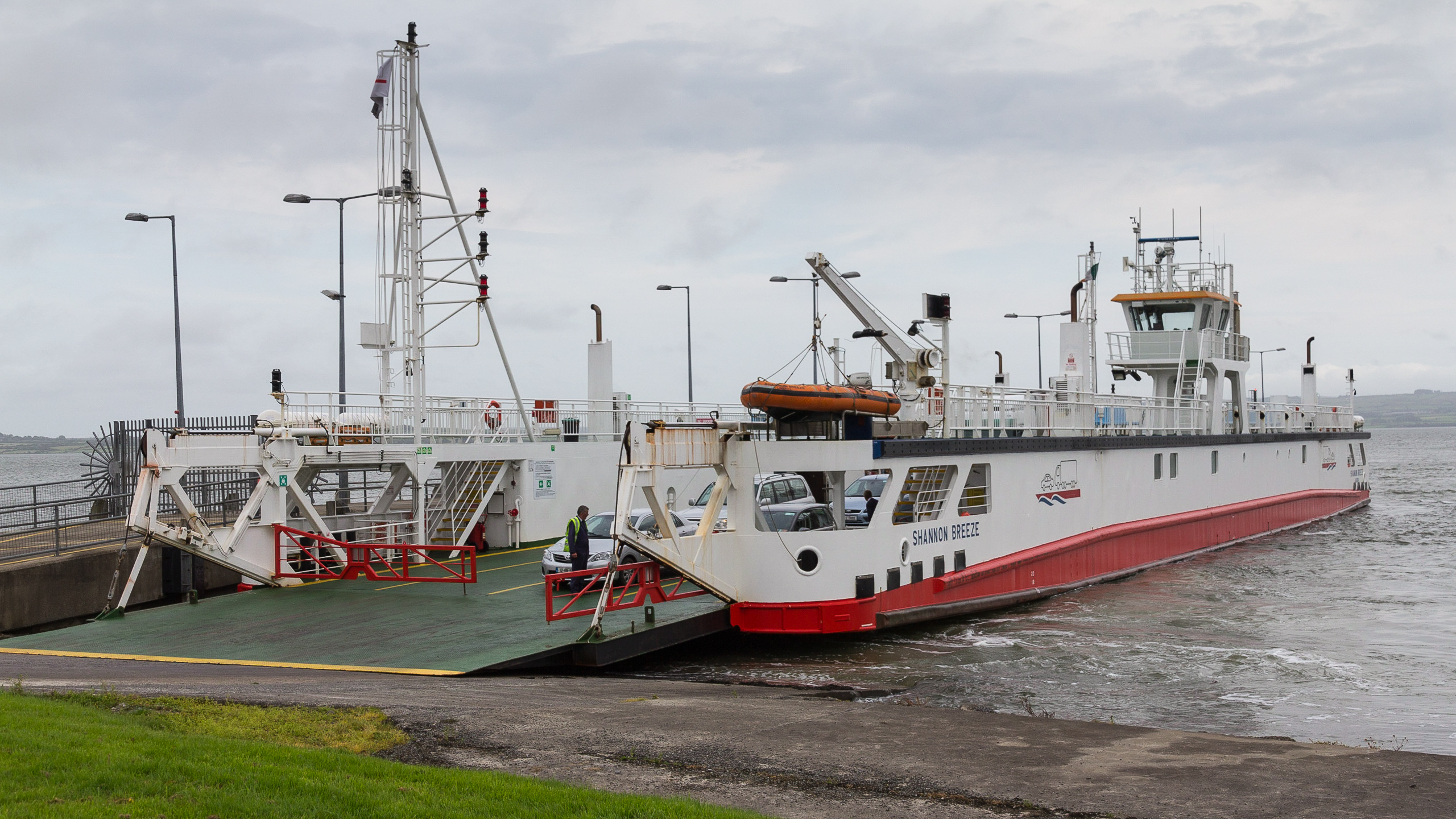
Shannon Breeze

Shannon Ferry Group has had four ferries in its history. The service is currently provided by Shannon Dolphin and Shannon Breeze.

Name	Years	Builder	Cars	Pax	Note
Shannon Heather	1969-1997	Dartmouth	30	250	Sold to Passage East Ferries
Shannon Willow	1979-2003	Scott & Sons, Bowling	44	300	Sold to Lough Foyle Ferries
Shannon Dolphin	1995–present	Appledore Shipbuilders	52	350	Commissioned and built in Appledore, England
Shannon Breeze	2000–present	Appledore Shipbuilders	60	350	Commissioned and built in Appledore, England
