= Killimer =

Village in County Clare, Ireland

Killimer Cill Íomaí
- Village
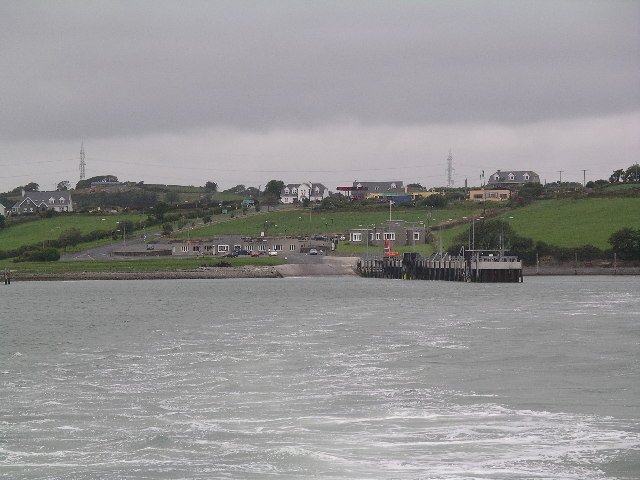
- Killimer Ferryport

- Location in Ireland
- Coordinates: 52°37′0.74″N 9°23′24.74″W
- Country: Ireland
- Province: Munster
- County: County Clare
- Elevation: 20 m (66 ft)

Population (2011)
  - Urban: 498
- Time zone: UTC+0 (WET)
  - Summer (DST): UTC-1 (IST (WEST))
- Irish Grid Reference: R054791

Killimer (Irish: Cill Íomaí, meaning 'church of Aodhamair') is a village in County Clare, Ireland, in a civil parish of the same name. It is located on the northern bank of the Shannon and the N67 which passes through the village.

== Location ==
The village is the northern port of the Killimer–Tarbert car ferry service, operated by Shannon Ferries.

The village is in the Killimer parish of the Roman Catholic Diocese of Killaloe. Parish churches are St Imy in Killimer and St Senan's in Knockerra.

East of the village is the Moneypoint coal-fired electricity generating station.

== Population ==
According to the geographer Samuel Lewis the parish counted 3023 inhabitants in 1837. The 2011 census returned 498 inhabitants for Killimer.

== GAA ==
Killimer GAA returned to competitive action at senior level in 2012. Due to a declining population Killimer had not enough players to field a senior team in the period 2008-2012. Most players had been playing with Shannon Gaels or Kilrush Shams in those years. Killimers only Clare Senior Football Championship triumph was in 1896.

== Notable people ==
- Íomar Fir Bolg, saint from the fifth or sixth century.
- Pecker Dunne, musician.

== See also ==
- List of towns and villages in Ireland
