= Edison Mission Energy =

Edison Mission Energy (EME) was an independent power producer based in California, United States. It was owned by Edison International. On December 17, 2012, EME filed for Chapter 11 Bankruptcy with a proposal to transfer control of the company to holders of $3.7 billion in unsecured bonds. The reorganization plan was approved in March 2014 by the U.S. Bankruptcy Court. Under the reorganization plan, Edison Mission Energy would have remained a subsidiary of Edison International, but a new trust, under the control of the former bond-holders, would contain almost all of the former assets and liabilities of EME.

NRG Energy acquired all of the assets of Edison Mission Energy in 2014 for $2.64 billion with approval from the U.S. bankruptcy court, following agreement among EME, Edison International and certain EME creditors. At that time, EME's portfolio included 1,700 MW of wind power; 1,600 MW of gas-fired capacity; 4,300 MW of coal-fired capacity, and 400 MW of oil and waste coal-fired capacity.
