= Great Island Power Station =

Irish power station

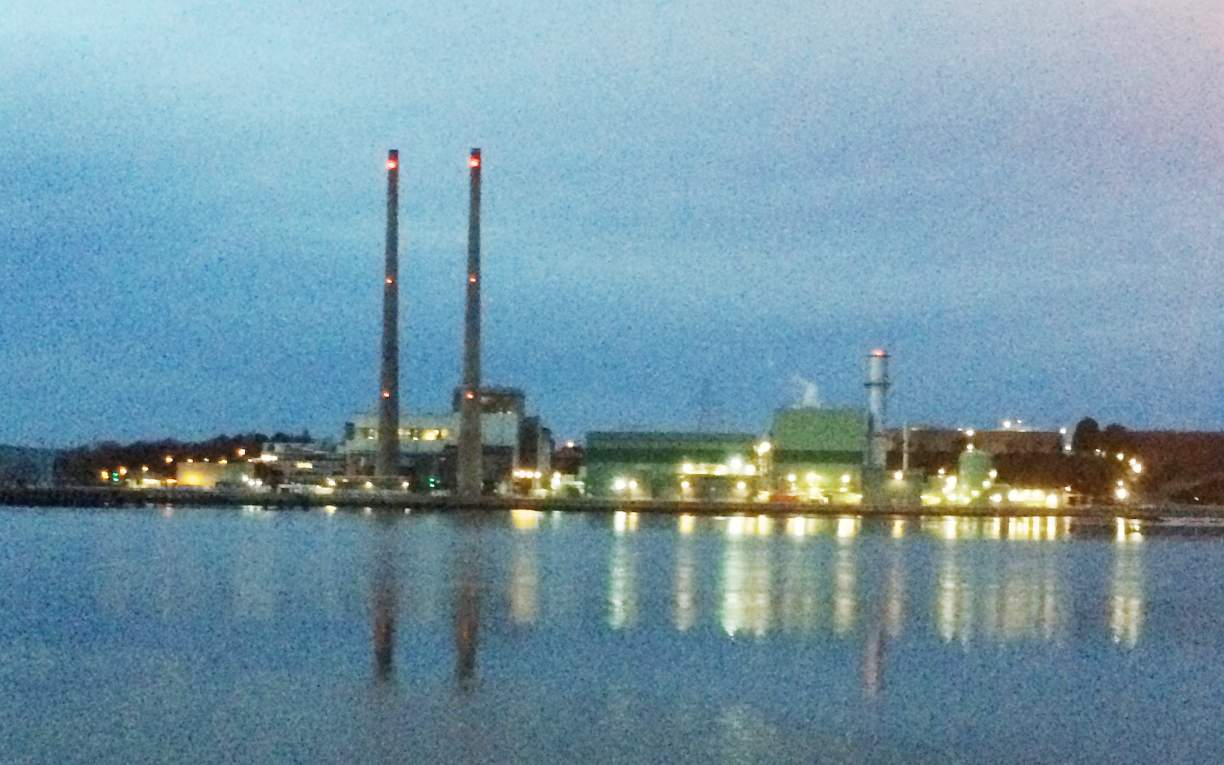
- Country: Ireland
- Location: County Wexford
- Coordinates: 52°16′44″N 6°59′31″W
- Status: Operational
- Construction began: 1963 (63 years ago)
- Commission date: December 1967 (58 years ago); Upgraded in September 2014 (11 years ago)
- Construction cost: 330 million € (2014)
- Owners: SSE Thermal (2012-present); Endesa (2009-2012); ESB Group (1967-2009)

Thermal power station
- Primary fuel: Natural gas
- Turbine technology: Gas turbine
- Site area: 143 acres (58 ha)
- Cooling source: River Barrow
- Combined cycle?: Yes

Power generation
- Units operational: 1 × 460 MW
- Make and model: Mitsubishi Power (1)
- Units decommissioned: 2 × 60 MW; 1 × 120 MW
- Nameplate capacity: 460 MW

External links
- Commons: Related media on Commons

Great Island Power Station is a gas fired and former heavy fuel oil fired power station situated near Waterford Harbour in Great Island, County Wexford, Ireland, that supplies electricity to more than 500,000 Irish homes. It is located at the confluence of the rivers Barrow and Suir, near Campile. The station opened in 1967 and was operated by the Electricity Supply Board (ESB) with three heavy fuel oil units and a total power of 240 MW since 1972. The station was scheduled to close by 2010, until it was sold to Endesa in January 2009. In October 2012, the plant was acquired by SSE Thermal.

In September 2014, the oil powered units were shut down, and replaced by a new 430 MW combined cycle gas turbine (CCGT) gas fired plant on the same site. The project needed a new 44.5 km gas pipeline from the existing transmission network at Baunlusk, 6 km south of Kilkenny city.

== Kilmokea Halt ==
There was a short-lived halt on the adjacent railway (Rosslare - Waterford line) used to bring workers involved in the construction of the station to and from it.
