= SSE plc =

British energy company

- Type: Public limited company
- Traded as: LSE: SSE; FTSE 100 component
- ISIN: GB0007908733
- Industry: Energy
- Founded: 1998; 28 years ago
- Headquarters: Perth, Scotland, UK
- Area served: United Kingdom; Ireland; Selected international markets
- Key people: Sir John Manzoni (Chairman); Martin Pibworth (CEO)
- Services: Power generation and distribution, natural gas production, transportation, and distribution, telecommunications, metering, energy supplier
- Revenue: ▲£10,186.5 million (2026)
- Operating income: ▼£2,209.2 million (2026)
- Net income: ▲£1,411.6 million (2026)
- Number of employees: approx 15,000
- Subsidiaries: SSE Thermal; Scottish and Southern Electricity Networks; SSE Renewables; SSE Airtricity; SSE Energy Markets; SSE Energy Solutions; Multifuel Energy
- Website: www.sse.com

SSE plc (formerly Scottish and Southern Energy plc) is a British multinational electricity company headquartered in Perth, Scotland. It is listed on the London Stock Exchange, and is a constituent of the FTSE 100 Index.

Its principal businesses include SSE Renewables, SSE Thermal, Scottish and Southern Electricity Networks, SSE Airtricity, SSE Energy Markets and SSE Energy Solutions.

== History ==
=== Origins ===
The company has its origins in two public sector electricity supply authorities. The former North of Scotland Hydro-Electric Board was founded in 1943 to design, construct and manage hydroelectricity projects in the Highlands of Scotland, and took over further generation and distribution responsibilities on the nationalisation of the electricity industry within the United Kingdom in 1948.

The former Southern Electricity Board was created in 1948 to distribute electricity in Southern England. Whilst the Southern Electricity Board was a distribution only authority, with no power generation capacity of its own, the North of Scotland Hydro-Electric board was a broader spectrum organisation, with its own generating capabilities.

Because of its history and location, the Hydro-Electric Board was responsible for most of the hydroelectric generating capacity in the United Kingdom. Both authorities were privatised in 1990/91, initially retaining their pre privatisation geographic and functional bases. The North of Scotland Hydro-Electric Board became Scottish Hydro-Electric, whilst the Southern Electricity Board became Southern Electric. They both later became part of Scottish and Southern Electricity Networks (SSEN) - Distribution.

=== Post privatisation ===
Scottish and Southern Energy was formed in September 1998, following a merger between Scottish Hydro-Electric and Southern Electric. In August 2000, Scottish and Southern Energy acquired the SWALEC energy supply business. SWALEC operate exclusively in Wales while SSE operates in Scotland and England.

In July 2004, the company acquired the Ferrybridge and Fiddlers Ferry power stations for £250 million. In January 2008, it went on to buy Airtricity Holdings, an Irish wind farm business. In August 2009, it agreed to purchase Uskmouth power station from Welsh Power Group. In April 2010, the company purchased the natural gas exploration and production assets of Hess Corporation in three areas of the United Kingdom Continental Shelf – Everest/Lomond, Easington and Bacton.

In January 2010, Scottish and Southern Energy shortened its name to SSE.

=== Separation of retail supply division ===
In November 2017, it was announced that SSE was looking to separate from its retail subsidiary which would then merge with the Npower division of rival Innogy. It was planned that SSE shareholders will own 65.6% of the demerged entity and Innogy would hold the remainder. The resulting company would have been listed on the London Stock Exchange and included npower's residential and business retail business, and SSE's residential energy supply and home services business, excluding its business in Ireland. Although the merger received preliminary regulatory clearance from the Competition and Markets Authority on 30 August 2018, and full clearance was given on 10 October 2018, it was abandoned on 17 December 2018, with the companies blaming "very challenging market conditions".

In September 2019, SSE announced that it would be selling its retail business, SSE Energy Services, to OVO Energy: the transaction was completed in January 2020. Its customers were migrated to the OVO Energy brand by 2023.

=== Swiss holding company ===
In November 2019, SSE moved its UK business into a new Swiss holding company, confirming that it had done so following the Labour Party's pledge to take it into state ownership. It said the move was:

an additional safeguard, which SSE does not believe would be required in practice, should SSE's electricity networks businesses and interests in SGN become the subject of proposed legislation for nationalisation.

The Labour Party said:

The UK's energy networks are vital strategic infrastructure on which we all rely. You cannot boil a kettle, heat your home or run a business without the grid. The idea that private owners, who have been ripping off the public, would move offshore in an attempt to prolong the rip-off illustrates just why we need the grid back in public hands.

=== Other divestments ===
In August 2021, SSE agreed to sell its 33.3% stake in gas distribution company SGN for £1.2 billion.

== Operations ==
=== Living wage ===
SSE became the largest officially accredited Living Wage Employer in the United Kingdom in 2013. All its employees across the United Kingdom were guaranteed to receive the then-Living Wage rate of at least £7.85 an hour in 2013.

=== Fair Tax Mark ===
In October 2014, SSE became the first company on the FTSE 100 to be awarded the Fair Tax Mark which is an independent accreditation process for identifying companies making an effort to be transparent about their tax affairs.

=== Sponsorship ===
The company currently sponsors the SSE Arena in Belfast. It previously sponsored Wembley Arena in London and The Hydro in Glasgow, but the naming rights of these venues switched to OVO with the sale of its retail supply division.

=== Other ===
In February 2022, the company signed up to the UN's Women Empowerment Principles, an initiative to support women in the workplace which was founded by United Nations Global Compact and UN Women.

== Regulator action ==
In April 2013, industry regulator Ofgem fined SSE £10.5 million for mis-selling gas and electricity.

In September 2020, industry regulator Ofgem fined SSE £2.06 million for failing to publish information about the future availability of its generation capacity in a timely manner. SSE co-operated fully with Ofgem's investigation.

== See also ==
- Energy policy of Scotland
- Electricity in Northern Ireland
- Energy use and conservation in the United Kingdom
- Green electricity in the United Kingdom
- Peterhead Power Station
