= Tarbert Power Station =

Irish power station

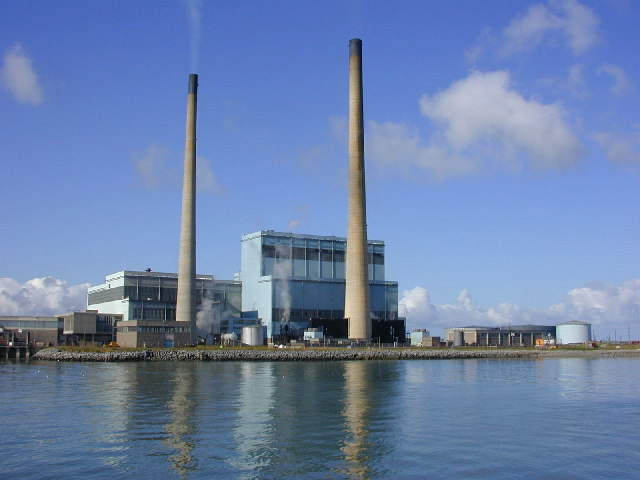
- Country: Ireland
- Location: Tarbert, County Kerry
- Coordinates: 52.589°N 9.364°W
- Status: Decommissioned
- Construction began: 1966
- Commission date: 1969-09 (Unit 1); 1969-12 (Unit 2); 1976-04 (Unit 3); 1977-04 (Unit 4)
- Decommission date: 2023
- Construction cost: £55 million
- Owners: ESB (1969-2009); Endesa (2009-2012); SSE Thermal (2012-)
- Operator: SSE Thermal

Thermal power station
- Primary fuel: Fuel oil
- Turbine technology: Steam turbine
- Chimneys: 2
- Cooling source: Shannon Estuary

Power generation
- Units operational: 57 MW (Unit 1); 57 MW (Unit 2); 256 MW (Unit 3); 256 MW (Unit 4)
- Make and model: All four boilers made by MAN Germany, Units 1&2 turbines/generators are Brown Boveri (ABB), and Units 3&4 are Alsthom (Alstom)
- Nameplate capacity: 626 MW
- Annual net output: 1222 GWh (2008)

External links
- Commons: Related media on Commons

Tarbert Power Station is a decommissioned oil-fired power station situated on the Shannon Estuary in Tarbert, County Kerry, Ireland. Construction commenced in October 1966 and the first block was commissioned in 1969. The station comprised two 60 MW (Unit I and II) and two 250 MW oil fired steam turbines. It was the largest station of ESB during the 1980s. The plant was sold to Endesa in 2009, and subsequently to SSE in 2012.

Until early 2022 it was scheduled for closure by the end of 2023. However, due to the 2020s energy crisis, the Irish government announced in February 2022 that Tarbert would maintain operation for an indefinite amount of time, until enough low-carbon generating capacity was available as a replacement. Nevertheless, the station eventually closed at the end of 2023 as originally planned.

== Incidents ==
In 2003 Tarbert was the site of an explosion that killed two workers and seriously injured another. In September 2022 one boiler was damaged by a fire, which led to loss of half of block 3's generating capacity, 120 MW. The generator was expected to return to full capacity in February 2023.

== Replacement ==
In 2023 plans emerged to replace the fuel-oil fired units by a new 350 MW open cycle gas turbine Next Generation Power Station with one Hydrotreated Vegetable Oil (HVO)-fired unit. With planned construction begin in 2024, the new unit is scheduled for operation in 2026.

== Units ==
Unit	Capacity (MW)	Primary Fuel	Cycle	Boiler Type	Condenser Cooling	Status
TB1	54	Heavy Fuel Oil	Condensing Steam Cycle	Drum	Water	disused
TB2	54	Heavy Fuel Oil	Condensing Steam Cycle	Drum	Water	disused
TB3	241	Heavy Fuel Oil	Condensing Steam Cycle	Once-through	Water	currently runs at half capacity due to damage by fire
TB4	243	Heavy Fuel Oil	Condensing Steam Cycle	Once-through	Water	offline from April 2021 to Spring 2023 for maintenance
