= Big Six energy suppliers =

Great Britain's main energy suppliers

The Big Six were Great Britain's largest retail suppliers of gas and electricity, who dominated the market following liberalisation in the late 1990s. By 2002, six companies – British Gas, EDF Energy, E.ON, RWE npower, Scottish Power and SSE – had emerged from the 15 former incumbent monopoly suppliers (the 14 regional public electricity suppliers and British Gas).

In 2008, the Big Six still had over 99% of domestic and small business customers. They were vertically integrated in electricity, owning sufficient generation capacity to supply all their customers; while in gas, only Centrica (British Gas) owned production facilities. By the third quarter of 2019, after efforts by the regulator Ofgem to promote competition, their combined share in Great Britain was 70% for electricity supply and 69% for gas. The purchase of SSE's retail business in January 2020 by OVO Energy, a competitor founded in 2009, marked the end of the original Big Six.

== The companies ==
In 2008, the six companies were:

Supplier	Parent	Other brands	Former brands (including retail/supply divisions of former regional electricity boards)	Notes
British Gas	Centrica	Scottish Gas		
EDF Energy	Électricité de France		SEEBOARD, SWEB Energy, London Electricity	
E.ON UK	E.ON		East Midlands Electricity, NORWEB, Powergen	
npower	RWE (from 2002); Innogy (from 2016); E.ON (from 2019)		Midlands Electricity, Northern Electric, Yorkshire Electricity	Customers migrated to E.ON Next between 2020 and 2021
Scottish Power	Iberdrola (from 2007)		MANWEB	
SSE			Scottish and Southern, Southern Electric, SWALEC, Scottish Hydro	Customers migrated to OVO Energy between 2020 and 2023

== 2014–2016 competition investigation ==
In June 2014, energy market regulator Ofgem referred the energy industry to the Competition and Markets Authority (CMA). The authority investigated the "six large energy firms" and published its report in June 2016. For the retail market, the report recommended:

- Removal of the requirement imposed by the 2014 Retail Market Review that limited suppliers to offering no more than four tariffs
- Establishment by Ofgem of a database of customers who have been on a "standard variable tariff" for three years or more, which competitors could use to contact those customers
- A temporary price cap for customers on prepayment meters
- Measures to support price comparison websites in the energy market.

== Consolidation to Big Five ==
In 2017, SSE and Npower announced a merger of their retail businesses, but this was scrapped in 2018.

Just after the failed SSE-Npower merger in late 2018, it was reported that a consolidation to the Big Five would still occur, as Npower would be acquired by default by E.ON due to the already-planned asset swap by the respective German parents, Innogy and E.ON. This was completed in 2019.

== Alternatives to the Big Six ==
In December 2014, Utility Warehouse, part of FTSE 250-listed company Telecom Plus became the UK's biggest independent energy supplier through a £218m deal to buy 770,000 existing customers from npower. In September 2014, First Utility (since rebranded as Shell Energy) announced it was the first independent utility supplier to reach the milestone of 1m customer accounts for gas and electricity – the equivalent of 550,000 customers, which made it the seventh-largest energy supplier in the UK and the country's biggest independent energy provider. In June 2015, a Cornwall Report stated Opus Energy had broken the dominance of the 'Big Six' energy suppliers in the business market.

The Competition and Markets Authority published an investigation into the energy supply market in June 2016, following a referral by Ofgem in June 2014. The report identified 34 suppliers of both electricity and gas to households, and described the three largest suppliers outside the Big Six as "mid-tier suppliers"; these were First Utility, OVO Energy and Utility Warehouse. Other significant suppliers (each with more than around 1% market share) were Co-operative Energy, Extra Energy and Utilita Energy (specialising in pre-pay customers). The combined market share of suppliers outside the Big Six had increased from less than 1% in 2011 to around 13% in the first quarter of 2016.

Since 2009, other entrants into the market include a number of new energy companies including Bulb Energy, Good Energy, Ecotricity, and Octopus Energy. Many of these newer entrants are seeing significant growth in customer numbers, in part due to their greater commitment to renewable energy and, in the case of Co-op Energy, community renewable energy projects.

The energy regulator Ofgem maintains a list of all licensed electricity suppliers and distribution network operators.

=== Local authority-owned companies ===
Three of the alternative energy companies have been owned by local authorities. The first such company since 1948 was Robin Hood Energy, owned by Nottingham City Council, which entered the market in 2015. Bristol Energy, also launched in 2015, was owned by Bristol City Council. Both Robin Hood Energy and Bristol Energy were available to consumers throughout the country until their demise in 2020.

In January 2020, London Power was launched by the Mayor of London. Contrary to the other two companies, it only provides gas and electricity to London homes. London Power is not itself an energy supplier, instead it is a partnership between the Greater London Authority and a providing partner, currently Octopus Energy.

=== Defunct competitor companies ===
==== Before 2021 ====
By January 2019, ten small energy suppliers had ceased trading or been taken over by others, and others followed similar paths until the market turbulence in the autumn of 2021.

2016 to 2020
Company	Ceased trading	Customers (approx.)	Customers transferred to
Affect Energy	September 2018	22,000	Octopus Energy (acquisition)
Breeze Energy	December 2019	18,000	British Gas
Brilliant Energy	March 2019	17,000	SSE
Bristol Energy	September 2020	155,000 domestic, 4,000 business	Business: Yü Energy Domestic: Together Energy
Economy Energy	January 2019	235,000	OVO Energy
ENGIE UK	January 2020	70,000	Octopus Energy (acquisition of ENGIE's domestic UK customers)
Eversmart Energy	September 2019	39,000 domestic	Utilita Energy Limited
Extra Energy	November 2018	108,000 domestic, 21,000 business	ScottishPower
Flow Energy	May 2018	130,000	Co-op Energy (acquisition); Brand continued until acquired by Octopus in 2019
Future Energy	January 2018	10,000	Green Star Energy
GB Energy Supply	November 2016	160,000	Co-op Energy (acquisition); Brand continued until acquired by Octopus in 2019
Green Star Energy	October 2019	200,000	Shell Energy (acquisition); Green Star was a subsidiary of Canada's Just Energy
Iresa	July 2018	100,000	Octopus Energy
OneSelect	December 2018	36,000	Together Energy
Our Power	January 2019	31,000	Utilita Energy
Robin Hood Energy	September 2020	112,000 domestic, 2,600 business	British Gas
Solarplicity	August 2019	60,000	EDF Energy
Spark Energy	November 2018	290,000	OVO Energy
Tonik Energy	October 2020	130,000	ScottishPower
Toto Energy	October 2019	134,000	EDF Energy
Usio Energy	October 2018	7,000	First Utility
Yorkshire Energy	December 2020	74,000	ScottishPower
National Gas and Power Limited	25/07/2018	22,000	Hudson Energy
Gen4U	13/09/2018	500	Octopus Energy
Cardiff Energy Supply	09/08/2019	800	SSE
Uttily Energy	15/10/2019	280 business customers	Total Gas and Power
GnERGY	18/03/2020	9,000	Bulb Energy
Go Effortless Energy	03/09/2020	2,500	Octopus Energy

==== 2021–2022 ====
Sharp increases in wholesale gas prices in summer and autumn 2021, and a consequent increase in wholesale electricity prices, led to further collapses. High prices continued into 2022. Ofgem continued to arrange for customers of those companies to be transferred to other suppliers, but when Bulb Energy failed in November 2021 a different approach was needed: with 1.7 million customers, it was the seventh biggest supplier company. Bulb was placed in "special administration" and the UK government undertook to cover its losses while a sale or restructuring was organised, with a potential cost to taxpayers of £1.7 billion.

2021-2022
Company	Ceased trading	Customers (approx.)	Customers transferred to
Zog Energy	1 December 2021	11,700	EDF Energy
Simplicity Energy	January 2021	50,000	British Gas Evolve
Green Network Energy	January 2021	360,000	EDF
Ampoweruk Ltd	2 November 2021, finalised 3 November	600 or 2,600	Yü Energy
Omni Energy	3 November 2021	under 10,000	Utilita
MA Energy	3 November 2021	under 10,000	SmartestEnergy Business Limited
Neon Reef	16 November 2021	30,000	British Gas
Social Energy Supply	16 November 2021	5,500	British Gas
CNG-Power	3 November 2021	under 10,000	Pozitive Energy
Zebra Energy	3 November 2021	under 10,000	British Gas
Bluegreen	1 November 2021, finalised 3 November	5,600	British Gas
Avro Energy	22 September 2021	580,000	Octopus Energy
Colorado Energy	13 October 2021	15,000	Shell Energy
Daligas	14 October 2021	9,000	Shell Energy
ENSTROGA	29 September 2021	6,000	E.ON Next
Green Supplier Limited	22 September 2021	255,000	Shell Energy
GOTO Energy	18 October 2021	22,000	Shell Energy
Hub Energy	9 August 2021	6,000 domestic, 9,000 others	E.ON Next
Igloo Energy	29 September 2021	179,000	E.ON Next
MoneyPlus Energy	7 September 2021	9,000	British Gas
People's Energy	14 September 2021	350,000 domestic, 1,000 others	British Gas
PFP Energy	7 September 2021	82,000 domestic, 5,600 others	British Gas PFP was Places for People Energy 2014–2017
Pure Planet	13 October 2021	235,000	Shell Energy
Symbio Energy	29 September 2021	48,000	E.ON Next
Together Energy (incl. Bristol Energy)	18 January 2022	176,000	British Gas
Utility Point	14 September 2021	220,000	EDF Energy
Bulb Energy	23 November 2021	1,700,000	Special Administration ProcessOctopus Energy
Orbit Energy	26 November 2021, finalised 29 November	65,000	Scottish Power
Entice Energy	26 November 2021	5,400	Scottish Power
Xcel Power Ltd	18/02/2022	274	Yü Energy
Whoop Energy	18/02/2022	262	Yü Energy

==== 2023–2024 ====
No significant company failures.

==== 2025 onwards ====
2025 onwards
Company	Ceased trading	Customers (approx.)	Customers transferred to
Rebel Energy	2 April 2025	80,000 domestic and 10,000 business customers	British Gas

== See also ==
- Energy in the United Kingdom
- Energy policy of the United Kingdom
- Energy switching services in the UK
- Electricity sector in the United Kingdom
- Office of Gas and Electricity Markets § Development of competition in the UK market
