= Bristol Energy =

Energy supply company in England

Bristol Energy Limited
- Company type: Limited Company
- Industry: Utilities
- Predecessor: Bristol Energy Limited (Bristol City Council owned company) No. 09135084
- Founded: 2 November 2015 in Bristol, England
- Fate: Business sold in multiple parts to Yü Energy, Together Energy and F&S Energy
- Successor: Bristol Energy Limited No. 10167186 previously named Together Energy Supply Limited
- Headquarters: Altrincham, Greater Manchester, England.
- Area served: United Kingdom
- Products: Gas; Electricity; Renewable Energy
- Revenue: ▲£76.2 million (2019); ▲£52.5 million (2018); ▲£13.7 million (2017)
- Net income: ▲£(10.1) million (2019); ▼£(10.3) million (2018); ▼£(8.4) million (2017)
- Owner: Warrington Borough Council and Paul Scott Richards
- Number of employees: ▲200 (2019); ▲161 (2018)
- Parent: Together Energy Limited
- Website: www.bristol-energy.co.uk

Bristol Energy was a municipally owned energy supply company, founded in September 2015 by Bristol City Council. Its business accounts were sold to Yü Energy in August 2020, and in the following month its residential accounts were sold to Together Energy. In October 2020, F&S Energy purchased Bristol Energy's renewable energy generator portfolio, along with its commercial feed-in tariff customers.

The company supplied gas and electricity to domestic and business customers across the United Kingdom. In September 2020, Bristol Energy became a brand of Together Energy, until the latter ceased to trade in January 2022.

== History ==
Bristol City Council made a decision in principle to create such a company in 2010, as part of its Climate Change and Energy Security Framework. In February 2015 a business plan was produced, which was approved by the council cabinet in July 2015. The company began taking customers in February 2016.

In spring 2018 it lost the contract to supply energy to Bristol City Council after British Gas marginally undercut them on price.

In December 2018, employee number one and CEO Peter Haigh stood down and was replaced by Marek Majewicz, the company's finance director. In November 2018 Bristol Energy began supplying gas to Bristol City Council again, winning back part of the business it had lost to British Gas.

In January 2019, Bristol Energy announced it had received a €1.9m grant from the European Investment Bank and the European Commission to fund renewable energy, in partnership with Plymouth City Council. In that year, 79% of the company's energy supply was generated from renewable sources. In February 2019 it regained the contract to supply electricity to Bristol City Council.

In May 2019, Bristol Energy began a partnership with The Big Issue. In August 2019 the then CEO revealed the company had employed and continued to employ two people who were previously homeless.

In July 2019 the council's risk register entry on 'Long term commercial investments and major projects capital investment' which includes Bristol Energy had a high level risk rating, no comments were given on any risk treatments needed for the Bristol Energy part of the investments.

As of August 2019, the company had received some £37.7 million of funding from Bristol City Council and was not expected to be profitable until 2024.

In March 2020, Marek Majewicz departed as Managing and Finance Director and was replaced by Allan Booth, who has in the past listed his occupation as "turnaround expert". Booth's most recent directorship was at The Towcester Racecourse Company Limited, which entered administration in 2018 and was liquidated in 2019.

== Change of ownership ==
Bristol Energy was wholly owned by Bristol City Council through an intermediate holding company, Bristol Holding Limited (which also has Bristol Waste Company Limited as a subsidiary). In May 2020, Bristol Energy was put up for sale by Bristol City Council. In August of that year, 4,000 business customer accounts were sold to Yü Energy for £1.34 million plus taking on £580,000 of debt.

In September, Bristol Energy's brand and residential accounts – 155,000 meter points – were sold to Together Energy, whose parent Total Energy Limited was owned and controlled by Paul Scott Richards and Warrington Borough Council, for £14 million. Total Energy was established in 2016 and had headquarters in Glasgow and offices in Warrington; the transaction approximately doubled the size of Together Energy's operations. Following the sale to Together Energy, Richard Orna, formerly Head of Information Services at Bristol Energy, was appointed as its managing director.

In October 2020, F&S Energy purchased Bristol Energy's entire renewable energy generator portfolio (power purchase agreement contracts), along with its commercial feed-in tariff customers. The combined contracted capacity moving to F&S was circa 91 MW.

=== Subsequent events ===
On 2 October 2020, company No. 09135084 changed its name from Bristol Energy Limited to BE 2020 Limited, retaining any debts and liabilities; its parent company remains Bristol Holding Limited. In the same month, Warrington Borough Council loaned the parent company a further £4 million, secured against the parent and subsidiary companies.

Bristol Energy continued as a domestic brand of Together Energy. Company No. 10167186 was renamed from Together Energy Supply Limited to Bristol Energy Limited without retaining any of the debts of the company, No. 09135084, previously named Bristol Energy Limited.

Following sharp increases in wholesale gas and electricity prices which began in autumn 2021, unsuccessful attempts were made to obtain additional funding for Together Energy or to sell the business. With over £12 million due to Ofgem unpaid, Together Energy Retail Ltd announced on 18 January 2022 that it was ceasing to trade. The company's 176,000 domestic customers were shortly afterwards transferred to British Gas. It was reported that the collapse could cost Warrington Council up to £52 million.

== See also ==
Other companies created by local authorities:

- Robin Hood Energy
- London Power
