= Standard Oil Co. v. United States (Standard Stations) =

- Supreme Court of the United States

Argued March 3–4, 1949 Decided June 13, 1949
- Full case name: Standard Oil Co. v. United States
- Citations: 337 U.S. 293 (more) 69 S. Ct. 1051; 93 L. Ed. 2d 1371

Holding
- The Standard Oil Company is operating an illegal monopoly.

Court membership
- Chief Justice Fred M. Vinson Associate Justices Hugo Black · Stanley F. Reed; Felix Frankfurter · William O. Douglas; Frank Murphy · Robert H. Jackson; Wiley B. Rutledge · Harold H. Burton

Case opinions
- Majority: Frankfurter, joined by Black, Reed, Murphy, and Rutledge
- Dissent: Douglas
- Dissent: Jackson, joined by Vinson and Burton

Standard Oil Co. v. United States, 337 U.S. 293 (1949), more commonly referred to as the Standard Stations case to distinguish it from a 1911 case with the same caption, Standard Oil Co. v. United States, is a 1947 decision of the United States Supreme Court in which requirements contracts for gasoline stations (Standard Stations) were held to violate section 3 of the Clayton Act. That statute prohibits selling goods on the condition that the customer must not deal in the goods of a competitor of the seller, such as in a requirements contract, if the effect is to "substantially lessen competition" or "tend to create a monopoly." The doctrine of this case has been referred to as "quantitative substantiality," and its exact contours were unsettled and controversial for many years until the Supreme Court authoritatively explained it in United States v. Philadelphia National Bank.

The importance of the decision and its place in antitrust jurisprudence have been characterized in these terms:

Standard Stations is the richest and the most difficult of all the vertical integration cases. Each of the tensions that has been mentioned within the structure of antitrust is revealed in the Standard Stations decision. As the leading case on integration by contract, it has been the subject of extensive commentary and controversy. The decision may raise as many problems as it settles, but the rule of Standard Stations is one which must be reckoned with in all vertical integration cases, and comprehension of this rule is essential to evaluation of the impact of antitrust upon integration.

The case has been the subject of extensive scholarly commentary.

== Background ==
Standard Stations logo

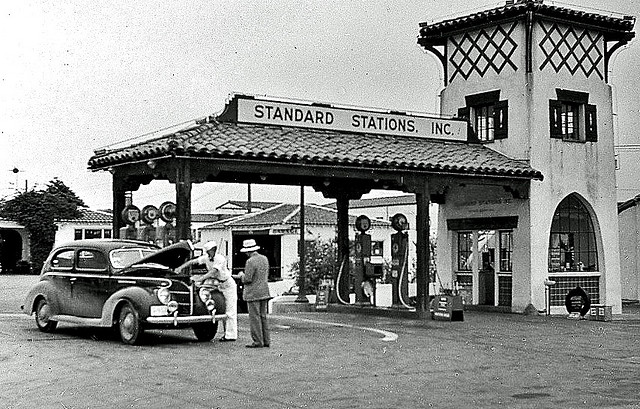
1939 photograph of Standard Stations filling station in California

Defendant Standard Stations, Inc., a wholly owned subsidiary of defendant Standard Oil Company of California (Socal) (now named Chevron Corporation), managed gasoline filling stations that Socal owned and leased to independent businessmen. It also supplied gasoline to locally owned and operated filling stations that used the Standard Stations brand name

The Standard Stations case involved the distribution of petroleum products and automobile accessories. The US oil industry had relatively few producers, each having substantial shares of the market. They were integrated with their retail outlets by requirements contracts. These contracts bound the retail outlets to obtain all of the products they sold from the integrating producer.

Defendant Standard's contracts covered 16 percent of all the retail gasoline outlets in the Western US, 6.7 percent of the gasoline sold in the Western US, and about $58 million in annual sales. Standard's sales through outlets that its parent owned and to industrial users brought its total share of the Western US gasoline market up to 23 percent, while its six leading competitors, who employed similar exclusive dealing arrangements, accounted for 42 percent of that market. Together, the seven major companies sold 65 percent of gasoline in the Western US. Industrial gasoline sales of the seven majors brought the total above 65 percent. In terms of retail outlets, the seven majors controlled 76 percent of all stations in the West.

The US Justice Department's Antitrust Division brought suit under section 1 of the Sherman Act and section 3 of the Clayton Act to enjoin Standard from entering into or enforcing these exclusive contracts. The district court found for the Government as to both sections 1 and 3. The defendants then appealed to the Supreme Court.

== Ruling of Supreme Court ==
=== Majority opinion ===
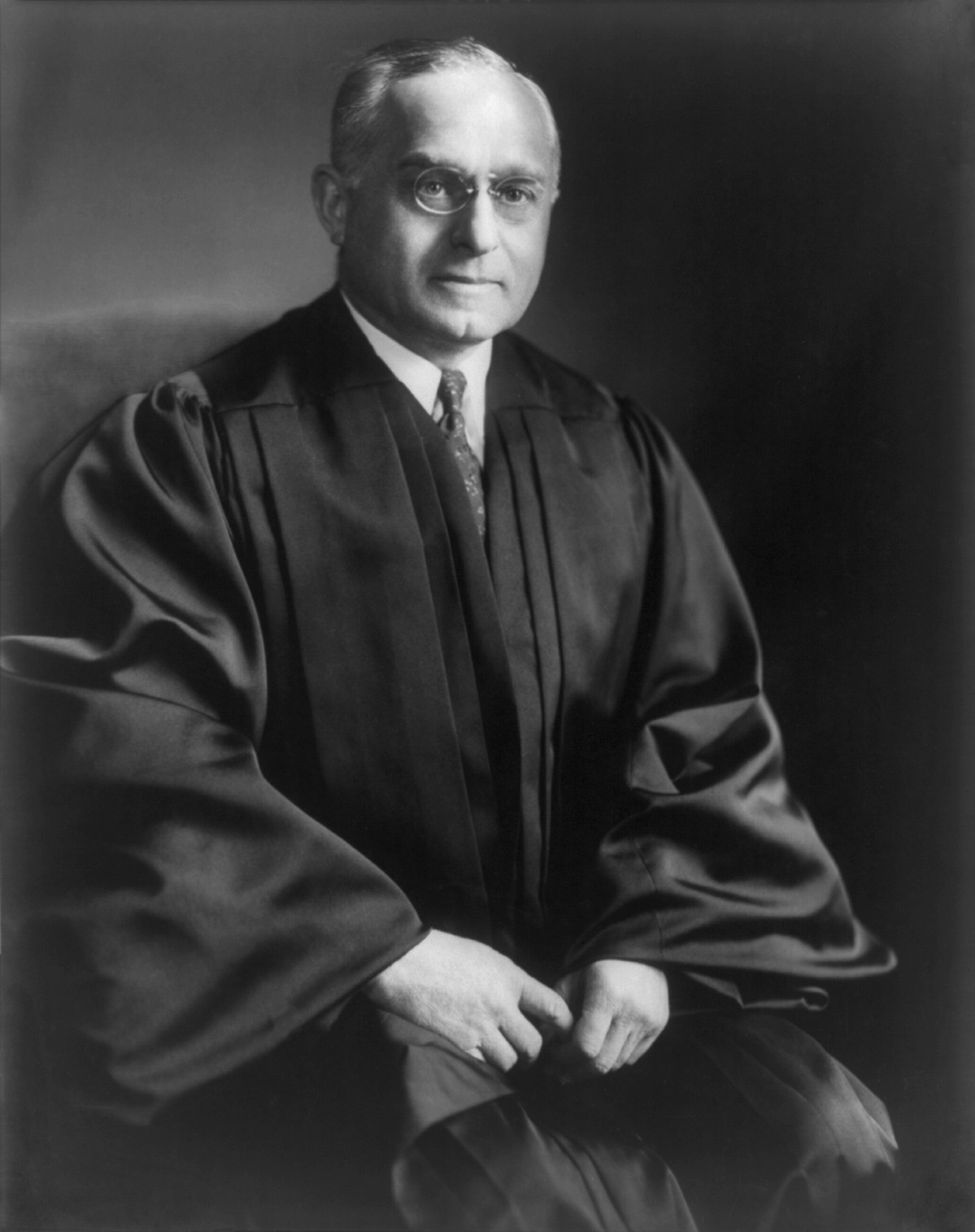
Justice Felix Frankfurter, author of the majority opinion

The majority opinion for the Court by Justice Frankfurter began by summarizing the opinion of the district court:

The District Court held that the requirement of showing an actual or potential lessening of competition or a tendency to establish monopoly was adequately met by proof that the contracts covered "a substantial number of outlets and a substantial amount of products, whether considered comparatively or not." Given such quantitative substantiality, the substantial lessening of competition -- so the court reasoned -- is an automatic result, for the very existence of such contracts denies dealers opportunity to deal in the products of competing suppliers and excludes suppliers from access to the outlets controlled by those dealers. Having adopted this standard of proof, the court excluded as immaterial testimony bearing on "the commercial merits or demerits of the present system as contrasted with a system which prevailed prior to its establishment and which would prevail if the court declared the present arrangement [invalid]."

The Court then said that the issue before it was "whether the requirement of showing that the effect of the agreements 'may be to substantially lessen competition' may be met simply by proof that a substantial portion of commerce is affected, or whether it must also be demonstrated that competitive activity has actually diminished or probably will diminish.

Preliminarily, the Court noted that the only two prior Supreme Court cases finding requirements contracts unlawful were not helpful, because they involved defendants with dominant market positions. The present case, the Court said, was not identical:

It is thus apparent that none of these cases controls the disposition of the present appeal, for Standard's share of the retail market for gasoline, even including sales through company-owned stations, is hardly large enough to conclude as a matter of law that it occupies a dominant position, nor did the trial court so find. The cases do indicate, however, that some sort of showing as to the actual or probable economic consequences of the agreements, if only the inferences to be drawn from the fact of dominant power, is important, and, to that extent, they tend to support appellant's position.

In addition, in another two cases, no violation was found because dealers could readily sell other or additional brands of gasoline in one case and in the other case no anticompetive effects occurred. In contrast, the Standard Stations Court said, "The present case differs, of course, in the fact that a dealer who has entered a requirements contract with Standard cannot, consistently with that contract, sell the petroleum products of a competitor of Standard's."

"But then came," the Court said, the most recent exclusive dealing case, International Salt Co. v. United States, 332 U. S. 392 (1947), a patent tying case, in which the country's largest producer of industrial salt sold about $500,000 worth of salt for use in its patented machines, while imposing contracts requiring the customers to use no other company's salt. The finding of illegality in that case tended to suggest illegality here:

It is clear therefore that, unless a distinction is to be drawn for purposes of the applicability of § 3 between requirements contracts and contracts tying the sale of a nonpatented to a patented product, the showing that Standard's requirements contracts affected a gross business of $58,000,000 comprising 6.7% of the total in the area goes far toward supporting the inference that competition has been or probably will be substantially lessened.

The Court then distinguished the economic setting and impact of tie-ins and requirements contracts, concluding that it was inappropriate to use the same legal standard for both. Tie-ins serve little purpose "beyond the suppression of competition," but requirements contracts:

may well be of economic advantage to buyers as well as to sellers, and thus indirectly of advantage to the consuming public. In the case of the buyer, they may assure supply, afford protection against rises in price, enable long-term planning on the basis of known costs, and obviate the expense and risk of storage in the quantity necessary for a commodity having a fluctuating demand. From the seller's point of view, requirements contracts may make possible the substantial reduction of selling expenses, give protection against price fluctuations, and—of particular advantage to a newcomer to the field to whom it is important to know what capital expenditures are justified—offer the possibility of a predictable market. ... Since these advantages of requirements contracts may often be sufficient to account for their use, the coverage by such contracts of a substantial amount of business affords a weaker basis for the inference that competition may be lessened than would similar coverage by tying clauses, especially where use of the latter is combined with market control of the tying device.

The court mentioned four tests that might apply if a "rule of reason" approach were to be used in which a showing was to be made that competition "has actually diminished or probably will diminish":

- whether "competition has flourished despite use of the contracts"
- "the conformity of the length of their term to the reasonable requirements of [business]"
- "the status of the defendant as a struggling newcomer or an established competitor" and
- "perhaps most important . . . defendant's degree of market control."

The Court rejected these tests on three grounds:

- Their use would run counter to the legislative mandate. The investigation required "would . . . stultify the force of Congress' statutory declaration (in § 3) that requirements contracts are to be prohibited whenever their "effect may be to substantially lessen competition."
- Moreover, "serious difficulties [of economic analysis] would attend the attempt to apply these tests," and the task would prove one "most ill-suited for . . . courts."
- Finally, the tests are inconclusive, since lack of anticompetitive effect is no proof that, but for the integration system, competition in the industry would not have been even keener.

The Court recognized that "may substantially lessen" in § 3 did not call for finding a violation if there was a mere possibility of lessening competition. There had to be a likelihood, which in this case was established by the market setting:

When it is remembered that all the other major suppliers have also been using requirements contracts, and when it is noted that the relative share of the business which fell to each has remained about the same during the period of their use, it would not be farfetched to infer that their effect has been to enable the established suppliers individually to maintain their own standing and at the same time collectively, even though not collusively, to prevent a late arrival from wresting away more than an insignificant portion of the market.

The Court therefore turned to a market power test. Under this test, there is a violation when "a substantial portion of commerce is affected," that is, when "competition has been foreclosed in a substantial share of the line of commerce." The Court then applied this test to the facts of the Standard Stations case:

[O]bservance by a dealer of his requirements contract with Standard does effectively foreclose whatever opportunity there might be for competing suppliers to attract his patronage. . . .[I]n view of the widespread adoption of such contracts by Standard's competitors . . . Standard's use of the contracts creates just such a potential clog on competition as it was the purpose of § 3 to remove.

=== Douglas dissent ===
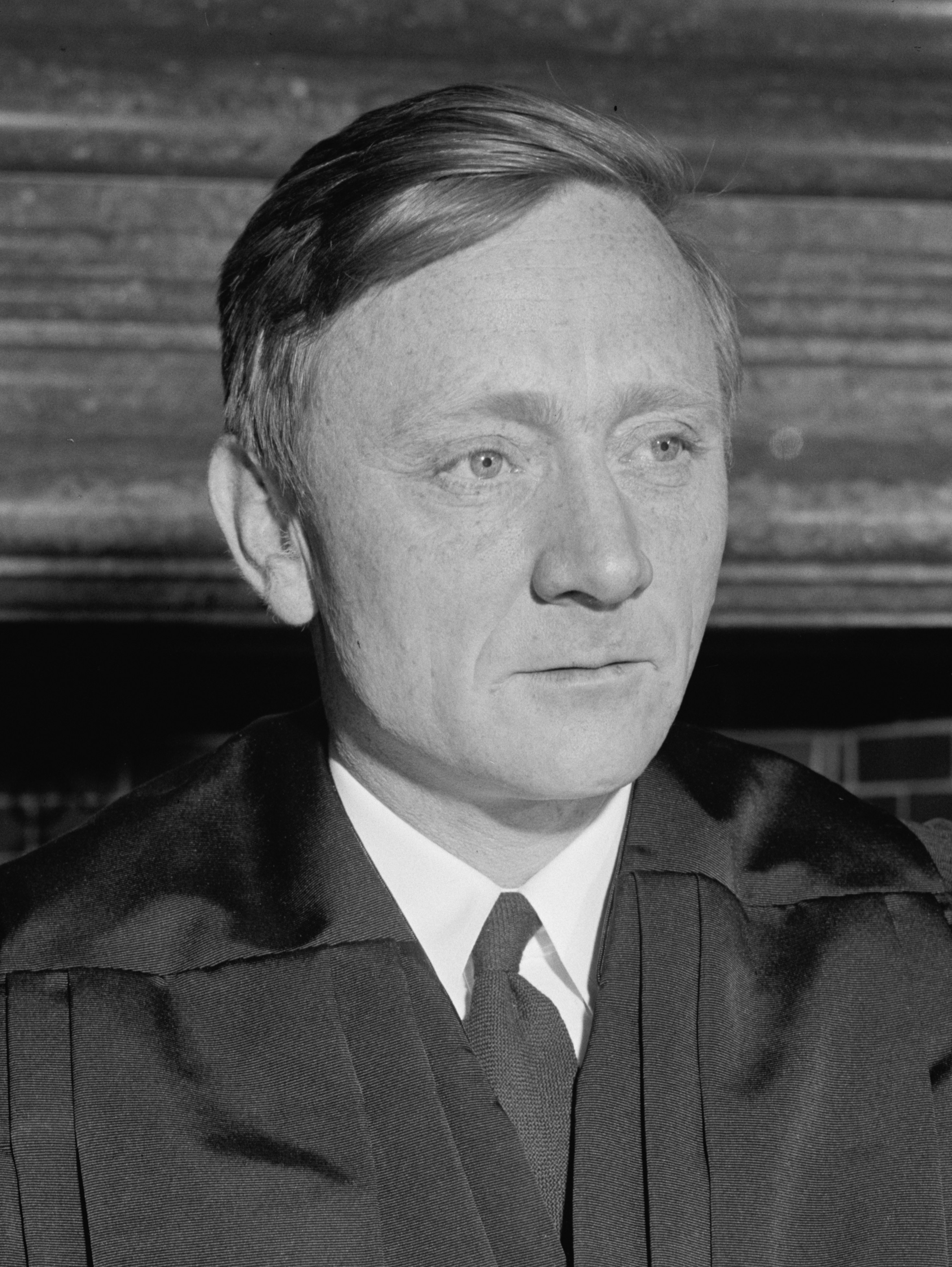
Justice Douglas

Justice Douglas argued in favor of Standard's requirement contracts. He said that condemning them would drive Standard into vertical integration by agency or by outright ownership of the stations. Under legal interpretations then prevalent, those types of business integration were "subject to a much more lenient antitrust standard than contract integration." The effect would be to turn entrepreneurs into clerks, causing dilution of "local leadership" and a "serious loss in citizenship" to the "village." Douglas warned that disallowing these requirements contracts would turn a bad situation into a worse one: "Clerks responsible to a superior in a distant place [will] take the place of resident proprietors beholden to no one."

He concluded with this warning:

The requirements contract which is displaced is relatively innocuous as compared with the virulent growth of monopoly power which the Court encourages. The Court does not act unwittingly. It consciously pushes the oil industry in that direction. The Court approves what the Anti-Trust Laws were designed to prevent. It helps remake America in the image of the cartels.

=== Jackson dissent ===
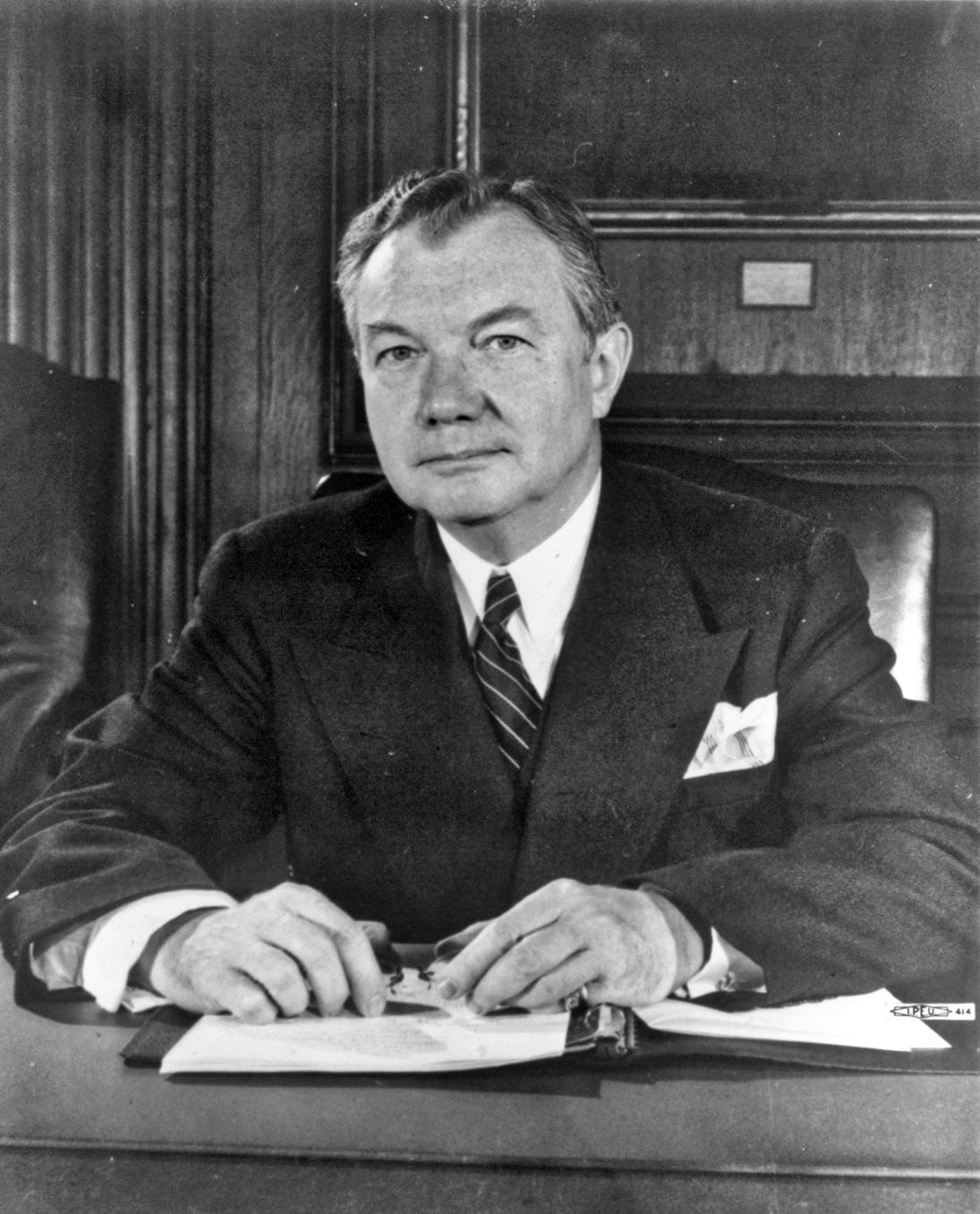
Justice Robert H. Jackson

Justice Jackson challenged the majority's inference that competition may be substantially lessened merely because a large majority of the market is foreclosed by requirements contracts, including those of Standard. Thus while the majority said it was not farfetched to move from foreclosure to a likelihood of lessening of competition, Jackson insisted that it was farfetched to do so: "But proof of their quantity does not prove that they had this forbidden quality; and the assumption that they did, without proof, seems to me unwarranted."

Jackson saw the market as an already imperfect one in oligopolists battle it out with one another for market share, using the dealers as pawns, "the instrumentalities through which competition . . . is waged." He explained:

[T]he retailer in this industry is only a conduit from the oil fields to the driver's tank, a means by which the oil companies compete to get the business of the ultimate consumer—the man in whose automobile the gas is used. It means to me, if I must decide without evidence, that these contracts are an almost necessary means to maintain this all-important competition for consumer business, in which it is admitted competition is keen. The retail stations, whether independent or company-owned, are the instrumentalities through which competition for this ultimate market is waged.

Jackson considered that exclusive dealing is an offsetting market imperfection that increases competition. He therefore dissented from holding Standard's contracts unlawful. He said, "If the courts are to apply the lash of the antitrust laws to the backs of businessmen to make them compete, we cannot in fairness also apply the lash whenever they hit upon a successful method of competing."

== Subsequent developments ==
A number of commentators and some courts have interpreted the Standard Stations case as holding that a 6.7 percent foreclosure of the market is "quantitatively substantial" and therefore sufficient to support a judgment of violation of Clayton Act § 3. But subsequent case developments in the Supreme Court are inconsistent with that interpretation.

=== Philadelphia Bank case ===
In United States v. Philadelphia National Bank, the Court explained what it considered the holding in the Standard Stations case:

In [Standard Stations] this Court held violative of § 3 of the Clayton Act exclusive contracts whereby the defendant company, which accounted for 23% of the sales in the relevant market and, together with six other firms, accounted for 65% of such sales, maintained control over outlets through which approximately 7% of the sales were made.

The Court then compared that fact pattern with the case before it, in which "the four largest banks after the merger will foreclose 78% of the relevant market," and it found a Clayton Act violation based on the inference that the effect "may be to substantially lessen competition." This analysis suggests that the Court considered the basis of the violation in Standard Stations to be the "collective although not collusive" foreclosure of 65% rather than the defendant's approximately 7%.

=== Tampa Electric case ===
In Tampa Electric Co. v. Nashville Coal Co., 365 U.S. 320 (1961), the Court again addressed § 3. Nashville sought to invalidate its 20-year requirements contract with Tampa for coal. The contract covered less than 1% of the total amount of coal of the same type produced and marketed by the 700 coal suppliers in the coal producing area. The district court and court of appeals found a § 3 violation on the basis that one million tons of coal per year and $128 million worth of coal over the 20 years were substantial enough so that the effect of the contract would "be to substantially lessen competition," in violation of the Clayton Act.

The Supreme Court reversed. Addressing Standard Stations the Court said:

It held that such contracts are proscribed by § 3 if their practical effect is to prevent lessees or purchasers from using or dealing in the goods, etc., of a competitor or competitors of the lessor or seller, and thereby "competition has been foreclosed in a substantial share of the line of commerce affected." In practical application, even though a contract is found to be an exclusive dealing arrangement, it does not violate the section unless the court believes it probable that performance of the contract will foreclose competition in a substantial share of the line of commerce affected. . . ."[A] purely quantitative measure of this effect is inadequate, because the narrower the area of competition, the greater the comparative effect on the area's competitors. Since it is the preservation of competition which is at stake, the significant proportion of coverage is that within the area of effective competition." [Quoting Standard Stations]

[T]he competition foreclosed by the contract must be found to constitute a substantial share of the relevant market. That is to say, the opportunities for other traders to enter into or remain in that market must be significantly limited, as was pointed out in [Standard Stations]. There, the impact of the requirements contracts was studied in the setting of the large number of gasoline stations—5,937, or 16% of the retail outlets in the relevant market—and the large number of contracts, over 8,000, together with the great volume of products involved. This combination dictated a finding that "Standard's use of the contracts [created] just such a potential clog on competition as it was the purpose of § 3 to remove" where, as there, the affected proportion of retail sales was substantial.

In applying these considerations to the facts of the case before us, it appears clear that both the Court of Appeals and the District Court have not given the required effect to a controlling factor in the case -- the relevant competitive market area. . . .[I]t clearly appears that the proportionate volume of the total relevant coal product as to which the challenged contract preempted competition, less than 1%, is, conservatively speaking, quite insubstantial. A more accurate figure, even assuming preemption to the extent of the maximum anticipated total requirements, 2,250,000 tons a year, would be .77%. . . . While $128,000,000 is a considerable sum of money, even in these days, the dollar volume, by itself, is not the test, as we have already pointed out.

[T]he relevant coal market . . . sees an annual trade in excess of 250,000,000 tons of coal and over a billion dollars—multiplied by 20 years, it runs into astronomical figures. There is here neither a seller with a dominant position in the market, . . . nor myriad outlets with substantial sales volume, coupled with an industry-wide practice of relying upon exclusive contracts, as in [Standard Stations]. On the contrary, we seem to have only that type of contract which "may well be of economic advantage to buyers, as well as to sellers." [Citing Standard Stations] . . . In weighing the various factors, we have decided that, in the competitive bituminous coal marketing area involved here, the contract sued upon does not tend to foreclose a substantial volume of competition.

As in the Philadelphia Bank case, the Court here does not interpret Standard Stations to hold that 6.7% of sales in a market or a corresponding dollar amount supports a finding that a requirements contract may substantially lessen competition.
