= TECO Energy =

Energy Company

- Type: Subsidiary
- Industry: Electric & Gas Utilities
- Founded: 1899
- Headquarters: Tampa, Florida, United States
- Area served: Florida
- Key people: Archie Collins (CEO Tampa Electric Company); Helen Wesley (President Peoples Gas Company)
- Number of employees: 3,713
- Parent: Emera
- Website: www.tecoenergy.com

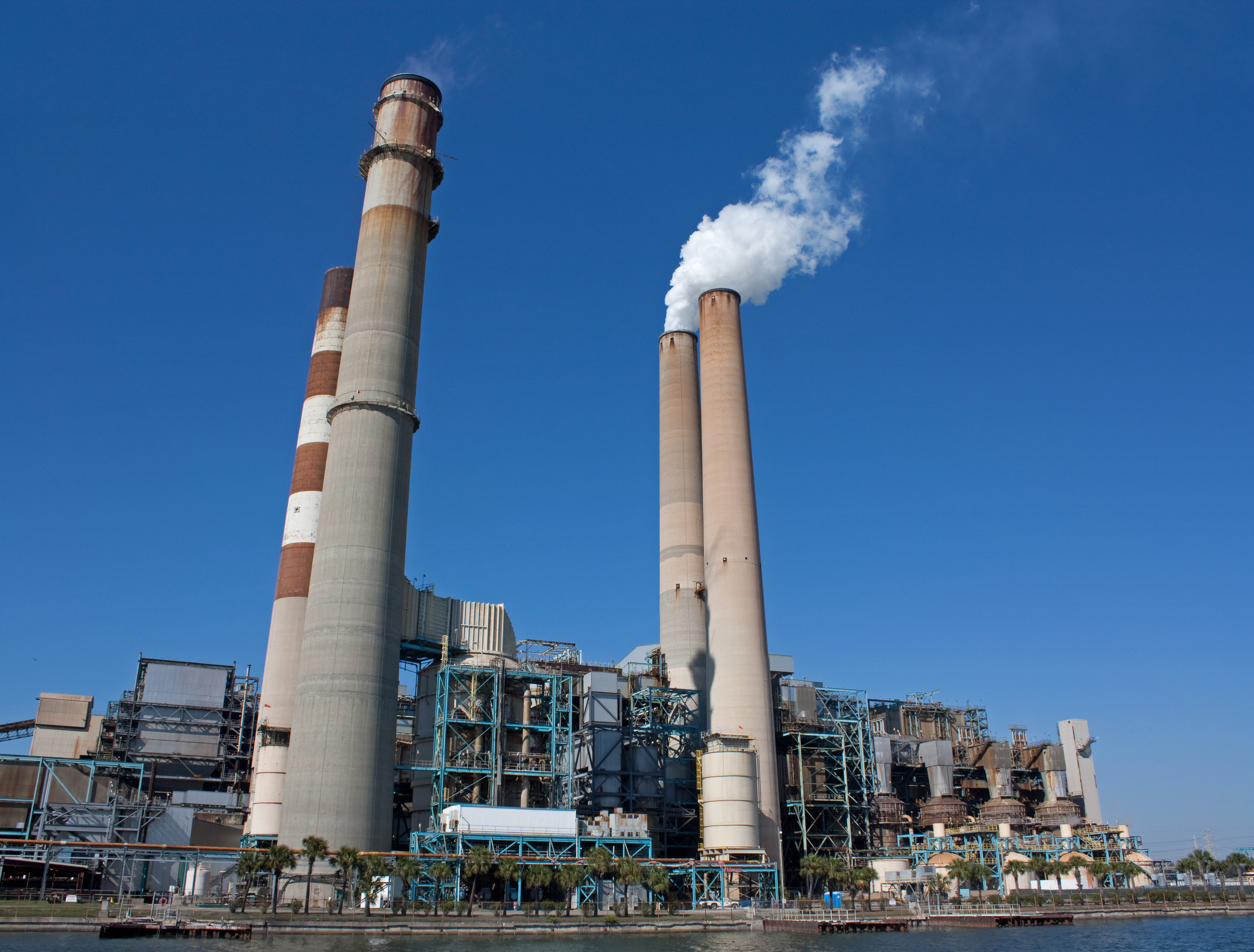
TECO's Big Bend Power Station

TECO Energy Inc. is an energy-related holding company based in Tampa, Florida, and a subsidiary of Emera Incorporated. TECO Energy has several subsidiaries: Tampa Electric, which provides electricity to the Tampa Bay Area and parts of Central Florida; Peoples Gas Company, (Note: no relation to the Chicago-based company of the same name) which provides natural gas throughout Florida; and TECO Services, which provides IT, HR, legal, facilities, and other services to current and former TECO subsidiaries. Previously the company was in the S&P 500 before it became private due its acquisition by Emera.

Tampa Electric is one of Florida’s largest investor-owned electric utilities. It serves more than 830,000 customers in West Central Florida.

Peoples Gas System Inc. is Florida’s largest natural gas distribution utility, serving nearly 470,000 homes and businesses across the state.

== History ==
In 1899, Colonel Peter O. Knight created Tampa Electric Company to serve the energy needs of a growing Tampa community.

In 1903, a steam generating plant, renamed the Peter O. Knight Station in 1969, was built on Jackson Street, and by 1906, the first turbo-generator was installed. At the dawn of the 20th Century, Tampa Electric Company promoted such conveniences as electric lights and fans, and over more than 20 miles of track connecting Tampa, Ybor City and Ballast Point.

Modern downtown offices were opened in 1914 at the corner of Cass and Tampa Street. At the end of the century, Tampa Electric and parent company, TECO Energy, employed more than 5,000 men and women in six states and South America.

On September 4, 2015, Emera, a utility holding company based in Halifax, Nova Scotia, Canada, announced the pending acquisition of TECO Energy. That purchase closed on July 1, 2016, and TECO Energy, Inc. became a wholly owned subsidiary of Emera, Inc.

== Environmental record ==
In late 2021, Tampa Electric announced its vision for its power plants to achieve a net zero carbon emission future by 2050.

As part of its initiative, Tampa Electric will increase the use of zero/low-carbon technologies, which will improve renewable energy capabilities. Tampa Electric plans to invest in emerging technologies, such as carbon capture, biofuels, hydrogen, wind turbines and battery storage. The utility will pilot new concepts, such as delivering renewable energy at the community level and will continue its partnership with the University of South Florida to develop innovative ideas and technologies to aid its pursuit of a net zero future.

In addition to pursuing emerging technologies and concepts, Tampa Electric will continue working to improve existing power stations through improved technology and move away from coal usage. For example, Big Bend’s Unit 1 will become a combined-cycle natural gas unit. The modernization of power plants improves the generation efficiency of fuel, lowering both emissions and fuel costs for customers.

Tampa Electric invested $5 million in 2022 to the University of South Florida's College of Engineering's Clean Energy Research Center in an effort to meet its target of having net-zero carbon emissions by 2050.

Researchers at the University of Massachusetts Amherst in 2006 identified TECO Energy as the 37th-largest corporate producer of air pollution in the United States in 2002, with roughly 11 million pounds of toxic chemicals released annually into the air. Major pollutants indicated by the study included hydrochloric acid, sulfuric acid, chromium compounds, arsenic compounds, and nickel compounds.

In 2000, TECO Energy was fined $3.5 million for making changes to emissions producing facilities without installing new updated pollution controls. This led to the switch from coal to natural gas in one of its plants by 2004 and optimization of pollution controls in another. These changes were enacted to drastically cut emissions, notably sulfur dioxide and nitrogen oxide emissions.

On July 6, 2019, People's Gas, a division of Tampa Electric Company, was accused of causing an explosion at a shopping center in Plantation, Florida, known as the Market on University. The allegations by plaintiff’s attorneys claim People's Gas failed to close and lock a gas line after a customer request dating back to December 2018. The failure to close and lock the gas line is a violation of Federal law and Florida law. Peoples/TECO claims that a computer program cancelled the shutoff order unbeknownst to the utility. The computer error caused hundreds of gas line shutoff orders to be cancelled system wide. TECO/Peoples also blame the owner of the shopping center for not capping the gas line when the tenant removed a gas pizza oven. Over 60 lawsuits were filed in response to the explosion many of which remain pending.

In 2017, TECO had an explosion at its Big Bend power plant near Tampa, Florida killing five workers who were performing a dangerous procedure water jetting molten slag in a coal fired furnace. The workers were killed because an explosion occurred. TECO experienced the same type of accident 10 years prior and developed a policy to prevent future accidents but allegedly failed to train workers on the safety policy. In May 2022, TECO pleaded guilty to violating an OSHA safety regulation requiring a meeting to ensure workers are properly trained that would have prevented the deaths of the 5 workers. In August 2022 TECO was sentenced to a $500,000 fine and 3 years of probation. TECO admitted that it willfully violated an OSHA safety regulation as part of its guilty plea.

== See also ==
- List of power stations in Florida
- TECO Line Streetcar (No longer operated by TECO)
- Tampa Electric Co. v. Nashville Coal Co.
