= Tampa Electric Co. v. Nashville Coal Co. =

- Supreme Court of the United States

Argued December 15, 1960 Decided February 27, 1961
- Full case name: Tampa Electric Co. v. Nashville Coal Co.
- Citations: 365 U.S. 320 (more) 81 S. Ct. 623; 5 L. Ed. 2d 580

Case history
- Prior: 168 F. Supp. 456 (M.D. Tenn. 1958); affirmed, 276 F.2d 766 (6th Cir. 1960).
- Subsequent: 214 F. Supp. 647 (M.D. Tenn. 1963)

Court membership
- Chief Justice Earl Warren Associate Justices Hugo Black · Felix Frankfurter; William O. Douglas · Tom C. Clark; John M. Harlan II · William J. Brennan Jr. Charles E. Whittaker · Potter Stewart

Case opinion
- Majority: Clark

Laws applied
- Clayton Antitrust Act, 15 U.S.C. § 14

Tampa Electric Co. v. Nashville Coal Co., 365 U.S. 320 (1961), the Tampa Electric case, was a 1961 decision of the Supreme Court that, together with United States v. Philadelphia National Bank, clarified the legal test for determining whether requirements contracts "may substantially lessen competition" or "tend to create a monopoly" for purposes of section 3 of the Clayton Antitrust Act.

== Background ==
Tampa Electric, an electricity generating utility in Florida, decided to switch from burning oil to burning coal as boiler fuel at one of its new generating stations. It entered into a 20-year total requirements contract with Nashville Coal for the supply of coal at the station. Shortly before the first coal was actually to be delivered, Tampa Electric, to equip its first units for the use of coal, spent about $3 million more than the cost of constructing oil-burning units. At that point, Nashville Coal advised Tampa Electric that the contract was illegal under the antitrust laws and so would not be performed. No coal would be delivered. Tampa Electric was then obliged to procure its coal elsewhere.

According to the Supreme Court, there were some 700 coal suppliers in the producing area where Nashville Coal operated, and Tampa Electric's anticipated maximum requirements at the new station "would approximate 1% of the total coal of the same type produced and marketed" in that area.

Tampa sued Nashville to enforce the contract. The District Court granted summary judgment in Nashville's favor, and the Court of Appeals affirmed.

Both courts compared the estimated coal tonnage as to which the contract pre-empted competition for 20 years, 1 million tons a year by 1961, with the previous annual consumption of peninsular Florida, 700,000 tons. Emphasizing that fact and the contract value of the coal covered by the 20-year term, $128 million, both courts held that such volume was not "insignificant or insubstantial" and so the effect of the contract would "be to substantially lessen competition" in violation of Section 3 of the Clayton Act.

Tampa then sought further review in the Supreme Court.

== Decision ==
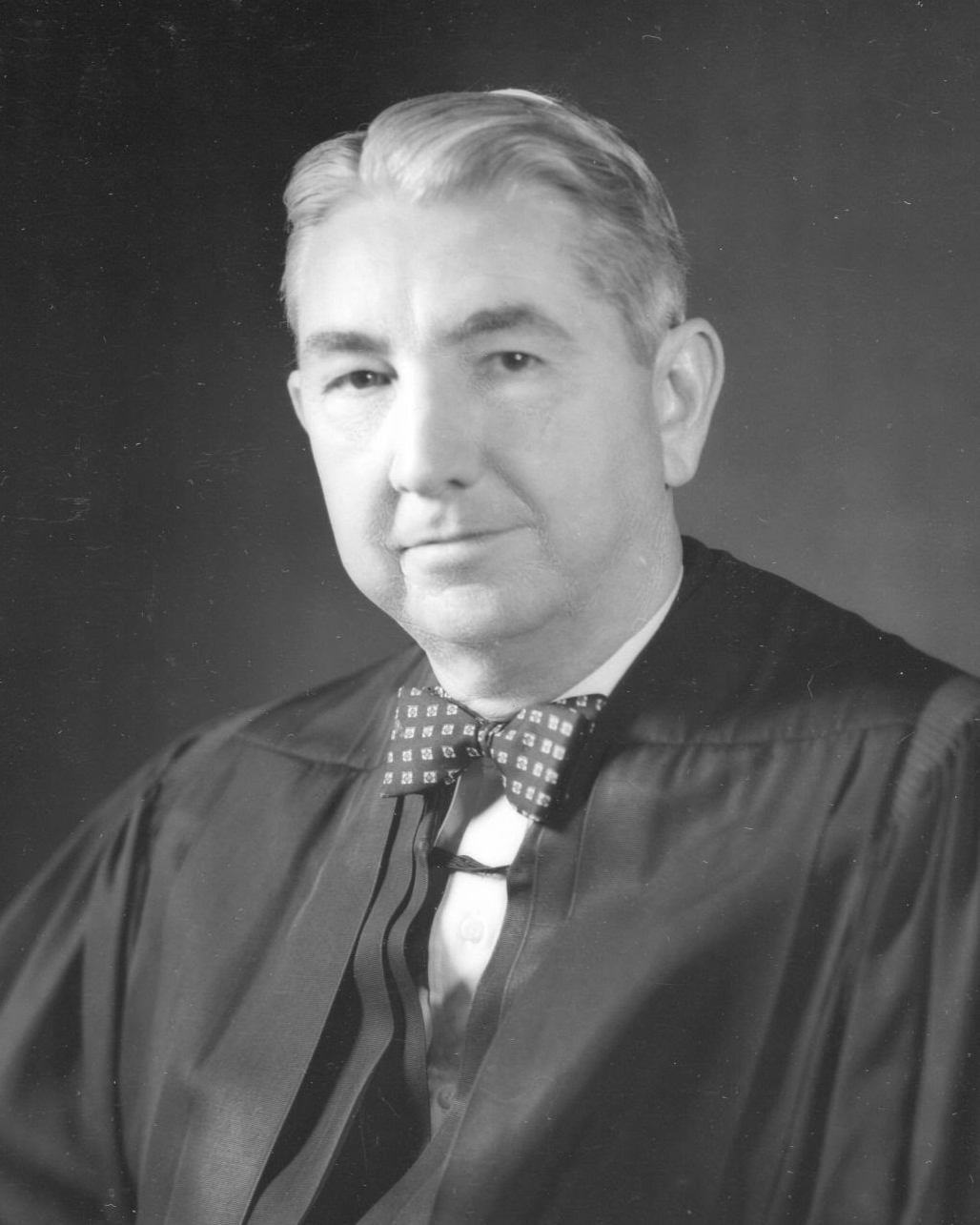
Justice Tom Clark

The Court, in a 7-2 opinion written by Justice Tom C. Clark, reversed and turned to the Standard Stations case for guidance:

[Standard Stations] held that such contracts are proscribed by § 3 if their practical effect is to prevent lessees or purchasers from using or dealing in the goods, etc., of a competitor or competitors of the lessor or seller, and thereby "competition has been foreclosed in a substantial share of the line of commerce affected." In practical application, even though a contract is found to be an exclusive dealing arrangement, it does not violate the section unless the court believes it probable that performance of the contract will foreclose competition in a substantial share of the line of commerce affected.

The Court then directly quoted Standard Stations:

[A] purely quantitative measure of this effect is inadequate, because the narrower the area of competition, the greater the comparative effect on the area's competitors. Since it is the preservation of competition which is at stake, the significant proportion of coverage is that within the area of effective competition.

The court said that meant that it was necessary to evaluate the contract in terms of its magnitude in the relevant market:

[T]he competition foreclosed by the contract must be found to constitute a substantial share of the relevant market. That is to say, the opportunities for other traders to enter into or remain in that market must be significantly limited, as was pointed out in [Standard Stations]. There, the impact of the requirements contracts was studied in the setting of the large number of gasoline stations—5,937, or 16% of the retail outlets in the relevant market—and the large number of contracts, over 8,000, together with the great volume of products involved. This combination dictated a finding that "Standard's use of the contracts [created] just such a potential clog on competition as it was the purpose of § 3 to remove" where, as there, the affected proportion of retail sales was substantial.

The Court found that the two lower courts had focused on an artificially-narrow relevant market, Florida, rather than much of the Eastern United States,) which was not the area of effective competition:

In applying these considerations to the facts of the case before us, it appears clear that both the Court of Appeals and the District Court have not given the required effect to a controlling factor in the case—the relevant competitive market area. . . .[I]t clearly appears that the proportionate volume of the total relevant coal product as to which the challenged contract preempted competition, less than 1%, is, conservatively speaking, quite insubstantial. A more accurate figure, even assuming preemption to the extent of the maximum anticipated total requirements, 2,250,000 tons a year, would be .77%. . . . While $128,000,000 is a considerable sum of money, even in these days, the dollar volume, by itself, is not the test, as we have already pointed out. [T]he relevant coal market . . . sees an annual trade in excess of 250,000,000 tons of coal and over a billion dollars—multiplied by 20 years, it runs into astronomical figures. There is here neither a seller with a dominant position in the market, . . . nor myriad outlets with substantial sales volume, coupled with an industry-wide practice of relying upon exclusive contracts, as in [Standard Stations]. On the contrary, we seem to have only that type of contract which "may well be of economic advantage to buyers, as well as to sellers." [Citing Standard Stations]

The Court rejected the view of Standard Stations that 6.7 percent of the market was enough to make a contract illegal and concluded:

In weighing the various factors, we have decided that, in the competitive bituminous coal marketing area involved here, the contract sued upon does not tend to foreclose a substantial volume of competition.

Justices Black and Douglas dissented without giving an opinion.

== Aftermath ==
Later court decisions have relied on Tampa Electric to provide guidance on how to determine the relevant market in which competitive impact should be measured. For example, in White & White, Inc. v. American Hosp. Supply Corp., the Sixth Circuit instructed:

Accordingly, the proper criteria for defining a geographic market is that "area in which the seller operates, and to which the purchaser can practicably turn for supply." (Citing Tampa Elec., 365 U.S. at 327.) While that area is not ordinarily susceptible to a "metes and bounds definition," it is the area in which "producers effectively compete."

In Apani Southwest, Inc. v. Coca-Cola Enterprises, the Fifth Circuit explained the Supreme Court's analysis in Tampa:

When assessing whether an exclusive-dealing arrangement has the probable effect of substantially lessening competition, the Supreme Court has identified a three-part inquiry. Tampa Elec. First, the relevant product market must be identified by considering interchangeability and cross-elasticity of demand. Second, the relevant geographic market must be identified, "by careful selection of the market area in which the seller operates and to which the purchaser can practicably turn for supplies." Id. Finally, a plaintiff must show that the "competition foreclosed by the arrangement constitutes a 'substantial share of the relevant market.'" Id. That is, "the opportunities for other traders to enter into or remain in that market must be significantly limited."
