= Co-op Energy =

British energy supply company

Co-operative Energy Limited
- Type: Private subsidiary company of an Industrial and Provident Society
- Industry: Public utility
- Founded: 2010
- Products: Gas and electricity supply
- Parent: The Midcounties Co-operative
- Website: energy.yourcoop.coop

Co-op Energy is a membership-owned British energy supply company based in Warwick that began trading in 2010. It sells renewable electricity (some from community-owned sources) and gas to its ethically concerned member owner/customers and is an established large operator, an alternative to the Big Six energy suppliers. Constituting half or more of the Your Co-op Utilities division of its parent society Midcounties Co-operative, Co-op Energy is the only co-operative supplier in the British market, meaning supplied customers can voluntarily acquire an ownership share and thereby receive rights to influence the governance of the business, stand for election and have a say in formulating the products it offers.

Since August 2019, energy supply, billing and customer service of Co-op Energy have been operated by Octopus Energy.

== History ==
Co-op Energy launched in 2010 as an alternative to the Big Six energy suppliers. The company has three sites: one office in Warwick and two in Walsall.

In 2014, User Chooser was launched by Co-op Energy to allow customers to choose where their electricity is sourced from. This service won the EU Sustainable Energy Europe Award in 2015.

A problematic upgrade to its online customer service and billing system in 2015 resulted in numerous problems and a large backlog in dealing with issues. By the end of 2015 it was the most complained about utility company, measured in complaints per thousand customers. By the end of 2016 these issues had been resolved and the company was paying out £1.8 million in compensation to customers.

In 2020, Co-operative Energy Limited came under scrutiny by industry regulator Ofgem after it failed to make payments under the Renewables Obligation scheme. The investigation was closed after Ofgem was given assurances that the late payment deadline would be met.

=== Acquisitions ===
In November 2016, Co-op Energy announced that it would take on all 160,000 customers of collapsed firm GB Energy on their existing price tariff. Ofgem said it had chosen Co-op Energy after "a competitive process to get the best deal possible". All GB Energy's staff were to be transferred on the same terms to Co-op Energy.

In May 2018, Co-op Energy announced that it had acquired Flow Energy, which had approximately 130,000 customers at the time. Co-op Energy said that Flow Energy would remain a separate brand within Co-op Energy and keep its own tariffs. By 2024 the brand ownership of the acquired company was part of the portfolio of assets owned by Octopus Energy's Customer Supply arm.

=== Sale to Octopus Energy ===
In August 2019, following increasing losses, Octopus Energy paid a reported £30 million to acquire the Co-op Energy brand. Customer accounts would be operated by Octopus, while Midcounties retained responsibility for acquiring new customers.

== Membership ==
Members of Co-op Energy receive a share of the company's profits, and can elect the board of directors and attend the annual general meeting and regional meetings.

== See also ==
- British co-operative movement
