= Pure Planet =

British green energy supply company

Pure Planet Limited
- Trade name: Pure Planet
- Formerly: Tulip Energy Supply Limited
- Company type: Privately held company
- Industry: UK Gas and Electricity Supply
- Founded: August 17, 2015; 10 years ago in Chorley, Lancashire
- Founder: Mathew Hirst
- Defunct: 13 October 2021
- Area served: United Kingdom
- Revenue: £157 million (2020)
- Operating income: £13 million (2020)
- Members: 121,817 (2020)
- Number of employees: 79
- Parent: Blue Marble Holdings Limited
- Website: www.purepla.net

Pure Planet was a British energy supply company 24% owned by BP. The company, which was founded in 2015 and based in Bath, England, supplied electricity and gas to domestic customers in the UK. It ceased trading on 13 October 2021 following BP's withdrawal of support. On 17 October, Ofgem appointed Shell Energy (a subsidiary of Royal Dutch Shell) as the new supplier of Pure Planet's customers.

== History ==
In 2015, Tulip Energy Supply Limited was founded by Matthew Hirst.

In March 2017, the company was renamed Pure Planet Limited, and took out a loan for £10 million with a BP subsidiary at an APR of 12%.

In 2017, Tom Alexander, Steven Day and Andrew Ralston announced the founding of a new energy company dubbed "Project Blue Marble", with a planned launch later that year. The project had been underway for more than a year, having secured investment from BP along with the necessary energy licenses to operate in the UK. The team, joined by Chris Alliott, planned to supply energy at a cheaper price than other green energy suppliers by "modernising" their approach, operating on an app-based model, making use of modern technology, and avoiding paper bills. Customers could manage their account via the Pure Planet app and website.

In 2018, The Times reported that Pure Planet had gained its authority to supply from a so-called energy licence factory: "These firms sell companies with licences to entrepreneurs, who can start energy suppliers without detailed checks being carried out on their background."

By May 2019, Pure Planet had grown to 100,000 customers.

Pure Planet was one of a number of green energy companies criticised by Which? in 2019 over their claims to sell "100 per cent renewable" energy. Which? noted that the companies were purchasing Renewable Energy Guarantee of Origin certificates, rather than purchasing renewable energy directly. Steven Day responded by saying that the report had demonstrated a "fundamental misunderstanding of the way electricity is generated, certified, traded, managed by the grid and supplied".

In February 2020, Pure Planet finished second in The Sunday Times' "top 100 small companies" list, making it the top-ranked energy supplier. Judges for the competition cited the organisation's carbon offsetting practices, benefits, mental health support, and commuting offers, as reasons for the ranking.

In November 2020, Pure Planet published a "People and Power" report backed by Opinium Research, revealing that the older generation are more sustainable than the younger generation.

In January 2021, Pure Planet was listed by Which? as second behind fast-growing Octopus Energy as a recommended provider of the year. In the raw tables Pure Planet was listed as 5th.

In May 2021, Pure Planet received the Best Company to Work For Gold Award for (SME) at the UK Employee Experience Awards. The company was also named 6th Best Company To Work For in the South West and won 3rd place in the Mid-Sized Company to Work For, at the ceremony on 21 May. The award for Best Utility Company to Work For was also given to Pure Planet at the event.

== Collapse ==
The company ceased trading on 13 October 2021, following BP's decision to withdraw support owing to the risk of large potential losses at the already loss making company.

The company said it had been caught between rising costs and the UK's energy price cap, which limited what companies could charge consumers.
