= Robin Hood Energy =

Not-for-profit energy company (2015–2020)

- Formation: September 2015; 11 years ago
- Founder: Nottingham City Council
- Dissolved: September 2020
- Type: Not-for-profit energy company
- Purpose: To provide low cost energy to households
- Headquarters: Loxley House, Station Street, Nottingham, NG2 3NG
- Location: Nottingham
- Parent organization: Nottingham City Council

Robin Hood Energy was a not-for-profit energy company launched in September 2015 by Nottingham City Council as a competitor to the "big six" energy suppliers in the United Kingdom. The company supplied gas and electricity nationally to homes and businesses until September 2020, when its customer accounts were sold to Centrica, the parent company of British Gas.

== Structure and operations ==
The company was wholly owned by Nottingham City Council. Its role was to provide low-cost energy to households and address fuel poverty. It offered special tariffs to residents within the boundaries of Nottingham City Council and provided a socially-orientated pricing structure to the whole of the UK.

The company operated on a not-for-profit basis by keeping overheads as low as possible, and did not pay bonuses to directors. Any profits made are reinvested. The chair of the company's board was a Nottingham councillor.

As a publicly owned energy company, the business aimed to "champion the average person on the street, and make decisions that are morally and ethically right rather than trying to please shareholders". The company specialised in prepayment meters, as customers with these meters generally can least afford energy, are in fuel poverty or are some of the most vulnerable customers, but are proportionally charged more for it. The company had worked to minimise price increases for those customers even though costs were increasing.

== History ==
When Robin Hood Energy was launched in 2015 it was the UK's first publicly owned not-for-profit energy company. None had existed since the UK energy system was nationalised in 1948 under the Electricity Act 1947 and subsequently privatised in 1990 under the Electricity Act 1989.

A number of employees were transferred from Nottingham City Council to Robin Hood Energy in February 2017. The council retained liability for 80% of those employees' pension costs.

In the year to 31 March 2018, the company had 99 employees and made a small operating profit for the first time: the after-tax amount was £202,000 on turnover of £70.4 million.

In July 2018, the company announced that its electricity supplied to UK homes and businesses would be 100% renewable and it would also voluntarily enter into the Warm Home Discount scheme, which offers the elderly a payment of £140 over the winter period to help with fuel bills. This is only mandatory for energy companies with more than 250,000 customers; Robin Hood Energy has a customer base half the size of this, but voluntarily began to offer the Warm Home Discount from 2018.

In January 2019, the business was rated as second best in the UK for customer service as part of the annual Which? survey. As of January 2019, Robin Hood Energy had 130,000 customers.

In September 2019, Robin Hood Energy failed to pass on £9.5 million in renewables obligation (RO) payments to Ofgem, the industry regulator, which it had already collected from its customers. The Ofgem director implied that failure to settle this debt could mean losing its licence. Payment was made to Ofgem the next month, after the company obtained a £9.5 million interest-bearing loan from Nottingham City Council. The next year, at the end of October 2020, Robin Hood Energy missed the late payment deadlines for £12 million of RO payments and £34,000 of feed-in tariff payments. Consequently, on 28 October Ofgem issued a Final Order requiring the company to make those payments, plus accrued interest on the RO debt.

== Closure ==
In September 2020, Nottingham City Council announced that the company would close, and customer accounts (residential and business, including "white label" brands) would be taken over by British Gas. The sale price would depend on how many customers switched to British Gas, but it was expected that the council would make a significant loss, leading to reports the same month that its debts were at risk of becoming unsustainable.

It was revealed through leaked documents that the failure of Robin Hood Energy cost Nottingham taxpayers a total of £38 million.

== Partnerships ==
=== White-label contracts ===
A large part of the business's growth was through public sector endorsement rather than price comparison sites. The Robin Hood Energy model was adopted in other areas of the UK through local authority and council partnerships. The business worked with like-minded councils, with a range of political control and geographical locations, who had an agenda to tackle fuel poverty and address unfairness within the energy market.

Robin Hood Energy was the licensed supplier to several other councils and private businesses:

- Angelic Energy (Islington Council)
- Beam Energy (Barking and Dagenham Council)
- CitizEN Energy (Southampton City Council and neighbouring councils)
- Ebico (not-for-profit company)
- Fosse Energy (Leicestershire County Council and Leicester City Council)
- Great North Energy (Doncaster Council and Barnsley Council)
- The Leccy (Liverpool City Council)
- RAM Energy (Derby City Council)
- Southend Energy (Southend-on-Sea City Council)
- White Rose Energy (Leeds City Council)
- Your Energy Sussex (West Sussex County Council and local authorities)

=== White Rose Energy ===
Robin Hood Energy partnered with Leeds City Council to establish as of September 2016 White Rose Energy, an initiative to provide affordable energy to residents in Leeds and Yorkshire.

=== Ebico ===
Robin Hood Energy was announced on 10 March 2017 as the new supply partner for not-for-profit energy provider and registered social enterprise Ebico. This began a transition of Ebico customers who opted-in to be transferred to new Ebico Zero Tariffs provided by Robin Hood Energy. In the decision to opt for a relationship with Robin Hood Energy, Ebico stated "we wanted to ensure our supply partner shared the same values as us; something Robin Hood Energy does in its mission to provide its customers with low-cost energy".

The decision by Ebico to end its partnership with its former supply partner SSE plc was due to SSE deciding to close Ebico's EquiGas/EquiPower tariffs to new sales. The partnership was welcomed by a number of prominent politicians including Jesse Norman MP, Minister for Energy and Industry; Alan Whitehead MP, Shadow Minister for Energy and Climate Change; and Callum McCaig MP, SNP Spokesperson on Energy.
