= Bulb Energy =

British energy supply company

Bulb Energy Ltd
- Trade name: Bulb
- Formerly: Regent Power Ltd (2013–2015); Hanbury Energy Ltd (June–August 2015)
- Company type: Subsidiary
- Industry: Energy supply
- Founded: 2 April 2013; 13 years ago
- Founders: Amit Gudka; Hayden Wood
- Headquarters: London, United Kingdom
- Revenue: ▲£1.52B (2020)
- Net income: ▲ -£63M (2020)
- Members: 1,700,000 (Nov 2021)
- Number of employees: 1,000 (2020)
- Parent: Simple Energy (?–2022); Octopus Energy (2022–present)
- Website: bulb.co.uk (Archived 2023-08-31 at the Wayback Machine); bulb.com (Archived 2023-06-13 at the Wayback Machine)

Bulb Energy Ltd, trading as Bulb, was an energy supply company in the United Kingdom acquired by Octopus Energy in 2022. Founded in 2013, the company attracted venture capital from DST Global and Magnetar Capital and ran at a financial loss while achieving rapid growth in customers. Bulb claimed to provide electricity and gas from renewable or off-set sources. As of November 2021, it had a share of approximately 5-6% of the UK energy market and was considered the seventh largest in the country.

In September 2021, the company sought a bailout due to financial problems caused by increasing natural gas prices. Instead, it was placed into the Energy Supply Company Administration (a special administration regime) by industry regulator Ofgem on 24 November 2021 following a refusal by investors to provide further funding. While customers of other failed suppliers have been transferred by Ofgem to new suppliers, the regulator decided Bulb was too large, so it became the first energy company in the UK to enter special administration.

In October 2022, Octopus Energy announced they planned to acquire Bulb's 1.5 million customers and 650 staff. The acquisition was completed on 21 December 2022.

== History ==
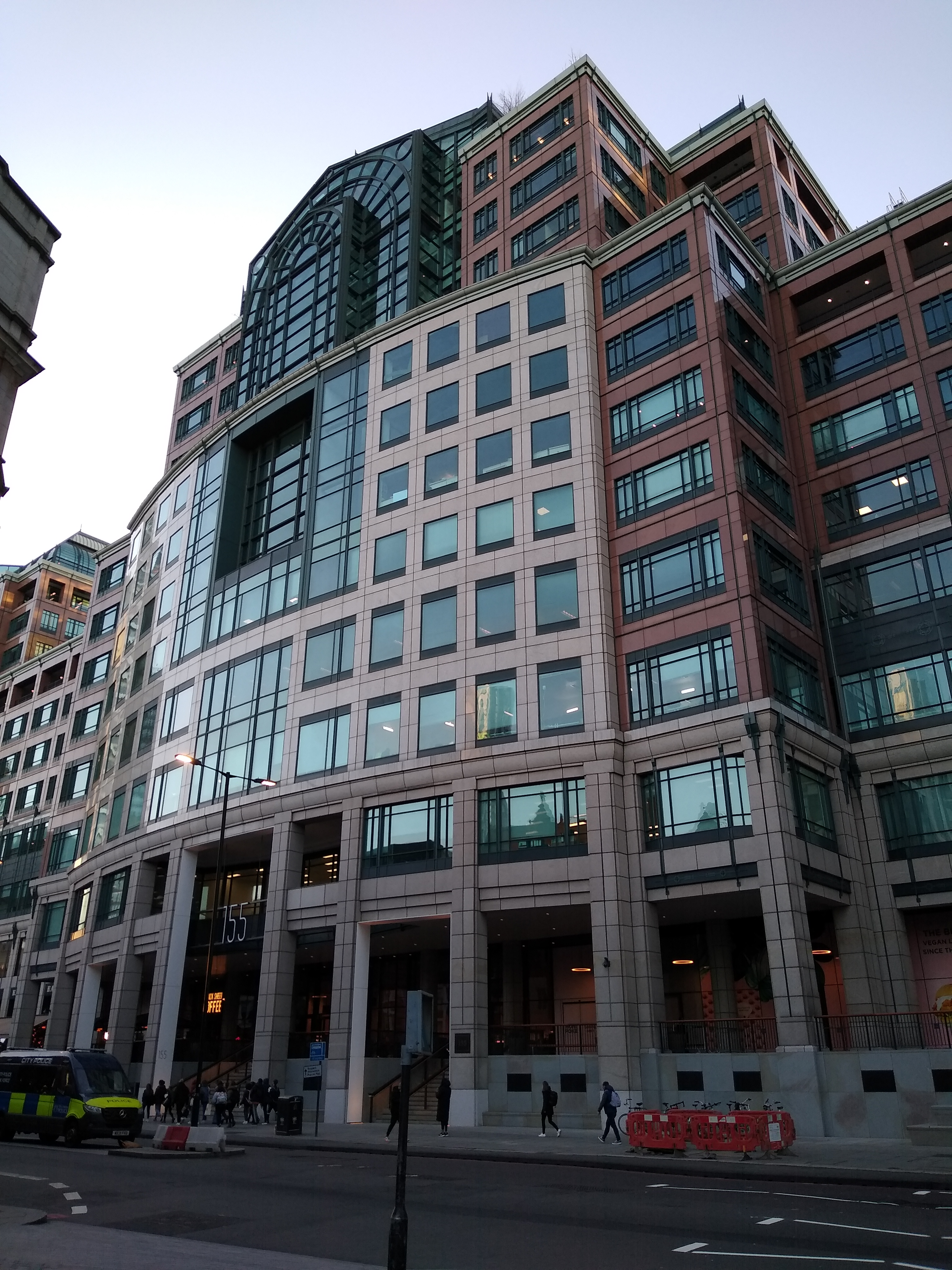
155 Bishopsgate, London, headquarters of Bulb Energy

Bulb Energy Ltd. was incorporated in April 2013 under Regent Power Ltd. and was known as Hanbury Energy Ltd. between June and October 2015. Its parent company is Simple Energy. From the start of trading, the directors were Amit Gudka, a former energy market trader for Barclays, and Hayden Wood, a former management consultant. Gudka stepped down from day-to-day activities at Bulb in February 2021 to focus on his new battery storage startup.

Initial funding came from the founders' savings and from their personal contacts. The backing was then obtained from JamJar Investments. In August 2018 a further £60 million funding was secured from two backers: DST Global (owned by Russian billionaire Yuri Milner), and US hedge fund Magnetar Capital. By 2018, the company was worth between £400M and £500M.

Growth was rapid from the start of 2017, and by early March 2019, the company had over 1 million customers and was employing over 550 staff. Its headquarters moved in February 2019 from offices at Hanbury Street, Shoreditch to Bishopsgate in the City of London.

In 2018, Bulb was the UK's largest renewable energy supplier, and the UK's seventh-largest energy supplier, smaller only than the "Big Six". It was the only company to achieve this growth without taking over other companies, as rival companies had done. SyndicateRoom identified Bulb as the UK's fastest-growing private company of 2018.

=== Special administration and acquisition ===
In September 2021, Bulb sought a bailout due to financial problems caused by sharply increasing natural gas prices. In November 2021, Bulb became the first energy company to go into Special Administration, under which it would be run by the government through the regulator Ofgem. This process allowed the government the option to make grants and loans to the business while the administrators worked to transfer customers and sell the business in parts or as a whole.

The government set aside £1.7 billion to cover the company's trading costs and the cost of the administration. According to the Financial Times, at least two energy suppliers offered solutions that would have allowed Bulb customers to be switched to alternative providers at a reduced cost to consumers and taxpayers.

The company's subsidiaries in France, Spain, and Texas were unaffected by its entry into administration. Teneo were appointed administrators of Bulb in the UK on 24 November, and Interpath were appointed for Bulb's parent Simple Energy.

=== Outcome ===
In October 2022, Octopus Energy agreed to acquire Bulb's 1.5 million customers and 650 employees. The acquisition was completed on 21 December 2022.

In November, the Office for Budget Responsibility estimated the potential liability to be underwritten by the government was £6.5 billion, although the government stated that volatility in energy markets made forecasts difficult.

It was reported that costs of £1.5bn were incurred during the administration process. The government provided post-completion funding to enable Octopus to procure energy for ex-Bulb customers for the winter of 2022; in the event, Octopus drew down £1.6bn of this. By the summer of 2024, Octopus was expected to repay the government £2.8bn, comprising the £1.6bn plus £1.2bn profit from falling energy costs. As a result, it was estimated that the total cost to the government of Bulb's failure was £6.1 million.

== Operations ==
In the year 2018–2019, Bulb's renewable electricity was generated as follows: 73% from wind power, 24% from solar power, and 3% from hydroelectricity. Bulb's carbon-neutral gas was composed of 10% biogas and 90% carbon offset.

Bulb announced in June 2019 that they were expanding to France, Spain, and Texas.

In August 2020, Bulb agreed to pay £1.76 million in redress, refunds, and goodwill payments after industry regulator Ofgem found 11,400 customers had been overcharged, together with other mistakes (some self-reported by Bulb).

Bulb customer numbers
Date	Customers (approx.)	Source
January 2017	15,000	
August 2017	100,000	
January 2018	200,000; 300,000	
August 2018	670,000	
January 2019	870,000	
March 2019	1,130,000	
November 2021	1,700,000	
