= Solarplicity =

Energy supply company in the United Kingdom

- Formerly: LoCO2
- Company type: Private
- Industry: Electricity and gas supply
- Founded: 2009 (as LoCO2)
- Headquarters: Ware, Hertfordshire
- Area served: United Kingdom
- Key people: David Elbourne (CEO)
- Website: www.solarplicity.com

Solarplicity Energy Limited was a renewable energy company based in Hertfordshire, England. In August 2019 the company became the 13th energy supplier to collapse since 2018, affecting around 7,500 domestic and 500 business customers.

== History ==
LoCO2 Energy was established in 2009 as the retail arm of a vertically integrated group of energy companies known as TradeLink Solutions.

Solarplicity began in 2012 as a provider of solar panel systems. It acquired and rebranded LoCO2 Energy in spring 2017.

An initiative to install solar panels on Stoke-on-Trent council homes, marketed as Community Energy Scheme, commenced in 2018.

== Energy tariffs ==
Solarplicity offered several green energy plans to domestic accounts including fixed, variable and smart meter tariffs. Businesses were offered a gas and renewable electricity tariff with no standing charge.

== Fuel mix ==
Solarplicity's overall fuel mix for 2017/2018 saw 100% of electricity generated from renewables.

== Customer service ==
Solarplicity was ranked lowest for customer service of 30 energy suppliers in a 2019 survey published by consumer group Which?, citing issues with its online and phone customer service, and poor handling of complaints.

Citizens Advice quarterly assessment of energy suppliers has consistently rated Solarplicity poorly. For the period January–March 2019 it was placed 32nd out of 39 suppliers with an overall score of 2.3/5, a slight improvement on the previous quarter.

Review website Trustpilot lists the company as "poor". Recurring comments involve billing issues and overdue refunds.

The Energy Ombudsman stated there were 3,324 complaints against Solarplicity in 2019, including 583 in July.

== Regulator action ==
Industry regulator Ofgem can issue enforcement action against energy companies it believes may breach its licence conditions. A provisional order signals an investigation of an apparent breach. A final order can be issued when Ofgem is satisfied a breach has occurred. An operator may face fines or have its licence to operate revoked.

=== First Provisional Order ===
The Energy Ombudsman investigated over 1,000 complaints against the supplier in 2018. Highlighting customer service and account switching issues, on 22 February 2019 Ofgem issued a provisional order banning Solarplicity from taking on new customers for three months and also prohibiting increases of vulnerable customers' direct debit payments. Citizens Advice supported this move.

Channel 4 programme Supershoppers broadcast in May claimed Solarplicity staff were "very sneaky", repeatedly stating they were unable accept new customers because the company was "changing tariffs", not due to a banning order. In only one of five calls made by Supershoppers did staff admit they were "taking time to rectify issues with current customers." In a statement for the show, the energy supplier claimed it had "made significant improvements to its customer service performance."

Three months after issuing the provisional order, Ofgem determined Solarplicity had taken sufficient steps to address its concerns and allowed the order to lapse. Amongst agreed undertakings, the company would not acquire new domestic customers until 5 August 2019, except for a limited number under its community energy scheme.

Utility Week, an industry journal, revealed that despite Ofgem's relaxation, complaints to the Energy Ombudsman had actually surged, with over 2,000 complaints during January–May 2019 and 478 in April alone. The ombudsman indicated there were problems with timely remediation including goodwill payments and refunds. Solarplicity suggested customers were bypassing its complaints process and contacting the ombudsman first. The company repeated claims of service improvements.

=== Second Provisional Order ===
In May 2019, Ofgem demanded Solarplicity settle outstanding feed-in tariff (FIT) payments due to several energy generators and meet ongoing obligations. The company had failed to pay some generators on time despite receiving FIT levelisation payments itself.

Solarplicity missed further payments in June. Following fresh complaints Ofgem was satisfied that the company had breached its rules and confirmed the order in August. The order lapsed when Solarplicity Supply ceased trading and its licence was revoked.

== Partial sale to Toto Energy and collapse of Solarplicity Supply ==
In late July 2019, 43,000 of Solarplicity's 60,000 domestic accounts were acquired by Toto Energy. Transfer of affected customers occurred early August. The agreement included Toto supplying all Community Energy Scheme customers. Solarplicity continued to serve business customers and the remaining domestic accounts. Shortly after the Toto deal, Solarplicity Supply ceased trading.

Solarplicity denied speculation in The Guardian that it sold off its "valuable" accounts to Toto, leaving Ofgem to cover debts. The newspaper believed Solarplicity owed over £3.5m in outstanding credit balances when it ceased trading. The week prior to the collapse, some customers, including those transferred to Toto Energy, reported erroneous direct debit payments taken from their accounts. Ofgem appointed EDF Energy as the supplier of last resort (SoLR) for impacted residential customers, ensuring there was no disruption to energy supply.

Customers transferred to Toto Energy faced further disruption when it failed in October, just three months after the Solarplicity transaction.

== Financial reporting and administrations ==
Administrators were appointed to Solarplicity Supply and Solarplicity Energy on 19 August 2019, shortly before Companies Court winding up hearings petitioned by HM Revenue & Customs and smart meter infrastructure company Smart DCC. Accounts to 31 March 2018 for both companies were seven months overdue.

Ofgem stated Solarplicity Supply owed National Grid Gas over £140,000 and Smart DCC over £280,000.

For the year ended 31 March 2017, Solarplicity Energy Limited's profit was £26,177 on a turnover of £13.1m; this compares to a profit for the previous year of £81,582 on a turnover of £12.1m.

In July 2019, four other companies were placed in administration. Winding-up petitions against several Solarplicity businesses had also been instigated by HM Revenue & Customs. At the time Solarplicity stated the petitions were settled, dismissed by or adjourned.

In 2018, Solarplicity Ltd, the energy generation arm, was put into liquidation on 14 May following a winding up petition from HM Revenue & Customs. Documents filed at Companies House indicate a total of £3.96 million in outstanding and overdue taxes owed by this entity.

=== Peerglow Group ===
Solarplicity Group which formerly owned Solarplicity Energy Limited was renamed Peerglow Group in 2019 and performs head office activities. Its late-filed 2018 accounts showed negative capital and reserves of almost £4 million. Apollo Investment Corp. considers its equity stake in this group "worthless".
