= Our Power =

Former United Kingdom energy company

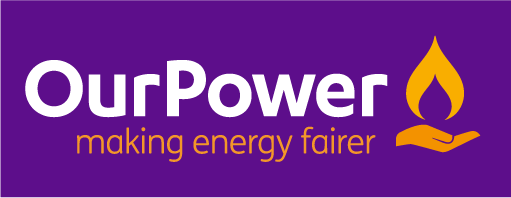
- Company type: Limited company
- Industry: Utilities
- Founded: 2016
- Defunct: January 25, 2019
- Headquarters: Edinburgh, Scotland
- Area served: United Kingdom
- Key people: Dawn Muspratt (Co-Founder and CEO)
- Products: Gas; Electricity renewable energy supply
- Website: our-power.co.uk

Our Power was an energy supply company backed by the Scottish government, one of the first in the UK to operate on a non-profit distribution basis. Our Power was entirely asset-locked, being owned by social housing providers, community organisations and local authorities.

The company failed to make a profit and ceased to trade on 25 January 2019. Subsequently, industry regulator Ofgem arranged for Utilita Energy to take over its 31,000 customers.

== History ==
Established in 2016 with 53 housing associations and local authorities as members, the company broadened its investor-base in late 2017 after raising £4.4 million from 301 investors via a social purpose bond. By the time it ceased trading, the company had received funds of £16.6m (including £9.8m from the Scottish government) via Our Power Community Benefit Society Limited.

At first the company relied on the member organisations switching the supply at their vacant properties to Our Power, in the hope that the incoming tenants would remain with the company. The company began to supply the wider market in Scotland in October 2017 and expanded to England and Wales in early 2018. In early 2019, around 80% of customers were in Scotland.

Trading losses were £1.9m in 2016 and almost £5m in 2017. In 2018 the directors of the community benefit society considered that further funding in the region of £7m was required.

== Operations ==
=== Personnel and members ===
Our Power was based in Edinburgh and had 68 employees when it entered administration. By 2018 it worked with 67 social housing providers, community organisations and local authorities.

=== Expansion and diversification ===
The company partnered with the charity Money Advice Scotland in late 2017 to launch a variable tariff for customers on restricted meters, who are unable to switch providers or access tariffs available to single-rate meter customers. With the aim of turning a profit by 2020, its fourth year of operation, Our Power extended their membership to include a Welsh housing association.

=== +IMPACT tariff ===
In February 2018, Our Power introduced its first UK-wide tariff called +IMPACT, which the company defined as "100% green". It aimed to be competitively priced, with the ultimate goal being to "secure thousands of ethically-minded energy customers" by the end of the year. Our Power developed the tariff to bring energy costs down for families living in or at risk of fuel poverty.

=== Renewable energy investment ===
In 2018, Our Power partnered with Mongoose Energy for the purpose of creating 'Our Community Energy', a renewable energy investment scheme, which directly linked renewable generation and not-for-profit ownership. The community organisation was launched in response to a survey which had found that more than a third of Scots (36%) admitted to living in fuel poverty, suggesting that this was particularly acute in the case of millennials, with over half of those aged 18–34 (56%) directly impacted. The scheme intended to take supplies from two Scottish community-owned wind-power projects, so that the companies could offer less expensive electricity to those most in need of cheaper energy. The wind farms in Pogbie, East Lothian, and Brockholes, Berwickshire aspired to raise £2.9 million through bond and equity offers.

== Failure ==
Our Power Energy Supply Limited entered administration on 31 January 2019 with net debt of £29.9 million, including £4.9m owed to its parent community benefit society, and £3.3m owed to Utilita. The community benefit society also entered administration.
