= People's Energy =

The People’s Energy Company Limited
- Company type: Energy supplier
- Industry: Utilities
- Founded: 2017
- Founders: David Pike, Karin Sode
- Defunct: 14 September 2021; 4 years ago
- Headquarters: Shawfair, Scotland
- Area served: United Kingdom
- Website: www.peoplesenergy.co.uk

People's Energy was an energy supplier based in Shawfair, Scotland, which operated from 2017 until 2021.

== History ==
Co-founders David Pike and Karin Sode launched a crowdfunding campaign in 2017 to launch the company with the promise of returning 75% of profits back to customers. On 31 July 2017, the company successfully raised £487,815 from 2,059 supporters in 199 days. The company received their Ofgem licence and launched in August 2017.

People's Energy Community Interest Company is the parent company of The People's Energy Company Limited, which owns People's Energy (Supply) Limited.

On 14 September 2021, it was announced that the company would cease trading with immediate effect, as a result of rising wholesale gas costs. Its customers were subsequently transferred to British Gas.

== Customer numbers ==
People's Energy supplied around 350,000 customers.

== Energy mix ==
People's Energy offered 100% renewable electricity.
