= Shell Energy =

Consumer broadband, gas and electricity supplier in the UK

Shell Energy Retail Limited
- Industry: Utilities
- Predecessor: First Utility
- Founded: 2008
- Headquarters: Coventry, United Kingdom
- Area served: United Kingdom
- Key people: Tony Keeling, Chief Executive Officer
- Products: Gas & electricity
- Parent: Octopus Energy
- Website: www.shellenergy.co.uk

Shell Energy Retail Limited was a British consumer gas, electricity and broadband provider. Formerly a subsidiary of Shell, the business was acquired by Octopus Energy in December 2023.

The company purchased gas and electricity from international markets for resale to consumers. Originally known as First Utility, the company had a relationship with Shell, where it acted as an intermediary to purchase wholesale energy on the global market. Shell completed the purchase of the company in February 2018, and rebranding to Shell Energy in the UK took place in March 2019. The business formed part of Shell's New Energies division until the 2023 sale to Octopus Energy.

== History ==
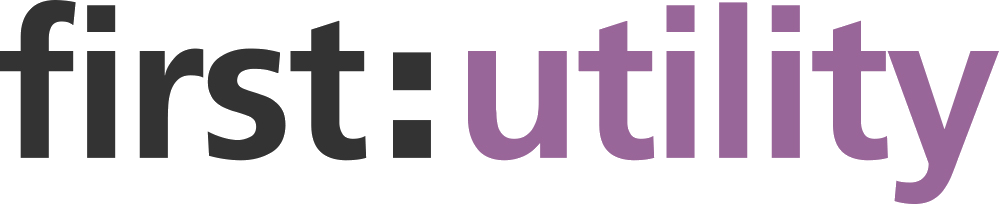
First Utility logo, 2015

First Utility was launched in 2008 by co-founders Mark Daeche, Darren Braham and Marcus Citron as a spin-out from First Telecom. In January 2012, the company appointed the former lastminute.com CEO Ian McCaig as its new CEO.

As a small new entrant to the market, the company experimented with new technology. The company was the first in the UK to offer smart meters to its residential customers. This also gave the company experience of a large smart meter roll-out programme. The company partnered with various other providers including oPower and Google PowerMeter to provide customers with access to usage data.

Ofgem issued a disciplinary order against the company in December 2010 for failing to protect vulnerable customers.

In 2014, the company received criticism for the tone of its energy saving advice. When it was reported that shadow Energy Minister Tom Greatrex had said the advice was an "insult" to millions of people, the company's reported response was that "These tips are meant to provide some advice on how we might reduce our energy usage and absolutely not intended to trivialise the issue of fuel poverty, something we take very seriously."

In January 2014, the company signed a three-year deal to become title sponsors of the Super League.

In September 2014, the firm announced it was considering an initial public offering or outside investment to fund foreign expansion.

In September 2015, the company announced an expansion into Germany, to be branded as Shell. In the same month, Reuters reported that First Utility had doubled customer numbers in three of the last four years, adding 275,000 customers in the year to July 2015.

Shell reached an agreement to buy the company in December 2017, and the deal was completed on 28 February 2018. In March 2019, the company was rebranded from First Utility to Shell Energy, and it was stated that all customers would be supplied with electricity from 100% renewable sources.

First Utility had also offered an Internet access service, bundled with line rental and phone calls, and this was continued under the Shell Energy brand.

=== Acquisitions ===
In October 2019, Shell Energy agreed to the £10.5m purchase of the customers of Green Star Energy, a brand of Canada's Just Energy. Green Star had around 200,000 residential gas and electricity customers.

In February 2021, Shell Energy took over the broadband and phone customers of Post Office Ltd.

In September 2021, Ofgem chose Shell Energy to take on the 255,000 customers of failed supplier Green Supplier Limited. The following month, Ofgem chose Shell Energy to take on the 15,000 Colorado Energy, 235,000 Pure Planet and 9,000 Daligas customers after those suppliers ceased trading.

== Sale to Octopus Energy ==
In September 2023, it was reported that Octopus Energy would acquire Shell's household energy business in the UK and in Germany, in a deal expected to complete in late 2023. Octopus would take over providing energy for 1.4 million homes as well as broadband services for 500,000 customers. In December 2023, it was reported that TalkTalk would acquire the broadband customers.

== Finances ==
In 2020 the company had revenue of £856 million, gross profit of £84 million and a net operating loss of £84 million.
