= Flow Energy =

United Kingdom energy company (2013–2019)

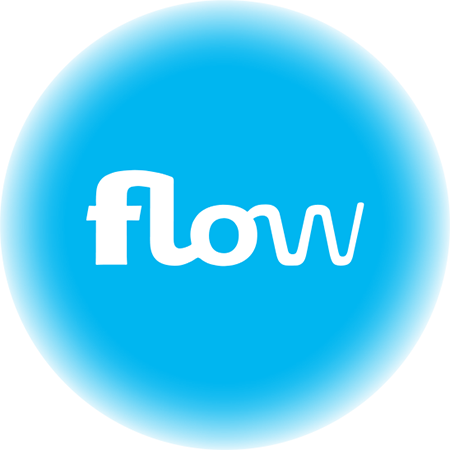
- Type: Subsidiary
- Industry: Energy supply
- Founded: 2013
- Defunct: 2019
- Headquarters: Ipswich, United Kingdom
- Area served: United Kingdom
- Products: Gas; Electricity
- Owner: Co-op Energy

Flow Energy, also known as Flowgroup, was an energy supplier headquartered in Ipswich, Suffolk. The company was launched as a small independent domestic energy supply company in April 2013, offering gas and electricity to homes throughout the UK. Flow Energy was acquired by Co-op Energy in May 2018, and the Flow brand continued to be used until August 2019 when the customers were acquired by Octopus Energy.

== History ==
Until 2018 Flow Energy was part of Flowgroup plc, an energy innovation and services company listed on the AIM exchange of the London Stock Market and founded in 1998.

In April 2014, Flow Energy launched its domestic energy supply service. At the end of 2015 Flow Energy exceeded 100,000 home energy customer accounts.

In April 2018, Flowgroup plc announced its intention to sell Flow Energy to Co-op Energy. Flowgroup had previously sold its boiler technology business to focus on energy supply. The sale was completed in May 2018 and following the completion of the sale of the boiler and the Energy business, Flowgroup de-listed from the UK stock market and subsequently entered administration in November 2018.

On 2 October 2020, Ofgem published its notice of proposal to issue a Final Order (FO) on Flow Energy in accordance with Section 25(1) of the Electricity Act 1989 (EA89).

== Boiler ==
Around 2014, the company developed a household boiler that fed back electricity to the local distribution network. The boiler, which was available to customers from early 2016, provided heating and hot water whilst also generating low-carbon electricity using its patented microCHP (Combined Heat and Power) technology, in which waste heat evaporated a low-boiling-point liquid to run an interlocking twin 2D scroll-shape turbine generator. The Guardian called the financial arrangement "unusual": customers would typically pay £1,200 to have the boiler installed and sign a five-year finance agreement with Zopa for the rest of the cost, but Flow would reimburse the monthly payments on the loan. After five years, provided the customer retained Flow as their energy supplier, Flow would start to pay them half the income received (through the feed-in tariff mechanism) for the electricity generated.

The boiler was manufactured by Jabil Circuit Inc, an OEM manufacturing partner. The boiler was designed in Capenhurst near Chester and manufactured in Livingston, Scotland. In July 2014 the company opened a research, training and development facility in Runcorn, Cheshire, where Gas Safe registered engineers undertook surveying, installation and aftercare training programmes to become accredited installers of the Flow boiler.

By 2017, the boiler had become uneconomic in the British market after sharp reductions in government subsidy via the feed-in-tariff scheme, and increased manufacturing costs. In April 2018, Flow sold the assets related to the microCHP business to iGEN Technologies Inc. of Canada.
