= 2021 United Kingdom natural gas supplier crisis =

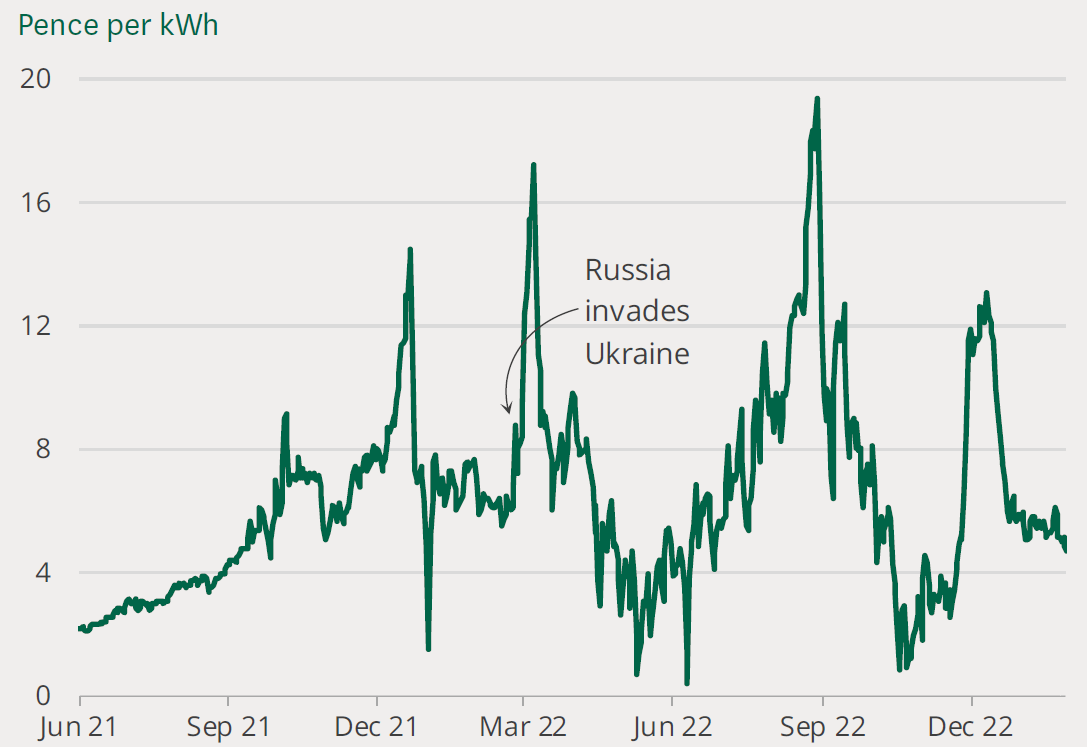
UK wholesale spot price for natural gas June 2021 to January 2023

Starting from August 2021, high European wholesale natural gas prices started severely impacting the United Kingdom. Due to a combination of unfavourable circumstances, including soaring demand of gas in Asia, diminished gas supply from Russia to the European markets, low gas stockpiles, and a series of breakdowns at various electrical facilities, consumers in the United Kingdom faced steep increases in gas prices.

Consumers, utility companies, and businesses dependent on carbon dioxide were all impacted. The crisis caused some smaller domestic suppliers in the United Kingdom to go out of business, affecting almost two million consumers as of 14 October 2021.

== Causes ==
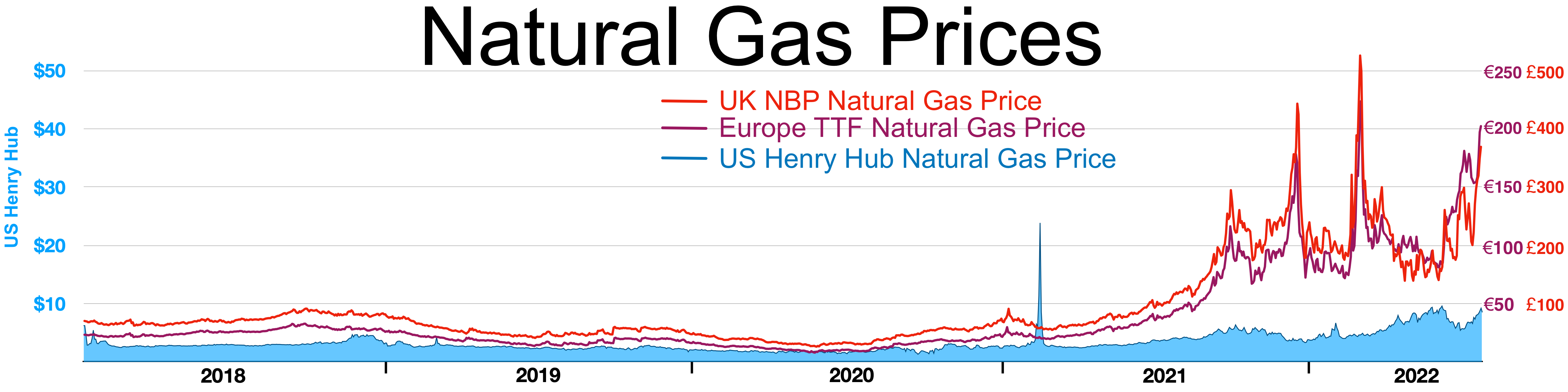
Natural gas prices in Europe and United States National Balancing Point NBP (UK) natural gas prices Europe TTF natural gas prices United States Henry Hub natural gas prices

The primary cause of the price rises has been a surge in the wholesale price of natural gas worldwide. Domestic supply only covers about 40% of the United Kingdom's needs, while the rest is imported from neighbouring countries, such as Norway and the Netherlands, and further afield in Qatar and the United States, and Russia supplies around 5% of the UK market. Gas prices rose by 250% between January and September 2021, with a 70% rise in the month of August alone. The price increase was caused by a global surge in demand as the world quit the economic recession caused by COVID-19, particularly due to strong energy demand in Asia.

Russia usually supplies 40%-50% of the European Union's consumption, while Algeria, Norway and LNG imports cover much of the rest. Immediately prior to the crisis Russia supplied less than usual to Europe - it supplied gas in accordance with long-term contracts, but has not supplied additional gas on the spot market. The Economist Intelligence Unit reports that Russia had limited extra gas export capacity because of high domestic requirements with production near its peak, as well as technical issues. During January–June 2021 Russia had supplied about 22% more gas to Europe than the same months in 2020, and almost the same amount as in 2019. Algeria had also increased supplies in those months, but other countries had supplied less, including Norway, the UK, and the Netherlands.

The weather conditions also came to a disadvantage to Britain: a cold 2020/21 winter in the United Kingdom resulted in more natural gas being used for central heating than usual, depleting stockpiles, which was worsened by an extra gas requirement for electricity generation over summer 2021 because of a series of nuclear power outages, the shutdown following a fire of the HVDC Cross-Channel interconnection bringing electricity from France, as well as the closure of the Rough storage facility, which made it impossible for Britain to maintain long-term reserves. This was compounded in the United Kingdom by one of the least windy summers since 1961, causing wind power generation to be lower than usual.

Many gas companies had sold consumers fixed-rate-tariff contracts for a fixed duration, e.g. a year, but had failed to sufficiently forward hedge against future wholesale gas price rises, so they were facing large losses on these fixed rate contracts. Additionally legal restrictions on the maximum ordinary tariff gas companies are allowed to charge consumers meant that this price rise was unable to be entirely passed on to these customers. The result was that beginning in September 2021, some smaller gas supply companies went out of business due to bankruptcy.

== Effects ==
At the start of 2021 there were about 70 domestic gas supply companies in the UK. As of 22 November 2021, a total of 20 gas supply companies had ceased trading as a direct result of the ongoing crisis, affecting around three and a half million customers. These included Avro Energy and Bulb Energy; the latter was the largest supplier to cease trading to date, affecting around 1.7 million customers, while the demise of Avro Energy affected a further 580,000. Bulb was the UK's seventh-biggest energy company and had roughly 1,000 staff. According to some industry analysts, at least 35 further supply companies were thought to be at risk of collapse. Customers of failed companies were reallocated to new suppliers by the Office of Gas and Electricity Markets mechanism, sometimes switching to more expensive rates. In October 2021, struggling commercial gas consumers requested government intervention. The high gas price significantly impacted electricity prices, and some operators of electric trains temporarily switched to diesel locomotives.

As a consequence of high gas prices, CF Industries ceased production at their fertiliser factories in Teesside and Cheshire. Pure carbon dioxide is a by-product of the Haber process used to make nitrogenous fertilisers, and CF Fertilisers were also one of the largest commercial carbon dioxide producers in the country; as a result, the shutdown led to a shortage of carbon dioxide in other industries, causing food prices to rise. On 21 September, the UK government signed a short-term deal with CF Fertilisers to recommence production. In June 2022, CF Industries permanently shut their fertiliser factory at Ince, Cheshire, due to continuing high gas prices and environmental taxes.

As of 1 December 2021, 28 energy supply companies had failed. Bulb Energy entered energy supply company administration, effectively being supported by the government, and 27 were taken over by new suppliers under the Ofgem transfer regime. In January 2022, Together Energy became the 27th company to go bankrupt. An analyst expected the failings to cost consumers £34, as the losses were to be covered by consumers through the Distribution Use of System.

== Government response ==
Energy Secretary Kwasi Kwarteng said that "There is no question of the lights going out, of people being unable to heat their homes. There will be no three-day working week, or a throwback to the 1970s." Kwarteng also said that "The government will not be bailing out failed companies. There will be no rewards for failure or mismanagement." Prime Minister Boris Johnson said the rise in energy prices was a "short-term" problem caused by "the global economy coming back to life" after the COVID-19 recession.

The UK government approached Qatar to seek a long-term gas deal to ensure a balanced supply of liquefied natural gas (LNG) to the UK. Prime Minister Johnson asked Sheikh Tamim bin Hamad Al Thani, the Emir of Qatar, for help during a meeting at the UN General Assembly in September 2021.

In May 2022 the business secretary, Kwasi Kwarteng, wrote to National Grid's electricity system operator (NGESO) asking them to delay the closure of part of Ratcliffe-on-Soar coal-fired power station in Nottinghamshire. Kwarteng also opened discussions with Centrica about partial reopening of the Rough undersea gas storage facility, which would provide capacity equivalent to several days of the UK's gas consumption.

== Outcome ==
On 28 October 2021, natural gas prices in Europe dropped by 12% after Russia announced it would increase supplies to Austria and Germany after Russian storage sites were filled on about 8 November. Norway increased gas production, and lower coal prices in China also helped move gas prices lower. UK prices closely track European prices, but would remain about four times higher than normal. On 16 November 2021, UK natural gas prices rose by 17% after Germany's energy regulator suspended approval of the Nord Stream 2 natural gas pipeline from Russia to Germany.

High prices in Europe attracted LNG shipping away from other parts of the world. U.S. to Asia cargoes were particularly attracted because of reduced trip time, in addition to pricing. LNG shipments from Russia also increased. The extra supply resulted in some price falls in the last week of December.

== See also ==
- 2021–2023 global energy crisis
- Oil and gas industry in the United Kingdom
- Energy in the United Kingdom
