= United States v. Philadelphia National Bank =

- Supreme Court of the United States

Argued February 20–21, 1963 Decided June 17, 1963
- Full case name: United States v. Philadelphia National Bank and Girard Trust Corn Exchange Bank
- Citations: 374 U.S. 321 (more) 83 S. Ct. 1715; 10 L. Ed. 2d 915
- Argument: Oral argument

Case history
- Prior: 201 F. Supp. 348 (E.D. Pa. 1962)

Court membership
- Chief Justice Earl Warren Associate Justices Hugo Black · William O. Douglas; Tom C. Clark · John M. Harlan II; William J. Brennan Jr. · Potter Stewart; Byron White · Arthur Goldberg

Case opinions
- Majority: Brennan, joined by Warren, Black, Douglas, and Clark
- Concur/dissent: Goldberg
- Dissent: Harlan, joined by Stewart
- White took no part in the consideration or decision of the case.

Laws applied
- 15 U.S.C. § 15

United States v. Philadelphia National Bank, 374 U.S. 321 (1963), also called the Philadelphia Bank case, was a 1963 decision of the United States Supreme Court that held Section 7 of the Clayton Act, as amended in 1950, applied to bank mergers. It was the first case in which the Supreme Court considered the application of antitrust laws to the commercial banking industry. In addition to holding the statute applicable to bank mergers, the Court established a presumption that mergers that covered at least 30 percent of the relevant market were presumptively unlawful.

== Background ==
The defendant, Philadelphia National Bank (PNB), was a commercial bank, a unique type of financial institution because "they alone are permitted by law to accept demand deposits. This distinctive power gives commercial banking a key role in the national economy." In addition, commercial banks engage in the important services of "the creation of additional money and credit, the management of the checking account system, and the furnishing of short-term business loans."

PNB and Girard Trust Corn Exchange Bank, which were respectively the second- and the third-largest of the 42 commercial banks with head offices in the Philadelphia metropolitan area, proposed to merge. PNB had assets of over $1 billion, making it the 21st-largest bank in the nation. Girard had assets of about $750 million. If the two banks merged, the resulting bank would be the largest in the Philadelphia metropolitan area, with 36% of the area banks' total assets (nearly $2 billion), 36% of deposits, and 34% of net loans. It and the second-largest bank (First Pennsylvania Bank and Trust Company, now the largest) would have between them 59% of the total assets, 58% of deposits, and 58% of the net loans. After such a merger, the four-largest banks in the area would have 78% of total assets, 77% of deposits, and 78% of net loans.

Both merging banks owed their present size to previous mergers. A trend toward concentration was noticeable in the Philadelphia area generally: the number of commercial banks declined from 108 in 1947 to 42 in 1960. Since 1950, PNB acquired nine formerly-independent banks and Girard had acquired six. The acquisitions accounted for 59% and 85% of the respective banks' asset growth during the period, 63% and 91% of their deposit growth, and 12% and 37% of their loan growth. During that period, the seven largest banks in the Philadelphia area increased their combined share of the area's total commercial bank resources from about 61% to about 90%.

The Comptroller of Currency approved the merger, despite reports from two other banking agencies and the Attorney General that the proposed merger would have substantial anticompetitive effects in the Philadelphia metropolitan area. The Comptroller explained the basis for his decision to approve the merger:

Since there will remain an adequate number of alternative sources of banking service in Philadelphia, and in view of the beneficial effects of this consolidation upon international and national competition it was concluded that the over-all effect upon competition would not be unfavorable. ... [Also, the consolidated bank] would be far better able to serve the convenience and needs of its community by being of material assistance to its city and state in their efforts to attract new industry and to retain existing industry.

The US Justice Department's Antitrust Division then sued PNB to enjoin the merger, invoking Section 1 of the Sherman Act and Section 7 of the Clayton Act. The district court ruled for PNB and the government appealed to the Supreme Court.

== Supreme Court ruling ==
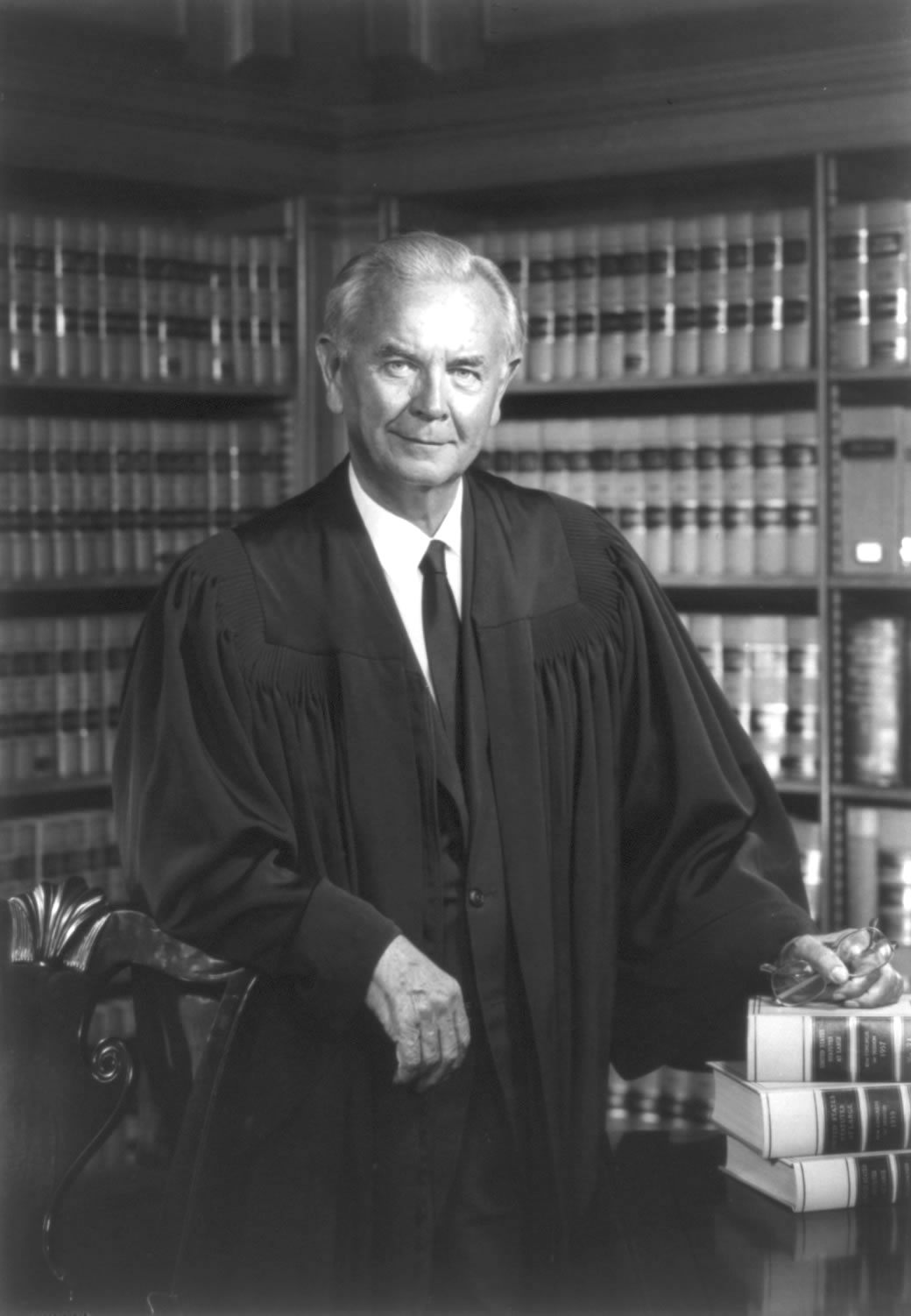
Justice William Brennan

The Supreme Court reversed the judgment below, in an opinion authored by Justice William J. Brennan, joined by four other members of the Court. Justice Arthur Goldberg filed a separate memorandum not dissenting from the judgment but disagreeing with the Court's interpretation of the Clayton Act.

=== Applicability of § 7 to bank mergers ===
The present § 7 reaches acquisitions of corporate stock or share capital by any corporation engaged in commerce, but it reaches acquisitions of corporate assets made only by corporations "subject to the jurisdiction of the Federal Trade Commission." The FTC has no jurisdiction over banks. Therefore, if the proposed merger were considered an assets acquisition, it would not be within § 7. The Court said:

[A] merger fits neither category neatly. Since the literal terms of § 7 thus do not dispose of our question, we must determine whether a congressional design to embrace bank mergers is revealed in the history of the statute. The question appears to be one of first impression; we have been directed to no previous case in which a merger or consolidation was challenged under § 7 of the Clayton Act, as amended, where the acquiring corporation was not subject to the FTC's jurisdiction.

Courts, prior to 1950, held that § 7 did not reach mergers, even though that device had supplanted stock acquisitions for corporate amalgamation. Therefore, Congress in 1950 amended § 7 to include an assets-acquisition provision. The legislative history mentions Congress's intent to cover asset acquisitions but fails to mention mergers. Nonetheless, the Court said, Congress intended to reach substantially all corporate amalgamations:

In other words, Congress contemplated that the 1950 amendment would give § 7 a reach which would bring the entire range of corporate amalgamations, from pure stock acquisitions to pure assets acquisitions, within the scope of § 7. Thus, the stock-acquisition and assets-acquisition provisions, read together, reach mergers, which fit neither category perfectly but lie somewhere between the two ends of the spectrum.

The Court noted that "after the passage of the [1950] amendment, some members of Congress, and for a time the Justice Department, voiced the view that bank mergers were still beyond the reach of the section." But this was just their misunderstanding of the scope of § 7, the Court said. The Court also held that the Bank Merger Act of 1960 was not intended to displace the Clayton Act: "Congress plainly did not intend the 1960 Act to extinguish other sources of federal restraint of bank acquisitions having anticompetitive effects."

=== Application of § 7 ===
==== Relevant market ====
The Court began by defining the relevant market: "the 'line of commerce' (relevant product or services market) and 'section of the country' (relevant geographical market) in which to appraise the probable competitive effects of appellees' proposed merger." It found the cluster of services and financial products termed commercial banking to be the appropriate line of commerce—they "are so distinctive that they are entirely free of effective competition from products or services of other financial institutions."

The district court erred, the Court said, in defining the geographic market as the whole Northeastern US: "The proper question to be asked in this case is not where the parties to the merger do business or even where they compete, but where, within the area of competitive overlap, the effect of the merger on competition will be direct and immediate." Quoting the Tampa Electric case, the Court explained that "area of effective competition in the known line of commerce must be charted by careful selection of the market area in which the seller operates, and to which the purchaser can practicably turn for supplies." The Court said purchasers could practically turn only to banks in the Philadelphia Metropolitan Area, even if PNB and other banks might be able to complete in the larger Northeastern US area.

==== Likely competitive impact ====
Having determined the relevant market, the Court turned to "the ultimate question under § 7: whether the effect of the merger 'may be substantially to lessen competition' in the relevant market." Citing the Standard Stations case, the Court warned that "we must be alert to the danger of subverting congressional intent by permitting a too-broad economic investigation." Therefore, "in any case in which it is possible, without doing violence to the congressional objective embodied in § 7, to simplify the test of illegality, the courts ought to do so in the interest of sound and practical judicial administration."

The Court pointed to the fact pattern of the PNB-Girard merger:

The merger . . . will result in a single bank's controlling at least 30% of the commercial banking business in the four-county Philadelphia metropolitan area. Without attempting to specify the smallest market share which would still be considered to threaten undue concentration, we are clear that 30% presents that threat. Further, whereas presently the two largest banks in the area (First Pennsylvania and PNB) control between them approximately 44% of the area's commercial banking business, the two largest after the merger (PNB-Girard and First Pennsylvania) will control 59%. Plainly, we think, this increase of more than 33% in concentration must be regarded as significant.

The Court justified its inference from market percentages by pointing to language in the legislative history "that the tests of illegality under amended § 7 'are intended to be similar to those which the courts have applied in interpreting the same language as used in other sections of the Clayton Act.'" The Court therefore looked to § 3 of the Clayton Act and the Standard Stations case. In that case, "the defendant company, which accounted for 23% of the sales in the relevant market and, together with six other firms, accounted for 65% of such sales, maintained control over outlets through which approximately 7% of the sales were made." The Court also cited another exclusive dealing case, FTC v. Motion Picture Adv. Serv. Co., in which "the four major firms in the industry had foreclosed 75% of the relevant market; the respondent's market share, evidently, was 20%." The Court compared these market shares to those of the present case, in which "the four largest banks after the merger will foreclose 78% of the relevant market." The market share data from the exclusive-dealing, contract-integration cases was valid support, the Court concluded, for "the inference we draw in the instant case from the figures disclosed by the record."

The Court did not say that the presumption of unlawfulness was conclusive. It next looked to the record to ascertain whether any facts rebutted the presumption that the 30% and 78% market shares created, but "nothing in the record of this case [] rebut[s] the inherently anticompetitive tendency manifested by these percentages.

That some alternatives still existed for dissatisfied customers among the remaining small banks in the area did not rebut the inference:

In every case short of outright monopoly, the disgruntled customer has alternatives; even in tightly oligopolistic markets, there may be small firms operating. A fundamental purpose of amending § 7 was to arrest the trend toward concentration, the tendency to monopoly, before the consumer's alternatives disappeared through merger, and that purpose would be ill-served if the law stayed its hand until 10, or 20, or 30 more Philadelphia banks were absorbed.

The Court also rejected an argument that the district court had accepted—that the merger would stimulate economic development in Philadelphia:

We are clear, however, that a merger the effect of which "may be substantially to lessen competition" is not saved because, on some ultimate reckoning of social or economic debits and credits, it may be deemed beneficial. A value choice of such magnitude is beyond the ordinary limits of judicial competence, and in any event has been made for us already, by Congress when it enacted the amended § 7. Congress determined to preserve our traditionally competitive economy. It therefore proscribed anticompetitive mergers, the benign and the malignant alike, fully aware, we must assume, that some price might have to be paid.

=== Dissent ===
Justice Harlan, joined by Justice Stewart, dissented. Their principal objection was that Congress did not intend § 7 to apply to bank mergers:

For 10 years everyone—the department responsible for antitrust law enforcement, the banking industry, the Congress, and the bar—proceeded on the assumption that the 1950 amendment of the Clayton Act did not affect bank mergers. This assumption provided a major impetus to the enactment of remedial legislation, and Congress, when it finally settled on what it thought was the solution to the problem at hand, emphatically rejected the remedy now brought to life by the Court.

Justice Goldberg wrote separately that he disagreed with the Court majority that Clayton Act § 7 applied to bank mergers, but he did not disagree with "the judgment invalidating the merger." He said, further:

In my opinion there is a substantial Sherman Act issue in this case, but since the Court does not reach it and since my views relative thereto would be superfluous in light of today's disposition of the case, I express no ultimate conclusion concerning it.

== Subsequent developments ==
In the 40 years since the Philadelphia Bank case was decided, its presumption of likelihood of adverse competitive impact and consequent violation of Clayton Act § 7, based on market share and concentration data, has undergone swings in various directions. The swings have mostly been toward an erosion of the presumption and more ready rebuttal of the presumption, as the following decisions illustrate.

=== Baker Hughes case ===
In United States v. Baker Hughes Inc., a 1990 decision of the D.C. Circuit authored by future Justice Clarence Thomas, the court considered a § 7 challenge that the government brought against a proposed acquisition of Houston-based Baker Hughes's French subsidiary Secoma by Finnish Oy Tampella's subsidiary Tamrock. The companies manufactured and sold hardrock hydraulic underground drilling rigs (HHUDRs) in the United States and throughout the world. Tamrock had approximately 41% of the HHUDR US market and Secoma had approximately 17%. In 1988, however, the combined share of the two firms was 78%. The acquisition greatly increased concentration in the already concentrated HHUDR market. The government lost the case in the district court and appealed to the D.C. Circuit.

The appellate court summarized the current state of the applicable law, based on evolution from the Philadelphia Bank case:

The basic outline of a section 7 horizontal acquisition case is familiar. By showing that a transaction will lead to undue concentration in the market for a particular product in a particular geographic area, the government establishes a presumption that the transaction will substantially lessen competition. The burden of producing evidence to rebut this presumption then shifts to the defendant. If the defendant successfully rebuts the presumption, the burden of producing additional evidence of anticompetitive effect shifts to the government, and merges with the ultimate burden of persuasion, which remains with the government at all times.

The government challenged the district court's conclusion that the defendants rebutted the presumption, arguing that as a matter of law a defendant "can rebut a prima facie case only by a clear showing that entry into the market by competitors would be quick and effective."

The appellate court rejected the government's asserted legal standard:

We find no merit in the legal standard propounded by the government. It is devoid of support in the statute, in the case law, and in the government's own Merger Guidelines. Moreover, it is flawed on its merits in three fundamental respects. First, it assumes that ease of entry by competitors is the only consideration relevant to a section 7 defendant's rebuttal. Second, it requires that a defendant who seeks to show ease of entry bear the onerous burden of proving that entry will be "quick and effective." Finally, by stating that the defendant can rebut a prima facie case only by a clear showing, the standard in effect shifts the government's ultimate burden of persuasion to the defendant.

The court said that "a variety of factors can rebut a prima facie case." The fact that the government can establish a prima facie case through evidence on only one factor, market concentration, does not negate the possible breadth of the analysis: "Evidence of market concentration simply provides a convenient starting point for a broader inquiry into future competitiveness." The court pointed to examples such as United States v. General Dynamics Corp., in which the Court held that the presumption raised by a combined market share of 50% in a concentrated market was rebutted by evidence of "weak competitive stature." The court cited other cases in which a "multiplicity of relevant factors" were considered as rebutting the presumption. In the case before it, the HHUDR market involved sales of from 20 to 40 units a year, so that market share statistics were unreliable and misleading. Further, the customers were highly sophisticated and purchased on the basis of competitive bidding. This too undercut the significance of the government's statistics.

The court noted that immediately after Philadelphia Bank "the Supreme Court construed section 7 to prohibit virtually any horizontal merger or acquisition." The court said that later decisions "discarded Philadelphia Bank's insistence that a defendant 'clearly' disprove anticompetitive effect, and instead described the rebuttal burden simply in terms of a 'showing.' " The court said the later Supreme Court decisions changed § 7 jurisprudence: "Without overruling Philadelphia Bank, then, the Supreme Court has at the very least lightened the evidentiary burden on a section 7 defendant."

=== Heinz case ===
In FTC v. H.J. Heinz Co., the D.C. Circuit again revisited the Philadelphia Bank presumption, in the context of whether the FTC showed a sufficient likelihood of success to get a preliminary injunction against a "duopoly" merger while it conducted an administrative proceeding under Clayton Act § 7. In this case the court veered back toward the Philadelphia Bank standard.

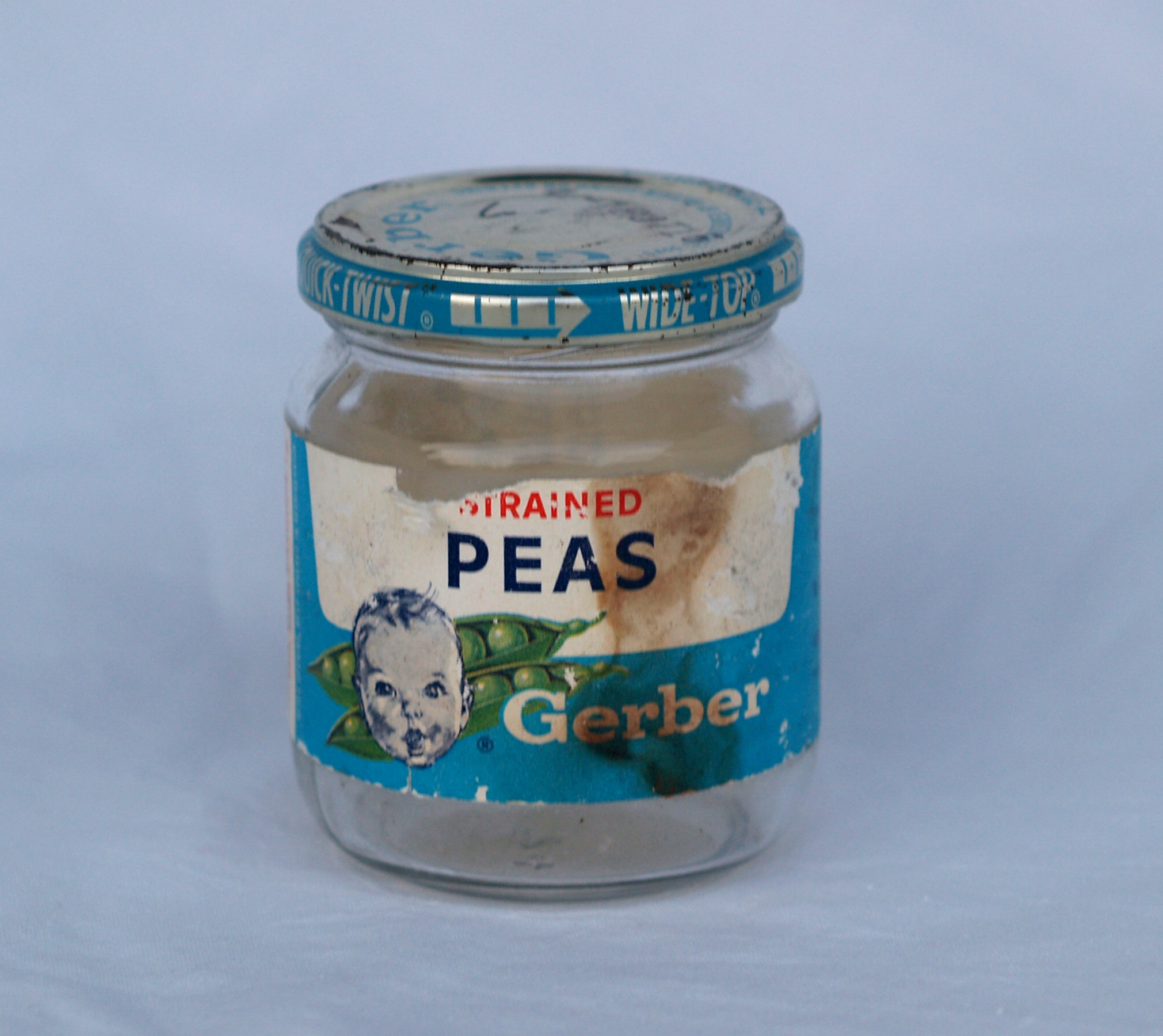
Gerber baby food jar

The Heinz case involved the Heinz baby food organization's proposed acquisition of the Beech-Nut baby food business. That approximately $1 billion annual business is dominated by three brands, Gerber, Heinz, and Beech-Nut. Gerber, the industry leader, enjoys a 65% market share while Heinz and Beech-Nut come in second and third, with 17.4% and a 15.4% share respectively. Gerber enjoys the greatest brand recognition with a brand loyalty greater than any other baby food sold in the United States. Gerber baby food is found in over 90% of all US supermarkets. Heinz, although the largest seller worldwide, is sold in 40% of US supermarkets. Heinz lacks Gerber's brand recognition; it markets its baby food with a shelf price several cents below Gerber's. Third-place Beech-Nut is carried in approximately 45% of US supermarkets. While Gerber sells nationwide, the sales of Heinz and Beech-Nut are confined largely to the East and Midwest. The FTC sought to block the merger by preliminary injunction while it conducted a § 7 Clayton Act proceeding, but the district court refused to grant the preliminary injunction, concluding that it was "more probable than not that consummation of the Heinz/Beech-Nut merger will actually increase competition in jarred baby food in the United States."

The FTC then appealed to the D.C. Circuit, which evaluated the case in terms of the statutory standard for FTC preliminary injunctions—whether a preliminary injunction is in the public interest, considering the FTC's likelihood of success on the merits. The court said that the standard for likelihood of success on the merits is met if the FTC "has raised questions going to the merits so serious, substantial, difficult and doubtful as to make them fair ground for thorough investigation, study, deliberation and determination by the FTC in the first instance and ultimately by the Court of Appeals."

The court began by reviewing the Baker Hughes case, and said that it would use that case's legal standard to determine whether the FTC made a prima facie case and whether Heinz rebutted it. An important factor was market concentration. Here, the jarred baby food market was very concentrated; after the merger it would be a duopoly (a two-firm market). The court said that Heinz had considered three possible options "to end the vigorous wholesale competition with Beech-Nut: two involved innovative measures while the third entailed the acquisition of Beech-Nut." The court added that "Heinz chose the third, and least pro-competitive, of the options," acquisition of Beech-Nut. The fact that high barriers exist to the entry of new competition, the court explained, "largely eliminates the possibility that the reduced competition caused by the merger will be ameliorated by new competition from outsiders and further strengthens the FTC's case. The court noted that "no court has ever approved a merger to duopoly under similar circumstances."

Turning to Heinz's rebuttal, which led the district court to conclude that the merger would not harm competition, the appellate court found that the district court committed legal errors. It wrongly insisted that the FTC show that prices to consumers would rise, which no court has ever held and which is contrary to precedent. The district court also concluded that "the anticompetitive effects of the merger will be offset by efficiencies resulting from the union of the two companies, efficiencies which they assert will be used to compete more effectively against Gerber." This can be a defense, the court said, but "the high market concentration levels present in this case require, in rebuttal, proof of extraordinary efficiencies, which the appellees failed to supply." Moreover, the district court credited speculative and questionable claims about post-merger efficiencies. The district court also found that "without the merger the two firms are unable to launch new products to compete with Gerber because they lack a sufficient shelf presence," and that this defense helped rebut the prima facie case. The appellate court found this kind of defense speculative and not supported by probative evidence. In summary: "Because the district court incorrectly assessed the merits of the appellees' rebuttal arguments, it improperly discounted the FTC's showing of likelihood of success."

The parties abandoned the transaction after the D.C. Circuit's decision, and on remand the district court dismissed the case as moot.

== Commentary ==
Some commentators expressed concern that the FTC's success in the Heinz case amounted to a "root-and-branch repudiation of the 'efficiencies defense.'" Another commentator argued that after the Heinz case, the agencies are pressing courts to require too high a level of proof as to rebuttal evidence.

Another recent commentary, however, asserts that the FTC and Justice Department, as well as courts, give weight to properly-presented efficiency arguments, which may tip the balance in favor of a merger, even if they are not dispositive. The conclusion is drawn that "there are numerous examples where efficiencies tipped the scale in favor of clearing the merger (collecting cases)."

An Antitrust Division official recently insisted that the decision's "presumption remains the best way for courts to implement the concern for increasing concentration that motivated" the 1950 amendment of Section 7. He argued that the presumption simplifies and provides a "more workable structure" for addressing horizontal merger cases, he added:

This remains a sensible way of reflecting Congress's concern with trends toward increased concentration. Where the merged firm would gain an especially large share of the market, and potentially an enhanced ability to control output and price—or market power—courts should be less tolerant of the merger. Moreover, the presumption . . . gives useful guidance to businesses about how section 7 will likely be applied. The presumption—grounded in economics—serves as a useful screen for courts that are not experts at determining the anticompetitive effects of a merger. And the likelihood of any error is reduced by allowing defendants the opportunity to rebut the presumption.

Steven Salop, of Georgetown University, also recently praised Philadelphia Bank and concluded:

All in all, the 1963 formulation of the PNB structural presumption was a forward-looking analytic approach to antitrust jurisprudence. This use of legal and enforcement presumptions based on economic presumptions arising from economic theory and evidence and judicial experience has now spread across all of antitrust. The PNB presumption for mergers also has evolved as economic theory and evidence have advanced. Looking forward, merger presumptions should be neither abandoned nor set in stone; instead, they should be permitted to continue to evolve, based on new or additional economic factors besides market shares and concentration.
