= Ofgem =

United Kingdom government non-ministerial department

Office of Gas and Electricity Markets Welsh: Swyddfa’r Marchnadoedd Nwy a Thrydan

Non-ministerial government department overview
- Formed: 1 November 2000; 25 years ago
- Preceding agencies: Office of Electricity Regulation; Office of Gas Supply
- Jurisdiction: Great Britain
- Headquarters: Canary Wharf, London, E14
- Employees: 1,187
- Annual budget: For 2015–2016 Parliament approved through the Main Estimate a gross resource budget of £89.5 million
- Minister responsible: Miatta Fahnbulleh, Secretary of State for Energy Security and Net Zero
- Non-ministerial government department executive: Tim Jarvis, chief executive
- Website: ofgem.gov.uk

The Office of Gas and Electricity Markets (Ofgem) is the government regulator for the electricity and downstream natural gas markets in Great Britain. It was formed by the merger of the Office of Electricity Regulation (OFFER) and Office of Gas Supply (Ofgas).

Ofgem's governing body is the Gas and Electricity Markets Authority (GEMA), which is also referred to as the Ofgem board.

== Powers and duties ==
The authority's powers and duties are largely provided for in statute (such as the Gas Act 1986, the Electricity Act 1989, the Utilities Act 2000, the Competition Act 1998, the Enterprise Act 2002 and the Energy Act 2004, the Energy Act 2008 and the Energy Act 2010) as well as arising from directly effective European Union legislation. Duties and functions concerning gas are set out in the Gas Act and those relating to electricity are set out in the Electricity Act.

Its primary duty is to protect the interests of consumers, where possible by promoting competition.

The Authority‘s main objective is to protect existing and future consumers' interests in relation to gas conveyed through pipes and electricity conveyed by distribution or transmission systems. Consumers' interests are their interests taken as a whole, including their interests in the reduction of greenhouse gases and in the security of the supply of gas and electricity to them. Since 2010 the Authority has imposed nearly £100 million in fines and redress levies against energy suppliers, including a £12 million redress levy on E.ON in May 2014, and a £1 million redress levy on British Gas in July 2014.

== Structure ==
The Gas and Electricity Markets Authority is governed by the chairman, Mark McAllister, executive members, as well as non-executive members.

Jonathan Brearley was appointed chief executive of Ofgem from February 2020.

== Development of competition in the UK market ==
=== Background: Ofgas and OFFER ===
The liberalisation and privatisation of the energy markets in the United Kingdom began with the Margaret Thatcher Government in the 1980s (often called the Thatcher-Lawson agenda, due to the key role of Nigel Lawson in the Thatcher government cabinet). Aspects of the UK's model have been adopted by EU legislation.

The privatisation of the gas and electricity supply industries was enacted by the Gas Act 1986 and the Electricity Act 1989. Section 1 of the respective Acts created the roles of Director General of Gas Supply and the Office of Gas Supply (Ofgas), and the Director General of Electricity Supply and the Office of Electricity Regulation (OFFER). These were economic regulators independent of government, but accountable to Parliament. This arrangement separated their regulatory decisions from political control in order to provide greater long term regulatory certainty and to encourage market entry and investment. The duties of the regulators were prescribed in Section 4 of the Gas Act 1986 and Section 3 of the Electricity Act 1989.

Starting in the 1990s, the supply of electricity and gas to retail consumers in the UK has been unbundled from the rest of the industry. At the time of privatisation, British Gas and the regional public electricity suppliers held a monopoly on supplying all domestic gas and electricity consumers respectively. In 1997, British Gas was split (demerged) into Centrica and BG plc, in order to separate gas supply from its production and distribution. Between 1996 and 1999, domestic energy consumers were gradually able to choose their supplier. Finally, in May 1998 the domestic gas market was fully opened to competition, followed by the domestic electricity market in May 1999.

=== Role of Ofgem ===
Before there was competition in domestic markets, the regulators set price controls which fixed the maximum price that the monopoly suppliers could charge domestic customers. These controls remained in place when markets started to be liberalised, and were removed in stages between 2000 and 2002. Ofgem's decision to remove price controls was based on their assessment that competition was developing well at that time and that the Competition Act 1998, being effective since March 2000, would deter companies from the abuse of market power, and provide Ofgem with sufficient power to tackle any abuse. Moreover, consumer surveys showed good awareness of the ability to switch, high and rising switching rates away from the former monopoly suppliers, and substantial and continuing falls in their market shares.

Two years after the removal of the last price controls, in April 2004, Ofgem published a major review of the state of competition in the domestic energy supply markets, concluding that supply competition had delivered substantial benefits for all consumers and that the markets were competitive, though not yet mature. Between 2005 and 2007, Ofgem carried out a Supply Licence Review, resulting in simplification of supply licences, with the aim of reducing barriers to entry to the supply market, and enabling innovation. In 2006, Ofgem required the industry to set up and fund the Energy Supply Ombudsman in response to concerns over the handling of customer complaints.

Ofgem's Energy Supply Probe, published in 2008 after increases in world fuel prices led to the doubling of the energy bill for a typical household, found that the market was still dominated by the "Big Six" suppliers: more than 70% of customers were still with their former monopoly suppliers, and new entrants had captured less than 0.3% of the market. Ofgem implemented a number of measures which improved the information provided to customers and made it easier for them to switch suppliers. The Big Six were obliged to separate their accounting for the supply and generation businesses, and Ofgem noted concerns over market abuses and unfair pricing.

=== CMA investigation, 2014–2016 ===
In June 2014 Ofgem announced a Competition and Markets Authority (CMA) investigation into the trading practices and competitiveness of the country's "Big Six" energy companies: Centrica, SSE plc, RWE npower, E.ON, Scottish Power and EDF Energy. The investigation, which took two years, followed a referral by Ofgem to the competition regulator. "There is near-unanimous support for a referral and the CMA investigation offers an important opportunity to clear the air. This will help rebuild consumer trust and confidence in the energy market as well as provide the certainty investors have called for," Ofgem CEO Dermot Nolan in announcing the investigation. In August 2016 Ofgem said that it would implement the CMA's recommendation that suppliers should be required to provide the details of customers who have been on expensive tariffs for three years or more to rival suppliers. Ofgem also said that it would impose an interim price cap on customers using pre-payment meters.

=== Energy price caps ===
In October 2017, Prime Minister Theresa May announced her intention to introduce a cap on standard variable tariffs for energy customers, to be designed and implemented by Ofgem. The Domestic Gas and Electricity (Tariff Cap) Act 2018 (c. 21) received royal assent on 19 July 2018. It stipulated that the price cap would be in place from the end of 2018 until 2020, when Ofgem would recommend whether the cap should remain on an annual basis up to 2023. Ofgem would also review the level of the cap at least every six months; from October 2022 reviews were to be conducted every three months, to reflect volatility in wholesale prices.

Ofgem refers to this mechanism as the "default tariff" price cap, to distinguish it from the "prepayment" price cap, its other energy price cap.

=== Collapses of retail suppliers, 2021–2022 ===
Between July 2021 and May 2022, 29 retail suppliers of gas and electricity collapsed, largely due to unprecedented increases in wholesale gas prices. Ofgem arranged for their customers to be transferred to other companies but this was not possible for the 1.7 million customers of the largest company to enter administration, Bulb Energy, which instead entered a special administration regime underwritten by the UK government.

A July 2022 report "Energy pricing and the future of the energy market" by Parliament's Business, Energy and Industrial Strategy Committee found that Ofgem had been incompetent in its supervision of the finances of supplier companies, and that the government overlooked this lack of supervision because it prioritised competition over market regulation. In response, Ofgem accepted that its previous financial resilience regime was not sufficiently robust, and had contributed to some of the supplier failures since August 2021.

== Allegations of abuse of power relating to whistleblowers ==
In September 2018, the Guardian published a report claiming that two Ofgem experts had been independently threatened with criminal sanctions if they publicly revealed information. Ofgem allegedly invoked section 105 of the Utilities Act 2000, designed to protect national security, relating to concerns about smart meters and Renewable Heat Incentive projects.

== Alternative Dispute Resolution (ADR) ==
Under the Alternative Dispute Resolution for Consumer Disputes Regulations 2015, if an energy company fails to resolve a complaint through their own customer service efforts they will be required to advise the consumer of an approved ADR body.

Ofgem is the Competent Authority responsible for approving ADR entities in the energy sector. Ofgem has only ever approved one ADR entity: Ombudsman Services.

=== Energy Industry Voluntary Redress Scheme ===
Ofgem launched an Energy Industry Voluntary Redress Scheme in 2018 to redistribute money paid by energy companies who have breached their operating licence conditions. Recipients of the fund include vulnerable energy consumers and developers of energy products and services that reduce the environmental impact. The scheme is managed by the Energy Saving Trust.

Notable payments into the scheme include: £12.5M from PayPoint for breaking the 1998 Competition Act; £8.9M from OVO Energy for overcharging customers; £4.5M from Hornsea Wind Farm, £4.5M from Npower and £1.5M from UK Power Networks for failing to remain connected after a lightning strike causing a widespread blackout on 9 August 2019; £2.8M from OVO Energy, £2m from Scottish Power, £1.3M from British Gas, £1.2M from Shell Energy, £1M from SSE plc and amounts from £7k to £713k from 13 other energy suppliers for overcharging between 2013 and 2020; £1.5M from Utility Warehouse for treating customers unfairly and increasing their financial distress; and £1M from SSE for sending inaccurate customer statements.

== Key people ==
Directors general of Ofgas

- Sir James McKinnon, 1986 – October 1993
- Clare Spottiswoode, October 1993 – October 1998
- Callum McCarthy, 1998 – 2002. Following the retirement of Stephen Littlechild, Callum McCarthy assumed the combined role of Director General of Ofgas and Director General of OFFER.

Director general of OFFER

- Stephen Charles Littlechild (b.1943), September 1989 – 1998

Chair and chief executive of Ofgem

- Callum McCarthy, 1998 – October 2003. Following the end of tenure of Callum McCarthy the roles of chair and Chief executive officer were split.

Chair of Ofgem

- Sir John Mogg (Baron Mogg), October 2003 – 2013
- David Gray, 2013–September 2018
- Martin Cave, from September 2018

Chief executive officer of Ofgem

- Alistair Buchanan, October 2003 – 2013
- Andrew Wright, interim CEO, June 2013 – March 2014
- Dermot Nolan, March 2014 – February 2020
- Jonathan Brearley, from February 2020

== See also ==
- Consumer Futures (consumer watchdog)
- Energy in the United Kingdom
- Energy policy of the United Kingdom
- Electricity billing in the UK
- Energy switching services in the UK
