= Public electricity supplier =

Set of 14 electricity companies in the United Kingdom created in 1990

Public electricity suppliers (PES) were the fourteen electricity companies created in Great Britain in 1990, when the electricity market in the United Kingdom was privatised following the Electricity Act 1989. The Utilities Act 2000 subsequently split these companies between distribution network operators and separate supply companies.

Previously, in England and Wales the Central Electricity Generating Board had been responsible for the generation and transmission of electricity, with the twelve area electricity boards (AEBs) formed under the Electricity Act 1947 responsible for the distribution and supply of electricity to consumers.

In Scotland the structure was different, with all aspects of generation, transmission, distribution and supply being carried out by two vertically integrated companies.

== History ==
=== England and Wales ===
On 31 March 1990 the twelve area electricity boards were changed into independent regional electricity companies (RECs) and the CEGB was split into four parts: three generation companies and the National Grid Company, operator of the National Grid. The National Grid Company was placed under the ownership of the RECs. On 11 December 1990 the RECs were privatised.

In 2000, as part of further restructuring under the Utilities Act 2000, the PES were required to have separate licences for their supply business and distribution network. The companies holding the distribution licences became known as distribution network operators (DNOs).

=== Scotland ===
The Scottish boards were privatised whole in 1991 with the exception of the nuclear plants, which passed to Scottish Nuclear and were later privatised as part of British Energy.

== Companies ==
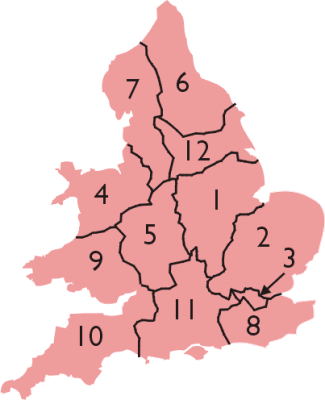
Regional electricity companies in England and Wales: 1. East Midlands Electricity; 2. Eastern Electricity; 3. London Electricity; 4. MANWEB; 5. Midlands Electricity; 6. North Eastern Electricity Board; 7. NORWEB; 8. SEEBOARD; 9. South Wales Electricity; 10. South Western Electricity; 11. Southern Electric; 12. Yorkshire Electricity

=== East Midlands Electricity ===
Formerly the East Midlands Electricity Board. Acquired by Powergen in 1998, which was itself taken over by multinational E.ON in 2002. The retail supply business continues to operate as E.ON UK.

After Powergen also acquired MEB in 2004, the two distribution networks were merged under the Central Networks name. The combined network was sold in 2011 and is now part of Western Power Distribution.

=== Eastern Electricity ===
Formerly the Eastern Electricity Board. Acquired by Hanson plc in 1995. Demerged from Hanson as part of The Energy Group, which was later sold to the US firm Texas Utilities and became TXU Energi, part of TXU Europe. In 2002 it was sold to Powergen, which was subsequently acquired by the German utility company E.On, and the operations were rebranded in 2004. The distribution business was owned by EDF. Now owned by UK Power Networks along with London Electricity and SEEBOARD.

=== London Electricity ===
Formerly the London Electricity Board. Acquired by US-based Entergy in 1996 for £1.3bn ($2.1bn). Acquired by EDF International in 1998, which merged it with SEEBOARD and Eastern Electricity to form EDF Energy. Now owned by UK Power Networks.

=== Manweb ===
Formerly the Merseyside and North Wales Electricity Board. Manweb plc was acquired by Scottish Power in 1995. Scottish Power was in turn acquired by the Spanish energy utility Iberdrola during 2017, although it continues to use Scottish Power branding on domestic sales of gas and electricity. The DNO for the area is SP Manweb plc, a subsidiary of SP Energy Networks.

=== Midlands Electricity ===
Formerly the Midlands Electricity Board. Originally acquired in 1996 by a consortium of US companies GPU and Cinergy, after a bid by Powergen was blocked by government. The electricity retail business was sold to National Power in 1999 and continues under the Npower brand.

The distribution business that remained was purchased by Powergen in 2004 and merged with that of East Midlands Electricity to form Central Networks. In 2011 the combined operation was sold and became part of Western Power Distribution.

=== Northern Electric ===
Formerly the North Eastern Electricity Board. The electricity distribution business is operated by Northern Powergrid, a subsidiary of Berkshire Hathaway Energy. The successor company to the retail supply business is npower UK.

=== NORWEB ===
Formerly the North Western Electricity Board. Merged with North West Water in 1995 to form United Utilities, the electricity businesses of which were subsequently sold, with the retail supply arm of Norweb becoming part of TXU Energi (now part of E.On) and the distribution network becoming Electricity North West.

=== Scottish Hydro-Electric ===
The North of Scotland Hydro Board became Scottish Hydro-Electric plc before merging with Southern Electric to form Scottish & Southern Energy (later trading simply as 'SSE') in 1998.

During 2020, SSE's retail business was sold to Ovo Energy. The distribution networks in Scotland and the south of England remain part of SSE plc and now trade under the name Scottish and Southern Electricity Networks.

=== Scottish Power ===
The South of Scotland Electricity Board became Scottish Power plc. In 2007 it was acquired by the Spanish energy utility Iberdrola, although it continues to use Scottish Power branding on domestic sales of gas and electricity. Its DNO subsidiary is SP Distribution plc, under SP Energy Networks.

=== SEEBOARD ===
Formerly the South Eastern Electricity Board. Owned by UK Power Networks along with Eastern Electricity and London Electricity. It markets to the public as part of CK Infrastructure Holdings (CKI).

=== South Wales Electricity ===
Formerly the South Wales Electricity Board, later known as SWALEC. The business was purchased by Welsh Water in 1996, but the company formed as a result - Hyder plc - soon encountered serious financial difficulties which led to its break-up.

The electricity retail business was initially sold to British Energy in June 1999 and then again in 2000 to Scottish and Southern Energy (SSE plc). During 2020, SSE's retail business was sold to Ovo Energy.

The distribution network was ultimately acquired by Western Power Distribution during September 2000.

=== South Western Electricity ===
Formerly the South Western Electricity Board, it was acquired by London Electricity (owned by EDF) in 1999. The distribution business is part of Western Power Distribution and the retail business is part of EDF Energy.

=== Southern Electric ===
Formerly the Southern Electricity Board, the company merged with Scottish Hydro-Electric plc to form Scottish & Southern Energy in 1998.

During 2020, SSE's retail business was sold to Ovo Energy. The distribution network remains part of SSE plc and now trades under the name Scottish and Southern Electricity Networks.

=== Yorkshire Electricity ===
Formerly the Yorkshire Electricity Board. Sold to Innogy (now npower) in 2001, and to the German utility RWE the following year. Now RWE npower, but most domestic marketing is under the npower brand. The electricity distribution business is operated by Northern Powergrid, a subsidiary of Berkshire Hathaway Energy.

== See also ==
- Electricity in Great Britain
- Electricity billing in the UK
- Electricity Commissioners
- Big Six energy suppliers
