= Meter Point Administration Number =

Identifier of mains electricity supply point

A Meter Point Administration Number, also known as MPAN, Supply Number or S-Number, is a 21-digit reference used in Great Britain to uniquely identify electricity supply points such as individual domestic properties. The system was introduced in 1998 to aid creation of a competitive environment for electricity supply companies, and assists consumers to switch their supplier as well as simplifying administration. Although the name suggests that an MPAN refers to a particular meter, an MPAN can have several meters associated with it, or none where it is an unmetered supply. A supply receiving power from the distribution network operator (DNO) has an import MPAN, while generation and microgeneration projects feeding back into the DNO network are given export MPANs.

The equivalent for gas supplies is the Meter Point Reference Number and the water/wastewater equivalent for non-household customers is the Supply Point ID.

== Structure ==
An MPAN is commonly separated into two sections: the core and the top line data. The core is the final 13 digits and is the unique identifier. The top line data gives information about the characteristics of the supply and is the responsibility of the supplier.

The full MPAN is required to be depicted on electricity bills (the boxes on the top and bottom line are generally unaligned).

The core data is on the second line, with supplementary data on the first line. Only the last digit on the bottom row is the check digit.

=== Profile Class (PC) ===
The first two digits of a full MPAN reflect its profile class.

00	Half-hourly supply (import and export)
01	Domestic unrestricted
02	Domestic Economy meter of two or more rates
03	Non-domestic unrestricted
04	Non-domestic Economy 7
05	Non-domestic, with maximum demand (MD) recording capability and with load factor (LF) less than or equal to 20%
06	Non-domestic, with MD recording capability and with LF less than or equal to 30% and greater than 20%
07	Non-domestic, with MD recording capability and with LF less than or equal to 40% and greater than 30%
08	Non-domestic, with MD recording capability and with LF greater than 40% (also all non-half-hourly export MSIDs)

Profile class 00 supplies are half-hourly (HH) metered, i.e. they record electricity consumption for every half hour of every day, and supplies of the other profile classes are non-half-hourly (NHH) metered. A NHH supply must be upgraded to HH where:

Any Metering System where the average of the maximum monthly electrical demands in the three months of highest demand, either in:

a. the previous twelve months; or
b. the period since the most recent Significant Change of Demand (whichever is the shorter)

exceeds 100kW.

Half-hourly data is recorded by the meter and collected by an onsite download, or by remote communication methods such as GSM, SMS, GPRS or telephone line.

Domestic NHH import MPANs always have a profile class of 01 or 02. Domestic NHH export MPANs are allocated a profile class of 08.

When the Metering System is migrated into the Marketwide Half-Hourly Settlement (MHHS) arrangements, the following applies: Continue as currently for MPANs with a Profile Class of ‘02’ or ‘04’ or populate with ‘00’ for any MPANs that do not have a Profile Class

=== Meter Time Switch Code (MTC) ===
The MTC is a three-digit code that reflects the various registers a meter may have, such as a single rate, day/night split, or a seasonal time of day.

MTC Ranges
001–399	DNO specific
400–499	Reserved
500–509	Codes for related Metering Systems – common across the Industry
510–799	Codes for related Metering Systems – DNO specific
800–999	Codes common across the Industry

When the Metering System is migrated into the Marketwide Half-Hourly Settlement (MHHS) arrangements, the following applies: Populate from the SSC Id valid set for Traditional Meters or Populate with ‘0000’ for any MPANs for which the SSC Id is not applicable

=== Line Loss Factor Class (LLFC) ===
The Line Loss Factor Class or LLFC is an alphanumeric code used to identify the related Distribution Use of System (DUoS) charges for the MPAN. The figure reflects both the amount of distribution infrastructure used to supply the exit point and the amount of energy lost through heating of cables, transformers, etc.

=== Core ===
The MPAN core is the final 13 digits of the MPAN, and uniquely identifies an exit point. It consists of a two-digit Distributor ID, followed by an eight-digit unique identifier, then two digits and a single check digit.

==== Distributor ID ====
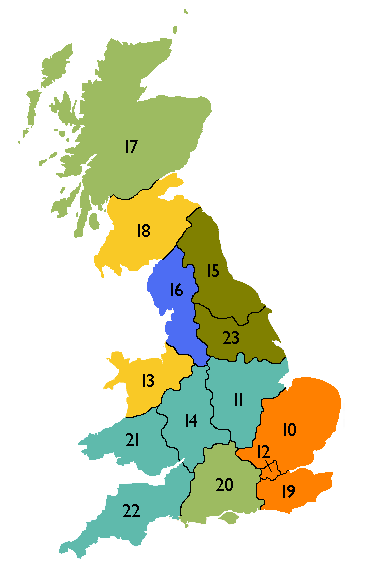
Map of DNO licence areas

Great Britain is divided into fourteen distribution areas. For each area a single company, the distribution network operator, has a licence to distribute electricity. They effectively carry electricity from the National Grid to the exit points (each having a unique MPAN and a possibility of several meters) where the customers are. The owner of the distribution network charges electricity suppliers for carrying the electricity in their network. Their DNO licensed regions are the same geographic areas as the former nationalised electricity boards.

DNOs
ID	Name	Operator	Phone Number	Market Participant ID	GSP Group ID
10	Eastern England	UK Power Networks	0800 029 4285	EELC	_A
11	East Midlands	National Grid (formerly Western Power Distribution)	0800 096 3080	EMEB	_B
12	London	UK Power Networks	0800 029 4285	LOND	_C
13	Merseyside and Northern Wales	SP Energy Networks	0330 10 10 444	MANW	_D
14	West Midlands	National Grid (formerly Western Power Distribution)	0800 096 3080	MIDE	_E
15	North Eastern England	Northern Powergrid	0800 011 3332	NEEB	_F
16	North Western England	Electricity North West	0800 048 1820	NORW	_G
17	Northern Scotland	Scottish & Southern Electricity Networks	0800 048 3516	HYDE	_P
18	Southern Scotland	SP Energy Networks	0330 10 10 444	SPOW	_N
19	South Eastern England	UK Power Networks	0800 029 4285	SEEB	_J
20	Southern England	Scottish & Southern Electricity Networks	0800 048 3516	SOUT	_H
21	Southern Wales	National Grid (formerly Western Power Distribution)	0800 096 3080	SWAE	_K
22	South Western England	National Grid (formerly Western Power Distribution)	0800 096 3080	SWEB	_L
23	Yorkshire	Northern Powergrid	0800 011 3332	YELG	_M

In addition to the distribution network operators noted above who are licensed for a specific geographic area, there are also independent distribution network operators (IDNOs). These own and operate electricity distribution networks which are mostly extensions of the main network, e.g. to serve new housing developments.

Scottish Hydro Electric Power Distribution also provide distribution services in South Scotland as an IDNO, and Southern Electric Power Distribution provide IDNO services in all other areas of England and Wales (both of these are trading names of Scottish and Southern Electricity Networks). Other IDNOs have no "base" area.

Independent Distribution Network Operators
ID	Name	Licensee	Market Participant Id
24	GTC	Independent Power Networks Limited	IPNL
25	ESP Electricity	ESP Electricity	LENG
26	Last Mile / Energetics (Formerly)	Last Mile Electricity Limited	GUCL
27	GTC	The Electricity Network Company Ltd	ETCL
28	EDF IDNO	UK Power Networks (IDNO) Ltd	EDFI (no longer live)
29		Harlaxton Energy Networks Ltd	HARL
30		Leep Electricity Networks Ltd	PENL
31		UK Power Distributions Ltd	UKPD
32	Energy Assets Networks	Energy Assets Networks Ltd	UDNL
33	EPN	Eclipse Power Networks Ltd	GGEN
34		Murphy Power Distribution Limited	MPDL
35	Fulcrum Electricity Assets	Fulcrum Electricity Assets Ltd	FEAL
36	Vattenfall Networks	Vattenfall Network Limited	VATT
37	Forbury Assets Limited	Forbury Assets Limited	FORB
38	Indigo Power Limited	Indigo Power Limited	INDI
39	Squire Energy Metering Ltd	Squire Energy Metering Ltd	STRK
40	Utility Assets Limited	Utility Assets Limited	UTAL
42	Advanced Electricity Networks	Advanced Electricity Networks	AENL
43	IDCS Ltd	IDCS Ltd	IDCS
44	Green GEN Cymru	Green GEN Cymru	GGCL
45	Aurora Utilities Limited	Aurora Utilities Limited	AURO
46	Aidien Limited	Aidien Limited	AIDI
47	Vital Energi Power Networks	Vital Energi Power Networks	VEPN
48	E.ON UK Network Assets Limited	E.ON UK Network Assets Limited	EONN
50	Edge Utility Networks Limited	Edge Utility Networks Limited	EUNL
51	AGR Networks Ltd	AGR Networks Ltd	AGRN
52	Grid Line Power Networks Ltd	Grid Line Power Networks Ltd	GLPN
53	Sphere Energy Connect Limited	Sphere Energy Connect Limited	SECL

== MPAN state ==
The supply identified by the MPAN can be in one of four states: disconnected, de-energised, live, and new.

- Disconnected: The service cable has been removed and the MPAN will not be reused.
- De-energised: The service cable is in place, but the fuse has been removed. The meter remains connected to the distribution network, but no electricity can be used.
- Live: Both the service cable and the fuse are in place. The supply is fully operational.
- New: A new MPAN has been generated, however, the top line (supplementary data consisting of the Profile Class and Meter Time-Switch Code) is not yet complete. The service cable may or may not be installed.

These terms are by no means standardised. For example, a disconnected supply might be referred to as a 'dead' supply.

== Export MPANs ==
The vast majority of MPANs are import MPANs, where energy is being consumed. However, if a supply exports to the distribution network, then an export MPAN can be issued. If a supply both imports and exports, then both an import MPAN and export MPAN are issued.

=== Microgeneration ===
Formerly, export MPANs required a half-hourly compliant meter to be installed. Since 2003, it has been possible for microgeneration projects with a capacity of 30 kW or below to have a non-half-hourly meter to measure export back into the distribution network. Uptake was slow, with the first microgeneration export MPAN being issued in June 2005. Some suppliers may not bother to register the export MPAN in MPAS as the revenue is so small.

Following the closure of the feed-in tariffs, in January 2020 Ofgem introduced the Smart Export Guarantee (SEG) arrangements, where an export MPAN is allocated to allow a supplier to pay a customer for export of low-carbon energy.

Export capacity over 30 kW is required to be half-hourly metered. As part of the Marketwide Half Hourly Arrangements (MHHS), all export consumption will be required to be registered and settled on a half-hourly basis.

== Metered Supply Point ==
The Metered Supply Point (MSP) is the point at which the meter measuring a customer's consumption is located. It is thus also the point at which either the distribution network operator's supply, or the building network operator's lateral cable, terminates and the customer's equipment begins. In order to firmly establish a supply's MSP, the MPAN needs to be associated with a meter serial number.

Although it is common for an MPAN to be associated with one meter serial number, in some cases there is a many-to-many relationship. For example, one meter could be associated with both an import and an export MPAN, or one MPAN could be measured by three separate meters.

== Metering Code of Practice ==
Code of Practice
Code	Range	Configuration
COP10	less than 72 kW	One HH whole current meter installed. Introduced in February 2009.
COP5	less than 1MW	One HH meter installed.
COP3	1MW to 10MW	Two meters installed, main and check, both recording the same load, the main meter being used for billing.
COP2	10MW to 100MW	Two meters installed as in COP3, but higher-accuracy class meters.
COP1	> 100MW	Very few sites in the UK at this level, generally power stations and connections with the National Grid.

== Unmetered supplies ==
It is possible for small predictable supplies to be unmetered. Examples are streetlights, traffic signals, signs, bollards, telephone kiosks, CCTV and advertising displays.

For an item of equipment to be connected to the distribution network via an unmetered connection, its consumption should typically not exceed 500 watts and it should operate in a predictable manner, with no provision for it to be manually turned on/off at the end user's request. Generally the equipment would either be in operation and taking a supply of electricity 24 hours a day, or be controlled by a photocell, as is often the case for streetlights.

It is the customer's responsibility to maintain an accurate and up-to-date inventory of unmetered supplies, and to inform the UMSO (UnMetered Supplies Operator) of all changes to the connected equipment within one month of the change.

Larger local authorities generally have unmetered supplies with total demand over 100kW and are required to trade their unmetered energy on a half-hourly basis. To do so, they employ a meter administrator who will use daily data from a photo-electric control unit (PECU) array which is then used to calculate the energy consumption. A PECU array is a device that holds a representative number of the photocells that authority uses on their streetlights or traffic signals. By trading energy as unmetered half-hourly, the authority accurately pays for the energy consumed by their declared unmetered equipment, and because the data is downloaded daily the authority will see their energy invoices change throughout the year in response to the seasonal changes in light levels.

As a result of Ofgem's decision to progress with Marketwide Half Hourly Settlement (MHHS), under modification P434 it was agreed that all new unmetered supplies from April 2024 would be half-hourly and existing non half-hourly unmetered supplies would move to half-hourly trading during 2024/25. By October 2025 all non half-hourly MPANs had been transferred to half-hourly. In December 2025, Power Data Associates – acting in the MHHS role of Unmetered Data Service – registered the first MPAN in the new MHHS arrangements.

If the equipment is street lighting, the annual hours will change as each photocell is assigned a set number of annual hours which indicate how and when the lights turn on and off. These annual hours are set by Elexon and are not locally agreed with the UMSO by the customer.

The DNO make a Distribution Use of System charge on the electricity supplier for the delivery of the electricity to the customer's unmetered equipment.

== Standard Settlement Configuration (SSC) ==
Each non-half-hourly supply has a four-digit code called the Standard Settlement Configuration (SSC), which specifies the number of registers a meter has, and the times that each register is recording electricity usage. The times that a register is recording is specified with a five digit code Time Pattern Regime (TPR). For example, a supply with SSC 0943 has two registers with TPRs 00404 and 00405. The 00404 TPR register records from 01:00 to 02:30 and 08:00 to 23:30, and the 00405 register records for the rest of the time.

== Meter Point Administration System ==
Each DNO operates a Meter Point Administration System (MPAS) which holds the following information for each MPAN:

- Supplier
- Data Collector (DC)
- Data Aggregator (DA)
- Meter Operator (MOP) or Meter Administrator for HH unmetered
- Customer
- Address of the exit point
- Associated MPANs
- MPAN state
- Profile Class (PC)
- Line Loss Factor Class (LLFC)
- Meter Time Switch Class (MTC)
- GSP Group

MPRS is the name of the software package that implements the MPAS system for all DNOs. Since MPRS is used by most DNOs it is often used interchangeably with the term MPAS.

== ECOES ==
ECOES (formally the Electricity Central Online Enquiry Service) and now the Electricity Enquiry Service (EES) is a website that allows users and authorised industry parties to search for supply details (past and present) using such things as the 13-digit MPAN bottom line number, the meter serial number or the postcode. The database has details relating to the supply including the full address, meter details, the current energisation status and also the appointed parties (i.e. the supplier, distributor, MOP, DC and DA). The site is populated from information sent from the Supplier Meter Registration Service (SMRS) regarding the metering system.

Only non-domestic users (with two valid MPANs that are not Profile Class 1 or 2) can register to access this service.

== Check digit modulus ==
=== Check digit ===
The final digit in the MPAN is the check digit, and validates the previous 12 (the core) using a modulus 11 test. The check digit is calculated thus:

1. Multiply the first digit by 3
2. Multiply the second digit by the next prime number (5)
3. Repeat this for each digit (missing 11 out on the list of prime numbers for the purposes of this algorithm)
4. Add up all these products
5. The check digit is the sum modulo 11 modulo 10.

MPAN verification examples
The algorithm in Java is:

int checkDigit(String toCheck) {
    int[] primes = {3, 5, 7, 13, 17, 19, 23, 29, 31, 37, 41, 43};
    int sum = 0;
    for (int i = 0; i < primes.length; i++) {
        sum += Character.getNumericValue(toCheck.charAt(i)) * primes[i];
    }
    return sum % 11 % 10;
}

In Matlab:

function check = checkdigits(MPANCore)
% MPANCore is a cell array of 13 digit strings.
% Check is a boolean vector the same size as MPANCore.
% (100,000 MPANs in 0.05 seconds.)

core = double(char(MPANCore)')-48; c = core(1:12,:);
p = [3 5 7 13 17 19 23 29 31 37 41 43]' * ones(1, size(c, 2));
m = mod(mod(sum(p.*c), 11), 10); k = core(13,:); check = m == k;

In Pascal / Delphi:

function CheckDigit(MPANCore : array of Byte): Integer;
const
  Primes : array [0..11] of Byte = (3, 5, 7, 13, 17, 19, 23, 29, 31, 37, 41, 43);
var
  i : integer;
begin
  Result := 0;

  for i := 0 to 11 do
    Result := Result + (MPANCore[i] * Primes[i]);

  Result := Result mod 11 mod 10;
end;

In Ruby:

# where mpan is a string
def check_digit(mpan)
  primes = [3, 5, 7, 13, 17, 19, 23, 29, 31, 37, 41, 43]
  (0..11).inject(0) { |sum, n| sum + (mpan[n, 1].to_i * primes[n]) } % 11 % 10
end

In Visual Basic:

Public Function mpancheck(mpan As String) As Boolean

    ' Michael Diarmid (EDF)
    ' Updated 04/08/2010 MD
    ' Returns True / False if MPAN is valid
  
On Error GoTo inval

    Dim c As Variant, sum As Integer, i as Byte   
    c = Array(0, 3, 5, 7, 13, 17, 19, 23, 29, 31, 37, 41, 43)

    For i = 1 To 12
        sum = sum + (Mid(mpan, i, 1) * c(i))
    Next i

    If Right(mpan, 1) = ((sum Mod 11) Mod 10) Then
        mpancheck = True
    Else
inval:
        mpancheck = False
    End If
 
End Function

In VisualBasic.Net 2010:

Public Function mpancheck(mpan As String) As Boolean

        ' Michael Diarmid (EDF)
        ' Updated 04/08/2010 MD
        ' Returns True / False if MPAN is valid
        ' Revised by Tym Huckin (16/03/2012) for VB 2010

        On Error GoTo inval

        Dim c As Object, sum As Integer

        c = New List(Of Integer) From {0, 3, 5, 7, 13, 17, 19, 23, 29, 31, 37, 41, 43}

        For i = 1 To 12
            sum = sum + (Mid(mpan, i, 1) * c(i))
        Next i

        If sRight(mpan, 1) = ((sum Mod 11) Mod 10) Then
            Return True
        Else
inval:
            Return False
        End If

    End Function
    Public Function sRight(sSTRING As String, iLEN As Integer) As String
        Dim sRET As String = ""
        Try
            If iLEN >= Len(sSTRING) Then
                sRET = sSTRING
            End If
            sRET = Mid(sSTRING, Len(sSTRING) - (iLEN - 1), iLEN)
        Catch ex As Exception
            sRET = ""
        End Try
        Return sRET

    End Function

Or VB.Net 2010, avoiding the use of VB6 Compatibility Library :

    ''' <summary>
    ''' Validates an MPAN number
    ''' </summary>
    ''' <param name="mpan">At least the last 13 digits from the MPAN number, including the check digit, 
    ''' expressed as a string</param>
    ''' <returns>True for valid, otherwise false</returns>
    ''' <remarks>Written by Martin Milan, May 2012, avoiding use of VB6 compatibility library, for .Net 4.0 Client Profile</remarks>
    Public Function MPANIsValid(mpan As String) As Boolean
        
        ' Set initial conditions.
        Dim validationResult As Boolean = False
        
        If mpan.Length > 12 Then
            
            'Read the check digit into an Integer variable.
            Dim intCheckDigit As Integer
            If Integer.TryParse(mpan.Substring(mpan.Length - 1), intCheckDigit) Then
                
                Dim strTest As String = mpan.Substring(mpan.Length-13,12)
                Dim intPrimes() As Integer = { 3, 5, 7, 13, 17, 19, 23, 29, 31, 37, 41, 43}
                Dim productTotal As Integer = 0
                Dim blnError As Boolean = False
                
                For i As Integer = 0 To 11 Step 1
                    Dim intTestDigit As Integer
                    If Integer.TryParse(mpan.Substring(i,1), intTestDigit) Then
                        productTotal += (intTestDigit * intPrimes(i))
                    Else
                        blnError = True
                        Exit For
                    End If
                Next
                
                If Not blnError Then
                    validationResult = ((productTotal Mod 11 Mod 10) = intCheckDigit)    
                Else
                    validationResult = False ' Due to a parsing error.    
                End If
                
            End If
            
        End If
        
        Return validationResult
        
    End Function

In C#:

    /// <summary>
    /// Validates an MPAN number.
    /// </summary>
    /// <param name="mpan">At least the last 13 digits from the MPAN number, including the check digit, 
    /// expressed as a string.</param>
    /// <returns>True for valid, otherwise false.</returns>
    public static bool MpanIsValid(string mpan)
    {
        // Set initial conditions.
        bool validationResult = false;

        if (mpan.Length > 12)
        {
            // Read the check digit into an Integer variable.
            int intCheckDigit = 0;
            if (int.TryParse(mpan.Substring(mpan.Length - 1), out intCheckDigit))
            {
                string strTest = mpan.Substring(mpan.Length - 13, 12);
                int[] intPrimes = {3, 5, 7, 13, 17, 19, 23, 29, 31, 37, 41, 43};
                int productTotal = 0;
                bool blnError = false;

                for (int i = 0; i <= 11; i++)
                {
                    int intTestDigit = 0;
                    if (int.TryParse(strTest.Substring(i, 1), out intTestDigit))
                    {
                        productTotal += (intTestDigit * intPrimes[i]);
                    }
                    else
                    {
                        blnError = true;
                        break; 
                    }
                }

                if (!blnError)
                {
                    validationResult = ((productTotal % 11 % 10) == intCheckDigit);
                }
                else
                {
                    validationResult = false; // Due to a parsing error.    
                }
            }
        }

        return validationResult;
    }

As a formula in Excel 365:

'MPAN in Cell A1

=IF(RIGHT(MOD(SUM(MID(A1,SEQUENCE(12),1)*{3;5;7;13;17;19;23;29;31;37;41;43}),11))=RIGHT(A1),"Correct","Invalid MPAN")

In Python:

def check_digit(mpan):
    """Check MPAN digit.

    Args:
      mpan -- The first 12 digits of the MPAN number, excluding the check digit.
    """
    return sum(prime * int(digit) for prime, digit in \
            zip([3, 5, 7, 13, 17, 19, 23, 29, 31, 37, 41, 43], mpan)) % 11 % 10

In PL/SQL:

create or replace function mpan_check(mpan in varchar2) return boolean is
  --CDP ATKINSON
  res integer := 0;
  TYPE prime_tab IS VARRAY(12) OF integer;
  primes prime_tab := prime_tab (3, 5, 7, 13, 17, 19, 23, 29, 31, 37, 41, 43);
begin  
  for i in 1..12 loop    
    res := res + to_number( substr( mpan, i, 1) ) * primes (i);
  end loop;  
  return to_char(mod(mod(res , 11) , 10)) = substr(mpan,13,1);
end mpan_check;

In JavaScript:

function checkMPAN(mpan) {
    var primes = [3, 5, 7, 13, 17, 19, 23, 29, 31, 37, 41, 43];
    var sum = 0;
    var m = mpan.toString();

    if (m.length - 1 === primes.length) {
        for (var i = 0; i < primes.length; i++) {
            sum += parseInt(m.charAt(i)) * primes[i];
        }
        return sum % 11 % 10 === parseInt(m.charAt(12));
    }

    return false;
}

In PHP:

function checkMPAN($mpan)
{
    $primes = array(3, 5, 7, 13, 17, 19, 23, 29, 31, 37, 41, 43);
    $sum = 0;
    $mpan = str_split($mpan);
    	
    if ((count($mpan) - 1) == count($primes)) {
        for ($i = 0; $i < count($primes); $i++) {
    	    $sum += $mpan[$i] * $primes[$i];
    	}
    	return (($sum % 11 % 10) == end($mpan)) ? true : false;
    } else {
    	return false;
    }
}

In SQL Server:

CREATE FUNCTION is_valid_mpan 
(  @mpan    VARCHAR(50)  )
RETURNS INT
AS
  BEGIN
	--Tim Foster (2013-01-04)
	DECLARE @is_mpan	INT
		,@x		INT = 1
		,@sum		INT = 0
			
	DECLARE	@arr	TABLE (id INT IDENTITY(1, 1), val INT)
	
	INSERT INTO @arr(val) VALUES(3),(5),(7),(13),(17),(19),(23),(29),(31),(37),(41),(43)
	
	WHILE @x <= 12
	  BEGIN
		SELECT	@sum	= @sum + (SUBSTRING(@mpan, @x, 1) * val)
		FROM	@arr
		WHERE	id	= @x
		
		SELECT @x = @x + 1
	  END
	  
	IF RIGHT(@mpan, 1) = ((@sum % 11) % 10)
	  BEGIN
		SELECT @is_mpan = 1
	  END
	ELSE
	  BEGIN
		SELECT @is_mpan = 0
	  END

	RETURN @is_mpan
END

In MySQL:

CREATE DEFINER=`root`@`%` FUNCTION `is_valid_mpan`(mpan varchar(13)) RETURNS int(11)
begin

	DECLARE is_mpan	INT;
	DECLARE x		INT;
	DECLARE sum		INT;
	declare ret     int;
	
	set x = 1;
	set sum = 0;
		
		
	CREATE TEMPORARY TABLE IF NOT EXISTS arr
	SELECT 1 `id`, 3 `val` union all
	SELECT 2 `id`, 5 `val` union all
	SELECT 3 `id`, 7 `val` union all
	SELECT 4 `id`, 13 `val` union all
	SELECT 5 `id`, 17 `val` union all
	SELECT 6 `id`, 19 `val` union all
	SELECT 7 `id`, 23 `val` union all
	SELECT 8 `id`, 29 `val` union all
	SELECT 9 `id`, 31 `val` union all
	SELECT 10 `id`, 37 `val` union all
	SELECT 11 `id`, 41 `val` union all
	SELECT 12 `id`, 43 `val`;
			
	WHILE x <= 12 DO
	
		SELECT (SUBSTRING(mpan, x, 1) * val)
		into ret
		FROM	arr
		WHERE	id	= x;
		
		set sum = sum + ret;
		
		set x = x + 1;
		
 	END while;
	  
	IF RIGHT(mpan, 1) = ((sum % 11) % 10) then
		set is_mpan = 1;
	ELSE
		set is_mpan = 0;
	end if;
	
	drop TEMPORARY table arr;
	  
	RETURN is_mpan;

end;

In Swift 3 is:

 func isValid(mpan: String) -> Bool {
        let primes = [3, 5, 7, 13, 17, 19, 23, 29, 31, 37, 41, 43]
        let chars = Array(mpan.characters).map({Int(String($0))}).flatMap({$0})
        return zip(primes, chars).reduce(0) { $0 + $1.0 * $1.1} % 11 % 10 == chars.last!
    }

In Apex (Salesforce):

    /**
    * @description Validates an MPAN. Written by Adam Dry June 2018. Apex version 43
    * @param mpan the 13 digit MPAN including the check digit on the end
    */
    public Boolean mpanIsValid(String mpan) {

        List<Integer> primes = new List<Integer>{3, 5, 7, 13, 17, 19, 23, 29, 31, 37, 41, 43};

        // Read the check digit into an Integer variable
        Integer checkDigit = Integer.valueOf(mpan.right(1));

        String strTest = mpan.substring(0, 12);
        Integer productTotal = 0;

        for (Integer i = 0; i <= 11; i++) {
            Integer testDigit = Integer.valueOf(strTest.Substring(i, i + 1));
            productTotal += (testDigit * primes[i]);
        }

        Integer computedCheck = Math.mod(Math.mod(productTotal, 11), 10);        
        Boolean validationResult = (computedCheck == checkDigit);

        return validationResult;
    }

== See also ==
- Energy management software
- Meter operator
- Distribution network operator
- Electricity billing in the UK
