= Integrated Utility Services UK =

Integrated Utility Services IUS
- Company type: Subsidiary
- Industry: Energy
- Founded: 1996
- Headquarters: Wakefield, England, United Kingdom
- Number of employees: 170
- Parent: Northern Powergrid
- Website: IUS

Integrated Utility Services is a high voltage electrical contracting business owned by an electrical distribution company and is based in Yorkshire in England. It is owned by Northern Powergrid which is the distribution network operator for the North East England and Yorkshire regions.

== History ==
The company was created after the takeover of Northern Electric by CalEnergy in 1996. The company disposed of the supply business of Northern Electric to Innogy in 2001 in exchange for the distribution business of Yorkshire Electricity.
