= Northern Electric =

English power supply company

- Industry: Electricity
- Predecessor: North Eastern Electricity Board
- Founded: 1947
- Defunct: 1996
- Fate: Acquired
- Successor: CE Electric
- Headquarters: Newcastle upon Tyne, UK

Northern Electric was an electricity supply and distribution company serving north east England.

== History ==
It had its origins as the North Eastern Electricity Board, formed as part of the nationalisation of the electricity industry by the Electricity Act 1947.

The assets of the board were transferred to Northern Electric plc in March 1990, and the company was privatised in December of the same year. At the end of 1996 the company was acquired by American corporation, CalEnergy, which formed a subsidiary, CE Electric to manage Northern Electric.

The company was split into supply and distribution arms under the Utilities Act 2000. In 2001, the supply business was disposed in an asset swap with npower, exchanging the North East consumer business for the distribution arm of Yorkshire Electricity.

The North East England distribution arm was retained by CE Electric, renamed Northern Electric Distribution Limited (NEDL) and merged with the newly acquired distribution arm of Yorkshire Electricity, which was renamed Yorkshire Electricity Distribution Ltd (YEDL) to form CE Electric UK. It is licensed as the distribution network operator for the North East England region by the Office of Gas and Electricity Markets.

== See also ==
- Companies merged into North Eastern Electricity Board (NEEB)
- Meter Point Administration Number
- Public electricity supplier
