= Meter serial number =

Identifier for an electric meter in Britain

A meter serial number (MSN, or 'meter ID') is an alphanumeric reference used in Great Britain to identify an electricity meter. Although meter serial numbers are intended to be unique, this can not be assured and duplicate serial numbers do exist. There are a variety of formats used over many years, but many meter serial numbers take the form A##AA###### (e.g. S06DS123456). The first letter indicates the manufacturer, the first two digits indicate the year the meter was calibrated and certified, and the second letter (or pair of letters) indicates the company that purchased the meter. The five/six digit sequence is a serial batch number. There may be a space separating the groups of numbers and letters.

Electricity meters in other countries besides Great Britain do not necessarily follow this standard.

Manufacturer Codes
| Letter | Manufacturer |
|---|---|
| A, B, D, Z | AMPY (now owned by Landis + Gyr) |
| C | CEWE |
| D | Landis + Gyr |
| E | EDMI |
| F | Siemens Metering Ltd (also FML, Ferranti) |
| H | Secure Controls |
| I | Iskraemeco |
| J | Jinling (Shanghai Electricity) |
| K | Elster/ABB |
| L | Landis + Gyr |
| M | General Electric |
| P | (PRI) Polymeters Response International |
| R | Sagem |
| S | Actaris/Schlumberger (now owned by Itron) |

Purchaser Codes
| Code | Purchaser |
|---|---|
| BG | BGlobal |

== See also ==
- Electricity billing in the UK
- Meter Point Administration Number (MPAN)
