= YEB =

Yeb may refer to:

- The Nile island of Elephantine, referred to in the Elephantine papyri and the site of a Jewish temple in the 4th and 5th centuries BCE.
- Yorkshire Electricity of England.
