= David L. Sokol =

American business executive (born 1956)

David Sokol
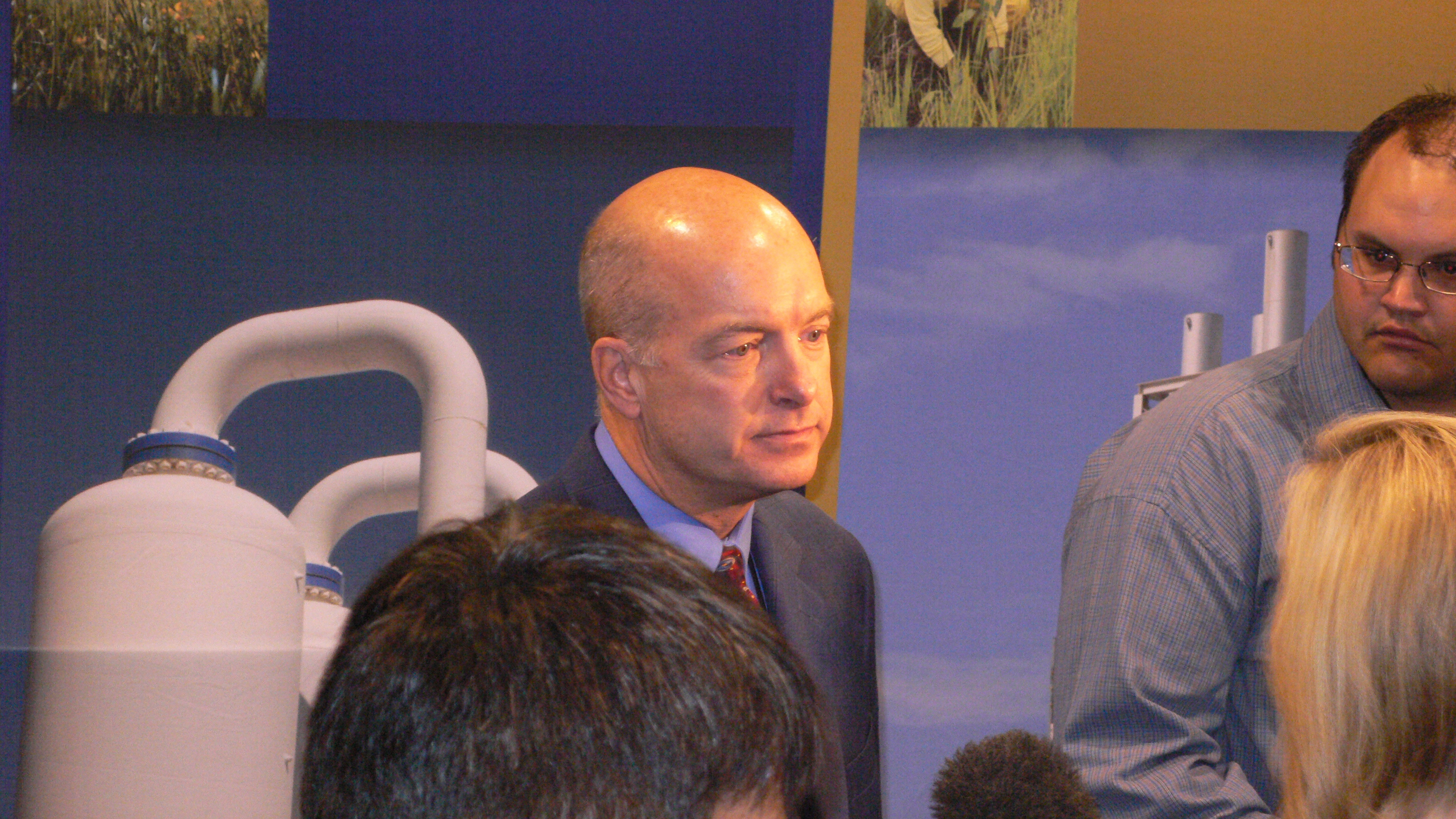
- Sokol in 2009
- Born: September 1956 (age 70); Omaha, Nebraska, U.S.
- Education: University of Nebraska, Omaha (BS)

David L. Sokol (born September 1956) is an American business executive. He is a chairman of Teton Capital LLC, headquartered in Wilson, Wyoming. He was chairman, president, and CEO of NetJets, as well as a chairman of MidAmerican Energy Holdings Company, of which Berkshire Hathaway holds a 100% and 89.8% stake respectively.

== Early life ==
The youngest of five children, David L. Sokol was born in 1956 in Omaha, Nebraska. At the time of his birth, his father managed a grocery store in Omaha and his parents had been married for 25 years. Sokol's eldest sibling is 23 years older than he. Sokol attended a Catholic grade school and public high school.

When Sokol was 11, his mother was diagnosed with breast cancer. To help out with expenses, Sokol worked as a paperboy, a caddie, and a janitor at a hardware store. He also helped local farmers bale hay. In high school, he worked as a maintenance manager for an apartment complex. He also worked for a local grocery store, where he started as a bagger and later became the night manager.

Sokol was able to keep this job when he entered the University of Nebraska, Omaha. Shortly before the end of his junior year in college, Sokol got married. He moved out of his parents' home and into a trailer with his bride, Peggy. By the time he graduated with a degree in civil engineering, he had a child on the way. Sokol graduated in 1978 and went to work as a structural engineer for the American company HDR, Inc.

== Education ==
He holds Bachelor in a chair of Science in Civil Engineering from the University of Nebraska, Omaha in 1978 and Honorary Doctorate from Bellevue University, Bellevue, Nebraska.

== Professional career ==
Previously, Sokol served as the chief executive officer of MidAmerican Energy Holdings Company (formerly CalEnergy Company Inc.) a subsidiary of Berkshire Hathaway Inc. from April 19, 1993 to April 16, 2008. He was the president of MidAmerican Energy Holdings from April 19, 1993 to January 21, 1995.

Formerly, among other positions held in the independent power industry, Sokol was president and chief executive officer of Kiewit Energy Company, which was a wholly owned subsidiary of Peter Kiewit Sons' Inc., and Ogden Projects Inc.

He was chief executive officer and chairman of the board of managers of MidAmerican Funding LLC, a subsidiary of MidAmerican Energy Holdings, since its formation in March 1999.

Sokol is the chairman of Ce Casecnan Water & Energy Co., Inc. He previously was chairman of Omaha Metropolitan Entertainment and Convention Authority and as a director of Omaha Airport Authority. He was the chairman of MidAmerican Energy Holdings Company since May 1994. He is chairman of HomeServices of America, Inc. (formerly HomeServices.Com Inc.) since inception in July 1999.

He was chairman of Northern Electric PLC. He has been a director of HomeServices of America, Inc. since July 1999. He had been director of MidAmerican Energy Holdings since March 1991. He was a director of MidAmerican Funding LLC, since formation in March 1999. He was non-executive director of BYD Company Ltd. from August 4, 2009 to April 1, 2011.

He was a director of Northern Electric PLC from January 1997 to June 1, 2007. Prior to this, he was a director of CE Electric UK Funding Company until June 1, 2007.

=== Berkshire Hathaway ===
Prior to his abrupt resignation in March 2011, Sokol was widely regarded as the likely successor to Warren Buffett. Often referred to as Buffett's Mr. Fix-It, Sokol was tasked with rescuing underperforming Berkshire divisions Johns Manville and NetJets. Under Sokol's leadership Johns Manville was brought back on track, and NetJets swung from a $157 million pre-tax loss in 2009 to pre-tax earnings of $207 million in 2010.

Sokol was also integral in the selection of acquisition targets at Berkshire. In 2008, Sokol flew to China to research car manufacturer BYD, which resulted in Berkshire acquiring a $230 million stake. This position was worth over $1.5 billion in 2010. Later in 2008, Sokol engineered the acquisition of Constellation Energy for $4.7 billion, sparing the company from bankruptcy.

==== Lawsuits ====
In April 2010, a Douglas County judge found that Sokol, who was the CEO of MidAmerican Energy Holdings Company, decided to change future profit calculations in such a way that it eliminated the stake in a 1990s Philippines project for San Lorenzo Ruiz Builders & Developers Group. The judge said that Sokol and MidAmerican had acted "willfully and intentionally". The court levied a $32 million ruling against MidAmerican. This ruling may be worth $140 million in future profits.

In a second case, courts in San Francisco and Omaha ruled against MidAmerican for a total of $52 million in past profits, while also restoring ownership to La Prairie and San Lorenzo. These rights could amount to $280 million in future profits.

The third lawsuit for $150 million alleges that Sokol "secretly resumed negotiations" that led to a lower projected profit.

==== Resignation and Lubrizol-related share activity ====
Sokol purchased 96,060 shares of Lubrizol at a limit price of $104 per share between January 5 and 7, 2011. He presented the idea of Berkshire's acquiring Lubrizol to Buffett on January 14 or 15, 2011, and again after a January 25 meeting with Lubrizol's CEO. Berkshire Hathaway's board voted to acquire Lubrizol at $135 per share on March 13, 2011.

On March 28, 2011, Sokol tendered his resignation from Berkshire Hathaway. In his press release detailing the resignation, Buffett detailed trading activity surrounding the Lubrizol acquisition, emphasizing that he did not believe anything unlawful transpired. However at the Berkshire annual meeting that year Buffett said he did not have the full facts before the initial press release was released, adding that he found Sokol's actions "inexplicable" and "inexcusable".

== Other ==
In 2008, he authored and self-published Pleased But Not Satisfied, which described his business philosophy.

Since departing Berkshire Hathaway, Sokol has been managing investments through Teton Capital, LLC, his family holding company.

In 2010, Sokol introduced Supreme Court justice Clarence Thomas when the Horatio Alger Association presented Thomas the 1992 Horatio Alger Award. He has had a close personal relationship with Thomas spanning more than a decade and regularly vacations with Thomas and his wife, Ginni.

== Family ==
Sokol and his wife, Peggy, have a daughter, Kelly. Their son, David "DJ" Sokol, died of cancer at age 18.
