= SWALEC =

UK regional electricity supplier

- Type: Subsidiary
- Industry: Energy
- Founded: 14 August 1947
- Defunct: 10 December 1993
- Products: Electricity
- Parent: South Wales Electricity Board

SWALEC was an electricity supply and distribution company in South Wales, established in 1989 following the de-regulation of the electricity supply industry in the United Kingdom. The business has seen several changes of ownership from 1996, and the SWALEC brand has been used for retail gas supply as well as electricity. Today National Grid runs the distribution network business, and SWALEC Contracting is a trading name of OVO Energy. The name SWALEC is a syllabic acronym of 'South Wales Electricity'.

== Predecessor ==
The South Wales Electricity Board (SWaEB) was formed in 1948 under the Electricity Act 1947, which brought about the nationalisation and merger of local authority and private electricity companies.

The SWaEB was responsible for the purchase of electricity from the electricity generator (the Central Electricity Generating Board from 1958) and the distribution and sale of electricity to customers. The key members of the board were: Chairman W. D. D. Fenton (1964, 1967), Deputy Chairman H. Pryce-Jones (1964, 1967), full-time member William E. Richardson (1964, 1967).

The number of customers supplied by the board was:

SWEB customers, 1949–89
Year	1948/9	1960/1	1965/6	1970/1	1975/6	1978/9	1980/1	1985/6	1987/8	1988/9
No. of customers, 1000s	418	653	717	763	805	831	846	878	895	908

Electricity, in GWh, sold by South Wales Electricity Board

=== Existing electricity suppliers taken over at nationalisation ===
The Electricity (Allocation of Undertakings to Area Boards) Order 1948 (SI 1948/484) transferred the electricity business of the following local authorities and private companies to the new board effective 31 March 1948.

==== Local authorities ====
- Aberdare Urban District Council
- Abertillery Urban District Council
- Ammanford Urban District Council
- Barry Corporation
- Bedwas and Machen Urban District Council
- Bedwellty Urban District Council
- Bridgend Urban District Council
- Caerphilly Urban District Council
- Cardiff Corporation
- Cardiff Rural District Council
- Cwmbran Urban District Council
- Ebbw Vale Urban District Council
- Gellygaer Urban District Council
- Llandrindod Wells Urban District Council
- Maesteg Urban District Council
- Milford Haven Urban District Council
- Mountain Ash Urban District Council
- Mynyddislwyn Urban District Council
- Neath Corporation
- Neath Rural District Council
- Newport Corporation
- Ogmore and Gawr Urban District Council
- Penarth Urban District Council
- Penybont Rural District Council
- Pontardawe Rural District Council
- Pontypridd Urban District Council
- Port Talbot Corporation
- Rhondda Urban District Council
- Risca Urban District Council
- Swansea Corporation
- Tredegar Urban District Council

==== Private companies ====
- Aberayron and District Electricity Supply and Power Company
- Carmarthen Electric Supply Company
- Chepstow Electric Lighting and Power Company
- Gorseinon Electric Light Company
- Llanelly and District Electric Supply Company
- Merthyr Electric Traction and Lighting Company
- Monmouth Electricity Company
- Pontypool Electric Light and Power Company
- Porthcawl Electricity Company
- South Wales Electric Power Company
- West Cambrian Power Company

== Formation ==
SWaEB was privatised in 1989 as South Wales Electricity, one of the regional companies created by the Electricity Act 1989. The company soon began to use the SWALEC brand.

== Purchase and breakup ==
The business was bought in 1996 for £872m by newly privatised company Welsh Water, which rebranded itself as Hyder. The business plan was to make significant logistical savings by combining the field activities of electricity and water supply operations by co-locating in fewer offices and operational depots.

In 1997 SWALEC Gas was set up to take advantage of the deregulation of the gas market in the UK which took place in stages from 1997 to 1998. An advertising campaign was launched featuring Wimbledon F.C. and Wales footballer Vinnie Jones.

Hyder encountered financial difficulties and in February 2000 the retail electricity and gas business under the SWALEC brand was sold to British Energy for a reported £105m. The sale included the SWALEC retail brand, whilst Hyder retained the SWALEC electricity distribution business (i.e., running the electricity network) which was renamed Infralec.

In August 2000 Scottish and Southern Energy (SSE) agreed to buy the electricity and gas supply businesses from British Energy for a reported price of £210m. In September 2000, Western Power Distribution bought Hyder for £565 million, sold Welsh Water and renamed Infralec to WPD South Wales.

SSE continued to use the SSE SWALEC brand name for the supply of electricity and gas in Wales. Following the sale of SSE's retail business to OVO Energy in 2020, SWALEC is a trading name of OVO.

From 1992 to 2013 SSE was the sponsor of Wales WRU Challenge Cup, and the SWALEC name was attached to a range of league competitions and trophies administered by the Welsh Rugby Union.
