= Basil Scarsella =

Australian businessman

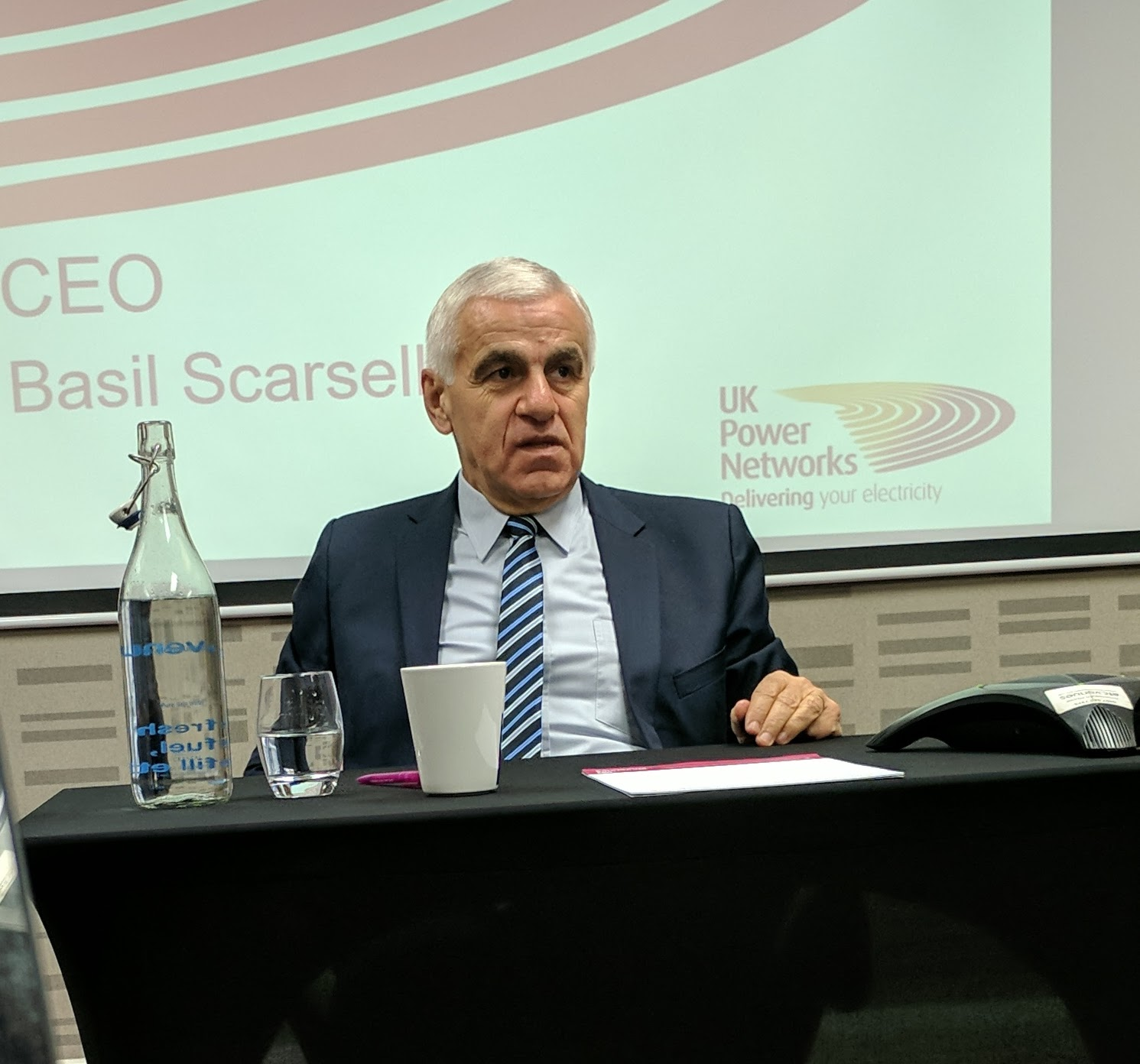

Basil Scarsella is an Italo-Australian businessman. He is a former CEO of ETSA Utilities and Northern Gas Networks. He is the current CEO of UK Power Networks, formerly EDF Energy Networks. He was also president of the Oceania Football Confederation between 2000 and 2003, and is a former member of the executive committee of FIFA.

== Early life ==
Born in September 1955 near Rome, Scarsella moved to Australia from Italy in the early 1960s.

== Working life ==
Scarsella was CEO of ETSA Utilities in Adelaide, South Australia.

Between 2005 and 2011 Scarsella was CEO of Northern Gas Networks, a company that manages the gas distribution network in the north of England.

== Football ==
=== Playing career ===
Scarsella played as a goalkeeper for Campbelltown City.

=== Administration ===
After finishing playing he entered football administration, becoming chairman of Soccer Australia.

Scarsella was president of the Oceania Football Confederation (OFC) in the early 2000s when FIFA promised and subsequently reneged on direct entry for the top OFC team to the World Cup finals tournament. In 2003, he resigned after OFC members passed a vote of no confidence in his leadership.

In 2003 Scarsella became inaugural president of National Soccer League club Adelaide United.

=== Honours ===
- Life member of Campbelltown City SC
- Football Federation Australia - Football Hall of Fame Hall of Honour – Inducted 2001
