= Infralec =

Infralec was a short-lived electricity distribution subsidiary in the United Kingdom. Infralec was established in February 2000 by Hyder to operate the Welsh electricity distribution network previously operated under the SWALEC brand, when the rest of Hyder was sold to British Energy.

In 2001, Hyder was purchased by Western Power Distribution who sold off most parts of the organisation but kept Infralec, which was rebranded as WPD South Wales.
