= Walter Scott Jr. =

American businessman (1931–2021)

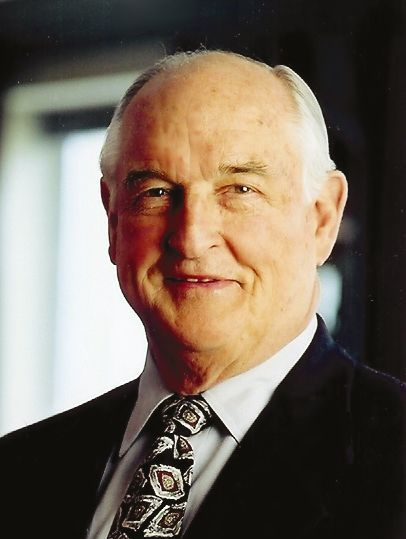
- Born: May 21, 1931; Omaha, Nebraska, US
- Died: September 25, 2021 (aged 90); Omaha, Nebraska, US
- Education: Colorado State University
- Occupations: CEO, Kiewit Corporation
- Spouse(s): Carolyn Jane Falk (m. 1952; died 1983) Suzanne Marshall (m. 1987; died 2013)
- Children: 6

Walter Scott Jr. (May 21, 1931 – September 25, 2021) was an American billionaire businessman, civil engineer, philanthropist, and CEO of Kiewit Corporation. At the time of his death, his net worth was estimated at US$4.2 billion.

== Education ==
He graduated from Colorado State University in 1953 with a bachelor's degree in civil engineering.

== Career ==
Scott was first elected to the Kiewit Corporation board in 1964. In 1979, he was elected president. When Peter Kiewit died later that same year, Scott was selected to succeed him as chairman.

He sat on the board of Berkshire Hathaway, and was a childhood friend of Warren Buffett. He was also on the board of directors of Burlington Resources, Commonwealth Telephone Enterprises, Level 3 Communications Inc., MidAmerican Energy Holdings, RCN Corporation, Valmont Industries, and Peter Kiewit Sons' Inc, and was the chairman of the Open World Leadership Center at the Library of Congress.

He was a director of the Joslyn Art Museum, Nebraska Game and Parks Foundation, and the Omaha Development Foundation. Nationally, he was a director of the Horatio Alger Association and the National Forest Association.

Scott was chairman of Level 3 Communications.

== Philanthropy ==
Scott consistently ranked among the wealthiest Americans. With his wife, Suzanne, he founded the public, non-profit Suzanne and Walter Scott Foundation which has funded the Scott Atrium & Education Center at University of Nebraska Medical Center, the Scott Technology Center in Omaha, and The Summit: Bechtel Family National Scout Reserve.

In June 2010, when Warren Buffett appealed to him to join the Giving Pledge, he partially accepted, stating that after his death his remaining estate will go into his eponymous foundation.

In 2011, he committed $10 million to the construction of Engineering II, a $70 million, 122,000 square feet (11,300 m^{2}) building which will house interdisciplinary energy, environment and health programs at Colorado State University.

In November 2016, it was announced Scott would be donating $53.3 million to Colorado State University School of Engineering, CSU's largest ever gift, and that the College of Engineering at CSU will be renamed the Walter Scott Jr. College of Engineering, becoming the only named college of engineering in the state of Colorado.

== Collector ==
In 1996, Scott acquired the original sales document of the Louisiana Purchase for his private collection.

== Honors and awards ==
Scott became an Eagle Scout in 1946 and was a recipient of the Distinguished Eagle Scout Award.

== Personal life ==
Scott's second wife, Suzanne (née Marshall; 1930-2013) had been a good friend of his late first wife, Carolyn Jane (née Falk; 1932-1983), but did not know Walter. They wed in 1987 at the Countryside Community Church. Suzanne Scott died in 2013, aged 83.

Walter Scott died on September 25, 2021, at the age of 90.
