= Flexible Plug and Play =

Flexible Plug and Play is a research project looking at how to improve the connection of renewable energy generation, like wind farms, to electricity distribution networks in the UK. According to the original submission to Ofgem, the electricity regulator, it will test new technical solutions to problems on the network and develop new commercial arrangements between the energy supplier and network operator.

== Funding ==
The total cost of the project is £9.7 million. In 2011 Ofgem awarded £6.7 million to UK Power Networks from its Low Carbon Network Fund. UK Power Networks is contributing £2 million and the project partners a further £1 million.

== Geographical area of research ==
According to the original bid submission a rural area of around 700km2 between Peterborough, March and Wisbech in Cambridgeshire has been chosen as the test bed for the Flexible Plug and Play project. There are said to be 9 operational wind farms in the area with a total installed capacity of 100MW; a further 10 renewable generation sites have won consent or are at the submission stage, with an additional 10 sites currently subject to scoping studies. This gives a total of a further 188MW of potential wind generation in the same area. However, the progress report of June 2012 says the potential has increased to 200MW. Apparently connecting these extra wind farms to the existing distribution network would be difficult for a number of reasons including voltage constraints, thermal constraints and reverse power flows. It's said that using a traditional approach of network upgrading/reinforcement would be costly and time consuming. As a result the research project will try out new ways of managing the existing network to accommodate this extra power without reinforcing the network.

== Smart devices ==
The Flexible Plug and Play project, according to the submission documents, will test a number of so called smart devices on a distribution network to improve its efficiency and to allow more power to flow through it without reinforcement. 1) Dynamic Line Rating device. The maximum current an overhead power line can carry is an ever changing value affected by the weather. However, in distribution networks the conventional approach is to operate lines with static or seasonal limits. In theory dynamic line rating allows constant monitoring of a line's capacity. Knowing the limits of a section of the network at any moment will help to operate the network at its peak. 2) Automatic Voltage Control. An AVC device monitors voltage levels and automatically adjusts them within pre set limits. In the Flexible Plug and Play project it is envisaged AVCs will be working as part of an Automatic Network Management system. 3) Modern Protection Relay. The existing network uses directional over-current (DOC) protection relays which cannot handle reverse power flows. It's said the modern protection relay will be designed to overcome this problem. It will be tested at the March and Peterborough sub stations. 4) Frequent Use Switches. The distribution network in the test area uses isolator switches at Normally Open Points (NOPs) however, they are not designed for frequent use and have to be reset manually. Frequent Use Switches would be controlled remotely, allowing different network configurations to be used. 5) Quadrature Booster transformer. Quad Boosters are common on transmission networks but not on distribution grids. According to the Flexible Plug and Play progress report dated June 2012 a Quad Booster could be fitted at the British Sugar factory site in Wissington. Apparently the Combined Heat & Power plant operated by British Sugar has seasonal limits on generation export due to the suboptimal loading of the three incoming 33kV circuits. The Quadrature Booster will be connected to one of the circuits to ensure load balancing and it will enable the export of additional generation from the CHP unit onto the electricity grid.

== IEC 61850 Standard ==
IEC 61850 is a standard for the engineering process for the configuration of Intelligent Electronic Devices (IEDs), the structure and naming of their data models and a number of communication mechanisms to support the real time operation of automation systems. The Flexible Plug and Play project plans, it is said, to deploy it on the distribution network in the test area. Silver Spring Networks and Cable and Wireless Worldwide are quoted as being the developing partners.
