= Npower (United Kingdom) =

UK-based energy supplier

npower Business Solutions
- Formerly: National Power PLC; Innogy PLC; RWE Npower; Npower
- Type: Subsidiary
- Industry: Energy to Businesses
- Founded: 2000 (as Innogy plc); 2002 (as RWE Npower); 2016 (as Npower Limited)
- Fate: Merged into E.ON Next
- Successor: E.ON Next
- Headquarters: Swindon, England, United Kingdom
- Products: Gas and electricity
- Number of employees: 5,700
- Parent: E.ON UK
- Website: npowerbusinesssolutions.com

npower Business Solutions is a British supplier of gas and electricity to large businesses. It has been a subsidiary of E.ON UK since January 2019. The company was formerly known as Innogy plc and was listed on the London Stock Exchange and was a constituent of the FTSE 100 Index.

In March 2002, it was acquired by RWE of Germany, and was subsequently renamed RWE npower plc. RWE split off its renewable energy, network and retail divisions as Innogy SE in April 2016, and Npower transferred to the new business. It is considered one of the Big Six energy suppliers, which dominate the gas and electricity market in the United Kingdom.

E.ON transferred npower's residential customers to a new brand, E.ON Next, in 2021. Since then, the npower brand has only been active within the commercial energy space, marketed as npower Business Solutions, a brand of Npower Commercial Gas Limited. The npower Business Solutions brand still supplies over 20,000 businesses, including customers previously supplied by E.ON who have been migrated.

== History ==
The company was established as the consumer division of Innogy plc from the operations of National Power, when the overseas operations were demerged as International Power plc in October 2000.

Innogy plc then went on to purchase the regional electricity company Yorkshire Electricity in February 2001. It later disposed of the distribution side of Yorkshire Electricity to CE Electric UK in exchange for the supply business of Northern Electric. Innogy plc was taken over by the German energy company RWE in March 2002, and renamed RWE Npower plc with all the supply business adopting the "npower" brand.

In February 2006, Npower acquired 19% of Telecom Plus, a business which now provides Npower with management services, such as billing, customer service, metering, debt collection and administration: under the deal Npower can increase its stake in Telecom Plus up to 29%. In February 2009, Npower acquired Superior Plumbing, a business providing services to social housing and business customers across the United Kingdom.

In February 2009, Npower acquired SPI Group to add to its energy services business Npower Hometeam. SPI provides services to the social housing market and its commercial arm serves public buildings, including schools.

In November 2013, however, Npower sold the two former Telecom Plus subsidiaries back to Utility Warehouse for £218 million. As a result, Utility Warehouse became one of the largest independent energy suppliers in the United Kingdom. with over 500,000 customers and 770,000 gas and electricity supply points to their name.

The deal also sparked commentary about the possibility of Npower's parent company RWE leaving the United Kingdom, or the emergence of a "Big Seven" in place of the existing Big Six Energy Suppliers. In March 2016, the company announced losses of £106 million and 2,500 global job cuts, as well as moving over 1,000 back office jobs to India, along with the fact that they had lost 351,000 customers in 2015: a high level of customer complaints were cited as reasons for the issues.

On 1 April 2016, RWE split off its renewable energy, network and retail businesses into the newly formed Innogy SE. Npower became a subsidiary of the new business and was renamed Npower Limited. The coal, natural gas and oil-fired energy power stations, which Npower operated, are no longer part of Npower, but of RWE Generation UK plc.

=== Proposed merger/demerger of retail supply division ===
In November 2017, Innogy and rival SSE announced a planned merger of Npower's residential and business retail business with SSE's residential energy supply and home services business in Great Britain to create a new company listed on the London Stock Exchange. SSE plan to divest its 65.6% holding in the business to its shareholders and Innogy would own the remainder.

The merger received preliminary regulatory clearance from the Competition and Markets Authority on 30 August 2018, and full clearance was given on 10 October 2018. In December 2018, it was announced that the merger would no longer be going ahead, with both companies blaming the recent government price caps, business performance and tough market conditions.

=== Acquisition by E.ON ===
Just after the failed merger of SSE/Npower in December 2018, it was reported that the Big Six energy suppliers would still consolidate to the Big Five, as Npower would be acquired by default by E.ON UK, due to the already planned asset swap of the respective German parents Innogy and E.ON. Npower announced in January 2019 that it would cut nine hundred jobs to save costs because of "an incredibly tough" retail energy market, and a government price cap.

On 29 November 2019 it was announced that over 4,500 jobs would be axed at npower and the brand was to be wound down, with customers being migrated to E.ON UK as part of E.On Next. This ultimately meant the complete closure of npower as an energy company for residential customers.

In 2021, the npower brand can now only be seen in the market trading as npower Business Solutions to over 20,000 businesses across the UK.

== Operations ==
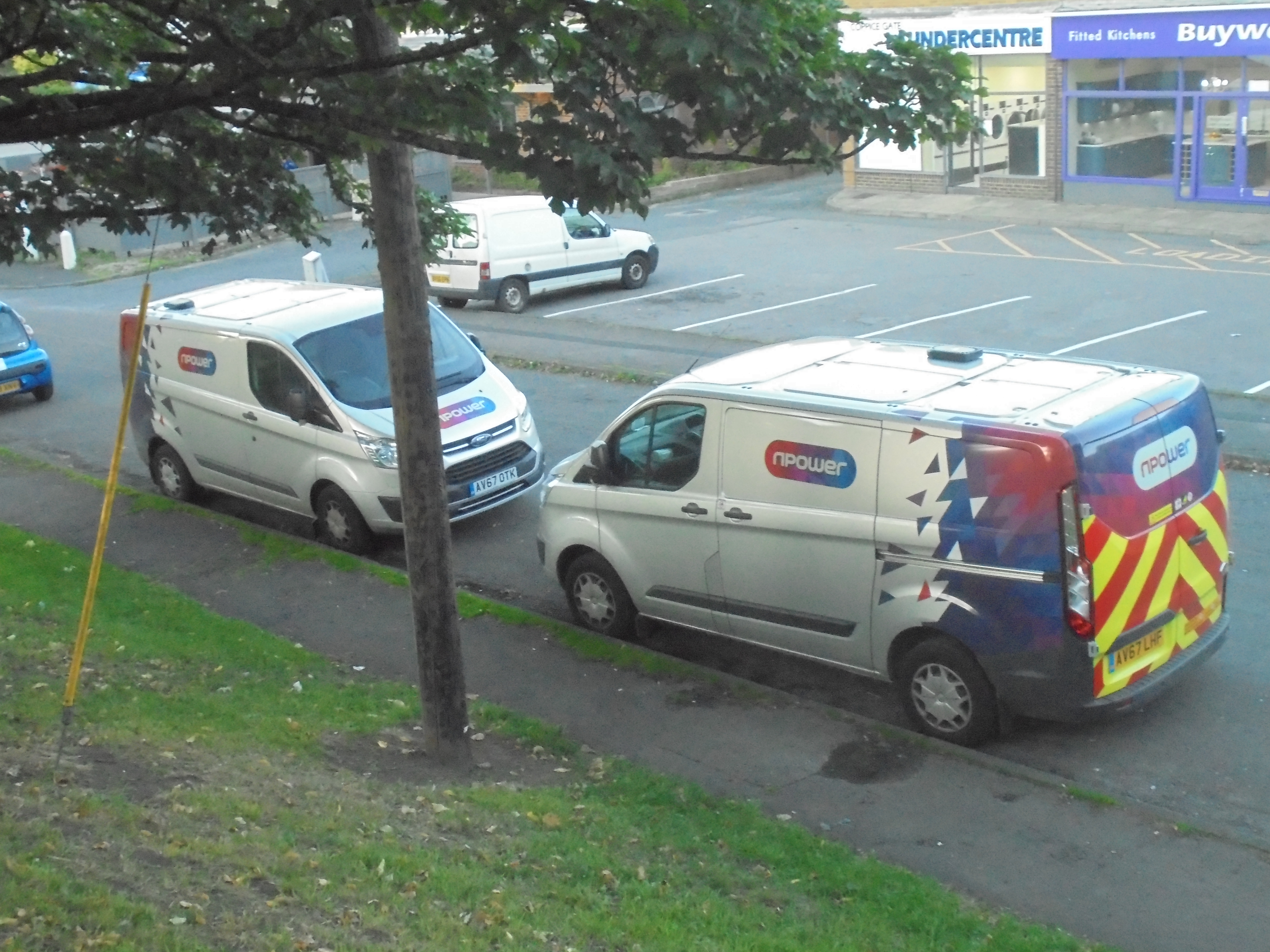
NPower Ford Transit vans in Harrogate, North Yorkshire

As npower, the company used to supply gas and electricity to residential and business customers in the United Kingdom. Its energy services business provided servicing such as repairing boilers and central heating systems through its Hometeam brand.

Now part of the E.ON group, residential and SME customers have been moved over from npower to E.ON Next. For large business customers, however, npower is still trading as npower Business Solutions.

== Criticism ==
In April 2008, Npower faced allegations over the conduct of its door to door salespeople. An undercover investigation by a newspaper resulted in allegations of Npower salespeople misleading potential customers, with suggestions that salespeople were 'routinely lying' and asking potential customers to 'sign a form without revealing it was a contract'.

Npower was eventually fined £1.8 million by the energy regulator Ofgem. Npower have also been criticised for their customer service, having been rated the lowest of all energy suppliers in the Which? Switch 2010 customer satisfaction survey.

In September 2013, Labour Party MPs and campaign group 38 Degrees accused Npower of avoiding tax. Npower defended itself by stating that tax paid had been lower than expected due to higher than expected capital investment in the United Kingdom, leading to capital allowances. A Bloomberg report for Greenpeace confirmed that Npower was the biggest investor in new energy infrastructure recently in the United Kingdom.

However, groups such as 38 Degrees called for customers to boycott or switch over to other providers.

In June 2014, Npower's call centre in Fenton closed, resulting in a loss of 480 jobs following the announcement of the closure the previous December. In December 2015, the company was ordered to pay a £26m settlement by the energy regulator, Ofgem, for "failing to treat customers fairly", the second such fine Ofgem has imposed on it. In November 2019, Npower announced that it will cut up to 4,500 jobs in the United Kingdom, to make the company more profitable.

== See also ==
- Energy policy of the United Kingdom
- Energy use and conservation in the United Kingdom
- Green electricity in the United Kingdom
