= Scottish and Southern Electricity Networks =

Electricity distribution network operator in the UK

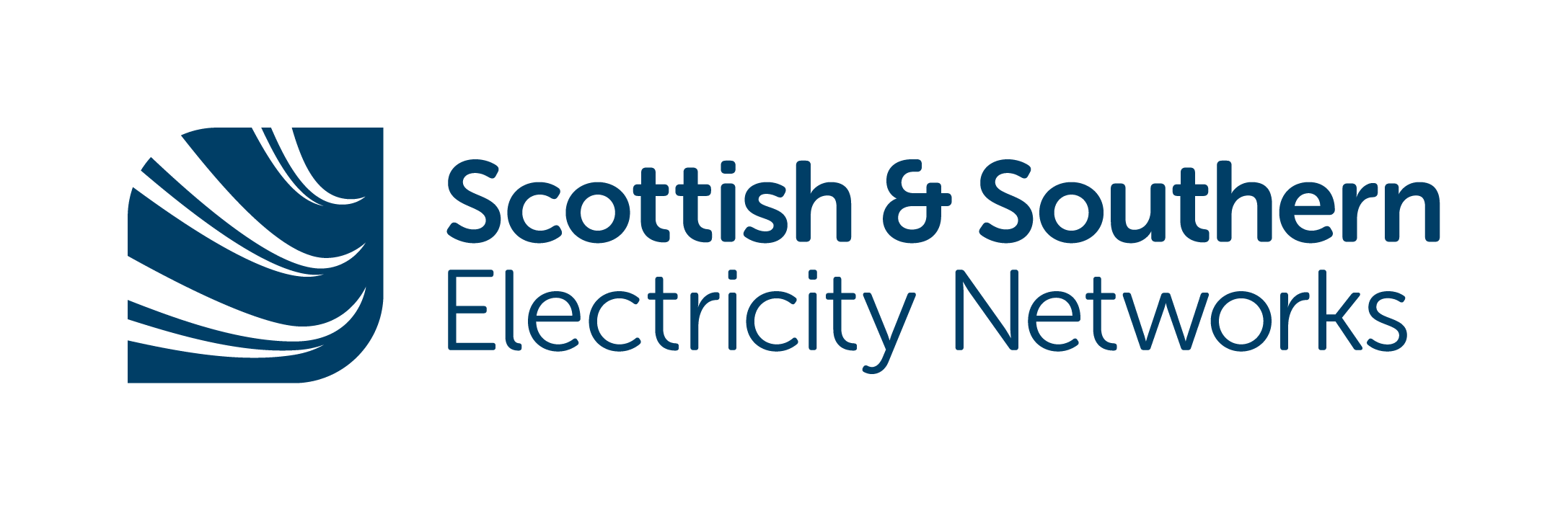
- Trade name: Scottish and Southern Energy Power Distribution Limited; Scottish Hydro Electric Transmission plc Scottish Hydro Electric Power Distribution plc Southern Electric Power Distribution plc
- Company type: Public Limited Company
- Industry: Electricity Distribution and Transmission
- Founded: 2000
- Headquarters: No.1 Forbury Place, 43 Forbury Road, RG1 3JH, Reading, United Kingdom
- Area served: North Scotland (SHEPD); Scotland (SHET); Central Southern England (SEPD)
- Key people: Alistair Phillips-Davies (Chief Executive SSE PLC); Chris Burchell (Managing Director, SSEN Distribution); Rob McDonald (Managing Director, SSEN Transmission)
- Number of employees: 3500
- Parent: SSE plc
- Website: https://www.ssen.co.uk/ (Distribution) https://www.ssen-transmission.co.uk (Transmission)

Scottish and Southern Electricity Networks (SSEN; the trading name of Scottish and Southern Energy Power Distribution Limited, Scottish Hydro Electric Transmission plc, Scottish Hydro Electric Power Distribution plc and Southern Electric Power Distribution plc) is one of two energy companies in the UK to be involved both in electricity transmission and distribution.

The company forms part of the SSE plc group, which is listed on the London Stock Exchange and is a constituent of the FTSE 100 Index.

Scottish and Southern Electricity Networks manages two distribution networks and one transmission network. The company manages two of the fourteen distribution licenses in Great Britain. The company's electricity distribution and transmission networks carry electricity to over 3.9 million homes and businesses across the north of the Central Belt of Scotland, as well as Central Southern England. The company operates in the United Kingdom with head offices in Perth, Scotland and Reading, England.

== History ==
=== Origins ===
The company has its origins in two public sector electricity supply authorities. Scottish Hydroelectric, founded as the North of Scotland Hydro-Electric Board in 1943, was established to design, construct and manage hydroelectricity projects in the Highlands of Scotland, and took over a further generation and distribution responsibilities when the UK's electricity industry was nationalized in 1948. Southern Electric, founded as Southern Electricity Board in 1948, was created to distribute electricity in Southern England. While the Southern Electricity Board was a distribution-only authority with no power generation capacity of its own, the North of Scotland Hydro-Electric Board was a broader spectrum organisation which did have power-generating capabilities. Because of its history and location, the Hydroelectric Board was responsible for most of the UK's hydroelectric generating capacity.

Both authorities were privatized and re-branded in 1990/91, initially retaining their pre-privatization geographic and functional bases.

=== Post-privatization ===
In 1998, Scottish and Southern Energy was formed following a merger between Scottish Hydroelectric and Southern Electric. This part of the SSE plc group is now referred to as Scottish and Southern Electricity Networks.

=== Rebranding ===
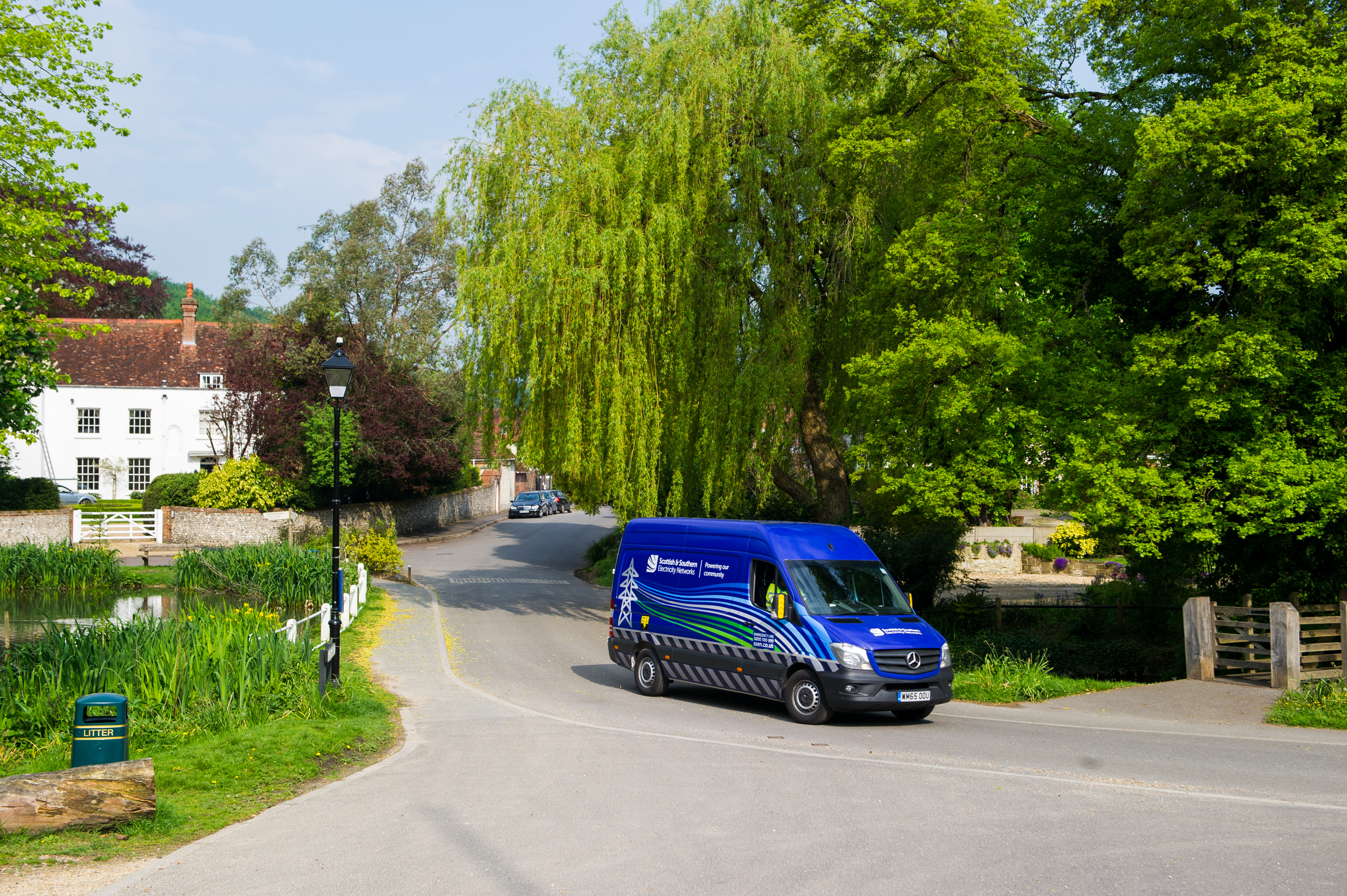
A Scottish and Southern Electricity Networks van, 2016

In September 2016, the well-known trading names of Scottish and Southern Energy Power Distribution (SSEPD), Scottish Hydro Electric Power Distribution (SHEPD), Scottish Hydro Electric Transmission (SHET), and Southern Electric Power Distribution (SEPD), merged into a single trading entity known as the Scottish and Southern Electricity Networks. The licensee names of the four did not change.

As part of the rebranding, Scottish and Southern Electricity Networks changed their logo, colour scheme, imagery set, social media channels, and website. They also introduced a new company motto centred around being a part of the community they serve: "Powering our Community."

=== Partnerships ===
In November 2022, SSE sold a 25% stake in SSEN Transmission (the trading name for Scottish Hydro Electric Transmission) to Ontario Teachers' Pension Plan.

== Operations ==
Scottish and Southern Electricity Networks operate the economically regulated electricity distribution and transmission networks across the north of the Central Belt of Scotland and also Central Southern England, delivering power to 3.9 million homes. With a workforce of over 4,100 working from 85 depots and offices, they look after a network that consists of:

- 130,000 km of overhead lines and underground cables
- 106,000 substations
- Over 100 subsea cables, powering island communities such as Orkney and Hebrides.

=== Scottish and Southern Electricity Networks—Central Southern England ===
The Central Southern England network is the larger of two distribution networks and delivers electrical supplies to over 3.1 million customers across central southern England. The operational region ranges from rural communities in Hampshire, Dorset, Wiltshire, Gloucestershire and Oxfordshire to towns and cities including Bournemouth, Oxford, Portsmouth, Reading, Southampton, Slough, Swindon and in parts of West London. They also distribute electricity to and across the Isle of Wight.

=== Scottish and Southern Electricity Networks—Northern Scotland ===
The Northern Scotland network is the smaller of the two, and delivers electricity to some 740,000 customers. This operating region covers a quarter of the UK landmass, and has challenges both regarding distance and location. As well as the major towns and cities of Aberdeen, Dundee, Inverness and Perth, they connect to most Scottish islands with over 100 subsea cable links, including the Inner and Outer Hebrides, Arran and the Orkney Islands. They also serve the Shetland Islands, which runs as a separate electrical system without a connection to the mainland.

=== Scottish Hydro Electric Transmission (SHE Transmission) ===
Scottish Hydro Electric Transmission owns and maintains the 132 kV, 220 kV, 275 kV and 400 kV electricity transmission network in the north of Scotland, in some of the UK's most challenging geographical terrain. Some of their circuits are over 750 meters above sea level, and some are up to 250 km long.

=== Independent distribution network operator ===
In addition to the distribution network operators who are licensed for a specific geographic area, there are also independent distribution network operators (IDNOs). These own and operate electricity distribution networks which are predominantly network extensions connected to an existing distribution network. Scottish and Southern Electricity Networks provides distribution services in South Scotland, England and Wales as an IDNO.

== Services ==
In the event of a power outage, it is the responsibility of Scottish and Southern Electricity Networks to repair the fault and get power back on for affected areas. Scottish and Southern Electricity Networks also has a Priority Services Register to support customers with disabilities or particular vulnerabilities in the event of a power outage.

Scottish and Southern Electricity Networks has a team dedicated to dealing with non-emergency electricity network jobs in central southern England and northern Scotland. These services range from shrouding overhead power cables to locating underground electricity cables so that they can be worked around safely.

== Controversy ==
Scottish and Southern Electricity Networks are responsible for a controversial plan to expand Scotland’s electrical infrastructure network, with a new network of pylons, substations and associated infrastructure across much of rural Scotland.

== See also ==
- SSE plc
- Office of Gas and Electricity Markets (Ofgem)
