= Hyder (defunct company) =

Defunct Welsh water company

Hyder plc
- Type: Corporation
- Industry: Water, gas and electricity
- Founded: 1996
- Defunct: 2001
- Fate: Insolvency, Broke Up
- Headquarters: Cardiff

Hyder was a Welsh water, gas and electricity multi-utility and infrastructure company created in 1996. It broke up in 2001 following a financial crisis. Created following the takeover of SWALEC by Welsh Water, the company became Wales' largest independent private employer by 1998.

== History ==
Hyder PLC was created in 1996 following the takeover by Welsh Water of the electricity company SWALEC for £872m. By 1998 it was Wales' largest independent private employer, and had quadrupled its turnover since SWALEC was privatised in 1990. (since 1996?).

Hyder owned Swalec and Swalec Gas brands and combined international, leisure, infrastructure and construction interests. Other subsidiary companies/brands of Hyder included Transis (operator of fleet vehicles), Laing Hyder (construction consortium), Hyder Investments, Celtic Infrastructure and Lusis (IT provider), several hotels in Wales, a small stake in cable company NTL and a 36% stake in Severoceske Vodovody a Kanalizace, the Czech water company.

However, the debt taken on to finance the takeover of Swalec left the company vulnerable to external shocks. In these circumstances, the 1998 windfall profits tax on the utilities introduced by the new Labour government, combined with the price cuts required by the 1999 Ofwat price review made Hyder's share price plummet (from a peak of 1048p in January 1998, to a low of 179p in March 2000).

== The sale and break-up of Hyder ==
In February 2000, the retail electricity and gas business under the Swalec brand was sold to British Energy for a reported £105m. The sale included the Swalec retail brand, whilst Hyder retained the Swalec electricity distribution business (i.e. running the electricity network) which was renamed Infralec. The cash boost, however, was not enough to prevent a 30% fall in pre-tax profits, and following the outcome of the unfavourable Ofwat price review, Hyder was vulnerable to a takeover.

Hyder was acquired in September 2000 following a four-month takeover battle won by Western Power Distribution (WPD) - a subsidiary of the US utilities PPL Corporation and Southern Company. Southern Company later sold its interest in WPD to PPL.

Hyder's electricity distribution subsidiary Infralec was rebranded as part of Western Power Distribution.

The water subsidiary, Welsh Water, was sold by WPD to a company limited by guarantee while remaining subsidiaries in areas such as gas and engineering consultancy were sold off by management buy-out or other means, including Hyder Consulting and Hyder Business Services (HBS). Hyder's IT organisation was acquired by Logica in 2001.

Chief executive Graham Hawker went on to run the Welsh Development Agency.

== Name and logo ==
The name Hyder (pronounced [hədɛr]) is the Welsh word for 'Confidence'.

Hyder's name and logo used to be prominent in the seating at Cardiff's Millennium Stadium. Hyder still remains as a brand used by Hyder Consulting. The Hyder logo is also still used by HBS .
