= Electricity billing in the UK =

In the United Kingdom, an electricity supplier is a retailer of electricity. For each supply point the supplier has to pay the various costs of transmission, distribution, meter operation, data collection, tax etc. The supplier then adds in energy costs and the supplier's own charge. Regulation of the charging of customers is covered by the industry regulator Ofgem.

== MSP, GSP and NBP ==
MSP kWh is the amount of electricity consumed at the 'meter supply point', which is the customer's meter. GSP kWh is obtained by multiplying the MSP kWh by the Line Loss Factor (LLF, a figure > 1) to include the amount of electricity lost when it is conducted through the distribution network, from the 'grid supply point' to the customer's meter. Some kWh elements of the bill are charged at MSP and some at GSP. The LLF for a particular supply depends on the distribution network operator (DNO) and the supply's characteristics and the time and date (day of week, season etc.). Some electricity bills may refer to GSP charges as being at a Notional Balancing Point (NBP) - not to be confused with the National Balancing Point (NBP) of the gas network - and may also include losses at transmission level.

== The bill ==
The consumer pays the supplier according to an agreed tariff, or a default rate known as the "standard variable tariff". The tariff may include pass-through costs, which are amounts charged to the energy supplier and then "passed through" directly to the consumer.

=== Transmission charges ===
Transmission charges, known as "Transmission Network Use of System" (TNUoS), are paid to National Grid to cover the expense of running the grid. The charge is calculated annually using the TRIAD method for large levels of demand, or based on usage between 4pm and 7pm for smaller demand levels.

==== RCRC ====
Residual Cashflow Reallocation Cashflow (RCRC), also known as the 'beer fund', is the net remainder of Balancing & Settlement Code (BSC) Trading Charges for a given half-hour, which is payable to (in the case of a surplus) or by (in the case of a deficit) Trading Parties based on their market share of energy volume. These Trading Charges consist of:

- Information Imbalance Charges – A charge per MWh on the difference between a BM Unit's Metered Volume and its Expected Metered Volume (based on Final Physical Notification plus Balancing Services Volume). Due to a zero price, this charge is always zero
- System Operator BM Cashflow – A cashflow payable to or by the System Operator depending on whether BM Unit Cashflow plus Non-Delivery Charges is positive or negative, and is intended to keep BSCCo cash neutral
- Non-Delivery Charges – A charge levied on the Lead Parties of BM Units that fail to satisfy a Bid-Offer Acceptance on the Balancing Mechanism
- BM Unit Cashflow – A cashflow payable to or by Lead Parties of BM Units with Bid-Offer Acceptances
- Imbalance Charges – A cashflow payable to or by Trading Parties with an Imbalance Volume

As Information Imbalance Charges are always zero, and System Operator BM Cashflow nets with Non-Delivery Charges and BM Unit Cashflow to zero, RCRC is effectively the net of Imbalance Cashflows.

=== Distribution charges ===
The distribution charges, known as the "distribution use of system" (DUoS) charges, are paid to suppliers and passed on to the distribution network operator (DNO) on whose network the meter point is located. The charges cover:

==== Availability ====
Supply availability, otherwise known as "supply capacity" or "kVA", if represented by its measured units, is the maximum kVA power allowed for a particular supply in a particular network and is set before the supply is energised. It is a figure agreed between the consumer and the supplier (set to a level required by the consumer in almost all cases except where power distribution may be physically limited to the supply) at the start of the contract. This supply availability is charged for every month, in effect as a standing charge, despite the fact that the maximum demand recorded in the month may be lower. If the kVA supply availability figure is exceeded (breached, in effect) by the value of the measured monthly maximum demand, also in kVA for this purpose, the higher figure of kVA from the maximum demand may be charged instead of the supply capacity. The new elevated kVA charge figure (or the supplier's nearest higher capacity band figure, if capacity is only allowed in banded levels 50 kVA apart for instance) may stay as the chargeable figure for twelve months depending on the electricity distribution area. This can cause temporary unnecessary high billing, as if a penalty, if the breach was avoidable. Alternatively, the capacity charge can just return to the original availability figure in the subsequent month's bill. Determining the correct capacity figure to allow for the maximum demand required for the supply can be a fine judgement if the capacity charge is to be kept to a minimum, and vigilance of maximum demand and efforts to keep the power demand lower than the agreed capacity can be required to avoid triggering a higher capacity charge during the contract.

==== Unit rates ====
Unit rates are split into 3 time periods: Red, Amber and Green. Costs and periods vary per distribution company. The chart below shows the applicable time bands for each company.

DNO (with 4-character BSC identifier[s])	Band	Weekday	Weekend
National Grid Electricity Distribution – Midlands (EMEB & MIDE)	Red	16:00 – 19:00	
National Grid Electricity Distribution – Midlands (EMEB & MIDE)	Amber	07:30 – 16:00 & 19:00 – 21:00	
National Grid Electricity Distribution – Midlands (EMEB & MIDE)	Green	00:00 – 07:30 & 21:00 – 24:00	all day
National Grid Electricity Distribution – South Wales (SWAE)	Red	17:00 – 19:30	
National Grid Electricity Distribution – South Wales (SWAE)	Amber	07:30 – 17:00 & 19:30 – 22:00	12:00 – 13:00 & 16:00 – 21:00
National Grid Electricity Distribution – South Wales (SWAE)	Green	00:00 – 07:30 & 22:00 – 24:00	00:00 – 12:00 & 13:00 – 16:00 & 21:00 – 24:00
National Grid Electricity Distribution - South West (SWEB)	Red	17:00 – 19:00	
National Grid Electricity Distribution - South West (SWEB)	Amber	07:30 – 17:00 & 19:00 – 21:30	16:30 – 19:30
National Grid Electricity Distribution - South West (SWEB)	Green	00:00 – 7:30 & 21:30 – 24:00	00:00 – 16:30 & 19:30 – 24:00
Northern Powergrid - Northeast & Yorkshire (NEEB & YELG)	Red	16:00 – 19:30	
Northern Powergrid - Northeast & Yorkshire (NEEB & YELG)	Amber	08:00 – 16:00 & 19:30 – 22:00	
Northern Powergrid - Northeast & Yorkshire (NEEB & YELG)	Green	00:00 – 08:00 & 22:00 – 24:00	all day
UK Power Networks - London (LOND)	Red	11:00 – 14:00 & 16:00 – 19:00	
UK Power Networks - London (LOND)	Amber	07:00 – 11:00 & 14:00 – 16:00 & 19:00 – 23:00	
UK Power Networks - London (LOND)	Green	00:00 – 07:00 & 23:00 – 24:00	all day
UK Power Networks - Eastern and South Eastern (EELC & SEEB)	Red	16:00 – 19:00	
UK Power Networks - Eastern and South Eastern (EELC & SEEB)	Amber	07:00 – 16:00 & 19:00 – 23:00	
UK Power Networks - Eastern and South Eastern (EELC & SEEB)	Green	00:00 – 07:00 & 23:00 – 24:00	all day
Electricity North West (NORW)	Red	16:00 – 19:00	
Electricity North West (NORW)	Amber	09:00 – 16:00 & 19:00 – 20:30	16:00 – 19:00
Electricity North West (NORW)	Green	00:00 – 09:00 & 20:30 – 24:00	00:00 – 16:00 & 19:00 – 24:00
Scottish and Southern Electricity Networks - Scottish Hydro (HYDE)	Red	16:00 – 19:00	
Scottish and Southern Electricity Networks - Scottish Hydro (HYDE)	Amber	07:00 – 16:00 & 19:00 – 21:00	12:00 – 20:00
Scottish and Southern Electricity Networks - Scottish Hydro (HYDE)	Green	00:00 – 07:00 & 21:00 – 24:00	00:00 – 12:00 & 20:00 – 24:00
Scottish and Southern Electricity Networks - Southern Electric (SOUT)	Red	16:30 – 19:30	
Scottish and Southern Electricity Networks - Southern Electric (SOUT)	Amber	07:00 – 16:30 & 19:30 – 22:00	09:30 - 21:30
Scottish and Southern Electricity Networks - Southern Electric (SOUT)	Green	00:00 – 07:00 & 22:00 – 24:00	00:00 - 09:30 & 21:30 - 24:00
SP Energy Networks - Manweb and ScottishPower (MANW & SPOW)	Red	16:30 – 19:30	
SP Energy Networks - Manweb and ScottishPower (MANW & SPOW)	Amber	08:00 – 16:30 & 19:30 – 22:30	16:00 – 20:00
SP Energy Networks - Manweb and ScottishPower (MANW & SPOW)	Green	00:00 – 08:00 & 22:30 – 24:00	00:00 – 16:00 & 20:00 – 24:00

==== Reactive power ====
Reactive power charges are applied to non-domestic electricity connections with half-hourly meters when the power factor falls below 0.95. Charges are based on the volume of excess reactive energy (kVArh) consumed below this threshold.

==== Fixed charge ====
The fixed charge is in units of pence / MPAN / day.

New DUoS charges came into effect on 1 April 2018 under a proposal known as DCP228. Green and amber rates were raised and red rates fell. Further changes came into effect in 2025, with:

- increases in capacity charges
- reductions in daily charges
- higher unit rates.

=== Climate Change Levy ===
The Climate Change Levy is a p/kWh tax on certain electricity use. Exempt supplies include domestic supplies and supplies using less than the de minimis threshold of 1,000 kWh / month.

=== Renewables Obligation ===
Suppliers meet the Renewables Obligation by submitting a certain number of Renewable Obligation certificates (ROCs) each year to Ofgem, which demonstrates that the certified electricity has come from a renewable source. If a supplier is unable to produce the required number of ROCs, they must pay an equivalent cash amount, the 'cash out price'.

=== Energy charge ===
Energy charges are the cost per kWh (kilowatt hour). They are usually given as pence per kWh (p/kWh), an amount often referred to as the unit price or unit rate. The cost of the electricity (without surcharges) is occasionally negative during low consumption and high winds, starting in 2019.

=== Data collection charge ===
The data collection charge is a fee paid to the data collector for determining the energy consumption of the supply.

=== Meter operation charge ===
The meter operation charge is a fee paid to the meter operator for installing and maintaining the meter.

=== VAT ===
VAT is payable at the standard rate unless the supply meets certain conditions (e.g. domestic supplies, or supplies that use less than 1,000 kWh per month) in which case they are charged at the reduced rate of 5%.

== Changing supplier ==
For a non-half-hourly supply, the NHHDC sets the change of supplier (CoS) read from a meter read, a customer read or a deemed read. A deemed read is one estimated by the NHHDC based on any previous or subsequent readings. A CoS read can be disputed up to final reconciliation. Final reconciliation is fourteen months afterwards. If a normal read comes in after final reconciliation that is lower than the CoS read, the new supplier should credit the customer.

== See also ==
- Energy in the United Kingdom
- Energy law
- Energy use and conservation in the United Kingdom
