= Western Power Distribution =

Brand used by British electricity distribution companies

- Company type: Subsidiary
- Industry: Electricity
- Founded: 1999
- Defunct: 2022
- Fate: absorbed into National Grid
- Headquarters: Bristol, England, United Kingdom
- Area served: Wales & South West, East Midlands & West Midlands
- Products: Electric power distribution
- Parent: PPL Corporation
- Website: www.nationalgrid.co.uk

Western Power Distribution is a trade name formerly used by four electricity distribution companies in the United Kingdom: WPD South West (operating in South West England), WPD South Wales (in South Wales) and WPD Midlands (two companies, in the East Midlands and West Midlands). Each company was the distribution network operator for its respective region. Western Power Distribution, which had headquarters in Bristol, served approximately 7.7 million customers in its combined distribution areas. In 2022 the company was absorbed into its new parent company, National Grid.

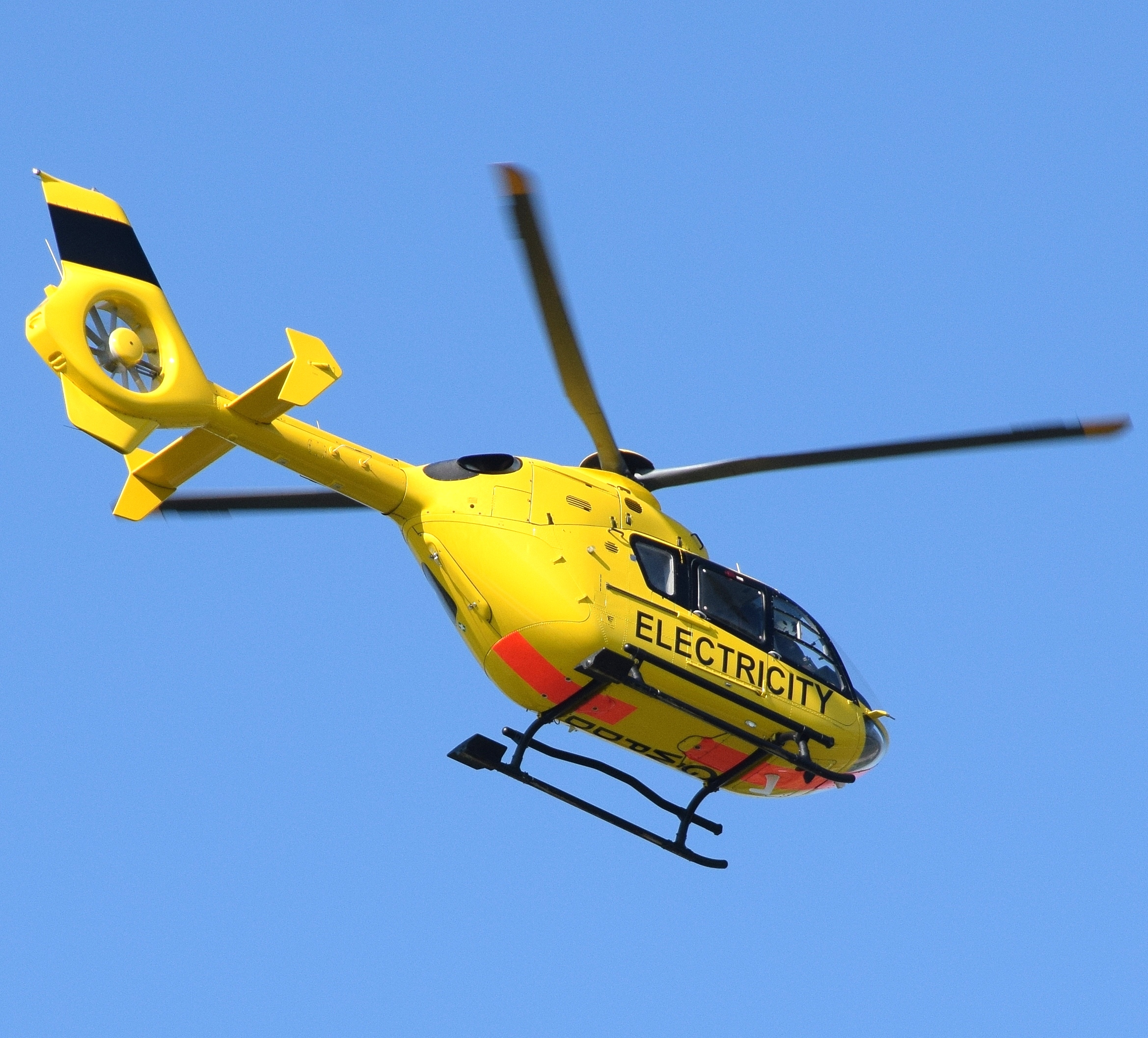
Eurocopter EC135P1 of Western Power Distribution, used for line inspections (2016)

== History ==
=== Formation ===
In 1998, WPD South West was formed from the demerger of the electricity distribution arm of SWEB. In September 2000, the American energy company PPL Corporation purchased Hyder for £565m and sold Welsh Water and other interests, leaving the electricity distribution arm Infralec which was renamed WPD South Wales. In April 2011, PPL purchased Central Networks (the distribution network operator for the East and West Midlands) from E.ON for £3.5 billion and rebranded it as WPD Midlands.

=== 2022 redress payment ===
In May 2022, WPD made a £14.9 million voluntary redress payment after an investigation by industry regulator Ofgem found shortfalls in the company's implementation of its obligations to vulnerable customers.

=== Acquisition by National Grid ===
Western Power Distribution was a subsidiary of PPL for many years. In August 2020, PPL announced an intention to sell WPD. In March 2021, PPL announced a swap with National Grid in which it divested WPD and acquired Narragansett Electric of Rhode Island. The acquisition was completed in June 2021, and approved by the Competition and Markets Authority in September of that year. In September 2022, the company was renamed to National Grid Electricity Distribution.
