= UK Power Networks =

Electricity network operator in parts of England

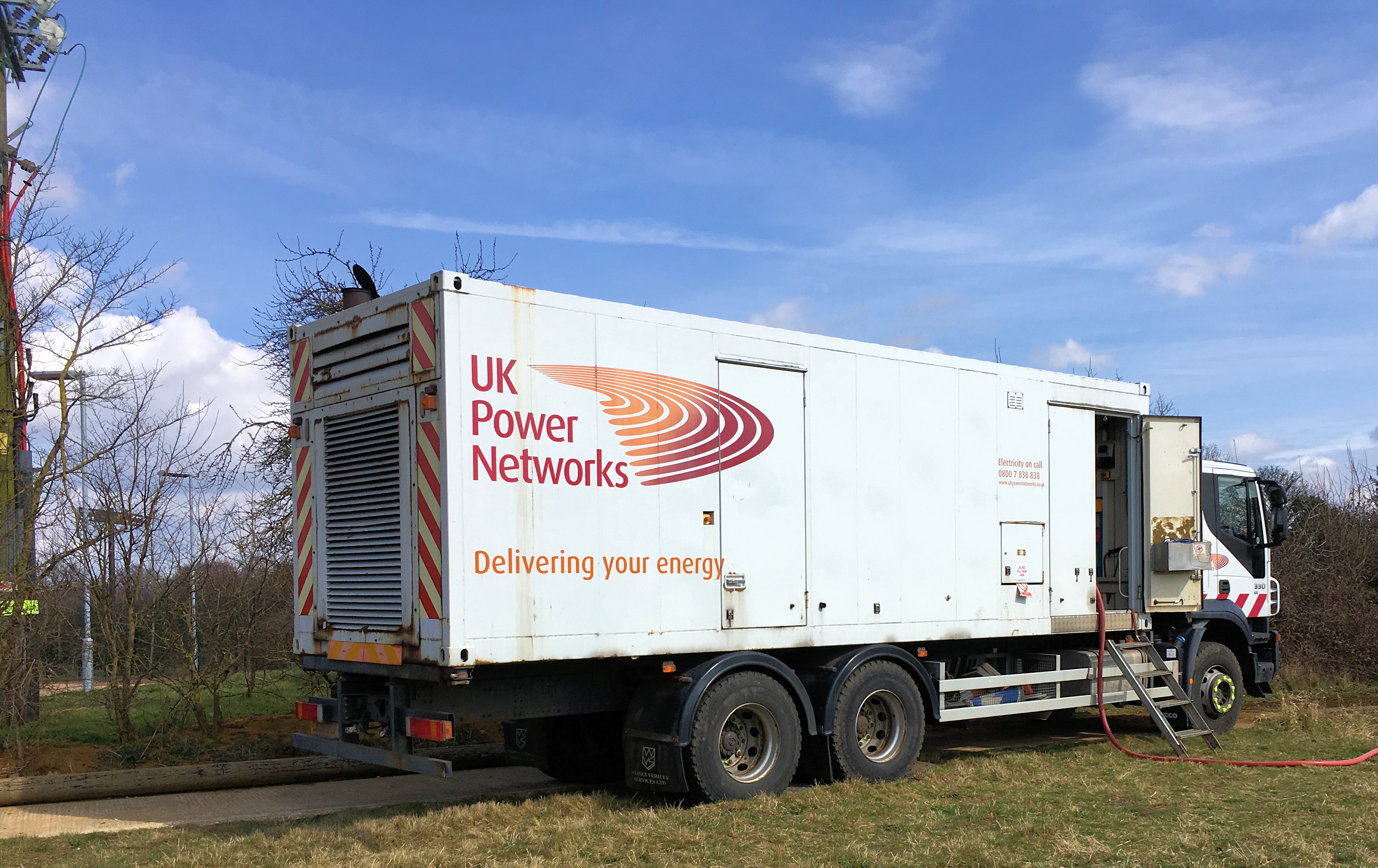
- Company type: Subsidiary
- Industry: Energy
- Founded: 2010 with Founding CEO David Owens
- Headquarters: London, England, UK
- Key people: Basil Scarsella (CEO)
- Products: Electricity
- Revenue: ▲£ 1,760 million (March 2021)
- Operating income: ▲£ 614.8 million (March 2021)
- Owner: Engie (100%)
- Website: www.ukpowernetworks.co.uk

UK Power Networks (UKPN) is a distribution network operator for electricity covering South East England, the East of England and London. It manages three licensed distribution networks (Eastern Power Networks, South Eastern Power Networks and London Power Networks) which together cover an area of 30000 square kilometres and approximately eight million customers.

As well as the three distribution arms, UK Power Networks also operates UK Power Networks Services Holdings Limited, which develops and maintains electrical networks for customers including London Underground, Heathrow and Stansted airports, Docklands Light Railway and Canary Wharf. UK Power Networks maintains the electricity networks including the lines and electricity cables. There are 14 distribution network operators (DNOs), each responsible for a different area of the country. These DNOs are all regulated by Ofgem.

== History ==
The area originally comprised three networks: the London Electricity Board, the Eastern Electricity Board and the South Eastern Electricity Board, known as SEEBOARD, before being brought together by EDF Energy to form EDF Energy Networks. UK Power Networks began operations in October 2010 after the sale of EDF Energy Networks to the Cheung Kong Group for a reported £5.5 billion.

In 2011 UK Power Networks was awarded £6.7 million by Ofgem for its Flexible Plug and Play project, in which it was researching new ways, technical and commercial, to connect renewable energy to the distribution network in Cambridgeshire. It was awarded £25 million in 2014 from Ofgem's Low Carbon Networks Fund for the Low Carbon London project.

== Ownership ==
UK Power Networks was owned by Cheung Kong Infrastructure Holdings (CKI) (40%), Power Assets Holdings (40%), and The Li Ka Shing Foundation (20%) from November 2010 up until May 7th 2026, when CKI reached an agreement with Engie to purchase UKPN for £10.5 billion, a deal which was announced in February 2026.

== Open Data Portal ==
UK Power Networks operate an Open Data Portal with material released under either Creative Commons Attribution 4.0 International (CC BY 4.0) licensing or alternatively UK Open Government 3.0 (OGL UK 3.0) licensing where necessary.

== See also ==
- History of EDF Energy Networks
