= Berkshire Hathaway Energy =

American energy holding company

Berkshire Hathaway Energy Company
- The BHE logo used since 2014
- Formerly: California Energy Company, Inc. (1971-1992); CalEnergy Company, Inc. (1992-1999); MidAmerican Energy Holdings Company (1999-2014)
- Type: Subsidiary
- Industry: Electricity; Natural gas
- Founded: 1971; 55 years ago
- Headquarters: Des Moines, Iowa, U.S.
- Area served: United States; United Kingdom; Canada
- Key people: Greg Abel (chairman); Scott W. Thon (president & CEO); Charles C. Chang (Senior Vice President & CFO)
- Revenue: ▲US$26.198 billion (2025)
- Operating income: ▲US$4.845 billion (2025)
- Net income: ▲US$4.214 billion (2025)
- Total assets: ▲US$148.327 billion (2025)
- Total equity: ▲US$55.309 billion (2025)
- Number of employees: 23,900 (2025)
- Parent: Berkshire Hathaway
- Subsidiaries: MidAmerican Energy Company; NV Energy; PacifiCorp; Northern Powergrid
- Website: brkenergy.com

Berkshire Hathaway Energy (BHE) is an American energy holding company and a wholly owned subsidiary of Berkshire Hathaway. The company is headquartered in Des Moines, Iowa. BHE owns and operates a diverse portfolio of utility and energy businesses, providing electricity and natural gas to more than 5 million customers across the United States, the United Kingdom, and Canada. Its subsidiaries include MidAmerican Energy Company, NV Energy, PacifiCorp, and Northern Powergrid, among others, serving regions ranging from the Western and Midwestern U.S. to parts of the U.K. through regulated utility operations and renewable energy initiatives.

BHE serves approximately 5.3 million retail customers and has a generating capacity of 29 gigawatts. The company transports 8.2 billion cubic feet of natural gas per day and owns five U.S. interstate natural gas pipeline companies, which operate 21,000 miles of pipeline with a combined design capacity of 21 billion cubic feet of natural gas per day. It is also exploring the production of lithium carbonate and other minerals from its 350-megawatt geothermal power plants located in Lithium Valley near the Salton Sea in California.

== History ==
On October 24, 1999, BHE executed an Agreement and Plan of Merger with an investor consortium led by Berkshire Hathaway and comprising Walter Scott, Jr., David L. Sokol, and Gregory E. Abel. The agreement provided for the acquisition of all outstanding common shares of company at $35.05 per share, representing a 29% premium over the previous closing price. The total equity value of the transaction, inclusive of transaction costs, was approximately $2.2 billion. Berkshire Hathaway committed $1.24 billion to acquire common and convertible preferred stock and $455 million to purchase nontransferable trust preferred securities bearing an 11% coupon and maturing on March 14, 2010. Scott, Sokol, and Abel collectively contributed $310 million in cash and securities. The remaining funding was sourced from company's existing cash reserves. The transaction also included the assumption of $7 billion in outstanding debt. Following completion, voting ownership was allocated as follows: Berkshire Hathaway held a 9.7% stake, Scott held 86%, Sokol held 3%, and Abel held 1%. The merger resulted in company becoming a privately held company. Existing management and operational structures were retained.

On May 24, 2005, BHE agreed to acquire PacifiCorp from ScottishPower for $5.1 billion in cash, plus $4.3 billion in assumed debt and preferred stock. ScottishPower had purchased PacifiCorp in 1999 for approximately $10 billion. Under ScottishPower's ownership, PacifiCorp failed to achieve projected revenue growth and reported earnings below expectations, disappointing investors. In November 2004, ScottishPower initiated a review of PacifiCorp, which contributed about half of the parent company's earnings. Following an assessment of capital requirements and regulatory developments, ScottishPower determined divestiture was appropriate.

On March 18, 2006, BHE announced that it had received final regulatory approval to complete its acquisition of PacifiCorp, with the transaction expected to close by March 22. Regulatory approvals were obtained from the six state public utility commissions overseeing PacifiCorp’s service territories, as well as from the Federal Energy Regulatory Commission, the Nuclear Regulatory Commission, and the U.S. Department of Justice. BHE stated that the regulatory process was completed within ten months of the announcement. BHE also committed to invest approximately $1 billion annually for at least five years to upgrade PacifiCorp’s electricity infrastructure, including transmission systems and emissions reductions at coal-fired plants.

On March 21, 2006, BHE finalized the acquisition of all outstanding common stock of PacifiCorp from PHI, a subsidiary of Scottish Power. This transaction was executed under the terms of a Stock Purchase Agreement dated May 23, 2005, among BHE, ScottishPower, and PHI, as amended on March 21, 2006. The cash purchase price totaled $5,109,500,000. Following the acquisition, BHE held control of approximately 99.76% of PacifiCorp's voting securities, inclusive of preferred stock. Funding for the purchase was derived from BHE's sale of $5.07 billion in BHE common stock to Berkshire Hathaway and $35.5 million in the same stock to other BHE shareholders.

David L. Sokol was CEO until early 2008. He left Berkshire in 2011 after he personally made a $3 million profit from Berkshire Hathaway's purchase of Lubrizol.

On April 30, 2014, MidAmerican Energy Holdings Company announced it had changed its name to Berkshire Hathaway Energy, a subsidiary of Berkshire Hathaway. Greg Abel, the company’s chief executive, stated that the new name reflected the benefits of Berkshire Hathaway’s ownership—particularly the ability to reinvest in businesses and maintain a long-term perspective on customer needs. This change aligned with a broader trend among Berkshire Hathaway subsidiaries of adopting the parent company’s name to leverage its greater brand recognition compared to “MidAmerican.” Subsidiaries such as PacifiCorp and NV Energy retained their existing names and local management structures. The company reported $1.64 billion in profit on $12.74 billion in revenue for 2013, contributing nearly 8% to Berkshire Hathaway’s overall profit that year. Berkshire Hathaway held an 89.8% stake in the company, having initially acquired 76% in 2000. At the time, the company held approximately $70 billion in assets and served 8.4 million customers.

In August 2022, Berkshire Hathaway acquired a 1% stake in the company from Greg Abel for $870 million.

In October 2024, Berkshire Hathaway purchased the remaining 8% stake from the family of Walter Scott Jr. following his death three years prior, bringing the company's ownership to 100%.

== Subsidiaries ==
BHE owns the following companies:

- MidAmerican Funding, LLC
  - MHC Inc.
    - MidAmerican Energy Company
    - Midwest Capital Group, Inc.
- PPW Holdings LLC
  - PacifiCorp
- Northern Powergrid Holdings Company (formerly CE Electric UK)
  - Northern Powergrid (Yorkshire) plc
  - Northern Powergrid (Northeast) plc
  - Integrated Utility Services UK
  - CalEnergy Resources Ltd.
- BHE Renewables
  - Imperial Valley Geothermal Project
- BHE Pipeline Group
  - Kern River Gas Transmission Company and Kern River Pipeline - acquired in 2006 for $960 million.
  - Northern Natural Gas Company (Omaha) - acquired from Dynegy in 2002 for $928 million.
  - BHE Gas Transmissions & Storage - acquired from Dominion Energy in 2020 for $9.7 billion.
- NV Energy - electricity and natural gas in most of Nevada
- Metalogic Inspections Services - Oil and Gas, Electricity generation, Fabrication, Pipeline, Services - acquired in 2013 for $5.4 billion.
- Intelligent Energy Solutions - Heat pumps, solar panels, and biomass heating systems
- AltaLink - Acquired for C$3.24 billion in 2014.
- HomeServices of America

In August 2017, BHE's proposed acquisition of Oncor Electric Delivery was terminated after BHE was outbid by Sempra.

== Environmental issues ==
Through 2023, the company has invested $34.1 billion in renewable energy projects and has ceased coal operations at 18 coal-fired power stations. The company plans to cease coal operations at 15 more stations between 2025 and 2030.

A 2025 Reuters investigation reported that Berkshire Hathaway Energy operates several of the most polluting coal-fired power plants in the United States. Despite investments in renewable energy, the company was criticized for its decision to operate these plants until at least 2049, raising public health and environmental concerns.
