= Distribution network operator =

Operator of the electric power distribution system

A distribution network operator (DNO), also known as a distribution system operator (DSO), is the operator of the electric power distribution system which delivers electricity to most end users. Each country may have many local distribution network operators, which are separate from the transmission system operator (responsible for transporting power in bulk around the country).

== France ==
In France, Enedis, a subsidiary of EDF, distributes approximately 95% of electricity, with the remaining 5% distributed by 160 local electricity and gas distribution companies (entreprises locales de distribution d'électricité et de gaz or ELD).

== Great Britain ==
In Great Britain, distribution network operators are licensed by the Office of Gas and Electricity Markets.

There are fourteen licensed geographically defined areas, based on the former area electricity board boundaries, where the distribution network operator distributes electricity from the transmission grid to homes and businesses. Under the Utilities Act 2000 they are prevented from supplying electricity; this is done by a separate electricity supply company, chosen by the consumer, who makes use of the distribution network.

Distribution network operators are also responsible for allocating the core Meter Point Administration Number used to identify individual supply points in their respective areas, as well as operating and administering a Meter Point Administration System that manages the details relating to each supply point. These systems then populate ECOES (Electricity Central Online Enquiry Service), the central online database of electricity supply points. Their trade association is the Energy Networks Association.

=== History ===
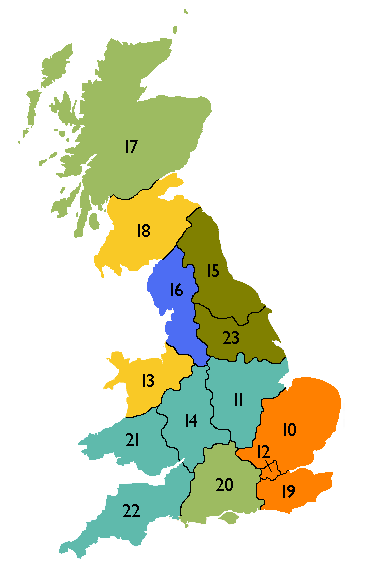
Map of DNO licence areas, coloured by company group (situation as of 2010)

In 1990, the area boards were replaced by regional electricity companies, which were then privatised. The distribution network operators are the successors to the distribution arms of the regional electricity companies. The distribution network operators have a trade association called the Energy Networks Association.

As of October 2022, six company groups hold the fourteen distribution licences:

GSP Group ID	Area ID	TLF Zone	Area	DNO company	Group	Former area electricity board	MPAS Operator ID
_A	10	1	East England	Eastern Power Networks plc	UK Power Networks	Eastern Electricity	EELC
_B	11	2	East Midlands	National Grid Electricity Distribution (East Midlands) plc	National Grid Electricity Distribution	East Midlands Electricity	EMEB
_C	12	3	London	London Power Networks plc	UK Power Networks	London Electricity Board	LOND
_D	13	4	North Wales, Merseyside and Cheshire	SP Manweb plc	SP Energy Networks	MANWEB	MANW
_E	14	5	West Midlands	National Grid Electricity Distribution (West Midlands) plc	National Grid Electricity Distribution	Midlands Electricity	MIDE
_F	15	6	North East England	Northern Powergrid (Northeast) plc	Northern Powergrid	North Eastern Electricity Board	NEEB
_G	16	7	North West England	Electricity North West Limited	Electricity North West	NORWEB	NORW
_P	17	14	North Scotland	Scottish Hydro-Electric Power Distribution plc	Scottish and Southern Electricity Networks	North of Scotland Hydro-Electric Board	HYDE
_N	18	13	South and Central Scotland	SP Distribution plc	SP Energy Networks	South of Scotland Electricity Board	SPOW
_J	19	9	South East England	South Eastern Power Networks plc	UK Power Networks	Seeboard	SEEB
_H	20	8	Southern England	Southern Electric Power Distribution plc	Scottish and Southern Electricity Networks	Southern Electric	SOUT
_K	21	10	South Wales	National Grid Electricity Distribution (South Wales) plc	National Grid Electricity Distribution	SWALEC	SWAE
_L	22	11	South West England	National Grid Electricity Distribution (South West) plc	National Grid Electricity Distribution	SWEB	SWEB
_M	23	12	Yorkshire	Northern Powergrid (Yorkshire) plc	Northern Powergrid	Yorkshire Electricity	YELG

=== IDNOs ===
In addition to the distribution network operators noted above who are licensed for a specific geographic area there are also independent distribution network operators (IDNO). IDNOs own and operate electricity distribution networks which will predominantly be network extensions connected to the existing distribution network, e.g. to serve new housing developments.

Area ID	Name	Licensee	MPAS Operator ID
24	Envoy	Independent Power Networks	IPNL
25	ESP Electricity	ESP Electricity	LENG
26	Last Mile Electricity	Last Mile Electricity	GUCL
27	GTC	The Electricity Network Company Ltd	ETCL
28	EDF IDNO	UK Power Networks (IDNO) Ltd	EDFI
29	Harlaxton Energy Networks Ltd	Harlaxton (IDNO)	HARL
30	Leep Electricity Networks Ltd	Leep Electricity Networks (IDNO)	PENL
31	UK Power Distribution Ltd	UK Power Distribution Ltd	UKPD
32	Energy Assets Networks Ltd	Energy Assets Networks Ltd.	UDNL
33	Eclipse Power Networks	Eclipse Power Networks	GGEN
34	mua Electricity Ltd	mua Electricity Ltd	MPDL
35	Fulcrum Electricity Assets	Fulcrum Electricity Assets	FEAL
36	Vattenfall Networks Ltd	Vattenfall Networks Ltd	VATT
37	Optimal Power Networks	Optimal Power Networks	FORB
38	Indigo Power Limited	Indigo Power Limited	INDI
39	Squire Energy Metering Ltd	Squire Energy Metering Ltd	STRK
40	Utility Assets Limited	Utility Assets Limited	UTAL
42	Advanced Electricity Networks	Advanced Electricity Networks	AENL
43	IDCS Ltd	IDCS Ltd	IDCS

=== Building network operators ===
A further, smaller level of distribution is the building network operator (BNO), usually a company employed by the building owner, in a large building with many meters, such as a block of private flats.

In this case, the DNO may act as BNO and its responsibility may include the sub-mains to the individual flats, or DNO responsibility may end at the first incomer, in which case the independent BNO is responsible for the secure distribution cabling 'laterals' between that point and the individual fuses and meters.

Historically such cabling would have been maintained and sealed by electricity boards that preceded the DNOs, and different DNOs supplying buildings of different sizes and conditions, may choose to adopt the wiring in the building or to insist that an independent BNO is appointed. Unlike a DNO or an IDNO, BNOs may be exempted from any licensing requirement by schedules 2 and 3 of The Electricity (Class Exemptions from the Requirement for a Licence) Order 2001 and this allows those responsible for the building network (such as a housing association) to employ any suitable electrical contractor on an ad-hoc basis.

== Canada ==
In Canada, the distribution network operators are known as local distribution companies (LDC).

LDCs normally buy their power from larger companies, sometimes ones dedicated solely to wholesale supply. They re-sell it to the smaller customer. Larger customers typically buy their power directly from the wholesaler, and do not use the LDC.

== See also ==
- Electricity distribution companies by country
- Meter Point Administration Number
- Northern Ireland Electricity
