= Northern Powergrid =

Electrical distribution company based in Newcastle Upon Tyne in England

Northern Powergrid Holdings Company
- Company type: Subsidiary
- Industry: Energy
- Founded: 1996
- Headquarters: Newcastle Upon Tyne, UK
- Area served: North East; Yorkshire; North Lincolnshire
- Number of employees: 2,700
- Parent: Berkshire Hathaway Energy
- Subsidiaries: Integrated Utility Services; CalEnergy Resources Limited
- Website: northernpowergrid.com

Northern Powergrid Holdings Company (formerly CE Electric UK Funding Company) is an electrical distribution company based in Newcastle Upon Tyne in England. It is the owner of Northern Powergrid (Northeast) plc (formerly Northern Electric Distribution Limited (NEDL)) and Northern Powergrid (Yorkshire) plc (formerly Yorkshire Electricity Distribution plc (YEDL)) which are the distribution network operators for the North East England and Yorkshire regions and the North Lincolnshire area.

== History ==
The company was created after the takeover of Northern Electric by CalEnergy in 1996. The company disposed of the supply business of Northern Electric to Innogy plc in 2001 in exchange for the distribution business of Yorkshire Electricity. Thus it represents the electricity distribution systems of the former North Eastern Electricity Board and Yorkshire Electricity Board, which were privatised in 1990.

== Network ==
Northern Powergrid is an electricity distribution business, delivering electricity on behalf of suppliers from the national transmission system to 3.9 million domestic and business customers.

Covering an area of 25,000 square kilometres, Northern Powergrid's network extends from north Northumberland, south to the Humber and northern Lincolnshire, and from the east coast to the Pennines. The network consists of more than 63,000 substations and around 96,000 kilometres of overhead line and underground cables.

== Ownership and structure ==
Northern Powergrid is a wholly owned subsidiary of Berkshire Hathaway Energy.

On 1 November 2011 Northern Powergrid was rebranded from CE Electric UK. The new name is intended to give a better customer representation of the business, its location and operations.

== Company Criticism ==
In November 2021, the United Kingdom was affected by Storm Arwen which led to strong winds and snow which battered the UK on the 25th to the 28th. Over 240,000 people lost supply in the Northern Powergrid region, with their region being the worst affected. The storm was considered so severe for Northern Powergrid, they declared an internal emergency on the 26th, when the worst of the storm struck. Over 290 incidents of damage were reported on the network on the 27th, while the wind was too high to allow engineers to repair the failing infrastructure. 10 days later, at least 1,600 homes were still disconnected. A report was published by the government, highlighting key failures from Northern Powergrid. The company was required to pay out compensation to affected households and businesses.
