= North Eastern Electricity Board =

Northern Eastern Electricity Board
- Formerly: North Eastern Electric Supply Company
- Industry: Electricity
- Founded: 1947
- Defunct: 1990
- Fate: Privatized
- Headquarters: Carliol House, Newcastle upon Tyne, UK

North Eastern Electricity Board was an electricity distribution utility in England, serving the North East of England.

== History ==
Formed as the North Eastern Electricity Board (NEEB) in 1948 as part of the nationalisation of the electricity industry by the Electricity Act 1947, it was privatised in 1990 and renamed as Northern Electric.

=== Nationalised industry ===
The NEEB was responsible for the purchase of electricity from the electricity generator (the Central Electricity Generating Board from 1958) and its distribution and sale of electricity to customers. The key people on the Board were: Chairman G.N. Green (1964, 1967), Deputy Chairman E. Bates (1964, 1967), Full time member J. F. Skipsey (1964).

The total number of customers supplied by the Board was:

NEEB customers, 1949–89
Year	1948/9	1960/1	1965/6	1970/1	1975/6	1978/9	1980/1	1985/6	1987/8	1988/9
No. of Customers, 1000s	674	1058	1132	1205	1270	1305	1326	1361	1379	1390

Electricity, in GWh, sold by North Eastern Electricity Board over its operational life

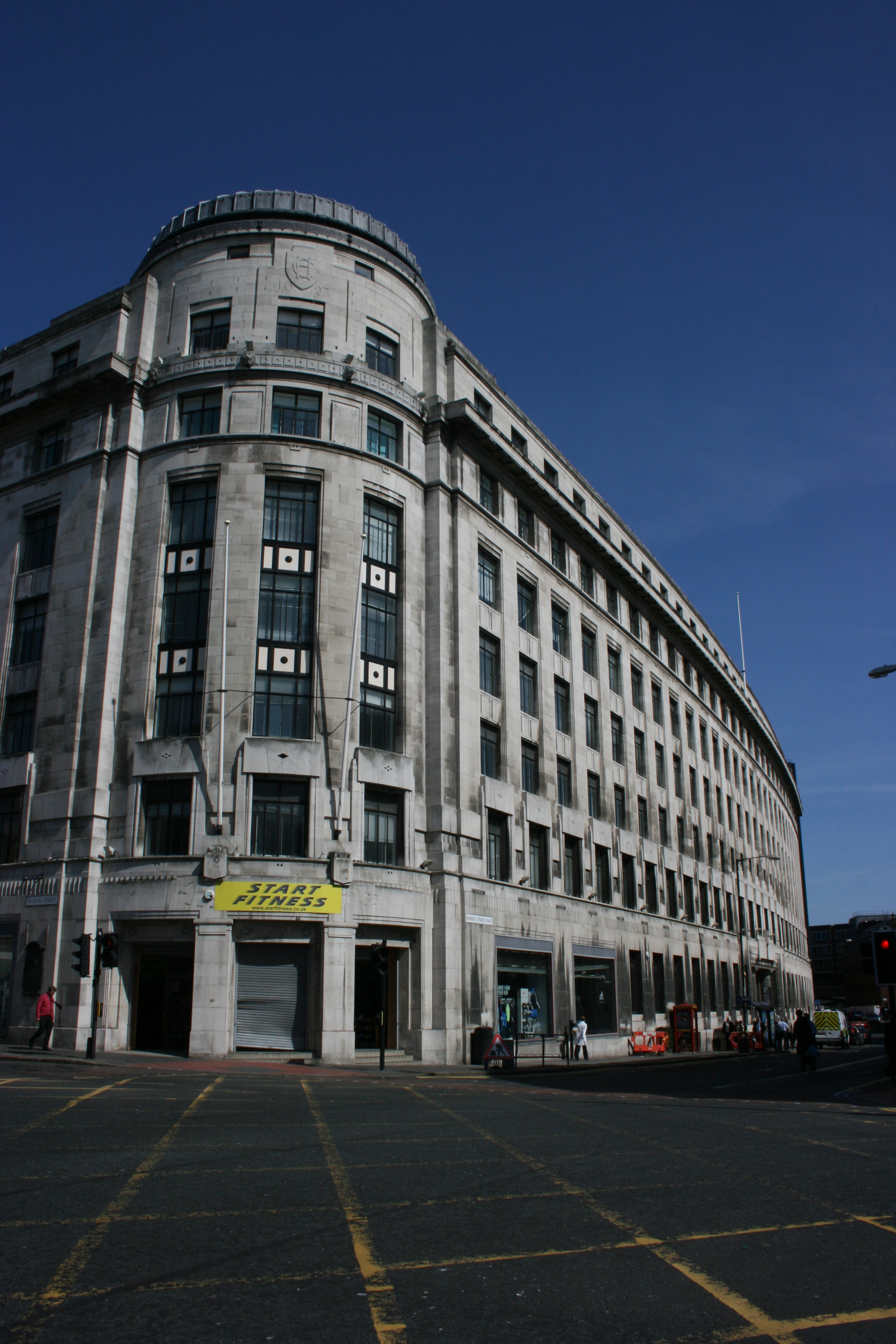
NEEB Headquarters Carliol House

=== Existing electricity suppliers taken over at nationalisation ===
The Electricity (Allocation of Undertakings to Area Boards) Order 1948 (SI 1948/484) transferred the electricity business of the following local authorities and private companies to the new board effective 31 March 1948.

==== Local authorities ====
- Amble Urban District Council
- Crook and Willington Urban District Council
- Darlington Corporation
- Eston Urban District Council
- Guisborough Urban District Council
- Harrogate Corporation
- Middlesbrough Corporation
- Newcastle-upon-Tyne Corporation
- Redcar Corporation
- Richmond (Yorks) Corporation
- Scarborough Corporation
- Seaham Urban District Council
- Skelton and Brotton Urban District Council
- South Shields Corporation
- Stanley Urban District Council
- Stockton-on-Tees Corporation
- Sunderland Corporation
- Tynemouth Corporation
- West Hartlepool Corporation
- Whitby Urban District Council
- York Corporation

==== Private companies ====
- Askrigg and Reeth Electric Supply Company
- Hawes Electric Lighting Company
- Newcastle and District Electric Lighting Company
- North Eastern Electric Supply Company

== Fleet vehicles ==
The NEEB transport fleet was easily identified by its distinctive orange colour and company logo.

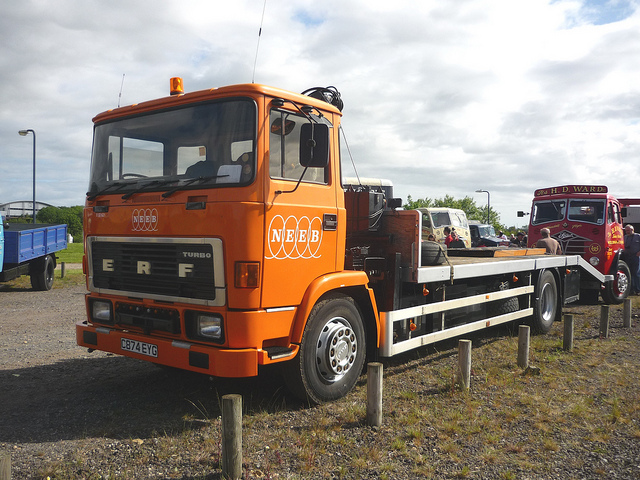
NEEB HIAB used for the loading and unloading of electrical equipment, on site.

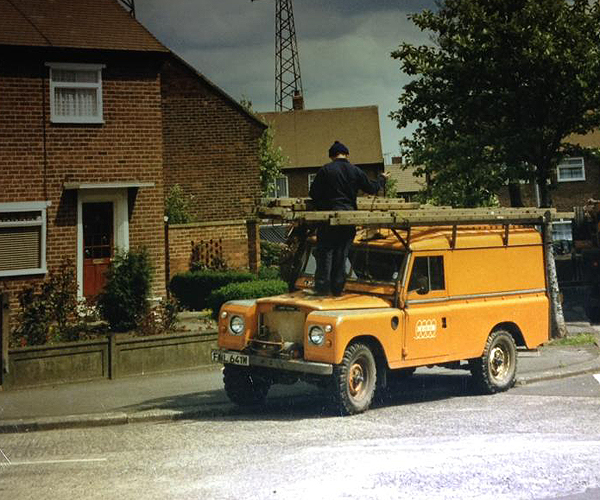
NEEB Land Rover used by the overhead line teams.
