= Yorkshire Electricity =

Former English electricity distribution utility

- Industry: Electricity
- Founded: 1948
- Defunct: 1997
- Fate: Acquired
- Successor: American Electric Power
- Headquarters: Leeds, England, United Kingdom

Yorkshire Electricity was an electricity distribution utility in England, serving much of Yorkshire and parts of Derbyshire, Lincolnshire and Nottinghamshire.

== History ==
The organisation was formed as the Yorkshire Electricity Board in 1948 as part of the nationalisation of the electricity industry by the Electricity Act 1947. The establishment of the company involved the amalgamation of 50 private and local authority power companies. The Yorkshire Electricity Board took over Scarcroft Lodge in north Leeds as its headquarters.

=== Nationalised industry ===
The Yorkshire Electricity Board was responsible for the purchase of electricity from the electricity generator (the Central Electricity Generating Board from 1958) and its distribution and sale of electricity to customers. The key people on the board were chairman Arthur Bond (1964, 1967), deputy chairman R. H. M. Barkham (1964, 1967), and full-time member J. S. Yates (1964, 1967).

The total number of customers supplied by the board was:

Yorkshire Electricity Board customers, 1949–89
Year	1948/9	1960/1	1965/6	1970/1	1975/6	1978/9	1980/1	1985/6	1987/8	1988/9
No. of customers, 1000s	1084	1539	1647	1737	1815	1851	1853	1903	1929	1946

Electricity, in GWh, sold by Yorkshire Electricity Board

=== Existing electricity suppliers taken over at nationalisation ===
The Electricity (Allocation of Undertakings to Area Boards) Order 1948 (SI 1948/484) transferred the electricity business of the following local authorities and private companies to the new board effective 31 March 1948.

==== Local authorities ====
- Adwick-le-Street Urban District Council
- Barnoldswick Urban District Council
- Barnsley Corporation Batley Corporation
- Bingley Urban District Council
- Bradford Corporation
- Bridlington Corporation
- Brighouse Corporation
- Castleford Urban District Council
- Cleethorpes Corporation
- Colne Valley Urban District Council
- Dearne District Electricity Board
- Dewsbury Corporation Doncaster Corporation
- Earby Urban District Council
- Elland Urban District Council
- Gainsborough Urban District Council
- Grimsby Corporation Halifax Corporation
- Hebden Royd Urban District Council
- Heckmondwike Urban District Council
- Holmfirth Urban District Council
- Huddersfield Corporation
- Ilkley Urban District Council
- Keighley Corporation
- Kingston-upon-Hull Corporation
- Leeds Corporation
- Louth Corporation
- Mexborough Urban District Council
- Mirfield Urban District Council
- Morley Corporation
- Normanton Urban District Council
- Ossett Corporation
- Pudsey Corporation
- Rotherham Corporation
- Scunthorpe Corporation
- Sheffield Corporation
- Shipley Urban District Council
- Skipton Urban District Council
- Spenborough Urban District Council
- Todmorden Corporation
- Wakefield Corporation

==== Private companies ====
- Buckrose Light and Power Company
- Craven Hydro-Electric Supply Company
- Electrical Distribution of Yorkshire Ltd.
- North Lincolnshire and Howdenshire Electricity Company
- Pontefract Electricity Company
- South East Yorkshire Light and Power Company
- Tadcaster Electricity Company
- Yorkshire Electric Power Company

=== Post privatisation ===
Yorkshire Electricity Board was privatised in 1990 as the Yorkshire Electricity Group plc.

In June 1993, Homepower stores were opened across the Yorkshire region. Homepower was the retail arm of the company which was a joint venture with East Midlands Electricity. At its peak, Homepower employed 900 people and had 130 stores. This part of the company was sold off in 1996.

In 1997 the company was acquired by American Electric Power (AEP) and Public Service Company of Colorado (part of Xcel Energy) in a deal worth £1.5 billion. In 2001 Innogy plc bought 94.75% of the company in a deal worth £1.8 billion. The company was subsequently split into two entities, one a supply company, the other a distribution utility. The distribution company (Yorkshire Electricity Distribution Limited) was disposed of to CE Electric UK in 2001 in exchange for the supply business of Northern Electric. Northern Powergrid is now the licensed distribution network operator for the Yorkshire region. In 2002, the company divested itself of its Leeds Headquarters as most staff and processes had been transferred to the Midlands headquarters of npower by that time.

Innogy was itself taken over by RWE. The supply company now trades as npower.

== See also ==
- Companies merged into Yorkshire Electricity Board (YEB)
- npower (UK)
