= Littlebrook Power Station =

Series of four oil and coal-fired power stations in Dartford, Kent

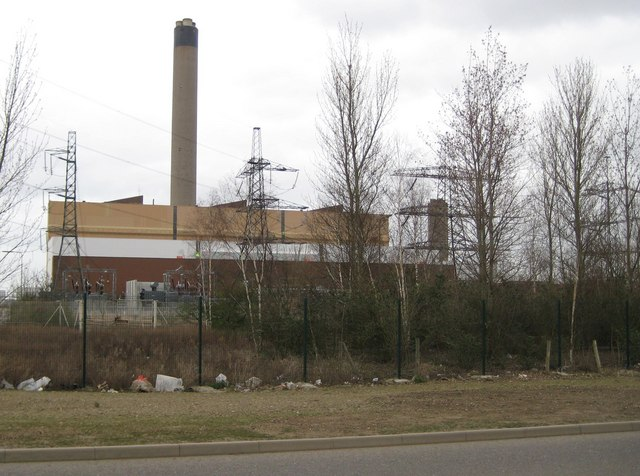
- Littlebrook D power station Viewed from the south in March 2008
- Country: England
- Location: Kent, South East England
- Coordinates: 51.465278°N 0.241667°E
- Status: Decommissioned and demolished
- Construction began: 'A' 1935; 'B' 1946; 'C' 1949; 'D' 1976
- Commission date: 'A' 1939; 'B' 1949; 'C' 1952; 'D' 1981
- Decommission date: 'A' 1973; 'B' 1975; 'C' 1981; 'D' 2015
- Owners: County of London Electric Lighting Co. (1939–1948); British Electricity Authority (1948–1955); Central Electricity Authority (1955–1957); Central Electricity Generating Board (1958–1990); National Power (1991–2001); RWE npower (2001–2015)
- Operator: As owner. RWE npower

Thermal power station
- Primary fuel: Coal-fired 'A' & 'B'; Oil-fired 'C' & 'D'
- Site area: 72 hectare
- Chimneys: 'A' 1; 'B' 2; 'C' 2; 'D' 1
- Cooling towers: None
- Cooling source: River water

Power generation
- Units operational: 'A' 1 × 60 MW & 2 × 30 MW; 'B' 2 × 60 MW; 'C' 4 × 60 MW; 'D' 3 × 660 MW
- Make and model: see text
- Units decommissioned: All

External links
- Commons: Related media on Commons

The Littlebrook Power Station were a series of four oil and coal-fired power stations situated on the south bank of the River Thames, next to the Queen Elizabeth 2 Bridge and the Dartford Tunnel in Dartford, Kent. The final power station, Littlebrook D, ceased operating in March 2015, and has now been demolished.

== Littlebrook A ==
The first power station on the site was the coal-fired Littlebrook A Power Station, built by the County of London Electric Lighting Co. in the early 1930s. It commenced generation in 1939 with the first 30MW unit a second unit of 30MW and a third of 60 MW was completed in 1940. Coal was initially brought to the station by rail, until a riverside pier was completed. The station was later converted to burn supplementary oil over coal, and remained in use until it closed in 1973, by which time its thermal efficiency was just 16.15 per cent. The station had six coal-fired boilers, three Babcock & Wilcox chain grate and three International Combustion pulverised fuel boilers each of 256,000 lb/hr rating. The steam raised in the boilers was fed to three steam receivers which in turn supplied three steam turbine generators. Steam was delivered to the turbines at 600 psi (41.4 bar) and 427 °C. Two of the turbines were supplied by CA Parsons at 30 MW each driving a directly coupled air cooled alternator running at 3,000 rpm. The third turbine a 60 MW set was supplied by BTH running at 1,500 rpm driving a 4-pole air cooled alternator. In its last years the 1,500 rpm 4-pole alternator was decoupled from its turbine and used as a synchronous compensator thereby providing voltage regulation to its local grid.

Electricity output from Littlebrook A power station was as follows.

Littlebrook A annual electricity output GWh

== Littlebrook B ==
Planning for Littlebrook B commenced in 1938-9 and contracts were placed before the WWII. Work was suspended as the result of the war, however, and new contracts were placed in 1945. Work on foundations began in 1945, steelwork erection was started in 1946 and the first machine was commissioned in 1949 with the second in 1950. The station was planned for base-load operation with two Metrovick 60 MW 3,000 r.p.m. three cylinder double flow l.p. turbines driving hydrogen cooled 11.8 kV alternators.

Like the A Station, it originally burned coal, but was later converted to burn oil instead and remained in use until 1975. This station featured several new concepts in power generation design; it incorporated the "unit concept" whereby boilers directly supply steam to its designated turbine-generator. (Previously boilers "pooled" steam via a range or receivers to any of the installed turbines). The steam cycle featured "reheat" where steam exhausting from the initial high-pressure turbine cylinder is routed back through the boiler to be reheated thereby increasing its available energy before being returned to the turbine's intermediate cylinder. There were four pulverised fired International Combustion boilers each of 264,650 lb/hr. Steam was delivered to the turbines at 1,285 psi (88.6 bar) and 454 °C. Finally the 60 MW Metropolitan Vickers alternators were cooled by pure hydrogen gas which has a far greater cooling effect than air. These features became common in later power station designs utilising turbine generators rated at 120 MW and over.

Electricity output from Littlebrook B power station was as follows.

Littlebrook B annual electricity output GWh

Littlebrook C, B and A Power Stations, viewed from the east in 1974. The River Thames is out of shot to the right. The A, B and C Stations were built in line successively further from the Thames. This shows them shortly after the A Station was closed. The D Station was later built to their west.

== Littlebrook C ==
Littlebrook C Power Station was opened between 1952 and 1956 by the British Electricity Authority and then the Central Electricity Authority (1955–57), and had a total generating capacity output of 240 MW. Like the two earlier plants, it was originally coal-fired, but was converted burn fuel oil by 1958. The station continued operating until it was replaced by the D Station in 1981. This 'Station was built in response to a rapid demand for electricity as the Country emerged from austerity of the post war years. As such it utilised (a standard build) four 60 MW three cylinder non-reheat C A Parsons steam turbine generators supplied from a steam range fed by seven boilers. (The original design specified eight but the last was never built). The oil-fired International Combustion Limited boilers had an output capacity of 2,520,000 lb/hr (317.5 kg/s) of steam which was delivered to the turbines at 900 psi (62 bar) and 482 °C. The alternators (generators) were hydrogen cooled.

Electricity output from Littlebrook C power station was as follows.

Littlebrook C annual electricity output GWh

== Littlebrook D ==
Littlebrook D was an oil-fired power station and was built by the nationalised Central Electricity Generating Board. The station was built by the Cleveland Bridge Company with construction starting in 1976. The first unit commissioning underway by 1981. The 1980s still saw a potential threat from the Cold War, and as such the CEGB designed Littlebrook D as a robust station with high plant redundancy, meaning that the station would have formed a pivotal role should disaster have struck the city of London. At this time, London was still dependent on several smaller generating stations within the city itself. Due to the flexibility of the oil-fired boilers, a cold unit could be synchronised onto the grid within 4 hours; the increased ability to rapidly increase or decrease load formed a significant part of what made the station attractive on a commercial basis. The boilers had an output capacity of 1788 kg/s of steam. Steam was delivered to the turbines at 158.6 bar and 538 °C. Five 110,000-tonne fuel oil storage tanks were used to store the heavy fuel oil for the main units, and this fuel was delivered to the site by tankers mooring at one of the site's two jetties on the River Thames.

Originally built with three operational units having a design rating of 660 MW MCR (Maximum Continuous Rating), this was increased to 685 MW during commissioning with practically no additional engineering works required which is testament to the robust design standards rigorously upheld by the CEGB. This total generating capacity of 1,370 MW (1,475 MW including open-cycle gas turbines - see below) was enough power to meet the needs of over 2 million people. Unit 3 was held in "long term reserve" for a number of years prior to the station's closure, mainly due to the wear and tear the boiler experienced during the UK miners strike 1984 to 1985 where oil-fired stations were run aggressively while the base load coal stations were struggling to obtain fuel. During this strike all three units operated simultaneously and continuously throughout, with the exception of a short repair period to Unit 3's boiler, thereby exceeding its design intent by continuously generating 2055 MWSO. This resulted in an annual generation of circa 18 000 GWh which may be the unofficial record for the CEGB's 2000 MW class of power station. The remaining two units were still fully operational up to the site's closure, having undergone massive refurbishment investment to increase their efficiency and further improve the quality of emissions from the 215 m (705 ft) tall chimney, which was the fourth tallest chimney in the UK. This investment included the addition of an electrostatic precipitator to remove any particulates present in the flue gas before it left the chimney, and later, upgrading the unit control to a modern programmable logic controller based system.

Littlebrook D was one of a number of stations throughout the UK with black-start capabilities, meaning that it was able to start generating without an external power supply - the station would be one of the first to start generating should the UK experience a partial or complete blackout. Littlebrook D played a vital role in restoring power supplies to the South East of England in the days following the storm force winds of October 1987. The black-start capability was facilitated by the presence of three GEC Gas Turbine Twin Olympus open-cycle gas turbines (OCGTs), each capable of generating 35 MW, which was sufficient to operate the station auxiliary equipment and allow a main unit to be started. Each OCGT set incorporated two Rolls-Royce Olympus jet engines which are industrial derivatives of those that were used on the Concorde aircraft. As well as providing black-start supplies to the station, the fact that they could synchronise and ramp up to full load in under five minutes means they were used to generate at the request of National Grid Company (who operated the UK electricity grid system) to deal with short-term peaks in demand. Such peaks typically arise during the winter months, where evening demand is higher due to lighting and heating requirements. A further facility provided to the National Grid Company by the OCGTs was one of system protection. They would start automatically should the system frequency (50.0 Hz in the UK) fall to 49.6 Hz, which would indicate that the supply from generation was not sufficient to meet the demand. The National Grid Company are obliged to ensure that there is enough operating reserve available at all times and as such, low frequency events are rare and will only arise where a substantial loss of generation has occurred.

A modification was made to one of the units which allowed for alternative fuel trials. Several were trialled at the Littlebrook D site as part of research into generating energy from more sustainable fuel sources.

After privatisation in 1991, the station was owned by National Power, and later by its subsidivision Innogy plc. The station was finally owned by RWE npower which is owned by the German energy company RWE. They decided that Littlebrook would "opt-out" under the Large Combustion Plant Directive, an EU directive aiming to deal with air pollutants created by the combustion of fossil fuels. This essentially meant that Littlebrook D would have to cease to generate after 2015 in its final configuration. The station ceased operating on 31 March 2015.

As a result of Littlebrook Power Station D's closure, each nine 185 Tonne sub station transformers were removed from the power station and delivered to Drax Power Station in Selby for refurbishment, this required RoRo Barge shipments, SPMT operations and M25 closures.

The turbine hall was demolished on 4 April 2019. Littlebrook Power Station was finally demolished by explosion on Friday 30 August 2019. The chimney, the second highest remaining at the time of its demolition, was demolished at 8am on 15 December 2019.

Electricity output from Littlebrook D power station during its initial years of operation was as follows.

Littlebrook D annual electricity output GWh
