= Advanced Plant Management System =

The Advanced Plant Management System (APMS) is a SCADA solution developed in partnership by RWE npower and Thales UK.

Based on a real-time application platform, APMS is a monitoring and control system for any large industrial process. APMS is implemented at more than thirty electric power generation units in the UK, including Tilbury, Didcot A, Aberthaw, Drax and Rugeley power stations.

The APMS system replaced the Cutlass programming language and application system - a real-time control system widely implemented during the 1970s in British power plants by the Central Electricity Generating Board (CEGB) research & development team - in National Power power stations. (PowerGen in contrast retained and modernised its Cutlass systems.)

== See also ==
- npower UK
- Aberthaw power stations
- Didcot power stations
- Fiddlers Ferry power station
- Ironbridge power stations
- Drax power station
- APMS replacing CUTLASS system
