= Drax Power Station =

Biomass power station in North Yorkshire, England

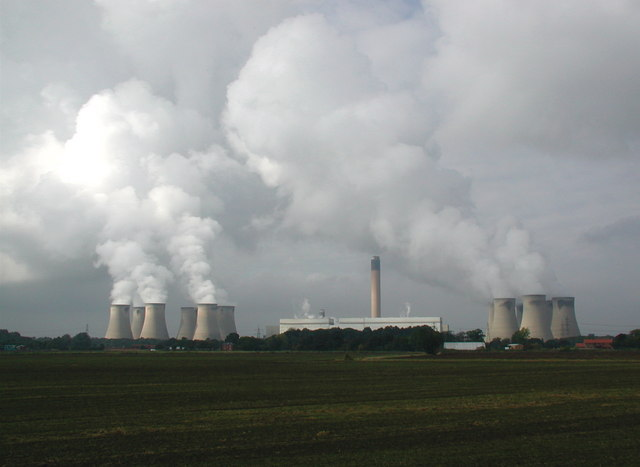
- Drax Power Station; From the east in October 2007
- Country: England
- Location: Drax, North Yorkshire
- Coordinates: 53°44′9″N 0°59′47″W
- Status: Operational
- Construction began: 1967 (Phase 1); 1979 (Phase 2)
- Commission date: 1974 (Phase 1); 1986 (Phase 2)
- Decommission date: 2021 (coal)
- Owners: Central Electricity Generating Board (1974–1990); National Power (1990–1999); AES Corporation (1999–2003); Drax Group (2005–present)
- Operator: Drax Power Limited

Thermal power station
- Primary fuel: Biomass
- Chimneys: 1 main chimney 1 ventilation stack
- Cooling towers: 12 × Natural Draft
- Cooling source: Cooling Towers, River Ouse

Power generation
- Units operational: 4 × 660 MW (biomass)
- Make and model: C. A. Parsons and Company; Siemens
- Nameplate capacity: 1975: 1,980 MW; 1986: 3,960 MW; 2021: 2,595 MW

External links
- Website: www.drax.com
- Commons: Related media on Commons

Drax Power Station is a biomass and former coal power station in Drax, North Yorkshire, England. It has a 2.595 GW capacity for biomass and had a 3.960 GW capacity for coal that was retired in 2021. Its name comes from the nearby village of Drax. It is situated on the River Ouse between Selby and Goole. Its generating capacity of 3,906 megawatts (MW), which includes the shut down coal units, is the highest of any power station in the United Kingdom, providing about 6% of the United Kingdom's electricity supply.

Opened in 1974 and extended in the 1980s, the station was initially operated by the Central Electricity Generating Board. Since privatisation in 1990 ownership has changed several times, and it is operated by the Drax Group. Completed in 1986, it was the newest coal-fired power station in England until it closed in 2021. Flue gas desulphurisation equipment was fitted between 1988 and 1995. The high and low pressure turbines were replaced between 2007 and 2012.

By 2010, the station was co-firing biomass. In 2012, the company announced plans to convert three generating units to solely biomass, burning 7.5 million tonnes imported from the United States and Canada. This work was completed in 2016 and a fourth unit was converted in 2018. The company planned to convert its remaining two coal units to Combined Cycle Gas Turbine units and 200 MW battery storage. However, those two coal units were shut in 2021 without converting them to biomass.

In 2025, the UK government extended its operation to 2031, but at a reduced load factor so it would run less than half as often from 2027 using 100% biomass.

== History ==
Drax was initially conceived by the Central Electricity Generating Board (CEGB) in 1962 as the country's largest power station thus far, at about 3,000 MW. Subsequently, it was decided to use this opportunity as their first station to use the 660 MW turbogenerator sets which were planned to become the new standard, so the planning consents were revised to about 4,000 MW.

Following the Selby Coalfield discovery in 1967 the Board would build three large Aire valley power stations to use its coal. These were an expansion of the station at Ferrybridge, a new station at Eggborough, and Drax, which would be the largest.

=== Construction ===
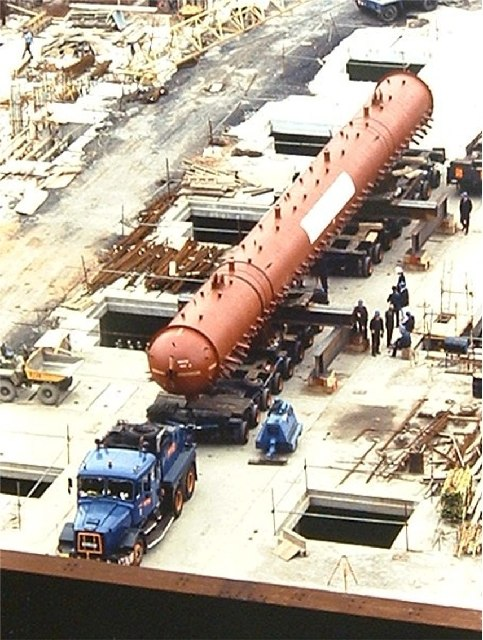
The delivery of a Babcock steam drum during construction (1974)

Authority to carry out preparatory works was granted in December 1964, leading to full permission in March 1966, on the basis that the station would be designed to accommodate six 660 MW units, but that only the first three be proceeded with for the time being.

Ground work for these three units, known at the time as 'Drax First Half', started in 1967. Two units were synchronised to the grid in 1973, and the third in 1974.

Although authorised, the second half of the project – known as 'Drax Completion' – was deferred, because during the project's gestation the Board's energy mix policy shifted to working towards a majority nuclear system. The board decided in 1977 that construction of the final three units would commence in 1979 with the target of commissioning in 1985/6, as part of meeting load growth with an adjusted mix policy aiming for a balance of coal, nuclear, and oil. However, later that year in July, the Government requested that Drax Completion proceed immediately, ahead of requirements, in order to secure jobs in the North East's heavy manufacturing industries. The Board agreed to this subject to being compensated.

The architects were Jeff King and Dennis Merritt of Clifford, Tee and Gale. The architectural critic Reyner Banham was scathing of the design: 'less a brick cathedral than a concrete bunker... obsession with ribbed surfaces and forceful projections that have their origins in brutalism'. Costain constructed the foundations and cable tunnels; Sir Robert McAlpine Ltd. laid the roads and built the ancillary buildings; Mowlem laid the deep foundations; Alfred McAlpine built the administration and control buildings; Balfour Beatty undertook general building works; and James Scott installed cabling.

Tarmac Construction undertook the civil engineering works; Holst Civil Engineers built the chimney; Bierrum & Partners built the cooling towers; N.G. Bailey installed cabling; Reyrolle, English Electric and South Wales Switchgear produced and installed the switchgear; English Electric manufactured the generator cooling water pumps; T.W. Broadbent maintained the temporary electrical supplies; and Sulzer Brothers manufactured the boiler feed pumps. In both phases the boilers were made by Babcock Power Ltd and the generators by C. A. Parsons and Company.

The second phase was completed in 1986.

Construction of the power station entailed the demolition of a farm known as Wood House.

Mitsui Babcock fitted flue-gas desulphurisation (FGD) equipment between 1988 and 1995.

=== Post-privatisation ===
On privatisation of the CEGB in 1990, the station was transferred from the CEGB to the privatised generating company National Power, which sold it to the AES Corporation in November 1999 for £1.87 billion (US$3 billion). AES relinquished ownership in August 2003, after falling into £1.3 billion of debt. Independent directors continued the operation to ensure security of supply. In December 2005, after refinancing, ownership passed to the Drax Group.

Separate acquisition offers from International Power, private equity group Texas Pacific, and a private equity backed bid from Constellation Energy were rejected for undervaluing the company. The company's valuation subsequently increased to 2005 as a result of rising electricity prices, and on 15 December 2005 Drax Group plc floated its shares on the London Stock Exchange, issuing £400 million worth of shares, on a valuation of £2.6 billion.

In 2009, Drax Group submitted a planning application for the 300 MW biomass Ouse Renewable Energy Plant next to the power station. Government approval was obtained in mid 2011. In February 2012 the company ceased planning development of the plant, citing logistics costs, and uncertainty concerning government financial support for biomass.

=== Carbon capture and storage ===
In 2006 Drax Power Limited, in response to a government consultation, stated they were sponsoring development studies into carbon capture and storage (CCS), but noted that it was not then commercially viable, with costs comparable with nuclear or offshore wind power. On 17 June 2009, Secretary of State for Energy and Climate Change Ed Miliband announced plans that would require all UK coal-fired power stations to be fitted with CCS technology by the early 2020s or face closure.

In 2012 a CCS project at Drax was shortlisted for government funding. In 2013 the White Rose Carbon Capture and Storage project (formerly the UK OXY CCS project) was shortlisted for the UK government's CCS scheme and in late 2013 was awarded a two-year FEED contract (Front End Engineering Design) for the CCS project. As of June 2014, Drax is engaged in a joint venture with Alstom and BOC to build a 626 MW oxygen-fuelled combustion power station adjacent to the existing Drax site. National Grid would simultaneously construct a pipeline to transport CO_{2} 40 miles (64 km) to the Yorkshire coast for sequestration.

In July 2014 the project was awarded €300 million funding from the European Commission.

A schematic diagram of the proposed pilot scheme at Drax power station to capture and store carbon dioxide emissions

In September 2015 Drax announced it would not be making any further investments into the CCS scheme after completion of the feasibility study because negative changes to government support for renewable energy had made the project too financially risky, plus drops in the company's share price due to the same uncertainty had reduced Drax's ability to raise funds. Front End Engineering Design was expected to continue under Alstom and BOC with the project still being hosted at Drax. In late 2015 the UK Government withdrew its potential financial support for CCS projects – up to £1 billion of funding, reversing support promised in the governing party's 2015 election manifesto. As a result, Leigh Hackett, CEO of Capture Power stated that "[I]t is difficult to imagine its continuation in the absence of crucial government support".

In May 2018, Drax announced a new carbon capture and storage pilot scheme that it would undertake in conjunction with the Leeds-based firm, C-Capture. The focus of this pilot will be on capturing carbon post combustion from the biomass burners as opposed to the coal burners. Drax will invest £400,000 into the project. The company, C-Capture, is a side company of the Department of Chemistry established at the University of Leeds. This would yield about 1-tonne (1.1-ton) of CO_{2} stored per day from the process, which could be sold on for use in the drinks industry. The pilot scheme was launched in February 2019. The capture of carbon from biomas burners is known as Bio Energy with Carbon Capture and Storage (BECCS).

== Design and specification ==
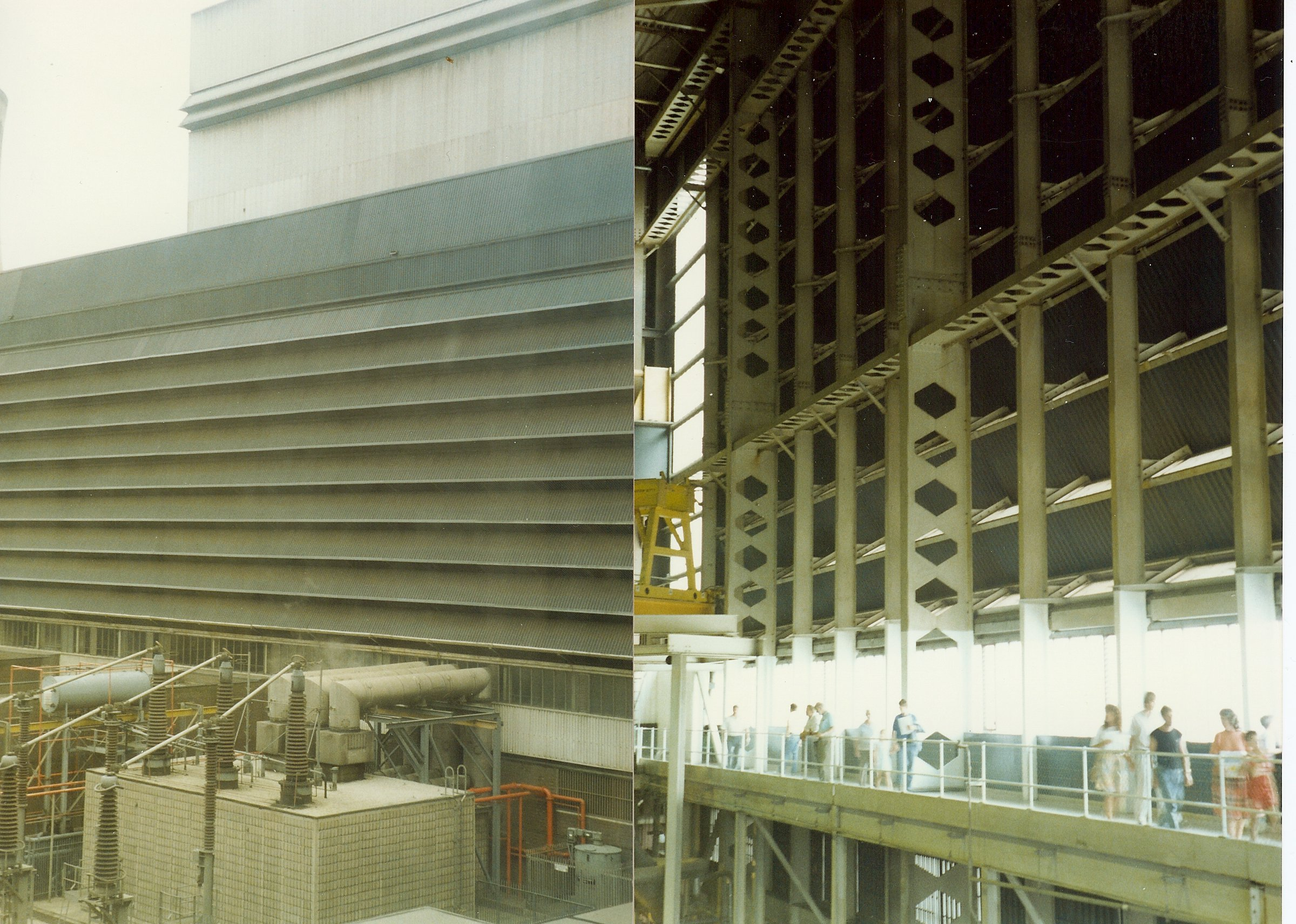
Turbine hall (left: outside, right: inside) The taller light-coloured building behind is the boiler house

The main buildings are of steel frame and metal clad construction. The main features are a turbine hall, a boiler house, a chimney and 12 cooling towers. The boiler house is 76 m (249 ft) high, and the turbine hall is 400 m (1,300 ft) long.

The chimney stands 259.3 m (851 ft) tall, with an overall diameter of 26 m (85 ft), and weighs 44,000 tonnes. It consists of three elliptical flues of reinforced concrete, each serving two of the six boilers, set within a cylindrical 'wind shield', also of reinforced concrete. The topmost elements, the three cap rings of the flues which extend above the wind shield, are of cast iron. When finished, the chimney was the largest industrial chimney in the world, and is still the tallest in the United Kingdom. The chimney's dimensions, including the height, were dictated by a design total capacity of 5,100 m^{3}/s of gases at 26 m/s. As the station was designed and constructed prior to the CEGB's commitment to Flue Gas Desulphurisation, extensive measures were made to limit acid attack from 'sulphurous condensate', namely the lining of the flues with a fluoroelastomer, and coating of the upper 29 m (95 ft) of the external surfaces with a mix of acid-resisting tiles and said fluoroelastomer.

The twelve 114 m (374 ft) tall natural draft cooling towers stand in two groups of six to the north and south of the station. They are made of reinforced concrete, in the typical hyperboloid design, and each have a base diameter of 92 m (302 ft).

The station was the third-largest coal-fired power station in Europe, after Bełchatów Power Station in Poland, and Neurath Power Station in Germany. It produces around 24 terawatt hours (TWh) (86.4 petajoules) of electricity annually. Although it generates around 1,500,000 tonnes of ash and 22,800,000 tonnes of carbon dioxide each year, it is the most carbon-efficient coal-fired power plant in the United Kingdom.

The design life was set out in terms of number of start-ups and operating "cycles", but with the presumption that the station would operate as a standard 2nd-tier (nuclear stations being 1st-tier) baseload generator in the pattern well established under the centralised state-owned electricity system, it was summarised as "in the order of 40 years". The minimum requirement was for providing 'full load for weekdays, over a spell of 3 months' with an availability over 85%. Weekend operations were expected to be between 50–100% of full power. Despite this intent for baseload operation, it was designed with a reasonable ability for load-following, being able to ramp up or down by 5% of full power per minute within the range of 50–100% of full power.

=== Ouse jetty ===
The power station also has a jetty on the River Ouse, with a loading capacity of 200 tonnes. Historically the jetty was built and used for the construction of the power station in the 1960s/70s – such as the delivery of equipment. In 2015 a planning application was submitted for the improvement of the jetty's load capacity to 500 tonnes by White Rose CCS developer Capture Power Limited (Drax/Alstom/BOC joint venture), for the construction of the CCS project.

== Fuel supply ==
The main transport route to the power station for fuel (originally coal) is train via a 4 1/2-mile-long (7.2 km) freight-only section of the former Hull and Barnsley Railway, from the Pontefract Line at Hensall Junction. A balloon loop rail layout is used so that wagons of coal do not need to be shunted after being unloaded. Merry-go-round trains are used, so that wagons can be unloaded without the train stopping as it passes through an unloading house. On average, there are 35 deliveries a day, 6 days a week.

The power station also has a jetty (see § Jetty). Imports via the jetty ended c. 1980. In 2004 the jetty was trialled for the import of Tall Oil by barge.

=== Coal supply until 2021 ===
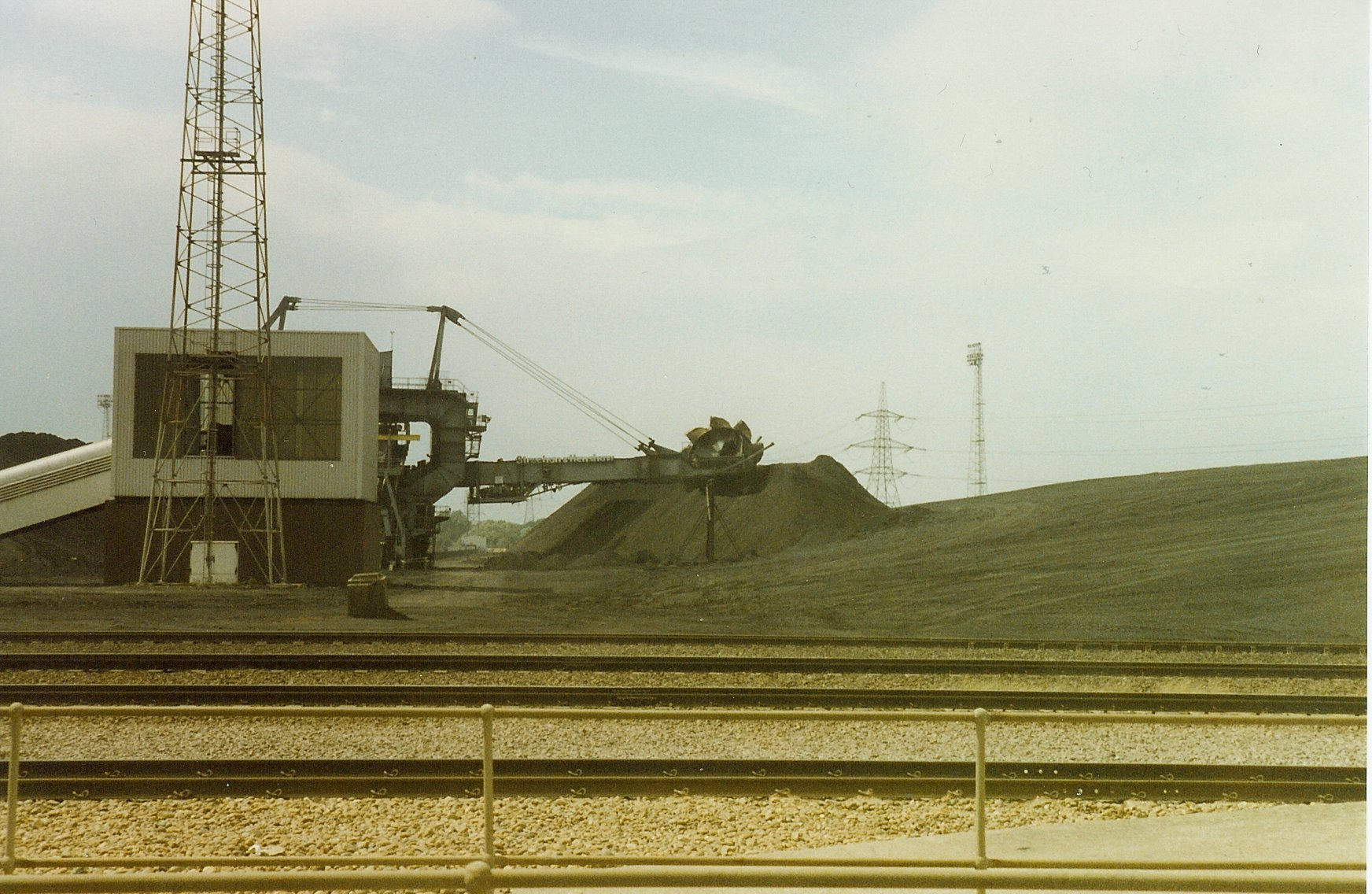
The rotary coal loader feeding the plant from the stockyard

In its original form, the station had a maximum potential consumption of 36,000 tonnes of coal a day. In 2011, it consumed 9.1 million tonnes of coal. This coal came from a mixture of both domestic and international sources, with domestic coal coming from mines in Yorkshire, the Midlands and Scotland, and foreign supplies coming from Australia, Colombia, Poland, Russia and South Africa. As of 2020, all coal was sourced internationally.

Fuel and other bulk commodities were supplied via a 6-mile (9.7 km) stretch of the old Hull and Barnsley Railway line off the Wakefield and Goole railway line. Rail facilities include a west-facing junction on the Goole line, gross-weight and tare-weight weighbridges, limestone and gypsum handling facilities, including a handling building and control room for the FGD plant, FGD Sidings G and H, biomass offload (Track A), coal offload (Tracks A, B and C), bypass line (Track D), oil siding (Track E) and ash loading (Track F) and an unloading building and control room.

When the station opened, most of the coal burned was from local collieries in Yorkshire, including Kellingley Colliery, Prince of Wales, Ackton Hall, Sharlston Colliery, Fryston Colliery, Askern Colliery and Bentley Colliery. Following the miners' strike in the mid-1980s, by 2006, all but Kellingley had closed. (Kellingley closed at the end of 2015.) UK Coal had a five-year contract to supply coal, which ended at the end of 2009, from Kellingley, Maltby and, until its closure in 2007, Rossington. Coal was also brought from Harworth Colliery until it was mothballed, and was supplied by Daw Mill in Warwickshire.

The foreign coal was brought via various ports by rail. In c.2007 GB Railfreight won a contract to move coal brought from the Port of Tyne, celebrated by the company naming one of their locomotives Drax Power Station in 2007. DB Cargo UK haul coal from the nearby ports of Hull and Immingham, and from Hunterston Terminal on the west coast of Scotland.

In 2021, all coal supplies to Drax Power Station and commercial electricity generation from coal ended in accordance with the plan to end coal fired generation announced in 2020 which will see Drax transition to biomass ahead of the deadline to phase out coal from the UK energy system.

=== Petroleum coke ===
The station started to trial the co-firing of petroleum coke (petcoke) in one of its boilers in June 2005, ending in June 2007, burning 15% petcoke and 85% coal. Petcoke was burned to make the electricity more competitive as the price of running the FGD equipment was making the electricity more expensive. The Environment Agency (EA) granted permission for the trial in June 2004, despite the plans being opposed by Friends of the Earth and Selby Council. To meet their concerns, emissions were constantly monitored through the trial, and they were not allowed to burn petcoke without operating the FGD plant to remove the high sulphur content of the emissions. The trial proved that there were no significant negative effects on the environment, and so in late 2007 Drax Group applied to move from trial conditions to commercial burning. The EA granted permission in early 2008 after agreeing with Drax's findings that the fuel had no significant negative effects on the environment. The station was able to burn up to 300,000 tonnes of the fuel a year, and stock up to 6,000 tonnes on site.

== Biomass ==
=== Co-firing ===
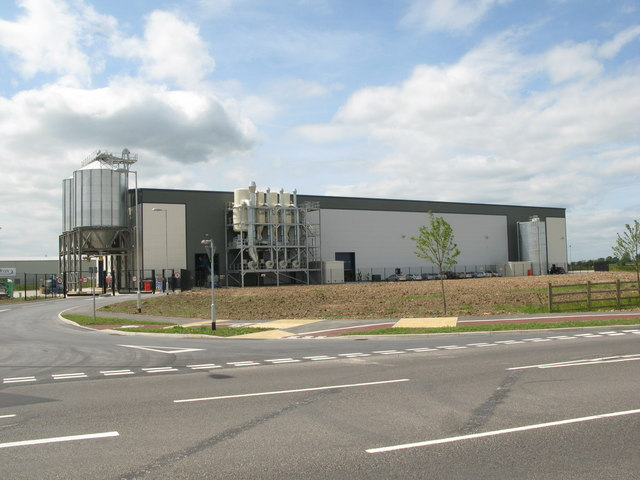
The Goole straw pellet plant (2009)

The station tested co-firing biomass in the summer of 2004, and in doing so was the first power station in the UK to be fuelled by wood. The initial trial of 14,100 tonnes of willow was locally sourced from nearby Eggborough. Since the trial, the station's use of biomass has continued. It uses direct injection for firing the biomass, whereby it bypasses the pulverising mills and is either injected directly into the boiler or the fuel line, for greater throughput. In 2009 a target was set for 12.5% of the station's energy to be sourced from biomass, and the shift to biomass was intended to contribute to the aim of cutting CO_{2} emissions by 15%.

The station burns a large range of biomass, mostly wood pellets, sunflower pellets, olive, peanut shell husk and rape meal. The majority comes from overseas. A 100,000 tonne pa capacity straw pelletization facility was constructed at Capitol Park, Goole in 2008, opened 2009. Construction of specialised biomass handling facilities began in 2009 at the Port of Tyne and at Drax.

=== New biomass plants ===
In the 2000s Drax Group applied for planning permission to build a new 300 MW power station, fuelled entirely by biomass, to the north of the station; the Ouse Renewable Energy Plant was expected to burn 1,400,000 tonnes of biomass each year, saving 1,850,000 tonnes of CO_{2} emissions, and expected to create 850 construction jobs and 150 permanent jobs created once opened, through direct and contract employment. Plans were submitted to the Department of Energy and Climate Change in July 2009 for review; if permission was granted, construction was scheduled begin in late 2010 and to take up to three and a half years. Two other 300 MW biomass plants were planned by Drax at the ports of Hull and Immingham.

In 2012 Drax group abandoned plans for the discrete biomass plant development, due to changes in government subsidies for biomass energy production favouring plant conversions over newly built plants. It switched to a project to convert half of the units at its existing plant to biomass firing.

=== Full firing with biomass ===
In September 2012 Drax Group announced the conversion to full firing with biomass of three of its six units. The first unit was scheduled to be online by June 2013, the second unit in 2014, and the third by 2017; initially a biomass supply had been secured for the first unit. The cost was estimated at £700 million ($1.13 billion), including modifications to fuel mills and boilers and the construction of storage structures and conveyors for the wood pellet fuel. Each unit will consume about 2.3 million tonnes of biomass yearly, requiring an estimated annual total of 7.5 million tonnes in 2017. This is equivalent to two-thirds of Europe's entire energy biomass consumption in 2010, and requires 1,200,000 ha (4,600 mi^{2}; 12,000 km^{2}) of forest to supply on a continuous basis. North America was expected to be the source of the vast majority of the biomass, although some would be domestically sourced willow and elephant grass.

Drax Group's decision was enabled by a new UK government policy, effective in April 2013, to award 1.0 tradable ROCs (renewable obligation certificates) per megawatt of power generation from coal power plants that are fully converted to burn biomass; CEO Dorothy Thompson stated the company intended to become a predominately biomass-fuelled energy producer. By April 2013 financing for the scheme include £190 million through sale of shares, £100 million from Prudential/ M&G UK Companies Financing Fund, £50 million from the UK Green Investment Bank, and £75 million Friends Life (underwritten by HM Treasury), as well as a £400 million credit facility.

As of 2013 there were plans to install 1 million tonne per year wood pellets pelletizing plants at Morehouse Parish, Louisiana, and Gloster, Mississippi, which would be shipped by road and rail to the port of Baton Rouge, Louisiana then shipped in 50,000-tonne cargo ships to UK. In the financial report for 2013, Drax announced that an additional 2 million tons pelletisation capacity was being considered, likely to be built in the US.

In 2013 the company signed an agreement with Associated British Ports to develop handling facilities at the Hull, Immingham and Grimsby; construction of automated facilities began in 2013, creating capacities of 3 and 1 million tonnes per year at the ports of Immingham and Hull respectively, adding to the 1.4 million tonne per year Port of Tyne biomass facility built in 2009. In the same year a new design covered rail wagon with high volumetric capacity for transporting the low density biomass pellets was unveiled for use by Drax in the UK; 200 wagons of the type were ordered. At Drax pellets would be stored in domes, and transferred by a conveyor system before grinding to dust for use.

The Shepherd Building Group was contracted to construct the biomass handling and storage facilities at Drax, with RPS Group as the civil engineer. The design included automated rail to storage handling, screening and storage facilities consisting of four 50 by 63 m (164 by 207 ft) high by wide storage domes with a capacity of 110,000 m^{3} (3,900,000 cu ft). The concrete dome technology was supplied by E & D Company, PLLC (trading as Engineering System Solutions, ES2) and Dome Technology LLC.

By July 2013 one firing unit had been converted, and was reported to be functioning correctly; by 2013 the conversion of the second and third units was scheduled for 2014 and during or before 2016 respectively. The second unit was converted by May 2014, initially co-firing an 85% biomass/coal mix due to limited biomass supply.

In April 2014 Drax was awarded a renewable contract for difference (CFD) subsidy for biomass based power generation on another converted coal firing unit, but a third unit, which had been previously marked as eligible for CFD funding was excluded; Drax Group then legally challenged the decision, initially obtaining a ruling in its favour, which was overturned in the Court of Appeal. In July 2014 the High Court ruled in Drax's favour.

Biomass conversion at Drax led to it requiring 82% of UK biomass imports from the US in 2014 (60% overall of all US wood pellet export), a large factor in a 40% yearly increase in biomass export from that country; US sourced imports represented 58% of Drax's biomass use in 2014, with 22% from Canada.

A port facility in Baton Rouge, Louisiana was completed by April 2015. In mid-2015 Drax reached an agreement with Peel Ports to construct a 3 million ton per year biomass importation facility at the Port of Liverpool, estimated cost £100 million. The rail connected facility was to include 100,000 tonnes storage, and be constructed by Graham Construction.

In September 2015 Drax Group and Infinis began a legal action against the UK government due to claimed insufficient notice being given about the withdrawal of a climate related tax exemption (see Climate Change Levy) – Drax claimed the change would reduce its earnings by £30 million. The claim was rejected by the High Court in February 2016.

In December 2016 the European Competition Commission approved UK government subsidies for the conversion of the third unit to biomass burning.

Drax's subsidy scheme was scheduled to end in 2027, with Drax arguing for an extension to 2030. In February 2025, the UK government extended its operation from 2027 to 2031, but at a reduced 27% maximum load factor using 100% sustainable wood, so it would run "less than half as often as it currently does", generally only at times of high electricity demand. Drax was given a contract for difference at £113/MWh in 2012 pounds, CPI inflation linked so about £155/MWh in 2025.

=== Concern about sustainability claims ===
In October 2022, a BBC Panorama programme titled "The Green Energy Scandal Exposed" about Drax investigated "where the wood comes from and uncovers an environmental scandal". The programme included that Drax had purchased logging licences for 1 square mile (260 ha) of Canadian forest, including areas of old-growth forest, and a reporter "followed a truck from a Drax mill to verify it was picking up whole logs". Drax responded that Panorama had "sought to repeat the inaccurate claims about biomass which have for years been promoted by those who are ill-informed about the science behind sustainable forestry" and that "The Panorama team did not contact us while they were conducting their research". They stated that Canadian forests "are not harvested for biomass, they are harvested for high value timber used in construction. 80% of the material used to make our pellets at Drax in Canada is sawmill residues – sawdust, wood chips and bark left over when the timber is processed."

In 2024, Drax paid a penalty of £25 million after the regulator Ofgem determined there was "an absence of adequate data governance and controls in place" regarding Canadian wood sources from April 2021 to March 2022. Ofgem found the breach was technical and not deliberate.

In January 2026, the Financial Times reported that court documents from a 2025 employment tribunal case brought by Drax's former head of public affairs showed that senior executives had raised concerns internally about the validity of sustainability statements made by Drax. They recorded that a Drax senior government policy manager told an internal probe that she thought statements Drax made in 2022 after the Panorama programme misrepresented the situation and would be difficult to support in meetings with the government.

On 26 February 2026, Drax announced it was reducing the amount of Canadian biomass it burns, and from 2027 will only burn biomass from the U.S. It would continue producing pellets at its plant in Canada but export to other countries, primarily in Asia.

A Financial Conduct Authority investigation, started in 2025 into the Drax statements, is ongoing.

== Electricity generation ==
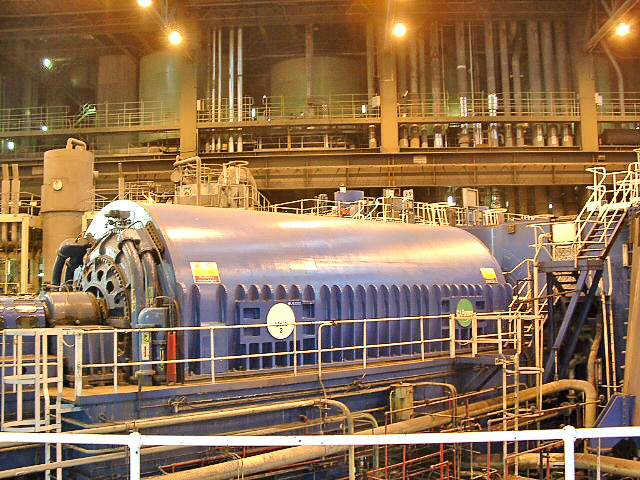
Generator unit No. 2

Coal is fed into one of 30 coal bunkers, each with a capacity of 1,000 tonnes. Each bunker feeds two of the 60 pulverisers, each of which can crush 36 tonnes of coal an hour. The station has six Babcock Power boilers, each weighing 4,000 tonnes. The powdered coal from ten pulverisers is blasted into each boiler through burners, which are ignited by propane. In 2003 the original burners were replaced by low nitrogen oxide burners.

Each of the six boilers feed steam to a steam turbine set, consisting of one high pressure (HP) turbine, one intermediate pressure (IP) turbine and three low pressure (LP) turbines. Each HP turbine generates 140 MW. Exhaust steam from them is fed back to the boiler and reheated, then fed to the 250 MW IP turbines and finally passes through the 90MW LP turbines. This gives each generating set a generating capacity of 660 MW: with six generating sets, the station has a total capacity of 3,960 MW. Each of the generating units is equipped with the Advanced Plant Management System (APMS), a system developed by RWE npower and Thales, and implemented by Capula.

The station also has six gas turbines providing backup for breakdowns, or shut downs in the National Grid. Their annual output is generally low, generating 75 MW and three of the units have been mothballed and are out of operation, but they could be refurbished. Emissions from these units are released through the station's second, smaller chimney, to the south of the main stack.

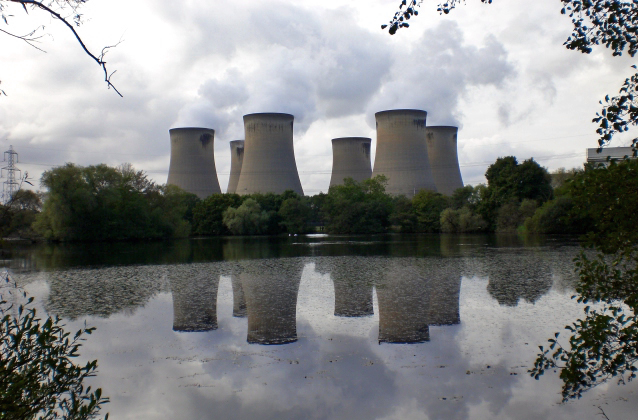
Southern cooling towers seen across the River Ouse, which supplies water for the condensers

Between 2007 and 2012 the high and low pressure turbines were replaced by Siemens in a £100 million programme.

=== Cooling system ===
Water is essential to a thermal power station, heated to create steam to turn the steam turbines. Water used in the boilers is taken from two licensed boreholes on site. Once this water has been through the turbines it is cooled by condensers using water taken from the nearby River Ouse. Water is pumped from the river by a pumphouse on the river, north of the station. Once it has been through the condenser, the water is cooled by one of the natural draft cooling towers, with two towers serving each generating set. Once cooled, the water is discharged back into the river.

== Waste products ==
=== Flue gas desulphurisation ===
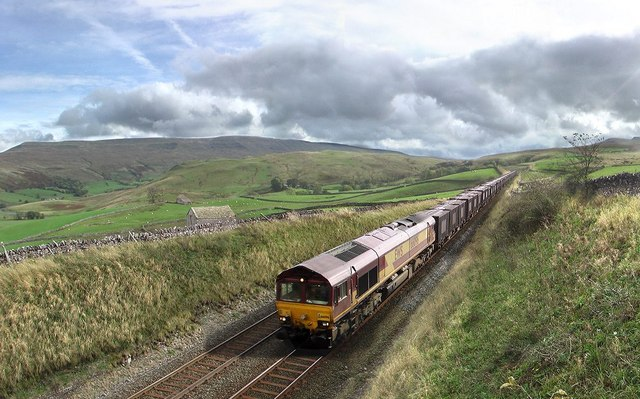
A train of gypsum heading from the station to Kirkby Thore on the Settle-Carlisle Railway

All six units are served by an independent wet limestone-gypsum FGD plant, which was installed between 1988 and 1996. This diverts gases from the boilers and passes them through a limestone slurry, which removes at least 90% of the sulphur dioxide. This is equivalent to removing over 250,000 tonnes of SO_{2} each year. The process requires 10,000 tonnes of limestone a week, sourced from Tunstead Quarry in Derbyshire.

A byproduct of the process is gypsum, with 15,000 tonnes produced each week. This goes to be used in the manufacture of plasterboard. The gypsum is sold exclusively to British Gypsum, and it is transported by rail to their plants at Kirkby Thore (on the Settle-Carlisle Line), East Leake (on the former Great Central Main Line) and occasionally to Robertsbridge (on the Hastings Line). DB Cargo UK transport the gypsum.

In 2023, Drax announced a full withdrawal from using coal power past the winter contingency agreement, Drax announced that it will now embark on a decommissioning process to remove coal-related infrastructure from the site. This will commence with the removal of the flue gas desulphurisation plant that was built in the 1990s to remove 90% of the sulphur from the plant’s air emissions.

=== Ash use and disposal ===
Pulverised fuel ash (PFA) and furnace bottom ash (FBA) are two byproducts from the burning of coal. Each year, the station produces about 1,000,000 tonnes of PFA and around 220,000 tonnes of FBA: all FBA and 85% of PFA is sold. Under the trade name Drax Ash Products, the ash is sold to the local building industry, where it is used in the manufacture of blocks, cement products, grouting and the laying of roads. The ash is also used in other parts of the UK.

Between 2005 and 2007, PFA was used as an infill at four disused salt mines in Northwich in Cheshire. 1,100,000 tonnes was used in the project, which was to avoid a future risk of subsidence in the town. Ash was delivered by DB Schenker in ten trains a week, each carrying 1,100 tonnes. Following a trial in January 2010, PFA is also transported to Waterford, Ireland by boat. One ship a month will transport 1,200 tonnes for the manufacture of construction materials. This will replace 480 lorry journeys annually and is deemed more environmentally friendly.

The unsold PFA is sent by conveyor belt to the Barlow ash mound, which is used for disposal and temporary stockpile. Three conveyors feed the mound, with a total capacity of 750 tonnes an hour. FGD gypsum is disposed of on the mound if it is not of a high enough grade to be sold. The mound has won a number of awards for its nature conservation work.

== Environmental effects ==
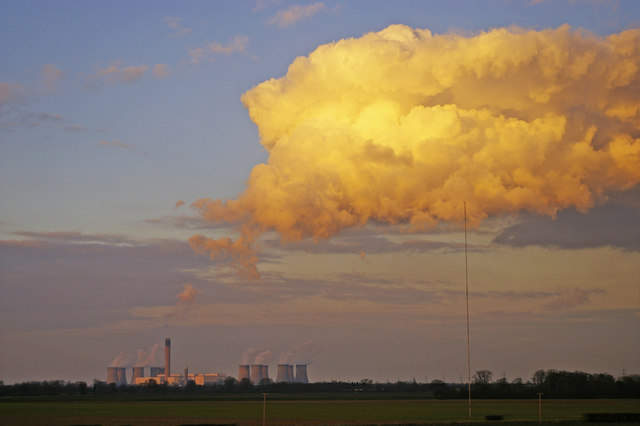
Drax power station is the largest CO_{2} emitter in the UK. The cloud of water vapour emitted by the station is due to scrubber systems introducing moisture into the exhaust stream. Despite its visible density, it contains less pollutants than an invisible stream of unfiltered exhaust.

The environmental effects of coal burning are well documented. Coal is considered to be "easily the most carbon-intensive and polluting form of energy generation available". In 2007 the station produced 22,160,000 tonnes of CO_{2}, making it the largest single source of CO_{2} in the UK. Between 2000 and 2007, there has been a net increase in carbon dioxide CO_{2} of over 3,000,000 tonnes. The station also had the highest estimated emissions of nitrogen oxides in the European Union.

In 2007, in a move to try to lower CO_{2} emissions, Drax Group signed a £100 million contract with Siemens Power Generation to re-blade the steam turbines over four years. This is the largest steam turbine modernisation ever undertaken in the UK, and will increase efficiency. Coupled with the co-firing of biomass, this was part of a target to reduce CO_{2} emissions by 15% by 2011.

Drax's annual report for 2013 reported that Drax's annual emissions were at 20,612,000 tonnes of CO_{2}. This was a slight decrease from 2007 levels due to the burning of biomass. Drax remained the UK's largest single emitter of carbon dioxide up until 2016, when the power station claimed that its improvement programmes and conversion to burning biomass, had meant a drastic decrease in greenhouses gases being released into the atmosphere.

Drax has opted in to the Large Combustion Plant Directive (LCPD) and thus is permitted to continue operating beyond 2015. The use of flue gas desulfurisation ensures that the limits on sulphur dioxide emissions are not exceeded.

== Protests, industrial action and incidents ==
=== Climate Camp (2006) ===
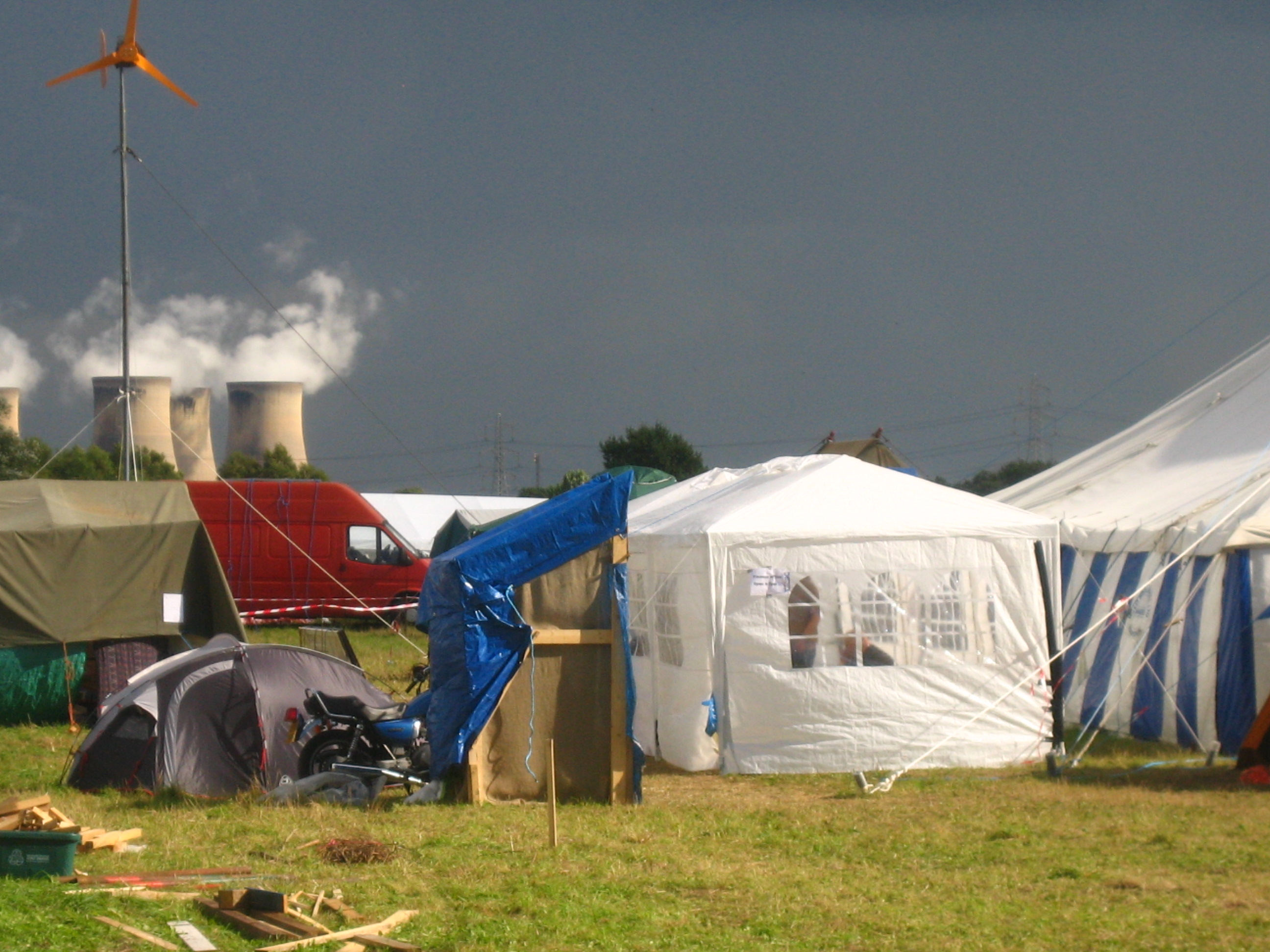
"Camp for Climate Action" (2006)

On 31 August 2006, over 600 people attended a protest against the high carbon emissions. It was coordinated by the Camp for Climate Action group. At least 3,000 police officers from 12 forces were reported to have been drafted in for the duration of the protest, to safeguard electricity supplies and prevent the protesters from shutting the station down. Thirty-nine people were arrested after trying illegally to gain access to the plant.

=== Train protest (2008) ===
At 8:00 am on 13 June 2008, more than 30 climate change campaigners halted an EWS coal train en route to the station by disguising themselves as rail workers by wearing high-visibility clothing and waving red flags. Stopping the train on a bridge across the River Aire, they scaled the wagons with the aid of the bridge's girders. They then mounted a banner reading "Leave it in the ground" on the side of the wagon and tied the train to the bridge, preventing it from moving. They then shovelled more than 20 tonnes of coal on to the railway line. The protest lasted the whole day, until several protesters were removed from the train by police that night. The station's management said that the protest had no effect on output. The action was coordinated by Camp for Climate Action.

=== Worker strike (2009) ===
On 18 June 2009, fewer than 200 contractors walked out of or failed to show up in a wildcat strike, showing solidarity with workers at the Lindsey Oil Refinery in Lincolnshire where 51 workers had been laid off while another employer on the site was recruiting more staff. A spokeswoman said the strike did not affect electricity output.

=== Biomass fires (2011, 2013) ===
In October 2011 a fire started by spontaneous combustion in a stockpile at the Port of Tyne biomass facility. Another fire occurred at the same facility in a conveyor transfer tower in October 2013.

== See also ==
- Aire valley power stations
- Energy use and conservation in the United Kingdom
- Energy policy of the United Kingdom
- List of power stations in England
- List of tallest buildings and structures in Great Britain
- Timeline of the UK electricity supply industry

Preceded by Longannet Power Station	Largest power station in the UK; 1986–present	Succeeded by Incumbent
