= RWE =

German multinational energy company

RWE AG
- Type: Aktiengesellschaft
- Traded as: FWB: RWE; FWB: RWEA (ADR); DAX component (RWE)
- ISIN: DE0007037129
- Industry: Electricity generation
- Founded: 25 April 1898
- Headquarters: Essen, Germany
- Area served: Asia-Pacific; Europe; United States
- Key people: Markus Krebber (president and CEO); Dr. Frank Appel (chairman of the supervisory board)
- Products: Electricity
- Revenue: €17.63 billion (2025)
- Operating income: €2.87 billion (2025)
- Net income: €3.13 billion (2025)
- Total assets: €10.33 billion (2025)
- Total equity: €10.27 billion (2025)
- Owner: Qatar Investment Authority (9.09%)
- Number of employees: 20,120 (2025)
- Website: www.group.rwe/en

RWE AG is a German multinational energy company headquartered in Essen. It generates and trades electricity in the Asia-Pacific region, Europe and the United States.

In July 2020, RWE completed an asset swap with E.ON, a transaction originally announced in 2018. Under the agreement, RWE acquired the renewable energy generation portfolios of both E.ON and Innogy. In exchange, RWE transferred its majority stake in Innogy, which included the distribution grid and retail businesses, to E.ON. RWE also acquired a 16.67% stake in E.ON as part of the deal. The restructuring resulted in RWE focusing on power generation and renewable energy, while E.ON consolidated its operations in energy networks and customer solutions.

== History ==
=== Pre-World War I ===
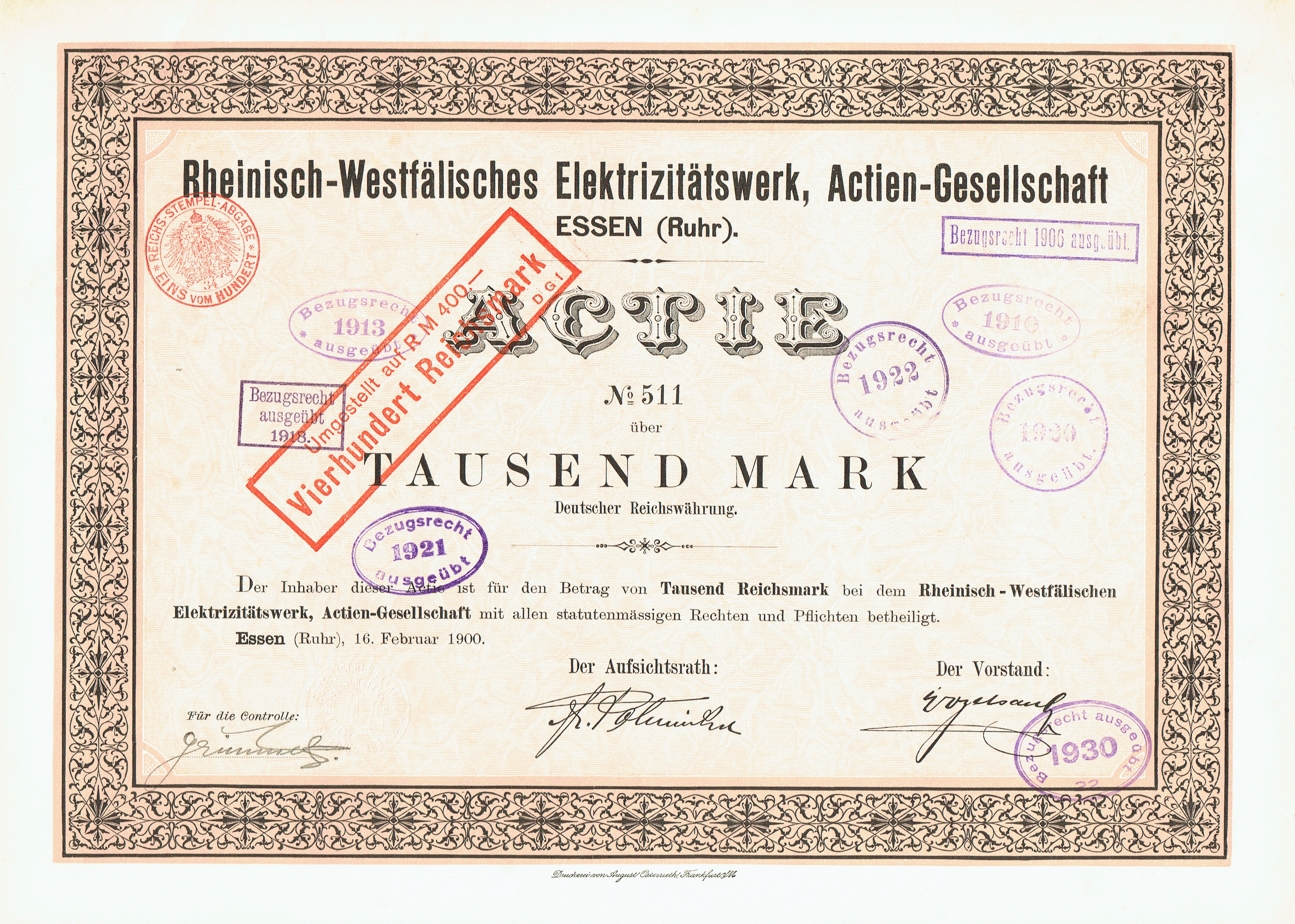
Share of the Rheinisch-Westfälische Elektrizitätswerk AG, issued 16 February 1900

The company was founded in Essen in 1898, as Rheinisch-Westfälisches Elektrizitätswerk Aktiengesellschaft (Rhenish-Westphalian Power Plant) by Elektrizitäts-Actien-Gesellschaft vorm. W. Lahmeyer & Company (EAG) and others. The full name was used until 1990 when it was renamed to RWE AG. Its first power station started operating in Essen in 1900. In 1902, EAG sold its shares to a consortium formed by Ruhr industrialists Hugo Stinnes and August Thyssen.

In 1906, it expanded its operations beyond Essen by acquiring Elektrizitätswerk Berggeist AG in Brühl, and Bergische Elektrizitätswerke GmbH, Solingen. During the same year, it also acquired shareholdings in the tramway companies Bochum-Gelsenkirchener Straßenbahn AG and Rheinische Bahngesellschaft AG.

In 1908, RWE signed demarcation contracts with Städtische Elektrizitätswerk Dortmund and Elektrizitätswerk Westfalen AG. Together they created Westfälische Verbands-Elektrizitätswerk AG. RWE contributed to the newly established company by its power station in Dortmund–Kruckel and the supply grid in Witten/Dortmund. Later all these companies formed Vereinigte Elektrizitätswerke Westfalen AG (VEW).

In 1909, RWE opened the Reisholz Power Plant and acquired a stake in the tram company Süddeutsche Eisenbahngesellschaft AG. RWE also started to build its own gas supply network in 1909. Deliveries of coal gas to the Bergisches Land region started in 1912. In 1914, RWE opened Vorgebirgszentrale power plant in Hürth. By 1920, the plant had installed capacity of 190 megawatts, which made it the largest in Europe.

Before World War I, municipalities of Essen, Mülheim an der Ruhr, and Gelsenkirchen, became shareholders in RWE. By the 1920s, Bonn, Cologne, Krefeld, Duisburg, and Düsseldorf also became shareholders and municipalities owned the majority of RWE's shares. In 1925, the Prussian state became a shareholder in RWE. In 1929, municipalities and the Rhine Province combined their shareholdings into a holding company Kommunale Aufnahmegruppe für Aktien GmbH.

=== Interwar years and World War II ===
In 1920, RWE acquired Niedersächsische Kraftwerke AG, located in Osnabrück. In 1922, it expanded its coal business by acquiring three anthracite mines in Essen and a majority stake in the lignite company Braunkohlen- und Briketwerke Roddergrube AG. In 1923, it acquired its founder company EAG. Three years later, the company acquired a stake in Rheinische Elektrizitäts-Aktiengesellschaft (Rheinelektra) and became a shareholder in the newly established Ruhrgas gas company in exchange of its gas grid. In 1927, RWE and Prussia swapped their holdings in the Brunswick and Cologne coalfields and RWE became an owner of Braunkohlen-Industrie AG Zukunft.

In 1932, RWE acquired a majority stake in the coal company Rheinische Aktiengesellschaft für Braunkohlenbergbau (Rheinbraun). In 1936, it acquired Niederrheinische Braunkohlenwerke AG, an operator of the Frimmersdorf Power Plant.

On 1 May 1933, the executive board including Ernst Henke joined the NSDAP as a unified body.

Since autumn 1943, the Essen state police had been investigating Wilhelm Ricken, RWE's technical director and designated general director, for "subversion of the military". The then First Mayor of Essen, Just Dillgardt, who was also second chairman of RWE's supervisory board, had reported Ricken to the state police. Previously, he had received a tip from the then commercial director and fellow board member of Ricken, Friedrich Praedel. This "board member" of RWE is said to have pushed Dillgardt to press charges. Wilhelm Ricken was then arrested on 20 October 1943, and sentenced to death on 8 March 1944, by the Volksgerichtshof (People's Court), partly because of his statement that "the war would end like 1918". On 2 May 1944, Wilhelm Ricken was executed in Berlin-Plötzensee.

In 2015, a "stumbling block" was placed at this final address in Essen to commemorate Ricken's fate.

=== Developments since World War II ===
During World War II, the infrastructure owned by RWE was severely damaged but mostly repaired by 1948. In 1952, the company was excluded from the Allies' control. In 1957, RWE acquired the coal company Neurath AG.

RWE and the Bavarian state-owned 'Bayernwerk' joined forces to build Germany's first industrial nuclear reactor. The Kahl experimental nuclear power plant (15 megawatts), constructed right next to RWE's Dettingen hard coal-fired power plant, supplied its first electricity in 1962. Until its closure in 1985, this plant would serve as a source of important findings which supported the design and operation of commercial nuclear reactors.

RWE's nuclear operations started in 1961, when RWE and Bayernwerk (now part of E.ON) started to build the first German industrial nuclear reactor—the Kahl Nuclear Power Plant. In 1962, they started to build the Gundremmingen Nuclear Power Plant. In 1965, at the request of the surrounding municipalities, the Karnap power plant in Essen started to burn domestic waste.

In 1969, RWE acquired a stake in Gelsenkirchener Bergwerks-Aktiengesellschaft which allowed its expansion into the oil industry. However, in 1974, it was sold to VEBA AG.

In 1971, founded Gesellschaft für elektrischen Straßenverkehr, a company to develop an electric car for commercial scale production. The prototype presented in 1983 was produced in cooperation with Volkswagen and named City-Stromer.

In 1988, RWE again expanded into the oil industry by acquiring Deutsche Texaco, formerly known as Deutsche Erdoel AG, which was renamed RWE-DEA AG für Mineralöl und Chemie (RWE-DEA). RWE was reorganized to hold energy, mining and raw materials; petroleum and chemicals; waste management; mechanical and plant engineering; and construction divisions.

In the 1990s, RWE acquired a number of assets in the former East Germany, including stakes in the mining company Lausitzer Braunkohle AG (LAUBAG) and the power company VEAG. In 2000, RWE and VEW merged to create a "new" RWE, and stakes in LAUBAG and VEAG (now both merged into Vattenfall Europe) were sold to avoid competition violation.

In 2001, RWE took over the British company Thames Water. In 2002, it acquired American Water Works Company, based in New Jersey, which became a subsidiary of Thames Water. In 2006, RWE sold Thames Water to Kemble Water Limited, a consortium led by Macquarie Group. RWE previously owned American Water, the United States' largest investor-owned water utility, but this was divested in 2008.

In 2002, RWE acquired the British electricity and gas utility company Innogy for £3 billion (US$4.3 billion). Innogy was subsequently renamed RWE npower plc.

As a result of the assets swap with RAG AG, RWE gave away its stake in the power company STEAG. It received almost full control of the renewable energy company Harpen AG. The full control of Harpen was achieved in 2005. In 2003, RWE also achieved full control over Thyssengas. In the same year, it decided to divest its American coal company Consol Energy.

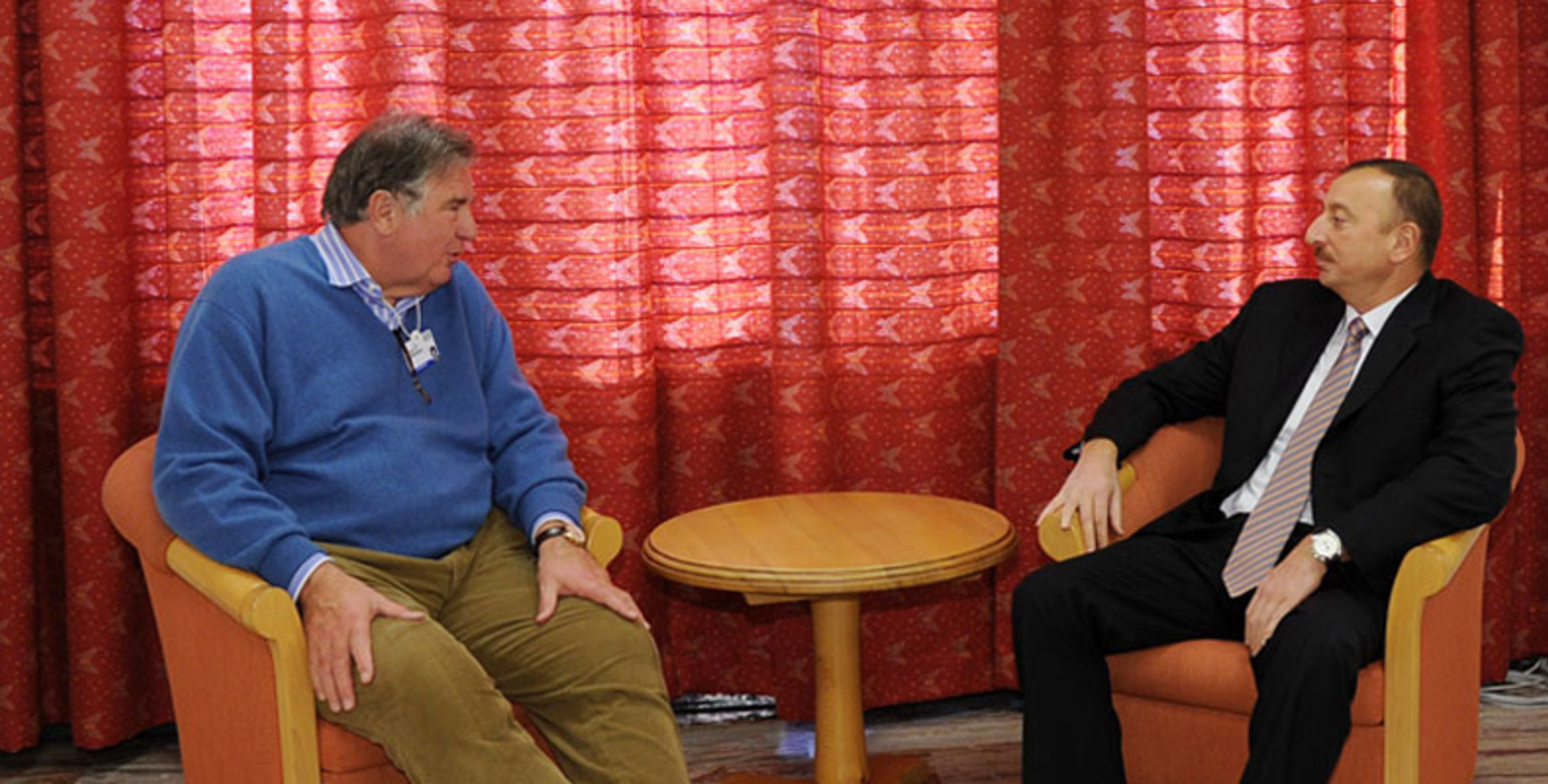
RWE CEO Jürgen Großmann meeting with Azerbaijan's President Ilham Aliyev in 2011

In 2011, RWE unbundled its transmission system by selling its majority stake in the transmission system operator Amprion (RWE Transportnetz Strom GmbH), but keeping 25.1% in the company.

On 14 August 2012, RWE AG announced that the company would cut 2,400 more jobs to reduce costs. Previously the company had announced to eliminate 5,000 jobs and 3,000 jobs through divestments as anticipated of closing all nuclear reactors by 2022.

In August 2013, RWE completed the disposal of NET4GAS, the Czech gas transmission network operator, for €1.6 billion to a consortium consisting of Allianz and Borealis. The company (named Transgas A.S. then) was privatized to RWE in 2002. In the 2000s, RWE also acquired energy companies in Poland (STOEN S.A.) and Slovenia (VSE a.s).

It also owned RWE Dea (now DEA AG), which produced some of the oil and gas RWE sold (annual production is around 2 million m^{3} of crude oil (about 365,000 BOE) and 3 billion m^{3} of natural gas (about 18 million BOE, 49,300 BOE) a day. In March 2015, RWE closed the sale of RWE Dea to a group led by Russian billionaire Mikhail Fridman despite opposition from UK regulators. The $5.6 billion deal, announced in 2014, required approval from 14 countries where RWE Dea operates in Europe, the Middle East and Africa.

On 1 April 2016, RWE transferred its renewable, network and retail businesses into a separate company named Innogy, which is listed at the Frankfurt Stock Exchange. The new entity combined RWE subsidiaries RWE Innogy, RWE Deutschland, RWE Effizienz, RWE Vertrieb and RWE Energiedienstleistungen.

In March 2018, it was announced that E.ON will acquire Innogy in a complex €43 billion deal of assets swap with RWE. As a result, RWE will take a 16.7% stake in E.ON. Following the purchase of E.ON's renewables business and nuclear electricity generation assets, RWE is expected to become Europe's third-largest renewable energy provider behind Spain's Iberdrola and Italy's Enel, and the second-largest in the market for offshore wind power.

On 1 December 2023, it was agreed that RWE would be part of an £11 billion investment in the UK's Dogger Bank wind farm project.

The German government received EU approval in late 2023 for a €2.6 billion compensation payment to RWE to phase out lignite in the Rhine region. No details of the deal, or its timing, have been released.

== Financial data ==
Financial data in €
Year	Revenue	Net income (€ millions)	Dividend per share (€)	Employees
2013	54,070			66,341
2014	48,468			61,715
2015	48,599			59,350
2016	45,833			59,073
2017	44,585			59,333
2018	13,406			17,748
2019	13,125	−660		19,792
2020	13,896	1,051		19,630
2021	24,761	721	0.85	18,867
2022	38,366	2,717	0.90	18,310
2023	28,566	1,450	1.90	20,315
2024	25,650	1,840	1.10	20,985
2025	26,210	1,910	1.20 (e)	20,120

== Operations ==
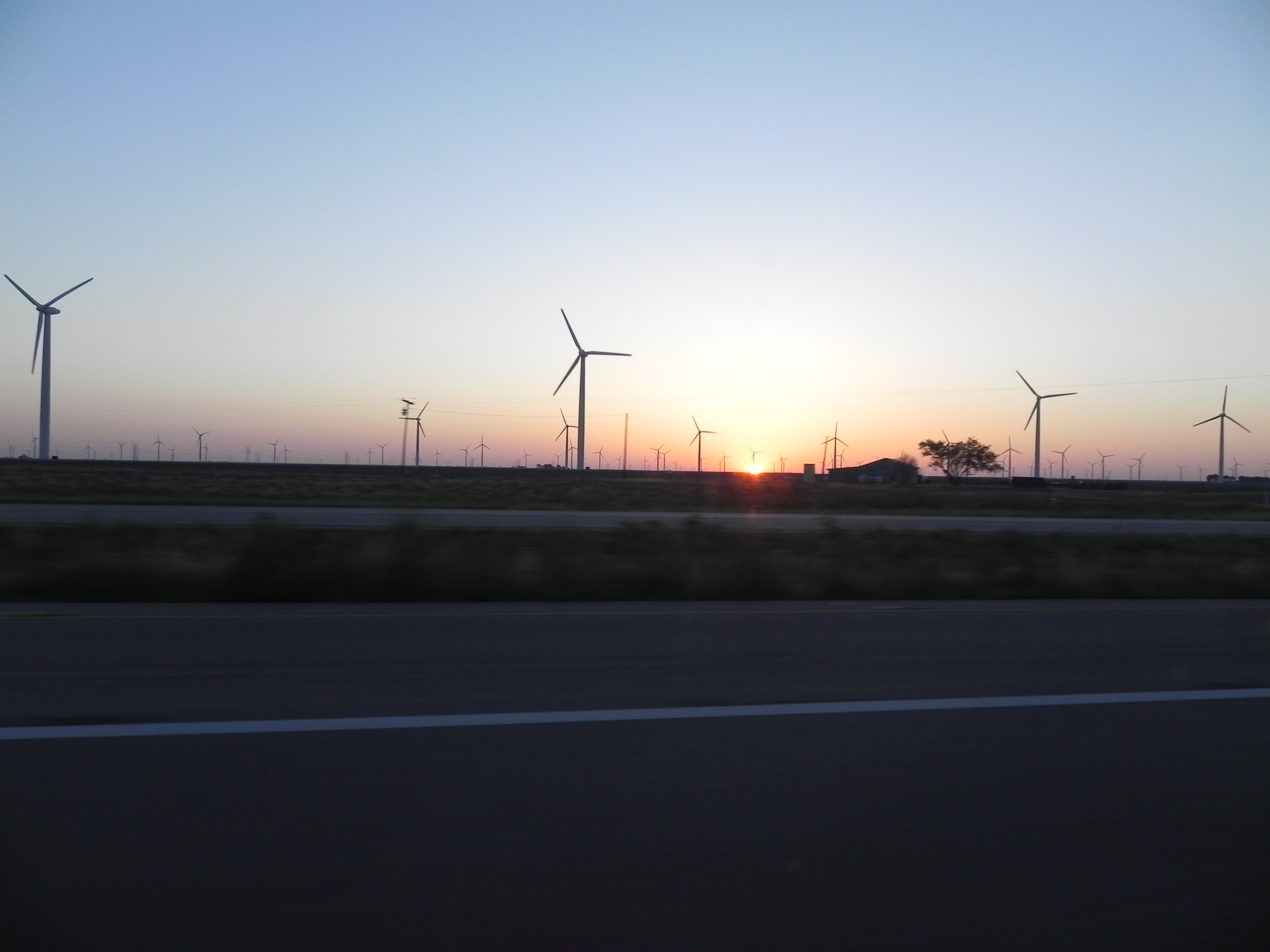
RWE-owned Roscoe Wind Farm in Texas, US

RWE operates in Asia-Pacific, Europe and the United States. The group is organized around four core areas:

- Offshore Wind
- Onshore Wind/Solar
- Hydro/Biomass/Gas
- Supply & Trading

In addition to these core areas, there is a Coal/Nuclear segment.

In the UK, RWE fully owns RWE Generation UK plc., which operates a number of natural gas and renewable energy power stations across the UK. RWE's last coal-fired power station in the UK, Aberthaw Power Station in South Wales, was closed in March 2020. The company owns the gas-fired power stations Staythorpe in Nottinghamshire, Pembroke in West Wales, Little Barford in Bedfordshire, Great Yarmouth in Norfolk, and Didcot 'B' Station in Oxfordshire. It has previously closed its Didcot 'A' Power Station in Oxfordshire, Littlebrook Power Station in Kent, Fawley Power Station in Hampshire, and Tilbury Power Station in Essex.

RWE jointly owns one third of the Urenco Group with E.ON. The remaining stakes are held by the British and Dutch governments, with one-third each.

== Fuel mix disclosure ==
In 2019, RWE produced a total of 153.2 TWh of electricity from the following sources: 33.2% natural gas, 32% lignite, 13.8% nuclear power, 10.7% renewables, 9.3% hard coal and 1.2% pumped storage. In 2019, the company generated 88.1 Mt of CO_{2.} Electricity production at RWE had the following environmental implications in 2006: 784 g/kWh CO_{2} emissions. In 2007, the company ranked between the 28th and the 29th place of emitters by country.

== Criticism and controversies ==
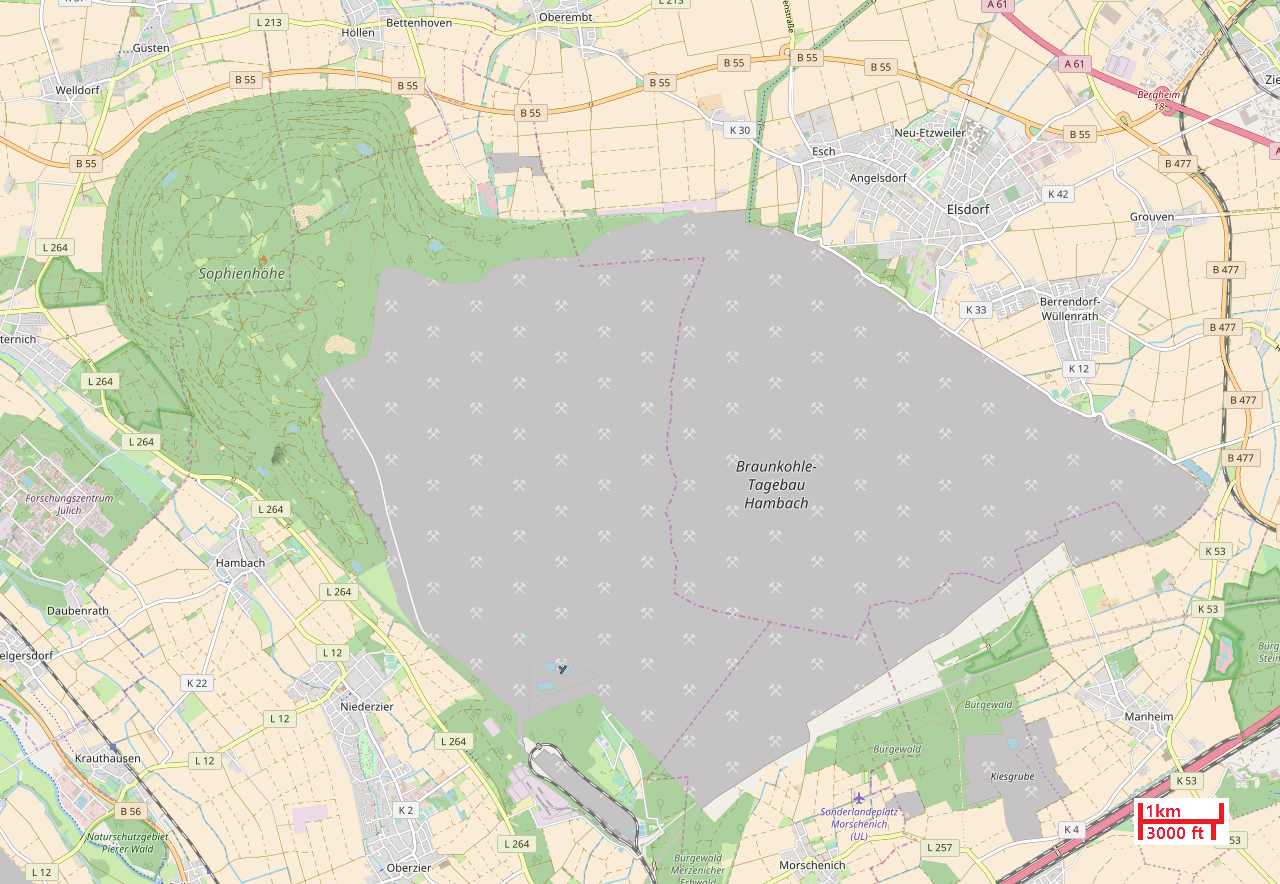
Hambach surface mine (grey); remaining and occupied Hambach Forest more southern (northeast of Morschenich)

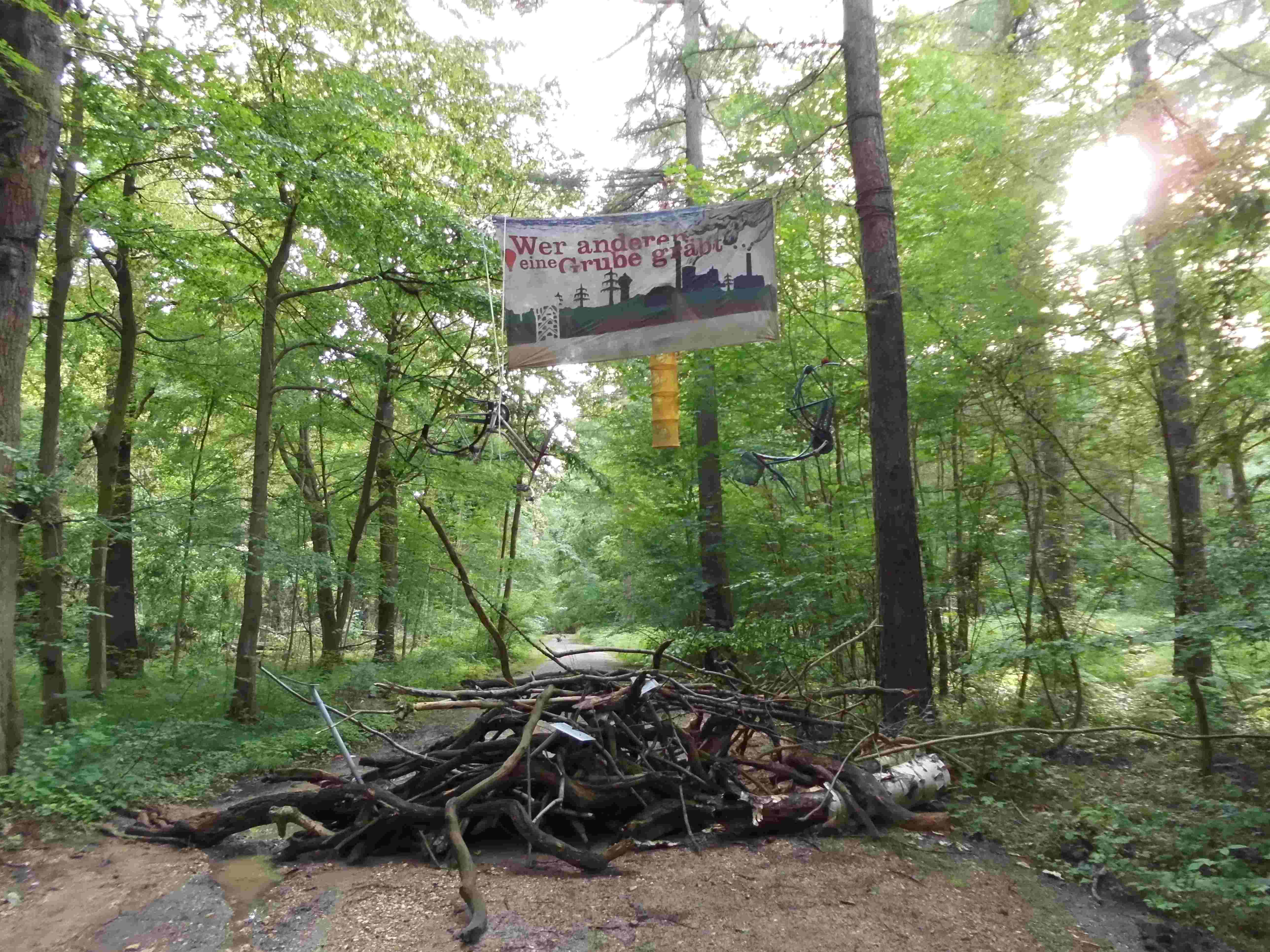
Barricade

RWE has long been among the top targets of climate activists, in part as a result of a long-running, high-profile battle to preserve a forest in western Germany that is threatened by the planned expansion of one of the group's coal mines. RWE also operates some of the largest coal-fired power stations in Europe.

In 2018, RWE was the largest producer of carbon dioxide emissions in Europe.

Since 2012, environmentalists have protested against RWE because of the Hambach surface mine situated in the area of Hambach Forest. In November 2017, in the lawsuit filed by Bund für Umwelt und Naturschutz Deutschland (BUND), the German arm of Friends of the Earth, the Higher Administrative Court in Münster ruled to end the tree cutting. According to BUND, Hambach Forest is a habitat type 9160 of annex I of the European Habitats Directive (Council Directive 92/43/EEC of 21 May 1992).

Opponents also argue that an environmental impact assessment study for the mine was never conducted. The Administrative Court in Cologne denied the necessity of such a study in November 2017, because the permission for the mining operations was given in the 1970s, long before environmental impact assessment studies became mandatory. In October 2018, an estimated 50,000 protesters turned out against the company's planned continued forest clear-cutting for its open-pit coal mine expansion while a court order delayed the process until at least late 2020, to explore if it violated EU environmental regulations.

In September 2021, it was revealed that RWE are among a number of fossil fuel companies suing governments for enacting green policies against climate change. RWE are suing the Dutch government for $1.6bn following their move to phase out and shut down coal power plants.

== Sponsorship ==
Between 2000 and 2007, RWE was the main kit sponsor of German Bundesliga club Bayer 04 Leverkusen.

== See also ==
- Gesellschaft für Nuklear-Service
- Rheinisches Braunkohlerevier
- Lützerath bleibt!
