= Large Combustion Plant Directive =

The Large Combustion Plant Directive (LCPD, 2001/80/EC) is a European Union directive which required member states of the European Union to legislatively limit flue gas emissions from combustion plant having thermal capacity of 50 MW or greater.

== Directive ==
The directive applied to fossil-fuel power stations, and other large thermal plants such as petroleum refineries and steelworks. The directive specified emission limits for sulphur dioxide, nitrogen oxides, and dust. The directive was issued in October 2001. It replaced the earlier EEC directive on large combustion plants, 88/609/EEC, issued in November 1988.

Under the terms of the directive, combustion plants built after 1987 had to comply with specific emissions limits. From 2007, plants built earlier than that could either opt to comply with the emissions limits, or "opt out". Plants which had opted out were limited to a maximum of 20,000 hours of further operation, and had to close completely by the end of 2015. Across Europe, 205 plants have opted out, with Britain having the largest proportion of opted-out plants in terms of total capacity.

The Large Combustion Plant Directive was superseded by the Industrial Emissions Directive on 1 January 2016.

== UK opted-out plants ==
The nine opted-out generating stations supplying the National Grid were:

Station	Generating capacity (MW)	Closure date
Grain	1,300	December 2012
Kingsnorth	1,940	December 2012
Didcot 'A'	1,940	March 2013
Cockenzie	1,152	March 2013
Fawley	990	March 2013
Ferrybridge	980 (half)	March 2014
Ironbridge	970	20 November 2015
Tilbury	1,037	August 2013
Littlebrook	1,245	March 2015
Total	11,550	

Opted-out plants exist at four other sites; however, only certain plants at these sites opted-out.

- Ballylumford power station,
- boilers 15 & 16 at Slough Heat & Power Ltd,
- boiler 3 at BP's Coryton Refinery, Stanford-le-Hope
- an E.ON site at Workington
