= Tilbury power stations =

Thermal power stations in Essex, England

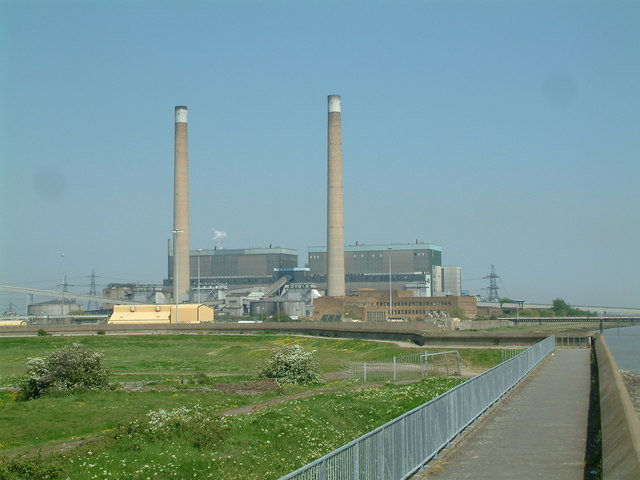
- Tilbury B Power Station; Viewed from the west in May 2008
- Country: England
- Location: Tilbury
- Coordinates: 51.454926°N 0.391677°E
- Status: Decommissioned and demolished
- Construction began: A station: 1951; B station: 1961
- Commission date: A station: 1956; B station: 1968
- Decommission date: A station: 1981; B station: 2013
- Owners: Central Electricity Authority (1955–1957); Central Electricity Generating Board (1958–1990); National Power (1990–2000); Innogy plc (2000–2002) npower (2002–2013)
- Operator: CEGB 1958-1990

Thermal power station
- Primary fuel: Coal
- Secondary fuel: Oil
- Tertiary fuel: Biomass
- Site area: 91.5 hectare
- Chimneys: A station: 2 (100 metres); B station: 2 (168 metres)
- Cooling towers: None
- Cooling source: River water

Power generation
- Units operational: A station: 6 × 60 MW; B station: 4 × 350 MW
- Units decommissioned: All
- Nameplate capacity: A station: 360 MW; B station: 1,428 MW
- Annual net output: A station: 2662 MWh max; B station: 4587 MWh max

External links
- Website: web.archive.org/web/20100518173833/http://www.rwe.com/web/cms/en/97606/rwe-npower/about-us/our-businesses/power-generation/tilbury/
- Commons: Related media on Commons

The Tilbury power stations were two thermal power stations on the north bank of the River Thames at Tilbury in Essex. The 360 MW dual coal- and oil-fired Tilbury A Power Station operated from 1956 until 1981 when it was mothballed, prior to demolition in 1999. The 1,428 MW Tilbury B Power Station operated between 1968 and 2013 and was fueled by coal, as well as co-firing with oil and, from 2011, biomass. Tilbury B was demolished in 2016–19. Since 2013 three other power stations have been proposed or constructed in Tilbury.

== History ==
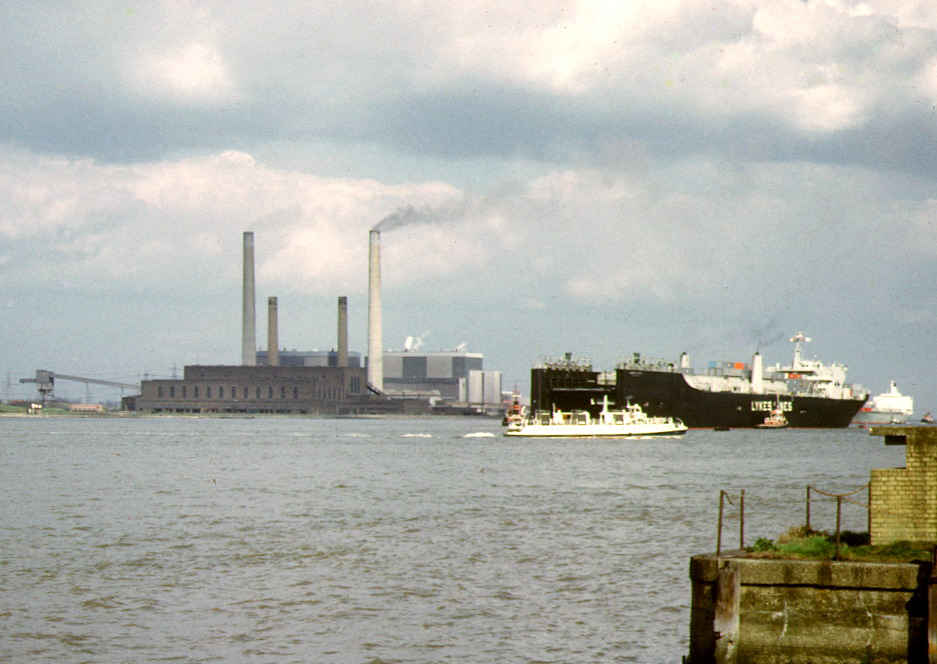
Tilbury A and B stations in 1973

=== A station ===
Tilbury A power station was planned from 1947 by the County of London Electricity Supply Company Limited. Following the nationalisation of the electricity industry in 1948 the plans were taken forward successively by the British Electricity Authority, the Central Electricity Authority and from 1958 the Central Electricity Generating Board. Construction of Tilbury A was sanctioned in 1950 and began in 1951 and was initially commissioned in 1956 by the Central Electricity Authority.

It was officially opened on Friday 6 June 1958 by Sir Francis Whitmore, and cost £18m.

After operating for 25 years the A station was mothballed by the CEGB in 1981 and eventually demolished in 1999, mostly everything including the turbine hall was demolished. The waste water and a small part of the station remained due to being a listed building The site was entirely cleared in 2019 for the construction of the Tilbury2 port.

=== B station ===
The CEGB began construction of the larger 1,428 MW Tilbury B station in 1961. This was commissioned in 1968 and was operating at full capacity by 1969. On privatisation of the electricity industry in 1990 it was assigned to National Power, and was later operated by RWE npower.

==== Conversion to biomass ====
In May 2011, RWE began converting the B station to burn biomass only. They hoped the conversion would allow 750 MW of electricity to be generated from burning wood pellets imported from a pelleting plant in Georgia, USA, and other sources from Europe by the winter of 2011. This conversion made the station the biggest biomass generating site in the world.

In July 2013 RWE npower announced they were halting the conversion due to difficulty in converting and financing the plant. It was mothballed after failing to receive a government grant and was decommissioned and subsequently demolished during 2016–9.

=== C station ===
In early 2007, Npower announced plans to replace the B station with a 1,600 MW 'cleaner' coal-fired power station. The station would have cost £1 billion to build and was hoped to be operational by 2014. The plans were supported by the Port of London Authority. RWE had also planned to build a clean coal power station at Blyth but they have since postponed both schemes.

== Design and specification ==
=== A station ===
Sir Alexander Gibb and Partners were the civil consulting engineers and architects of Tilbury A; the main consulting engineers were Merz & McLellan. The A station was built on the 226 acre (91.5 hectare) site and was a steel framed construction with elevations in London stock brick. The integrated boiler house and turbine hall were lit by tall rectangular windows, with ancillary buildings by smaller square windows. The A station had two 100 metre high concrete chimneys.

The installation consisted of six 540,000 lb/hr pulverised fuel boilers each connected to a 11.6 kV 60 MW turbo-alternator three were manufactured by English Electric and three by Parsons giving a total output of 360 MW. The steam pressure and temperature at the turbine stop-valve was 900 psi (62 bar) and 482 °C. It was designed as a coal-fired station with coal delivered to a 700 ft jetty on the Thames and stored initially to the East and later to the North of the building but soon after completion in 1958 the station was adapted to also burn oil. Cooling water was drawn from, and returned to, the Thames via caissons in the fueling jetty. The station connected to the National Grid at the nearby 132 kV Tilbury substation. Tilbury A had several railway sidings accessed via a connection to the London, Tilbury and Southend railway between the former Tilbury Riverside and Low Street railway stations.

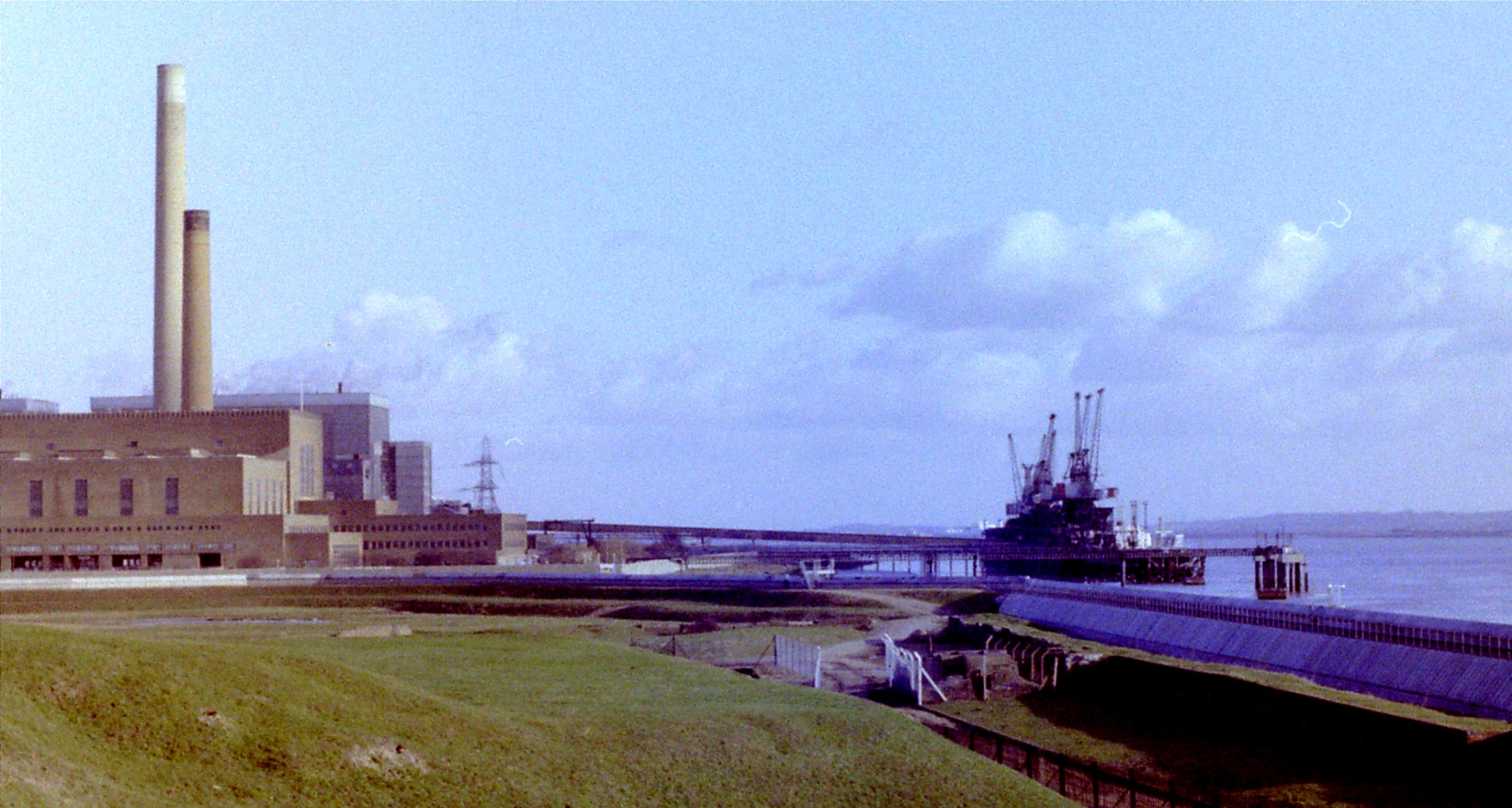
Tilbury A and B power stations and coaling jetty 1981

In 1963 Tilbury A was used in experiments by the CEGB on the behaviour of pollutants (principally sulphur dioxide) in flue gas plumes emitted from the power station chimneys. The results showed that the maximum pollutant concentrations occurred 2.4 km downwind of the station in strong winds and 9.6 – 13 km downwind in light winds.

=== B station ===
The B station was built on the site of coal store to the east of the A station; the coal store for both stations was then relocated to the north of the site. The B station was a steel framed construction with unfenestrated elevations of concrete cladding. The taller boiler house block was orientated north–south to the west of the adjoining turbine hall; control rooms and offices were at the south end.

Tilbury B comprised four generating units each of 350 MW. When all four units were available the combined output capacity was 1428 MW, enough power for 1.4 million people, approximately 80% of the population of Essex. The boiler steam pressure was 158.58 bar at a temperature of 566 °C. Discharge from the HP turbine was returned to the boilers for reheat to 566 °C. The boilers had a capacity of 4 × 296 kg/s. The station had two 168 metre high concrete chimneys. One unit was later decommissioned and was used for spare parts for maintenance of the remaining 3 generating units.

In addition to the steam generating sets Tilbury power station had auxiliary gas turbines for peak-shaving. This comprised four 17.5 MW gas turbines, the oldest set was commissioned in February 1965.

Two 800 tonne coal unloaders were installed on the jetty in 1990. The jetty was enlarged in 2004 to accommodate ships carrying up to 65,000 tons of coal.

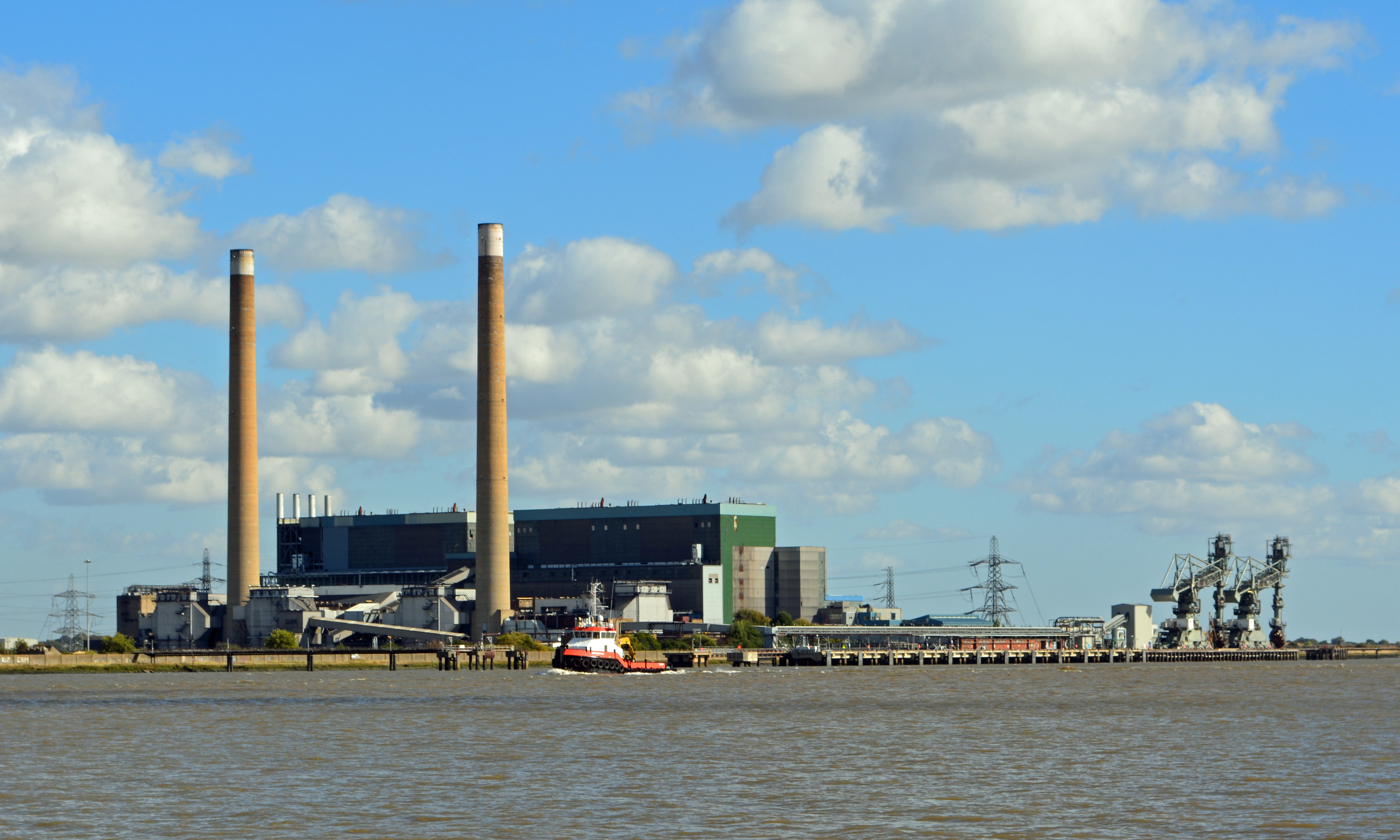
Decommissioned Tilbury B power station seen from Gravesend

== Electricity output ==
Electricity output for Tilbury A & B stations over the period 1957-1987 was as follows.

Tilbury A annual electricity output GWh
Tilbury B annual electricity output GWh

The steam turbo-alternators of B station were not commissioned until 1968; the output of B station before this date was from the gas-turbine sets commissioned in February 1965.

The maximum thermal efficiency of the A station was 30.84%; and for the B station was 32.19%.

== Incidents ==
=== 1977 fire ===
In the early hours of 16 November 1977 a fire broke out at Tilbury B. It spread from the control room along cable ducts and caused severe cracks in the £70 million building. The site was evacuated but three engineers who had stayed behind to shut down the plant were taken to hospital after inhaling fumes. Foam equipment was brought from other power stations and by the evening the fire had been contained.

=== 2008 boiler incident ===
On 1 July 2008, an engineer servicing an offline boiler at the station fell 20 ft (6.1 m) from scaffolding into the boiler. Crews used an internal staircase in the boiler to rescue him.

=== 2009 fire ===
A fire broke out at the power station on 29 July 2009 shortly after 3 pm, with the failure of one of the station's high-pressure turbine units. Workers were evacuated immediately and the fire was reported to be under control by 5:30 pm. There were no casualties.

=== 2012 fire ===
A major fire broke out in a fuel storage area of the station on the morning of 27 February 2012. Essex County Fire and Rescue Service mobilised over 120 firefighters to the fire, which involved some 4,000 to 6,000 tonnes of fuel in storage cells, two of which were described as "well alight".

Essex Chief Fire Officer David Johnson reported that firefighting operations were hindered by the fact that the blaze was high up in the main structure of the station, which was also heavily smoke-logged. In addition to 15 pumping appliances, crews used three aerial ladder platforms, one major rescue tender, three bulk foam tenders and a thermal-imaging camera in a helicopter to help tackle the fire. Support crews were drafted in from the London Fire Brigade.

Despite initial reports, another fire in the adjacent Tilbury docks which started around the same time was not connected to the larger blaze at the power station. It took firefighters several hours to bring the power station fire under control, and relief crews remained at the site for days afterward dousing and removing embers.

=== Chimneys and power station demolition ===
The chimneys of the B station were demolished on 28 September 2017.

In March 2019, the 14th and final explosive demolition took place.

== Ash disposal site ==
Ash from the boilers at Tilbury power station was deposited on the low lying marshland to the east of the site. The land at Goshems Farm East Tilbury had also been subject to other landfill activity over the years and the fill comprised a mixture of ash and glass bottles. The site had been poorly restored and had little topsoil cover and was uneven and littered with debris. In 2003 a plan was inaugurated to restore the site. This would entail raising the height of the land using soil from civil engineering works along the River Thames and restore the site to high quality arable farmland. Inert construction material is transported in barges to the wharf at Goshems Farm. The first barge was unloaded in 2011 and the restoration works are ongoing. A public footpath will be created along the riverside. Tilbury Ash Disposal Site is operated by Ingrebourne Valley Ltd.

== Other power stations in Tilbury ==
In addition to Tilbury A and B there are three other power stations in Tilbury that are planned or are now operational.

=== Tilbury Energy Centre ===
The Tilbury Energy Centre is a planned natural gas Combined Cycle Gas Turbine (CCGT) power station which also includes a peaking plant and a battery energy storage unit. The centre is owned and will be operated by RWE Generation UK plc. It is located on the site of the demolished Tilbury B power station.

The Tilbury Energy Centre will comprise three gas-fired CCGT generating units with a total output capacity of 2500 MW; a 300 MW peaking plant comprising open cycle gas turbines (OCGT); and batteries with a capacity of 100 MW. The centre will also have the capability to act as a combined heat and power facility and will be provided with carbon capture readiness capability.

The flue stacks of the CCGT will be 95 metres in height and the OCGT stack(s) will 45 metres high.

In November 2018 RWE evaluated its UK energy options and decided to freeze the Tilbury Energy Centre development.

=== Thurrock Flexible Generation Plant ===
The Thurrock Flexible Generation Plant is a planned natural gas engine and battery energy electricity supply facility. The plant will be developed, owned and operated by Thurrock Power Limited, a subsidiary of Statera Energy. It is located immediately north of the former Tilbury A & B power station site and south of the London, Tilbury and Southend Railway. The main site occupies an area of 18.5 hectares.

The plant will comprise up to 60 fast-starting gas engines fuelled by natural gas connected to electricity generators which will generate a total of 600 MW of electricity. In addition, batteries will store up to 600 MWh and export up to 150 MW of electricity. The engines will not run continuously but will start up for short periods several times a day as the National Grid requires, it is envisaged that they will run for up to 4000 hours per year, i.e. less than half the year. Electrical transformers and switchgear step-up the voltage from the batteries and generators to match the 275 kV National Grid voltage at Tilbury substation.

The flue stacks from the engines may be grouped together; the stacks will be 40 metres tall. The engine building will be 20 metres high and the battery building up to 10 metres high.

It is envisaged that advance works will start in 2020; main construction work will start in 2021 and take 18 months to six years in total over several phases. The plant will have a design operational life of 35 years.

By 2025, 450 MW gas-powered backup runs occasionally. A 600 MWh / 300 MW grid battery tests reactive power service.

=== Tilbury Green Power ===
The Tilbury Green Power plant is an operational electricity generating facility which uses wood as a fuel source. The plant is owned and operated by Tilbury Green Power Limited. The plant is located within the Port of Tilbury, Essex. There are two phases of development: Phase 1 is a 40 MW waste wood power plant; and Phase 2 is a 20 MW Solid Recovered Fuel power plant. Only Phase 1 has currently been developed; construction started in August 2015 and the plant was commissioned in early 2019.

The plant utilises about 270,000 tonnes of waste wood to produce up to 319,000 MWh of renewable electricity each year. Wood is processed onsite to produce wood-chip which is burned in a single travelling grate boiler to produce high pressure steam. This steam passes through a single steam turbine to generate electricity. Electricity (at 132 kV) is supplied to the National Grid via a 4.5 km underground cable to the existing 132 kV substation at Tilbury.

Flue gases from the boiler are treated by emissions control technology including Selective Non-Catalytic Reduction (SNCR), fabric filters, and dry lime and activated carbon injection. Exhaust gases are discharged via a 100 metre high stack.
