= National Power =

British energy company (1990–2001)

- Type: Public
- Industry: Energy
- Founded: 1990
- Defunct: 2001
- Fate: demerged into Innogy and International Power
- Successor: Innogy; International Power
- Headquarters: London, England
- Products: Gas and Electricity

National Power was an energy company based in the United Kingdom.

== History ==
National Power was formed following the privatisation of the UK electricity market in 1990. In England and Wales the Central Electricity Generating Board, which was responsible for the generation and transmission of electricity, was split into four companies. Its generation (or upstream) activities were transferred to three generating companies, National Power, Nuclear Electric and PowerGen, and its transmission (or downstream) activities to the National Grid Company.

National Power was the largest of these new companies having around 52 percent of the generating market. It later diversified into the supply market in November 1998 by purchasing the supply business of the regional electricity company Midlands Electricity and created the Npower supply brand.

On 2 October 2000 following investor pressure the company demerged into two separate companies Innogy, which was responsible for the UK based operations, and International Power, which took over the international operations. Innogy is now known as Npower. It was owned by RWE until 2019, when it became part of E.ON UK, while International Power is owned by Engie.
