= Head of tide =

Furthest point upstream where a river is affected by tidal fluctuations

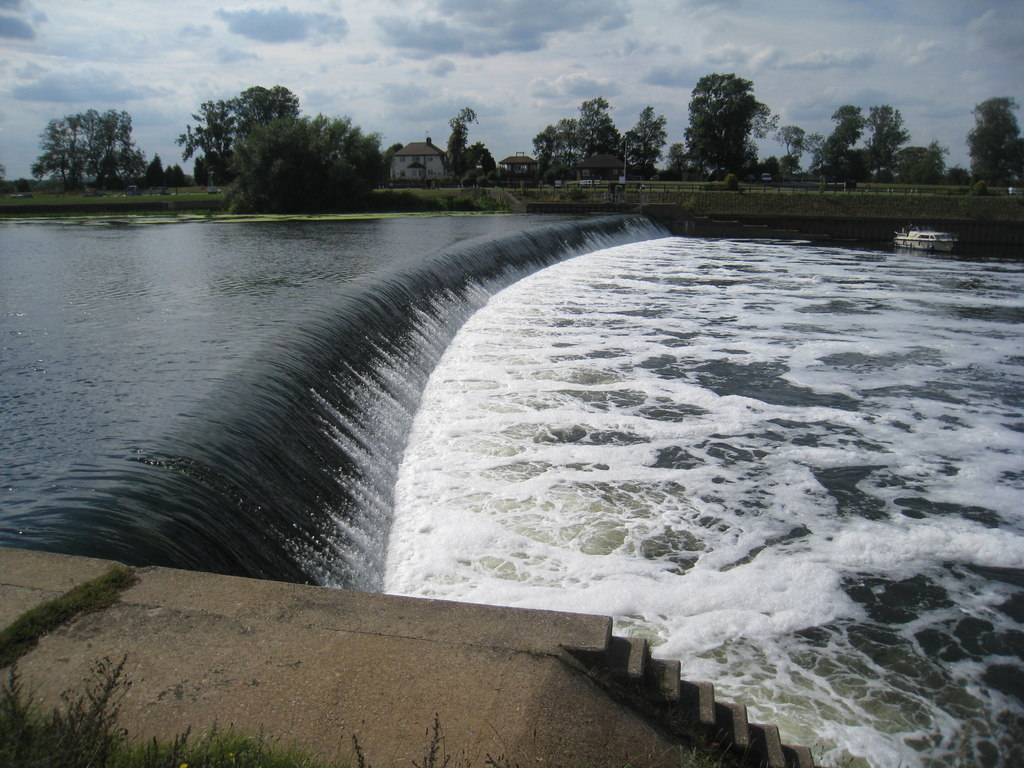
Cromwell Weir marks the tidal limit of the River Trent, a major river in England

Head of tide, tidal limit or tidehead is the furthest point upstream where a river is affected by tidal fluctuations, or where the fluctuations are less than a certain amount. The river section influenced by tides and marine forces, but without salinity is a tidal river. Downstream areas are brackish and termed estuaries.

Although this point may vary due to storms, spring tides, and seasonal or annual differences in water flows, there is generally an average point that is accepted as the head of tide (in Great Britain this is the Normal Tidal Limit, typically noted on Ordnance Survey maps as 'NTL'). The head of tide is important in surveying, navigation, and fisheries management, and thus many jurisdictions establish a legal head of tide. As the head of tide is useful for navigation, separate maps can be made of the tidal zones up to the head of tide, such as was done in New Jersey.

The head of tide may be many miles upstream from the river's mouth. For example, on the Hudson River, it is located 140 miles (225 km) upstream, near Albany, New York. On the Saint Lawrence River, tides affect the river up to Lake St. Pierre.

== See also ==
- Tidal bore
- Tidewater (region)
- The Tideway
- Mean high water
