= River Swarbourn =

River in Staffordshire, England

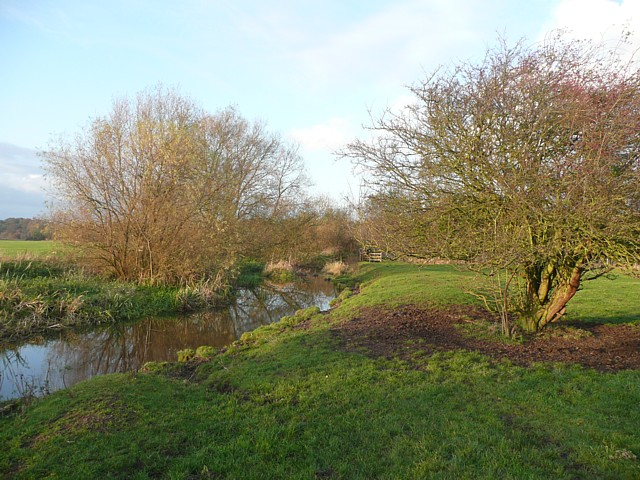

- Location within Staffordshire

Location
- Country: England
- Counties: Staffordshire

Physical characteristics
- Source
  - location: Marchington Woodlands
- Mouth
  - location: Between Wychnor Park and Alrewas
  - coordinates: 52.74133°N 1.75906°W
- Length: 16 km (9.9 mi)
- Basin size: 48 km^{2} (19 sq mi)

Basin features
- Tributaries
  - left: Eland Brook, Mare Brook, Lin Brook

The River Swarbourn is a minor tributary of the River Trent that flows for 10 miles (16 km) in Staffordshire, England.

== Geography ==
Its catchment lies between that of the River Blithe to the West, and the River Dove to the north, in a part of the county known as Needwood Forest. The Swarbourn and its tributaries, which include the Eland Brook, Mare brook and Lin Brook, drain a catchment area of 48 square kilometres (19 mi^{2}).

The source is near to the village of Marchington Woodlands, it flows southeast, and passes through Newborough, Hoar Cross, Woodmill, and Yoxall until it joins the River Trent between Wychnor Park and Alrewas.

The Staffordshire long-distance footpath called the Way for the Millennium follows the Swarbourn from Yoxall to its confluence with the Trent.

== Ecology ==
The Swarbourn has been classed as having moderate ecological quality under the Water Framework Directive. This is the middle band on the five part framework scale, which ranges from high, good, and moderate, through to poor and bad.

The river is unusual in that it supports a population of native White clawed crayfish in the upper reaches, which is an endangered species in the UK. In 2013, Crayfish plague was discovered in the lower parts of the river; the fungal plague is carried by the non-native American signal crayfish and is deadly to the native white clawed species. Efforts are being made to restrict the spread of the disease in order that the crayfish in the headwaters and in nearby ponds are not infected.

Between Yoxall and Wychnor, a wetland woodland meadow has been created by felling a conifer plantation. Known as Swarbourn meadow, the wetland habitat is also the location for an artificial holt which has been constructed in order to attract otters from the Trent where they have previously been spotted.

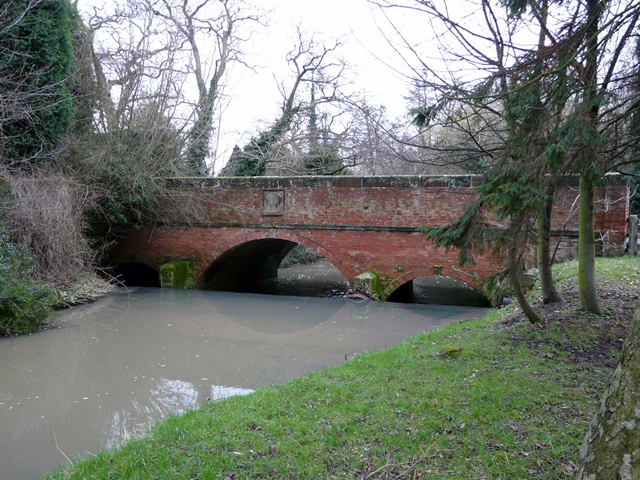
Bridge over the Swarbourn in Yoxall

== See also ==
- List of rivers of England
