= Cromwell Lock =

Lock in Nottinghamshire, England, UK

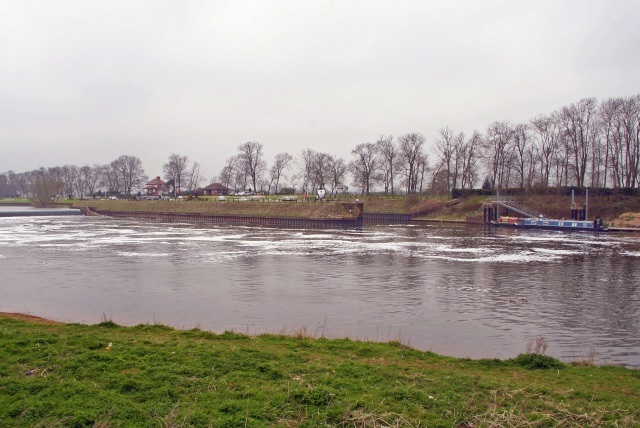
- Cromwell Weir and Lock
- Interactive map of Cromwell Lock
- 53.14137°N 0.79248°W
- Waterway: River Trent
- County: Nottinghamshire

Cromwell Lock is a large navigation lock on the River Trent in Nottinghamshire, England. The first lock to be built on the site was constructed by the Trent Navigation Company, having been authorised by an Act of Parliament obtained in 1906. Construction began in late 1908, as soon as the Company had raised sufficient capital. The lock was extended in 1935, when an extra pair of gates were added downstream of the main lock, effectively forming a second lock. The lock was further improved in 1960, when the two locks were made into one, capable of holding eight standard Trent barges.

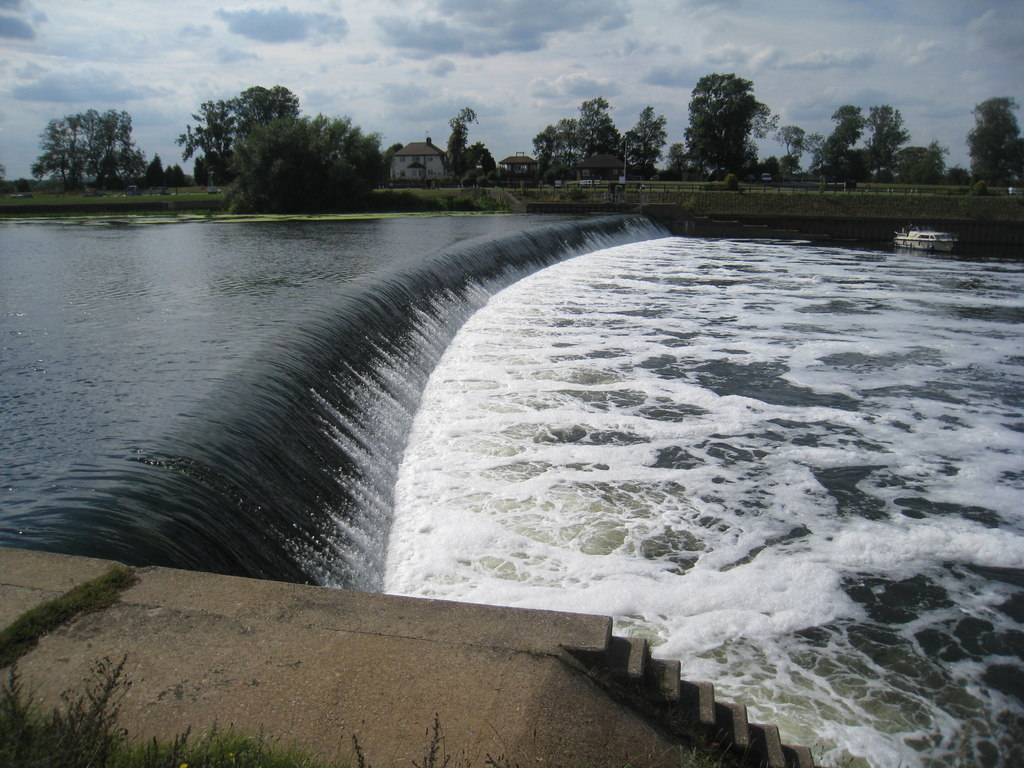
Cromwell Weir

Cromwell Weir by the side of the lock is the second largest weir on the Trent, after Beeston weir, and marks the tidal limit of the river.

The site is defined by the Ordnance Survey as the nearest tidal location to Coton in the Elms in Derbyshire, which is the furthest point from the sea in Great Britain, located 72 kilometres (45 mi) away.

On 28 September 1975, during an eighty-mile, night navigation exercise in extreme weather conditions, ten members of the 131 Parachute Squadron, Royal Engineers were killed after a power failure caused the navigation lights on the weir to go out and their boat went over the crest. A memorial garden with a block of Scottish granite bearing the names of the men who died, lies next to the lock.
