= Biddulph Moor =

Village in Staffordshire, England

Coordinates: 53°7′12″N 2°8′29″W

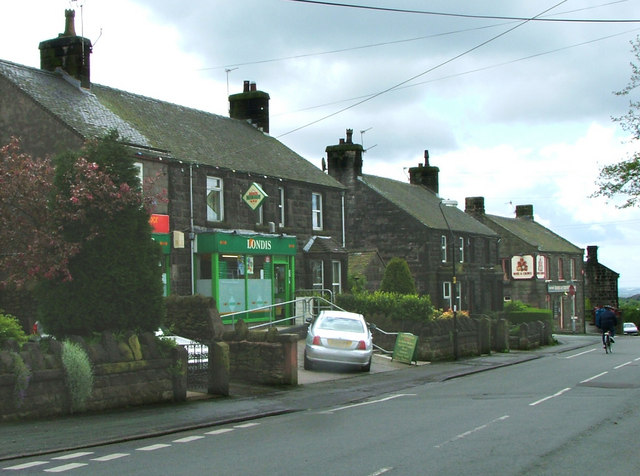
- Village centre
- Population: 1,640 (2011.Ward)
- Shire county: Staffordshire
- Region: West Midlands
- Country: England
- Sovereign state: United Kingdom
- Post town: Stoke-on-Trent
- Postcode district: ST8
- Police: Staffordshire
- Fire: Staffordshire
- Ambulance: West Midlands

Biddulph Moor is a village located on the hill which bears the same name. It is in Biddulph parish and is a part of the Staffordshire Moorlands district in England. It is very similar to Mow Cop which is located on the other side of the valley of Biddulph. It is semi-rural and is the source of the River Trent.

== In legend ==
Legend has it that the people of Biddulph Moor are descended from Saracen warriors captured during the Crusades.

== Geography ==
The highest point is over 300 metres above sea level and it enjoys views over the Staffordshire and Cheshire plains and on a clear day the Welsh mountains are visible.

The nearest railway station is Congleton which is 4 miles away. The nearest city is Stoke on Trent which is approximately 10 miles away.

The source of the River Trent is a short walk down a public footpath that can be picked up at the end of Trentley Drive.

== Features ==
The village has three churches, a first school, a post office, one local shop, a pharmacy and two pubs. Next to the local village hall there is a park where many different events such as fund-raising events are held. One of the more significant and popular of these is 'Rock on The Rocks', an outdoor music event held each summer.

Just out of the village to the south is an unusual and attractive rocky outcrop, 'Rock End', with views to the southwest.

The most common names on the Moor used to be Bailey, Nixon, and Brooks. The names Stanway and Pass are also very prevalent. It is believed that during the middle ages Saracen men populated the area to work in mining of coal. These were known locally as 'The Black Men Of Biddle' due to their very dark features. The Biddulph valley coal seam was very rich and mined up until the early 1980s. Bailey's hill and Robin hill are prominent features.

Nearby Rushton Spencer has the ancient church of St Lawrence, which stands in the wilderness and has many fascinating stories associated. It is a Grade II* listed building.
