= Way for the Millennium =

41-mile footpath in Staffordshire, England

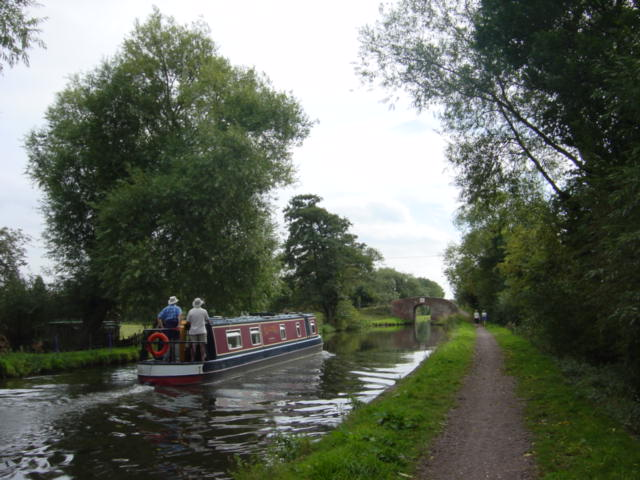
- Section of the Way for the Millennium on the towpath of the Trent and Mersey Canal
- Length: 41 mi (66 km)
- Location: Staffordshire
- Trailheads: Newport; 52.7656°N 2.3179°W; Burton upon Trent; 52.8075°N 1.6570°W
- Use: Walking
- Difficulty: Easy
- Season: All year round

The Way for the Millennium is a 41-mile-long (66 km) east–west route across Staffordshire, deliberately designed for easy walking, using towpaths, old railway lines and footpaths and visiting attractive countryside and green spaces.

== Route ==
The path starts east of Newport, Shropshire, and follows the disused Newport to Stafford railway line via Gnosall, Haughton and Derrington. Crossing Stafford town centre, it picks up the Staffordshire and Worcestershire and Trent and Mersey canals through Milford, Shugborough and Rugeley, then crosses open country from Armitage via Yoxall to Wychnor. It then rejoins the Trent and Mersey north via Barton-under-Needwood, ending in Burton upon Trent.
