= Fowlea Brook =

Stream in Staffordshire, England

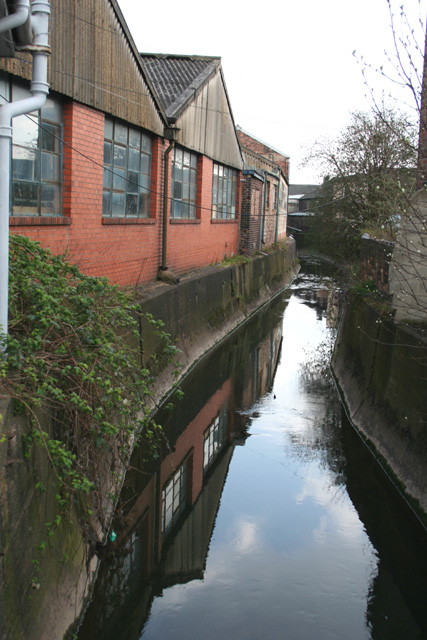
- View from Liverpool road

- Fowlea brook within Staffordshire

Location
- Country: England
- Counties: Staffordshire

Physical characteristics
- Source
  - coordinates: 53.0614°N 2.2484°W
- Mouth
  - location: Stoke, Staffordshire
  - coordinates: 53.0031°N 2.1793°W
- Length: 10 km (6.2 mi)
- Basin size: 29 km^{2} (11 sq mi)

Basin features
- Tributaries
  - left: Scotia Brook
- Progression : Fowlea Brook—Trent—Humber

Fowlea Brook rises in Staffordshire and flows through the northern parts of Stoke-on-Trent, England. It is a tributary stream of the River Trent, and is 6 miles (9.7 km) long.

== Course and catchment ==
Its source is on the high ground near Peacock Hay, a little south of the southern end of Bathpool Park. From there the brook flows south-east in a narrow valley, past the new industrial park at Chatterley where it is then partially culverted as it passes near the Chemical Lane industrial estate. It reappears down the western side of the nature reserve of Westport Lake, but is culverted again beneath Longport, where it is joined by its only named tributary, the Scotia Brook which flows down from Tunstall.

It then flows past the foot of the Middleport Allotments and on through the low Eturia valley through the new Enterprise Zone and alongside the Festival Park site. In summer 2022 it had its culvert removed here, and extensive wildlife work was done on the channel. Then on through the residential parts of Etruria and into Cliffe Vale. Thereafter it passes through the town centre of Stoke-upon-Trent, where it also culverted. The brook then finally flows to the east, joining the River Trent near the Stoke Minster church, though today the confluence is beneath the dual carriageway of the A500. A weir was removed here in summer 2022, enabling fish from the Trent to access the Fowlea.

The brook has been designated as a main river between Middleport and its confluence with the River Trent, since it is the main watercourse in the Etruria Valley.

The catchment or drainage basin lies between that of the Ford Green Brook to the north and east, and that of the Lyme brook over the valley ridge to the south and west, and has an area of 11 square miles (28 km^{2}).

== Pollution ==
At the start of the industrial revolution the Fowlea valley was chosen as the location for Wedgwood's Etruria pottery factory. The book of collected oral history People of the Potteries gave first-hand accounts that, in the 1820s-30s, the Fowlea ran through a "marshy meadow" where "the rushes that grew here were a favourite resort for curious birds in winter, and now and then even sea birds would find their way to the place. [and that] its waters were as clear as spring waters, and its embankments studded with willow trees.”

Further industrial growth took place with the arrival of the Trent & Mersey canal, with brick, tile and later sanitary-ware factories such as Twyford's being built nearby. Later heavy industry arrived at Etruria in the form of deep coal mines, and iron and then steel works, culminating in the Shelton Bar steel works and later the steel rolling mill in the 1960s.

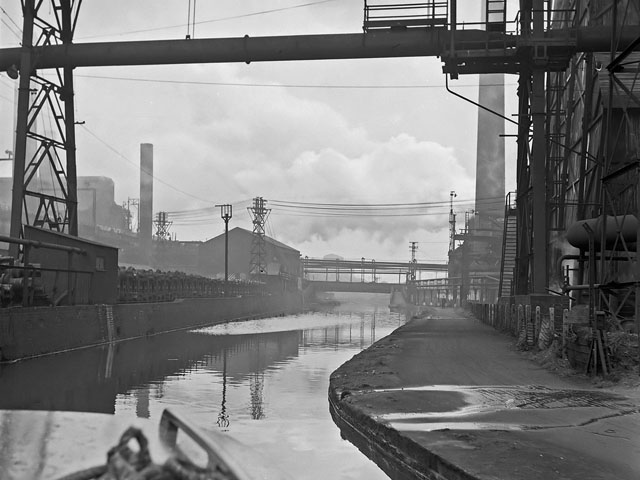
The former Shelton Bar steelworks, demolished and restored in the 1980s.

In the Victorian period the discharges from the heavier industrial processes, and especially the effluent from a sewage works, meant that the brook and River Trent in the Potteries became heavily polluted. Effluent from Burslem, Hanley, Tunstall and Wolstanton all found its way into the brook. In Tunstall, prior to the opening of a sewage works in 1878, legal action had been threatened due to the continued pollution of the canal and the brook.

In the 1950s, when the cumulative toll of pollution was at its worst, the Trent River Board stated that "in the Stoke-on-Trent area, reaches of the Trent and the Fowlea brook were considered to be a potential danger to public health". The brook was then the most heavily polluted stream in the Potteries, and devoid of any fish.

== Restoration ==
Improvements made to the brook and its adjacent environment in the 2000s and 2010s meant that it is classed as having 'moderate' ecological quality under the Water Framework Directive. This is in middle of the bands in the five-part framework scale, which ranges from high, good, and moderate, through to poor and finally bad. This change represents a strong improvement, compared to the previous near-dead state of the Brook.

Further major cleaning and restoration work has been ongoing since 2018, and by the end of summer 2022 wildlife habitat work at Etruria and a weir-removal was complete.

In July 2023 a major £9.5m two-year project was announced for the lower section of the Brook, starting October 2023. This will improve the final section into and through Stoke town and to the nearby confluence with the River Trent.

The Brook runs down the western side of Westport Lakes, a large local nature reserve, where the brook is integral to a significant natural corridor. There it runs alongside a long wildlife path that runs around the back of the Lakes.

== See also ==
- Rivers of England
