= River Trent =

River in England – third-longest in the UK

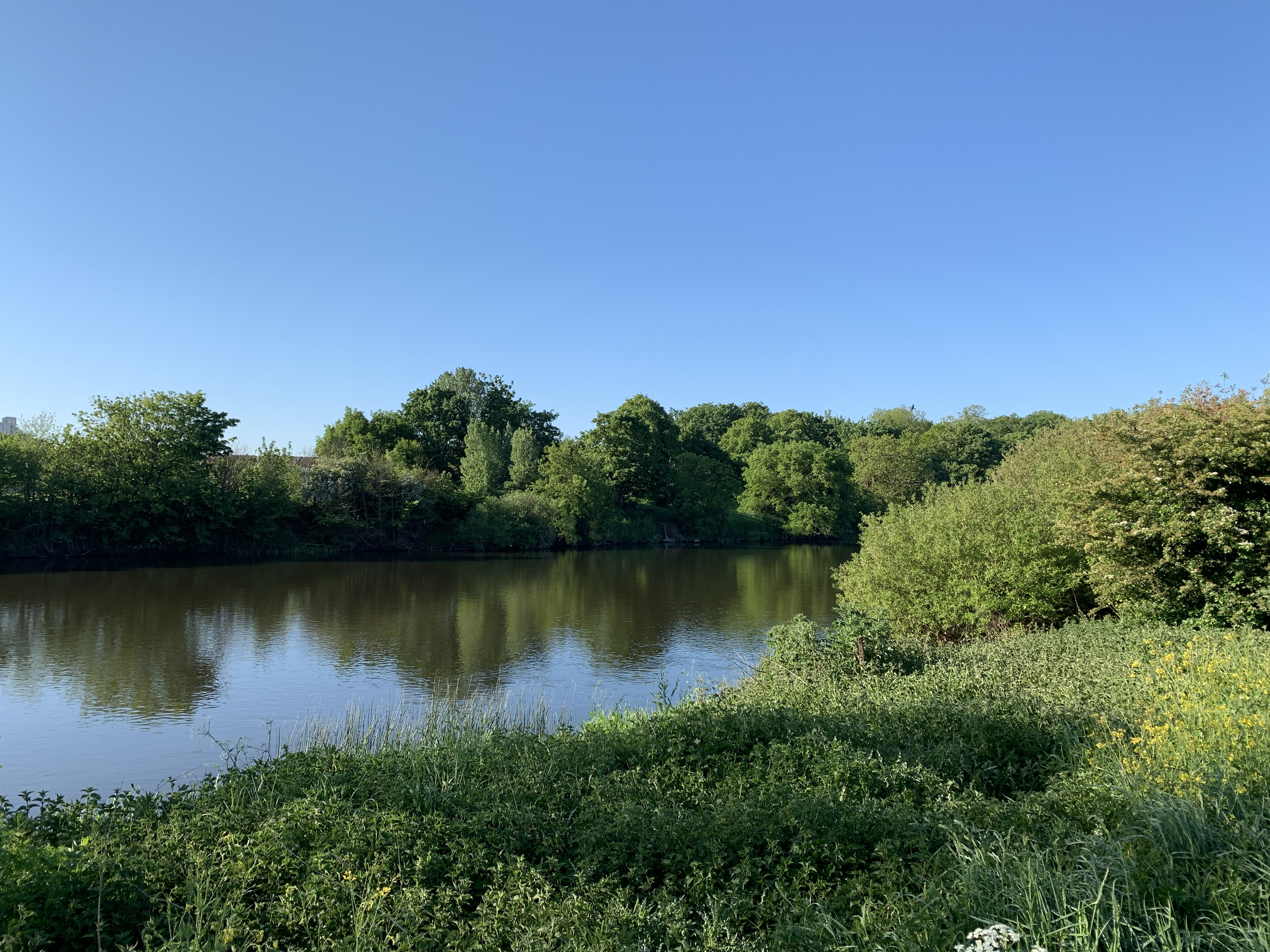
- Near the City of Nottingham

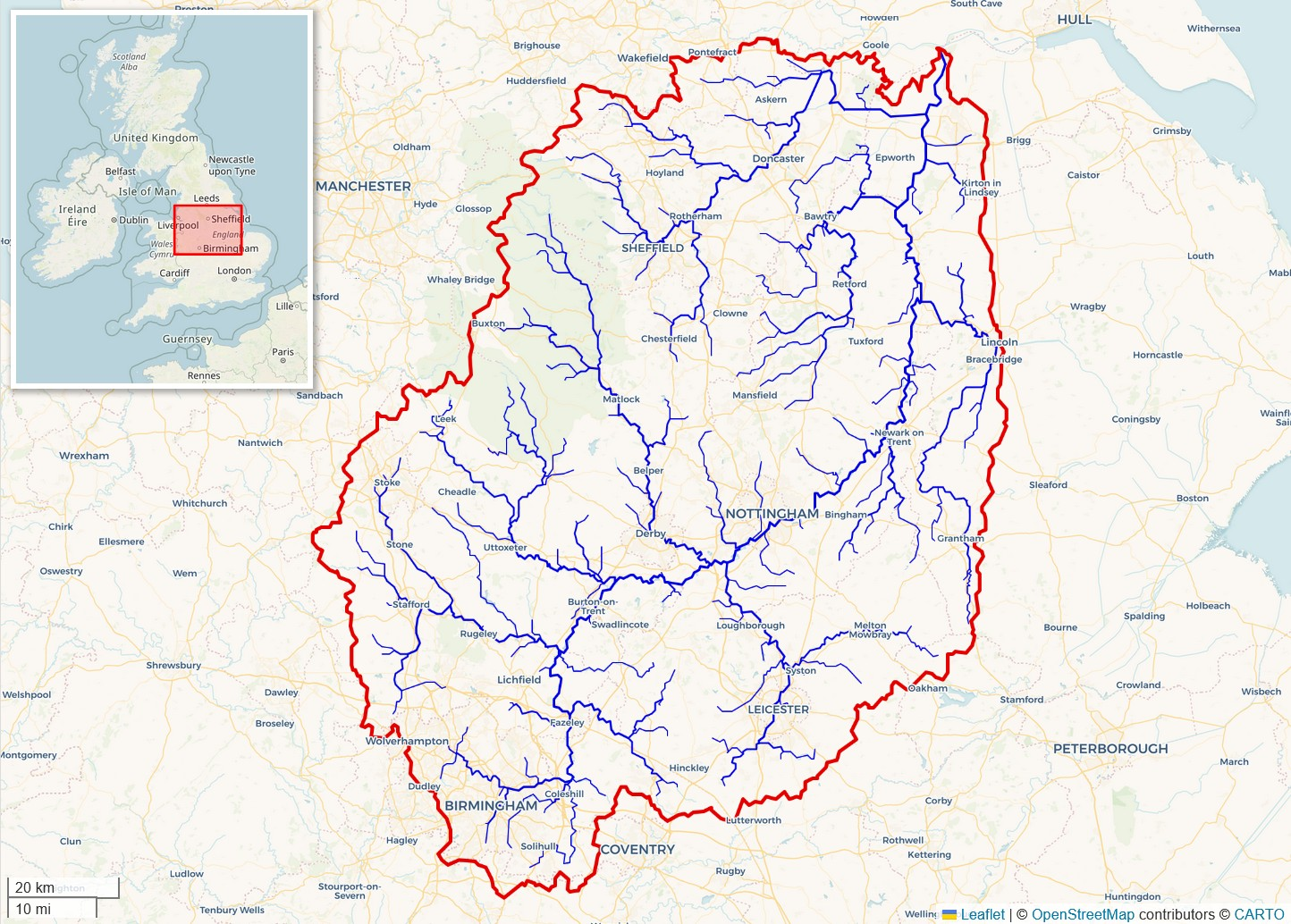
- Drainage basin of the River Trent (Interactive map)

Location
- Country: United Kingdom
- Country within the UK: England
- Counties: Staffordshire, Derbyshire, Leicestershire, Nottinghamshire, Lincolnshire, Yorkshire
- Cities: Stoke-on-Trent, Nottingham
- Towns: Stone, Rugeley, Burton upon Trent, Newark-on-Trent, Gainsborough

Physical characteristics
- Source
  - location: Biddulph Moor, Staffordshire, England
  - coordinates: 53°06′58″N 02°08′25″W
  - elevation: 275 m (902 ft)
- Mouth
  - location: Trent Falls, Humber Estuary, Lincolnshire, England
  - coordinates: 53°42′N 0°42′W
  - elevation: 0 m (0 ft)
- Length: 298 km (185 mi)
- Basin size: 10,435 km^{2} (4,029 sq mi) (Note: Also listed as 10,452 km^{2}.)
- Discharge
  - location: Colwick
  - average: 84 m^{3}/s (3,000 cu ft/s)
  - minimum: 15 m^{3}/s (530 cu ft/s) (Note: Recorded 23–24 August 1976.)
  - maximum: 1,018 m^{3}/s (36,000 cu ft/s) (Note: Recorded at 1230hrs on 8 November 2000 – highest discharge since 1 September 1958.)
- Discharge
  - location: North Muskham
  - average: 88 m^{3}/s (3,100 cu ft/s)

Basin features
- Progression: River Trent → Humber → North Sea
- Tributaries
  - left: Blithe, Swarbourn, Dove, Derwent, Erewash, Leen, Greet, Idle, Torne
  - right: Sow, Tame, Mease, Soar, Devon, Eau

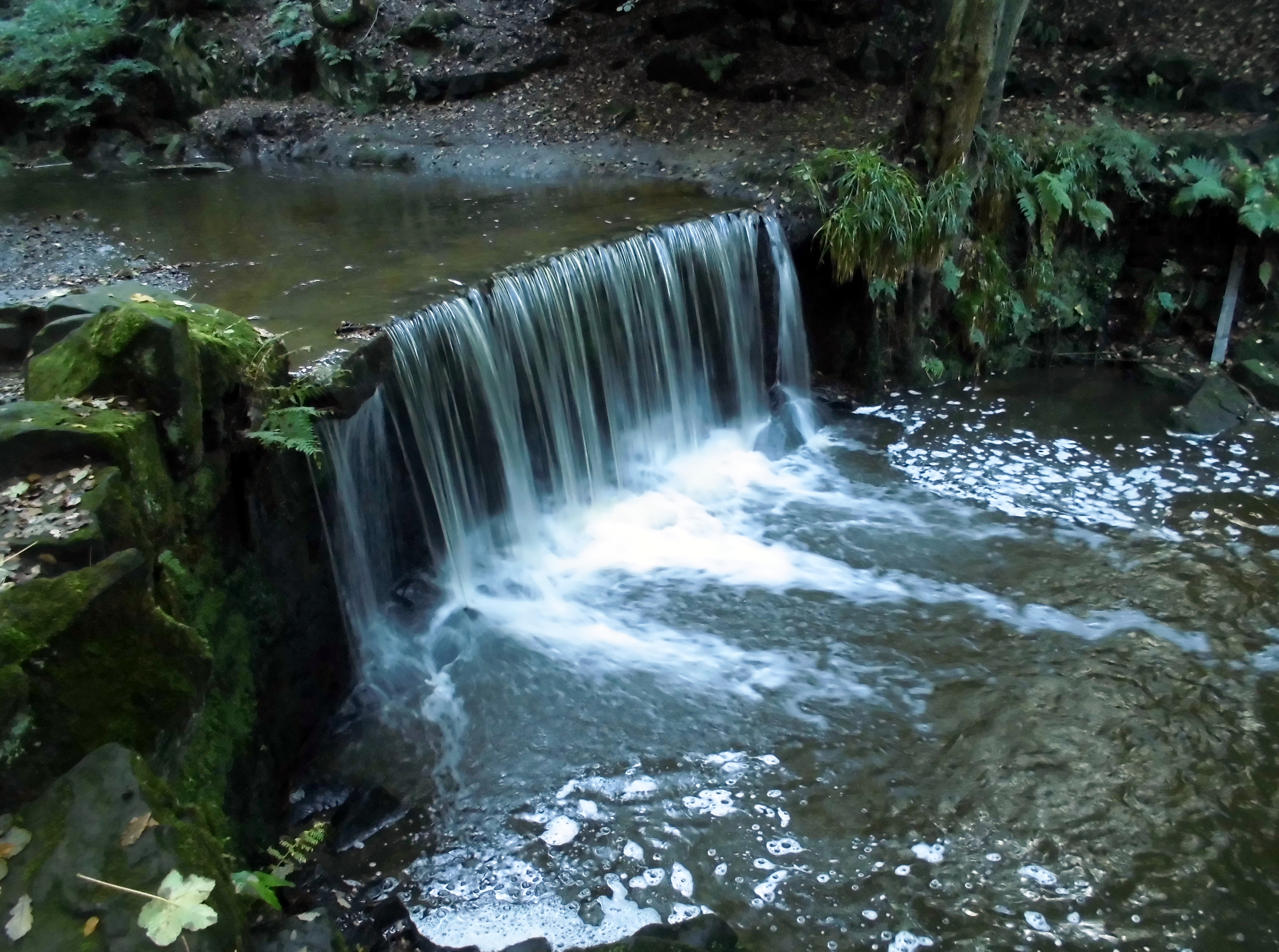
The Trent passing over a man-made waterfall in Hollin Wood just downstream from its source

The Trent, the third-longest river in the United Kingdom, has its source in Staffordshire, on the southern edge of Biddulph Moor. It drains the North Midlands, eventually flowing into the Humber Estuary. The river is known for dramatic flooding after storms and spring snowmelt, which in the past have often caused its course to change.

The river passes through Stoke-on-Trent, Stone, Rugeley, Burton-upon-Trent, Nottingham, Newark-on-Trent and Gainsborough before joining the Yorkshire Ouse at Trent Falls to form the Humber Estuary, which empties into the North Sea between Kingston upon Hull in Yorkshire and Immingham in Lincolnshire. The wide Humber estuary has often been characterised as the boundary between the Midlands and Northern England ("The North").

== Name ==
The name "Trent" is possibly from a Romano-British word meaning "strongly flooding". More specifically, the name may be a contraction of two Romano-British words, tros ("over") and hynt ("way"). This may indeed indicate a river that is prone to flooding. However, a more likely explanation may be that it was considered to be a river that could be crossed principally by means of fords, i.e. the river flowed over major road routes. This may explain the presence of the Romano-British element rid (cf. Welsh rhyd, "ford") in various place names along the Trent, such as Hill Ridware, as well as the Old English‐derived ford. Another translation is given as "the trespasser", referring to the waters flooding over the land. According to Koch at the University of Wales, the name Trent derives from Trisantona, a Romano-British reflex of the combined elements *tri-sent(o)-on-ā- (through-path-augmentative-feminine-) 'great thoroughfare'. A traditional but almost certainly wrong opinion is that of Izaak Walton, who states in The Compleat Angler (1653) that the Trent is "... so called from thirty kind of fishes that are found in it, or for that it receiveth thirty lesser rivers."

== Course ==
The Trent rises within the Staffordshire Moorlands district, near the village of Biddulph Moor, from a number of sources including the Trent Head Well. It is then joined by other small streams to form the Head of Trent, which flows south, to the only reservoir along its course at Knypersley Reservoir. Downstream of the reservoir it passes through Stoke-on-Trent and merges with the Lyme, Fowlea and other brooks that drain the six towns of the Staffordshire Potteries to become the River Trent. On the southern fringes of Stoke, it passes through the landscaped parkland of Trentham Gardens.

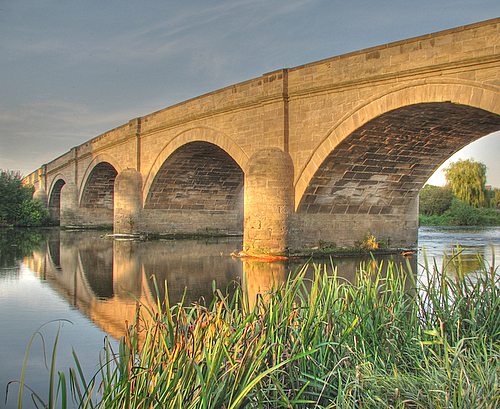
Swarkestone Bridge

The river then continues south through the market town of Stone, and after passing the village of Salt, it reaches Great Haywood, where it is spanned by the 16th-century Essex Bridge near Shugborough Hall. At this point the River Sow joins it from Stafford. The Trent now flows south-east past the town of Rugeley until it reaches Kings Bromley where it meets the Blithe. After the confluence with the Swarbourn, it passes Alrewas and reaches Wychnor, where it is crossed by the A38 road dual carriageway, which follows the route of the Roman Ryknild Street. The river turns north-east where it is joined by its largest tributary, the River Tame (which is at this point actually the larger, though its earlier length shorter) and immediately afterwards by the River Mease, creating a larger river that now flows through a broad floodplain.

The river continues north-east, passing the village of Walton-on-Trent until it reaches the large town of Burton-upon-Trent. The river in Burton is crossed by a number of bridges including the ornate 19th-century Ferry Bridge that links Stapenhill to the town. To the north-east of Burton the river is joined by the River Dove at Newton Solney and enters Derbyshire, before passing between the villages of Willington and Repton where it turns directly east to reach Swarkestone Bridge. Shortly afterwards, the river becomes the Derbyshire-Leicestershire border, passing the traditional crossing point of King's Mill, Castle Donington, Weston-on-Trent and Aston-on-Trent.

At Shardlow, where the Trent and Mersey Canal begins, the river also meets the Derwent at Derwent Mouth. After this confluence, the river turns north-east and is joined by the River Soar before reaching the outskirts of Nottingham, where it is joined by the River Erewash near the Attenborough nature reserve and enters Nottinghamshire. As it enters the city, it passes the suburbs of Beeston, Clifton and Wilford; where it is joined by the Leen. On reaching West Bridgford it flows beneath Trent Bridge near the cricket ground of the same name, and beside The City Ground, home of Nottingham Forest F.C., until it reaches Holme Sluices.

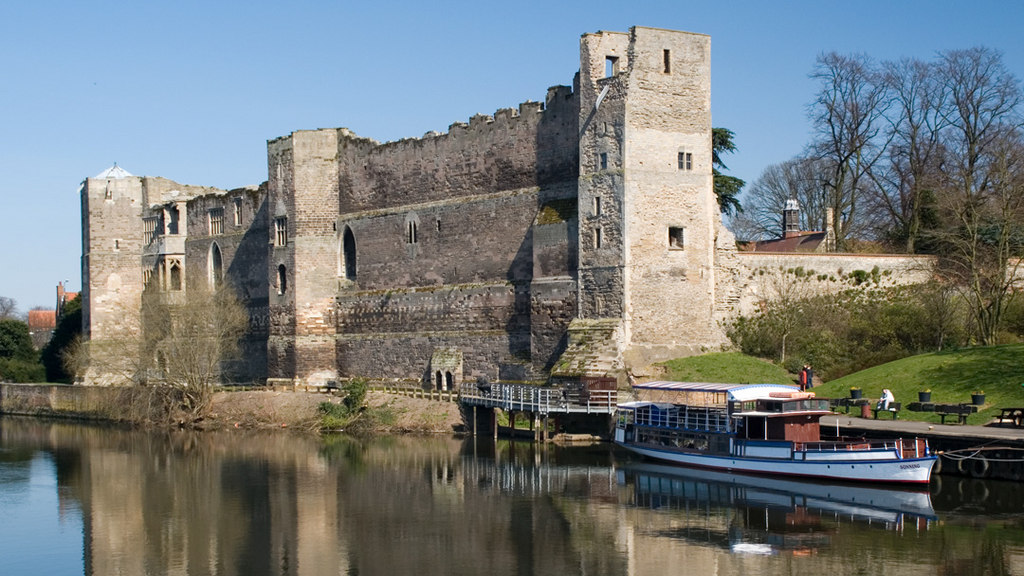
Newark Castle, Nottinghamshire

Downstream of Nottingham it passes Radcliffe-on-Trent, Stoke Bardolph and Burton Joyce before reaching Gunthorpe with its bridge, lock and weir. The river now flows north-east below the Toot and Trent Hills before reaching Hazelford Ferry, Fiskerton and Farndon. To the north of Farndon, beside the Staythorpe Power Station the river splits, with one arm passing Averham and Kelham, and the other arm, which is navigable, being joined by the Devon before passing through the market town of Newark-on-Trent and beneath the town's castle walls. The two arms recombine at Crankley Point beyond the town, where the river turns due north to pass North Muskham and Holme to reach Cromwell Weir, below which the Trent becomes tidal.

The river, which by this point has become tidal, meanders across a wide floodplain, at the edge of which are located riverside villages such as Carlton and Sutton on Trent, Besthorpe and Girton. After passing the site of High Marnham power station, it becomes the approximate boundary between Nottinghamshire and Lincolnshire, and reaches the only toll bridge along its course at Dunham on Trent. Downstream of Dunham the river passes Church Laneham and reaches Torksey, where it meets the Foss Dyke navigation which connects the Trent to Lincoln and the River Witham. Further north at Littleborough is the site of the Roman town of Segelocum, where a Roman road once crossed the river.

It then reaches the town of Gainsborough, which has its own Trent Bridge. The river frontage in the town is lined with warehouses, which date from the time when the town was an inland port; many of them have been renovated for modern use. Downstream of the town the villages are often named in pairs, representing the fact that they were once linked by a river ferry between the two settlements. These villages include West Stockwith and East Stockwith, Owston Ferry and East Ferry, and West Butterwick and East Butterwick. At West Stockwith the Trent is joined by the Chesterfield Canal and the River Idle, and soon afterward enters Lincolnshire fully, passing to the west of Scunthorpe. The last bridge over the river is at Keadby where it is joined by both the Stainforth and Keadby Canal and the River Torne.

Downstream of Keadby the river progressively widens, passing Amcotts and Flixborough to reach Burton upon Stather and finally Trent Falls. At this point, between Alkborough and Faxfleet, the river reaches the boundary with Yorkshire and joins the River Ouse to form the Humber which flows into the North Sea.

=== Migration of course in historic times ===
Unusually for an English river, the channel altered significantly during historic times, and has been described as being similar to the Mississippi in this respect, especially in its middle reaches, where there are numerous old meanders and cut-off loops. An abandoned channel at Repton is described on an old map as 'Old Trent Water'; records show that this was once the main navigable route, with the river having switched to a more northerly course in the 18th century. Farther downstream at Hemington, archaeologists have found the remains of a medieval bridge across another abandoned channel. Researchers using aerial photographs and historical maps have identified many of these palaeochannel features; a well-documented example is the meander cutoff at Sawley. The river's propensity to change course is referred to in Shakespeare's play Henry IV, Part 1:

Methinks my moiety, north from Burton here,
In quantity equals not one of yours:
See how this river comes me cranking in,
And cuts me from the best of all my land
A huge half-moon, a monstrous cantle out.
I'll have the current in this place damm'd up;
And here the smug and silver Trent shall run
In a new channel, fair and evenly;
It shall not wind with such a deep indent,
To rob me of so rich a bottom here.

— William Shakespeare, Henry IV, Part 1, act 3, scene I

Henry Hotspur's speech complaining about the river has been linked to the meanders near West Burton, however, given the wider context of the scene, in which conspirators propose to divide England into three after a revolt, it is thought that Hotspur's intentions were of a grander design, diverting the river east towards the Wash such that he would benefit from a much larger share of the divided Kingdom. Downstream of Burton upon Trent, the river increasingly trends northwards, cutting off a portion of Nottinghamshire and nearly all of Lincolnshire from his share, north of the Trent. The idea for this scene, may have been based on the disagreement regarding a mill weir near Shelford Manor, between local landowners Gilbert Talbot, Earl of Shrewsbury, and Sir Thomas Stanhope which culminated with a long diversion channel being dug to bypass the mill. This took place in 1593 so would have been a contemporary topic in the Shakespearean period.

=== Prehistory ===
During the Pleistocene epoch (1.7 million years ago), the River Trent rose in the Welsh hills and flowed almost east from Nottingham through the present Vale of Belvoir, cutting the Ancaster Gap through the limestone ridge at Ancaster and thence to the North Sea. At the end of the Wolstonian Stage (c. 130,000 years ago) a mass of stagnant ice left in the Vale of Belvoir caused the river to divert north along the old Lincoln river, through the Lincoln Gap, along what is now the course of the Witham. During a following glaciation (Devensian, 70,000 BC) the ice held back vast areas of water – called Glacial Lake Humber – in the current lower Trent basin. When this retreated, the Trent adopted its current course into the Humber.

== Catchment ==
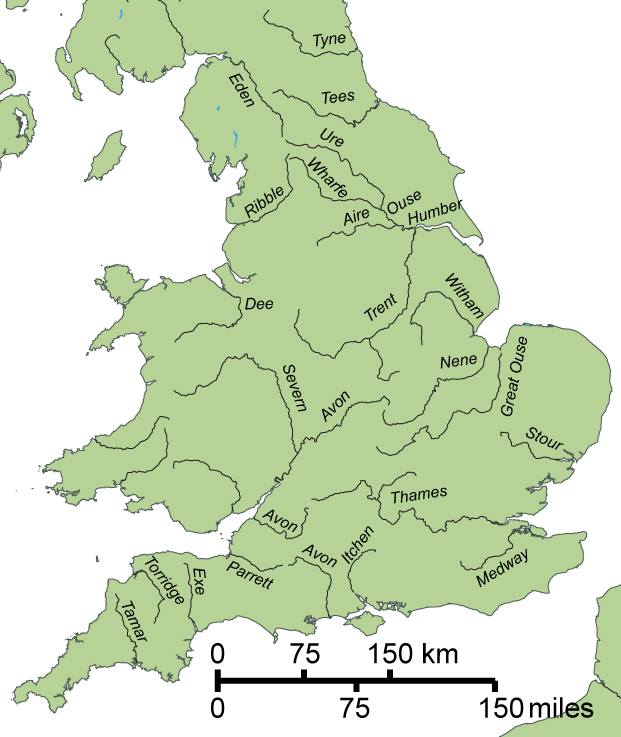
The River Trent within England

The Trent basin covers a large part of the Midlands, and includes the majority of the counties of Staffordshire, Derbyshire, Leicestershire, Nottinghamshire and the West Midlands; but also includes parts of Lincolnshire, South Yorkshire, Warwickshire and Rutland. The catchment is located between the drainage basins of the Severn and its tributary the Avon to the south and west, the Weaver to the north-west, the tributaries of the Yorkshire Ouse to the North and the basins of the Welland, Witham and Ancholme to the east.

A distinctive feature of the catchment is the marked variation in the topography and character of the landscape, which varies from the upland moorland headwaters of the Dark Peak, where the highest point of the catchment is the Kinder Scout plateau at 634 metres (2,080 ft); through to the intensively farmed and drained flat fenland areas that exist alongside the lower tidal reaches, where ground levels can equal sea level. These lower reaches are protected from tidal flooding by a series of floodbanks and defences.

Elsewhere there is a distinct contrast between the open limestone areas of the White Peak in the Dove catchment, and the large woodland areas, including Sherwood Forest in the Dukeries area of the Idle catchment, the upland Charnwood Forest, and the National Forest in the Soar and Mease drainage basins respectively.

Land use
- 48% Arable
- 28% Pasture
- 17% Urban
- 4% Woodland
- 2% Natural grassland
- 1% Wetlands & lakes

Land use is predominantly rural, with some three-quarters of the Trent catchment given over to agriculture. This ranges from moorland grazing of sheep in the upland areas, through to improved pasture and mixed farms in the middle reaches, where dairy farming is important. Intensive arable farming of cereals and root vegetables, chiefly potatoes and sugar beet occurs in the lowland areas, such as the Vale of Belvoir and the lower reaches of the Trent, Torne and Idle. Water level management is important in these lowland areas, and the local watercourses are usually maintained by internal drainage boards and their successors, with improved drainage being assisted by the use of pumping stations to lift water into embanked carrier rivers, which subsequently discharge into the Trent.

The less populous rural areas are offset by a number of large urbanised areas including the conurbations of Stoke-on-Trent, Birmingham and the surrounding Black Country in the West Midlands; and in the East Midlands the major university cities and historical county seats of Leicester, Derby and Nottingham. Together these contain the majority of the 6 million people who live in the catchment.

The majority of these urban areas are in the upper reaches of either the Trent itself, as is the case with Stoke, or its tributaries. For example, Birmingham lies at the upper end of the Tame, and Leicester is located towards the head of the Soar. Whilst this is not unique for an English river, it does mean that there is an ongoing legacy of issues relating to urban runoff, pollution incidents, and effluent dilution from sewage treatment, industry and coal mining. Historically, these issues resulted in a considerable deterioration in the water quality of both the Trent and its tributaries, especially the Tame. To bring clean water to the West Midlands, Birmingham Corporation created a large reservoir chain and aqueduct system to bring water from the Elan Valley.

== Geology ==
Underlying the upper reaches of the Trent, are formations of Millstone Grit and Carboniferous Coal Measures which include layers of sandstones, marls and coal seams. The river crosses a band of Triassic Sherwood sandstone at Sandon, and it meets the same sandstone again as it flows beside Cannock Chase, between Great Haywood and Armitage, there is also another outcrop between Weston-on-Trent and King's Mill.

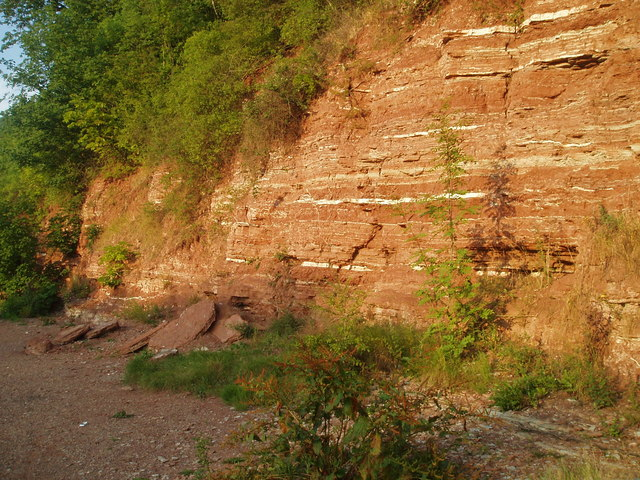
Mercia Mudstone formation at Gunthorpe

Downstream of Armitage the solid geology is primarily Mercia Mudstones, the course of the river following the arc of these mudstones as they pass through the Midlands all the way to the Humber. The mudstones are not exposed by the bed of the river, as there is a layer of gravels and then alluvium above the bedrock. In places, however the mudstones do form river cliffs, most notably at Gunthorpe and Stoke Lock near Radcliffe on Trent, the village being named after the distinctive red coloured strata.

The low range of hills, which have been formed into a steep set of cliffs overlooking the Trent between Scunthorpe and Alkborough are also made up of mudstones, but are of the younger Rhaetic Penarth Group.

In the wider catchment the geology is more varied, ranging from the Precambrian rocks of the Charnwood Forest, through to the Jurassic limestone that forms the Lincolnshire Edge and the eastern watershed of the Trent. The most important in terms of the river are the extensive sandstone and limestone aquifers that underlie many of the tributary catchments. These include the Sherwood sandstones that occur beneath much of eastern Nottinghamshire, the Permian Lower Magnesian limestone and the carboniferous limestone in Derbyshire. Not only do these provide baseflows to the major tributaries, the groundwater is an important source for public water supply.

Gravel Terraces of the River Trent
Name	Age thousand yrs BP	Stage
Eagle Moor	> 400	Anglian
Etwall / Whisby Farm	297	Early Wolstonian
Egginton / Balderton	195	Late Wolstonian
Beeston / Scarle	80	Devensian
Holme Pierrepont	26	Devensian
Hemington	10	Flandrian

Sand, gravels and alluvium deposits that overlie the mudstone bedrock occur almost along the entire length of the river, and are an important feature of the middle and lower reaches, with the alluvial river silt producing fertile soils that are used for intensive agriculture in the Trent valley. Beneath the alluvium are widespread deposits of sand and gravel, which also occur as gravel terraces considerably above the height of the current river level. There is thought to be a complex succession of at least six separate gravel terrace systems along the river, deposited when a much larger Trent flowed through the existing valley, and along its ancestral routes through the water gaps at Lincoln and Ancaster.

This 'staircase' of flat topped terraces was created as a result of successive periods of deposition and subsequent down cutting by the river, a product of the meltwater and glacially eroded material produced from ice sheets at the end of glacial periods through the Pleistocene epoch between 450,000 and 12,000 years BP. Contained within these terraces is evidence of the mega fauna that once lived along the river, the bones and teeth of animals such as the woolly mammoth, bison and wolves that existed during colder periods have all been identified. Another notable find in a related terrace system near Derby from a warmer interglacial period, was the Allenton hippopotamus.

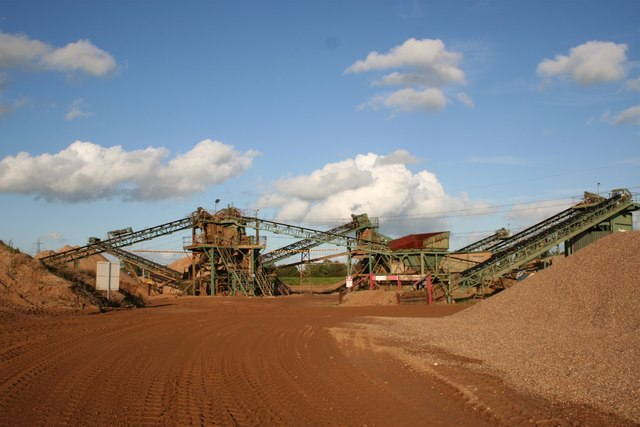
Gravel extraction at Besthorpe

The lower sequences of these terraces have been widely quarried for sand and gravel, and the extraction of these minerals continues to be an important industry in the Trent Valley, with some three million tonnes of aggregates being produced each year. Once worked out, the remaining gravel pits which are usually flooded by the relatively high water table have been reused for a wide variety of purposes. These include recreational water activities, and once rehabilitated, as nature reserves and wetlands.

During the end of the last Devensian glacial period the formation of Lake Humber in the lowest reaches of the river, meant that substantial lake bed clays and silts were laid down to create the flat landscape of the Humberhead Levels. These levels extend across the Trent valley, and include the lower reaches of the Eau, Torne and Idle. In some areas, successive layers of peat were built up above the lacustrine deposits during the Holocene period, which created lowland mires such as the Thorne and Hatfield Moors.

== Hydrology ==
The topography, geology and land use of the Trent catchment all have a direct influence on the hydrology of the river. The variation in these factors is also reflected in the contrasting runoff characteristics and subsequent inflows of the principal tributaries. The largest of these is the River Tame, which contributes nearly a quarter of the total flow for the Trent, with the other significant tributaries being the Derwent at 18%, Soar 17%, the Dove 13%, and the Sow 8%. Four of these main tributaries, including the Dove and Derwent which drain the upland Peak District, all join within the middle reaches, giving rise to a comparatively energetic river system for the UK.

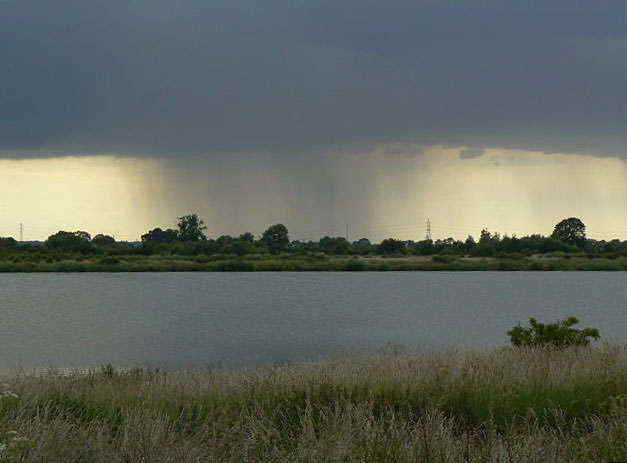
Rainfall in the Trent valley

=== Rainfall ===
Rainfall in the catchment generally follows topography with the highest annual rainfall of 1,450 mm (57 in) and above occurring over the high moorland uplands of the Derwent headwaters to the north and west, with the lowest of 580 mm (23 in), in the lowland areas to the north and east. Rainfall totals in the Tame are not as high as would be expected from the moderate relief, due to the rain shadow effect of the Welsh mountains to the west, reducing amounts to an average of 691 mm (27.2 in) for the tributary basin. The average for the whole Trent catchment is 720 mm (28 in) which is significantly lower than the average for United Kingdom at 1,101 mm (43.3 in) and lower than that for England at 828 mm (32.6 in).

Like other large lowland British rivers, the Trent is vulnerable to long periods of rainfall caused by sluggish low pressure weather systems repeatedly crossing the basin from the Atlantic, especially during the autumn and winter when evaporation is at its lowest. This combination can produce a water-logged catchment that can respond rapidly in terms of runoff, to any additional rainfall. Such conditions occurred in February 1977, with widespread flooding in the lower reaches of the Trent when heavy rain produced a peak flow of nearly 1,000 m^{3}/s (35,000 cu ft/s) at Nottingham. In 2000 similar conditions occurred again, with above average rainfall in the autumn being followed by further rainfall, producing flood conditions in November of that year.

Another meteorological risk, although one that occurs less often, is that related to the rapid melting of snow lying in the catchment. This can be a result of a sudden rise in temperature after a prolonged cold period, or when combined with extensive rainfall. Many of the largest historical floods were caused by snowmelt, but the last such episode occurred when the bitter winter of 1946–7 was followed by a rapid thaw due to rain in March 1947 and caused severe flooding all along the Trent valley.

At the other extreme, extended periods of low rainfall can also cause problems. The lowest flows for the river were recorded during the drought of 1976, following the dry winter of 1975/6. Flows measured at Nottingham were exceptionally low by the end of August, and were given a drought return period of greater than one hundred years.

=== Discharge ===
Discharge of the River Trent at various locations
Gauging Station	County	Discharge (average)		Discharge (maximum)		Catchment Area	
		m^{3}/s	cfs	m^{3}/s	cfs	km^{2}	mi^{2}
Stoke on Trent	Staffs	0.6	21	55	1,900	53	20
Great Haywood	Staffs	4.4	160	98	3,500	325	125
Yoxall	Staffs	12.8	450	206	7,300	1,229	475
Drakelow	Staffs	36.1	1,270	385	13,600	3,072	1,186
Shardlow	Derbys	51.6	1,820	480	17,000	4,400	1,700
Colwick	Notts	83.8	2,960	1,018	36,000	7,486	2,890
North Muskham	Notts	88.4	3,120	1,000	35,000	8,231	3,178

The river's flow is measured at several points along its course, at a number of gauging stations. At Stoke-on-Trent in the upper reaches, the average flow is only 0.6 m^{3}/s (21 cu ft/s), which increases considerably to 4.4 m^{3}/s (160 cu ft/s), at Great Haywood, as it includes the flow of the upper tributaries draining the Potteries conurbation. At Yoxall, the flow increases to 12.8 m^{3}/s (450 cu ft/s) due to the input of larger tributaries including the Sow and Blithe. At Drakelow upstream of Burton the flow increases nearly three-fold to 36.1 m^{3}/s (1,270 cu ft/s), due to the additional inflow from the largest tributary the Tame. At Colwick near Nottingham, the average flow rises to 83.8 m^{3}/s (2,960 cu ft/s), due to the combined inputs of the other major tributaries namely the Dove, Derwent and Soar. The last point of measurement is North Muskham here the average flow is 88.4 m^{3}/s (3,120 cu ft/s), a relatively small increase due to the input of the Devon, and other smaller Nottinghamshire tributaries.

The Trent has marked variations in discharge, with long term average monthly flows at Colwick fluctuating from 45 m^{3}/s (1,600 cu ft/s) in July during the summer, and increasing to 151 m^{3}/s (5,300 cu ft/s) in January. During lower flows the Trent and its tributaries are heavily influenced by effluent returns from sewage works, especially the Tame where summer flows can be made up of 90% effluent. For the Trent this proportion is lower, but with nearly half of low flows being made up of these effluent inflows, it is still significant. There are also baseflow contributions from the major aquifers in the catchment.

Average monthly flows of Trent in cubic metres per second measured at Colwick (Nottingham).

=== Sediment ===
In the lower tidal reaches the Trent has a high sediment load, this fine silt which is also known as 'warp', was used to improve the soil by a process known as warping, whereby river water was allowed to flood into adjacent fields through a series of warping drains, enabling the silt to settle out across the land. Up to 0.3 metres (1 ft) of deposition could occur in a single season, and depths of 1.5 metres (5 ft) have been accumulated over time at some locations. A number of the smaller Trent tributaries are still named as warping drains, such as Morton warping drain, near Gainsborough.

Warp was also used as a commercial product, after being collected from the river banks at low tide, it was transported along the Chesterfield Canal to Walkeringham where it was dried out and refined to be eventually sold as a silver polish for cutlery manufacturers.

== Floods ==
Largest floods on the River Trent at Nottingham
Rank	Date	Level at Trent Bridge		Peak Flow	
		m	ft	m^{3}/s	cfs
1	February 1795	24.55	80.5	1,416	50,000
2	October 1875	24.38	80.0	1,274	45,000
3	March 1947	24.30	79.7	1,107	39,100
4	November 1852	24.26	79.6	1,082	38,200
5	November 2000	23.80	78.1	1,019	36,000
	Normal / Avg flow	20.7	68	84	3,000

The Trent is widely known for its tendency to cause significant flooding along its course, and there is a well-documented flood history extending back for some 900 years. In Nottingham the heights of significant historic floods from 1852 have been carved into a bridge abutment next to Trent Bridge, with flood marks being transferred from the medieval Hethbeth bridge that pre-dated the existing 19th-century crossing. Historic flood levels have also been recorded at Girton and on the churchyard wall at Collingham.

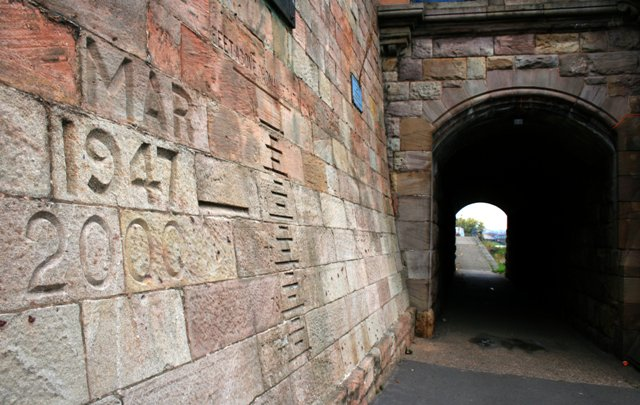
Trent Bridge flood marks

One of the earliest recorded floods along the Trent was in 1141, and like many other large historical events was caused by the melting of snow following heavy rainfall, it also caused a breach in the outer floodbank at Spalford. Some of the earliest floods can be assessed by using Spalford bank as a substitute measure for the size of a particular flood, as it has been estimated that the bank only failed when flows were greater than 1,000 m^{3}/s (35,000 cu ft/s), the bank was also breached in 1403 and 1795.

Early bridges were vulnerable to floods, and in 1309 many bridges were washed away or damaged by severe winter floods, including Hethbeth Bridge. In 1683 the same bridge was partially destroyed by a flood that also meant the loss of the bridge at Newark. Historical archives often record details of the bridge repairs that followed floods, as the cost of these repairs or pontage had to be raised by borrowing money and charging a local toll.

The largest known flood was the Candlemas flood of February 1795, which followed an eight-week period of harsh winter weather; during this time, rivers froze – which meant that mills were unable to grind corn – and subsequently there was a rapid thaw. Due to the size of the flood and the ice entrained in the flow, nearly every bridge along the Trent was badly damaged or washed away. The bridges at Wolseley, Wychnor and the main span at Swarkestone were all destroyed. In Nottingham, residents of Narrow Marsh were trapped by the floodwaters in their first floor rooms, boats were used to take supplies to those stranded. Livestock was badly affected, 72 sheep drowned in Wilford and ten cows were lost in Bridgford. The vulnerable flood bank at Spalford was breached again, floodwaters spreading out across the low-lying land, even reaching the River Witham and flooding Lincoln. Some 20,000 acres (81 km^{2}; 31 sq mi) were flooded for a period of over three weeks.

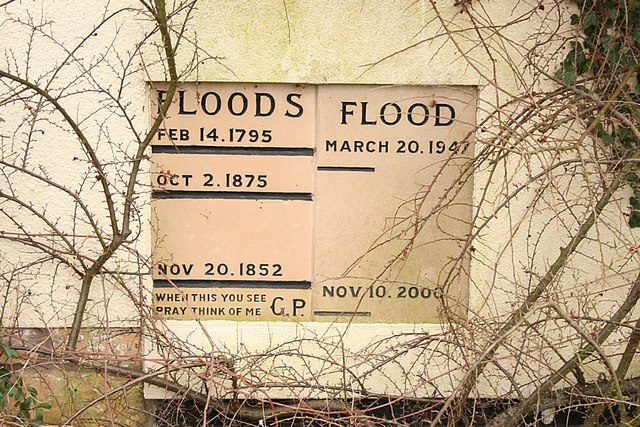
Flood marks at Girton showing the height of the 1795 flood and others

A description of the breach was given as follows:

The bank is formed upon a plain of sandy nature, and when it was broken in 1795, the water forced an immense breach, the size of which may be judged from the fact that eighty loads of faggots and upwards of four hundred tons of earth were required to fill up the hole, an operation which took several weeks to complete.

The flood bank was subsequently strengthened and repaired, following further floods during 1824 and 1852.

The principal flood of the 19th century and the second largest recorded, was in October 1875. In Nottingham a cart overturned in the floodwaters near the Wilford Road and six people drowned, dwellings nearby were flooded to a depth of 6 feet (1.8 m). Although not quite as large as 1795 this flood devastated many places along the river, at Burton upon Trent much of the town was inundated, with flooded streets and houses, and dead animals floating past in the flood. Food was scarce, "in one day 10,000 loaves had to be sent into the town and distributed gratuitously to save people from famine". In Newark the water was deep enough to allow four grammar school boys to row across the countryside to Kelham. The flood marks at Girton show that this flood was only 4 inches (100 mm) lower than that of 1795, when the village was flooded to a depth of 3 feet (0.91 m).

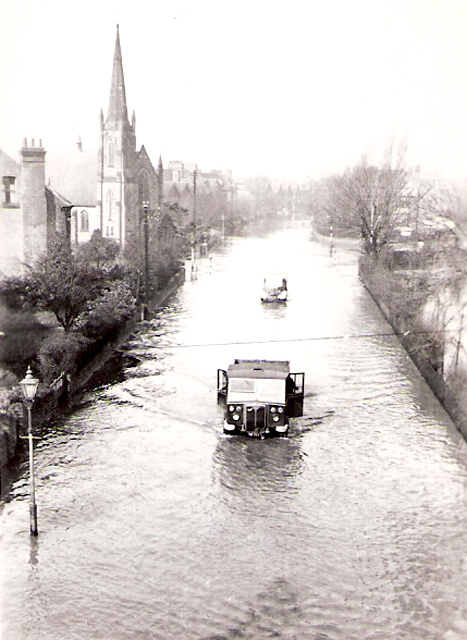
West Bridgford in the floods of March 1947

On 17–18 March 1947 the Trent overtopped its banks in Nottingham. Large parts of the city and surrounding areas were flooded with 9,000 properties and nearly a hundred industrial premises affected some to first floor height. The suburbs of Long Eaton, West Bridgford and Beeston all suffered particularly badly. Two days later, in the lower tidal reaches of the river, the peak of the flood combined with a high spring tide to flood villages and 2,000 properties in Gainsborough. River levels dropped when the floodbank at Morton breached, resulting in the flooding of some 78 mi^{2} (200 km^{2}; 50,000 acres) of farmland in the Trent valley.

Flooding on the Trent can also be caused by the effects of storm surges independently of fluvial flows, a series of which occurred during October and November 1954, resulting in the worse tidal flooding experienced along the lower reaches. These floods revealed the need for a tidal protection scheme, which would cope with the flows experienced in 1947 and the tidal levels from 1954, and subsequently the floodbanks and defences along the lower river were improved to this standard with the works being completed in 1965. In December 2013, the largest storm surge since the 1950s occurred on the Trent, when a high spring tide combined with strong winds and a low pressure weather system, produced elevated tidal river levels in the lower reaches. The resulting surge overtopped the flood defences in the area near Keadby and Burringham, flooding 50 properties.

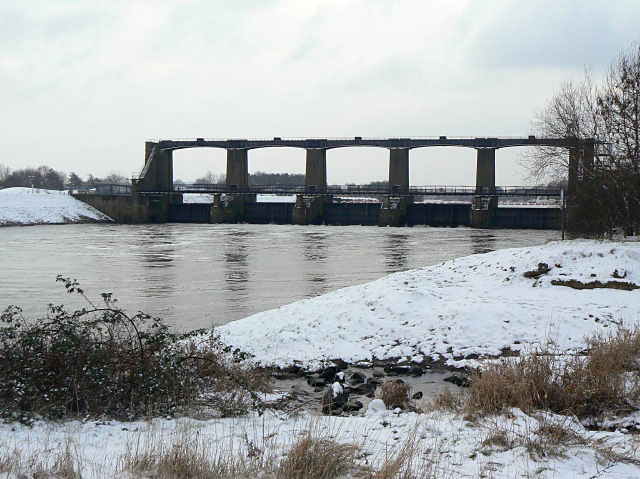
Holme Sluices: part of the Nottingham flood defences

The fifth largest flood recorded at Nottingham occurred in November 2000, with widespread flooding of low-lying land along the Trent valley, including many roads and railways. The flood defences around Nottingham and Burton constructed during the 1950s, following the 1947 event, stopped any major urban flooding, but problems did occur in undefended areas such as Willington and Gunthorpe, and again at Girton where 19 houses were flooded. The flood defences in Nottingham that protect 16,000 homes and those in Burton where they prevent 7,000 properties from flooding were reassessed after this flood, and were subsequently improved between 2006 and 2012.

== History of navigation ==
Nottingham seems to have been the ancient head of navigation until the Restoration, due partly to the difficult navigation of the Trent Bridge. Navigation was then extended to Wilden Ferry, near to the more recent Cavendish Bridge, as a result of the efforts of the Fosbrooke family of Shardlow.

River Trent Navigation Act 1698
- Act of Parliament
- Parliament of England
- Long title: An Act for makeing and keeping the River Trent in the River Trent in the Counties of Leicester Derby and Stafford navigable.
- Citation: 10 Will. 3 c. 26 (Note: This is the citation in The Statutes of the Realm.); 10 & 11 Will. 3. c. 20 (Note: This is the citation in The Statutes at Large.)
- Territorial extent: England and Wales

Dates
- Royal assent: 4 May 1699
- Commencement: 6 December 1698 (Note: Start of session.)
Other legislation
Relates to	Aire and Calder Navigation Act 1698; Trent Navigation Act 1773; Trent Navigation Act 1783

Status: Current legislation

Text of statute as originally enacted

Later, in 1699, the baron William Paget (Lord Paget), who owned coal mines and land in the area, obtained an act of Parliament, the River Trent Navigation Act 1698 (10 Will. 3. c. 26), to extend navigation up to Fleetstones Bridge, Burton, despite opposition from the people of Nottingham. Lord Paget seems to have funded the work privately, building locks at King's Mill and Burton Mills and several cuts and basins. The act gave him absolute control over the building of any wharves and warehouses above Nottingham Bridge. Lord Paget leased the navigation and the wharf at Burton to George Hayne, while the wharf and warehouses at Wilden were leased by Leonard Fosbrooke, who held the ferry rights and was a business partner of Hayne. The two men refused to allow any cargo to be landed which was not carried in their own boats, and so created a monopoly.

In 1748, merchants from Nottingham attempted to end this monopoly by landing goods on the banks and into carts, but Fosbrooke used his ferry rope to block the river, and then created a bridge by mooring boats across the channel, and employing men to defend them. Hayne subsequently scuppered a barge in King's Lock, and for the next eight years goods had to be transhipped around it. Despite a Chancery injunction against them, the two men continued with their action. Hayne's lease expired in 1762, and Lord Paget's son, the Earl of Uxbridge, gave the new lease to the Burton Boat Company.

The Trent and Mersey Canal was authorised by the Trent and Mersey Canal Act 1766 (6 Geo. 3. c. 96), and construction from Shardlow to Preston Brook, where it joined the Bridgewater Canal, was completed by 1777. The canal ran parallel to the upper river to Burton upon Trent, where new wharfs and warehouses at Horninglow served the town, and the Burton Boat Company was unable to repair the damaged reputation of the river created by its predecessors. Eventually, in 1805, the company reached an agreement with Henshall & Co., the leading canal carriers, for the closure of the river above Wilden Ferry. Though the river is no doubt legally still navigable above Shardlow, it is probable that the agreement marks the end of the use of that stretch of the river as a commercial navigation.

=== The lower river ===
Trent Navigation Act 1773
- Act of Parliament
- Parliament of Great Britain
- Long title: An Act for improving and completing the Navigation of that Branch of the River Trent which runs by the Town of Newark upon Trent, from a Place called The Upper Wear, in the Parish of Averham, in the County of Nottingham, to a Place called The Crankleys, in the Parish of South Muskham, in the said County.
- Citation: 13 Geo. 3. c. 86
- Territorial extent: Great Britain

Dates
- Royal assent: 24 December 1772
- Commencement: 26 November 1772

Status: Current legislation

Text of statute as originally enacted

The first improvement of the lower river was at Newark, where the channel splits into two. The residents of the town wanted to increase the use of the branch nearest to them, and so the Trent Navigation Act 1773 (13 Geo. 3. c. 86) was obtained in December 1772 to authorise the work. Newark Navigation Commissioners were created, with powers to borrow money to fund the construction of two locks, and to charge tolls for boats using them. The work was completed by October 1773, and the separate tolls remained in force until 1783, when they were replaced by a one-shilling (5p) toll whichever channel the boats used.

Users of the Trent and Mersey Canal, the Loughborough Canal and the Erewash Canal next demanded major improvements to the river down to Gainsborough, including new cuts, locks, dredging and a towing path suitable for horses. The Dadfords, who were engineers on the Trent and Mersey Canal, estimated the cost at £20,000, but the proposal was opposed by landowners and merchants on the river, while the Navigator, published in 1788, estimated that around 500 men who were employed to bow-haul boats would have lost their jobs. Agreement could not be reached, and so William Jessop was asked to re-assess the situation. He suggested that dredging, deepening, and restricting the width of the channel could make significant improvements to the navigable depth, although cuts would be required at Wilford, Nottingham bridge and Holme. This proposal formed the basis for the Trent Navigation Act 1783 (23 Geo. 3. c. 41), which also allowed a horse towing path to be built. The work was completed by September 1787, and dividends of 5 per cent were paid on the capital during 1786 and 1787, increasing to 7 per cent, the maximum allowed by the act, after that. Jessop carried out a survey for a side cut and lock at Sawley in 1789, and it was built by 1793.

At the beginning of the 1790s, the navigation faced calls for a bypass of the river at Nottingham, where the passage past Trent Bridge was dangerous, and the threat of a canal running parallel to the river, which was proposed by the Erewash and the Trent and Mersey Canal companies. In order to retain control of the whole river, they supported the inclusion of the Beeston Cut in the bill for the Nottingham Canal, which prevented the Erewash Canal company from getting permission to build it, and then had the proposal removed from the Nottingham Canal company's bill in return for their support of the main bill. The parallel canal was thwarted in May 1793, when they negotiated the withdrawal of the canal bill by proposing a thorough survey of the river which would result in their own legislation being put before Parliament. William Jessop performed the survey, assisted by Robert Whitworth, and they published their report on 8 July 1793. The major proposals included a cut and lock at Cranfleet, where the River Soar joins the Trent; a cut, locks and weirs at Beeston, which would connect with the Nottingham Canal at Lenton; and a cut and lock at Holme Pierrepont. The River Trent Navigation Act 1794 (34 Geo. 3. c. 95) was obtained, and the existing proprietors subscribed the whole of the authorised capital of £13,000 (equivalent to £1,500,000 in 2025), themselves.

The aim of the improvements was to increase the minimum depth from 2 feet (0.6 m) to 3 feet (0.9 m). By early 1796, the Beeston cut was operational, with the Cranfleet cut following in 1797, and the Holme cut in 1800, with the whole works being finished by 1 September 1801. The cost exceeded the authorised capital by a large margin, with the extra being borrowed, but the company continued to pay a 7 per cent dividend on the original shares and on those created to finance the new work. In 1823 and again in 1831, the Newark Navigation Commissioners proposed improvements to the river, so that larger vessels could be accommodated, but the Trent Navigation Company were making a good profit, and did not see the need for such work.

=== Competition ===
Trent Navigation Act 1884
- Act of Parliament
- Parliament of the United Kingdom
- Long title: An Act to provide for the effectual maintenance of the Navigation of the River Trent from Wilden Ferry in the counties of Derby and Leicester or one of them to Gainsborough in the county of Lincoln.
- Citation: 47 & 48 Vict. c. xxxviii
- Territorial extent: United Kingdom

Dates
- Royal assent: 19 May 1884
- Commencement: 19 May 1884 (Note: The Acts of Parliament (Commencement) Act 1793.)

Status: Current legislation

The arrival of the railways resulted in significant change for the company. Tolls were reduced to retain the traffic, wages were increased to retain the workforce, and the company sought amalgamation with a railway company. The proposed Nottingham and Gainsborough Railway offered £100 per share during 1845, but this was rejected. Tolls decreased from £11,344 (equivalent to £1,020,000 in 2025), during 1839 to £3,111 (equivalent to £290,000 in 2025), in 1855. Many of the connecting waterways were bought by railway companies, and gradually fell into disrepair. In an attempt to improve the situation, the company toyed with the idea of cable-hauled steam tugs, but instead purchased a conventional steam dredger and some steam tugs. The cost of improvements was too great for the old company, and so the Trent Navigation Act 1884 (47 & 48 Vict. c. xxxviii) was obtained restructure the company and raise additional capital. Failure to raise much of the capital resulted in another act of Parliament, the Trent (Burton-upon-Trent and Humber) Navigation Act 1887 (50 & 51 Vict. c. cxv), being obtained, with similar aims and similar results. The Trent Navigation Act 1892 (55 & 56 Vict. c. cxxxv) reverted the name to the Trent Navigation Company, and this time, some improvements were performed.

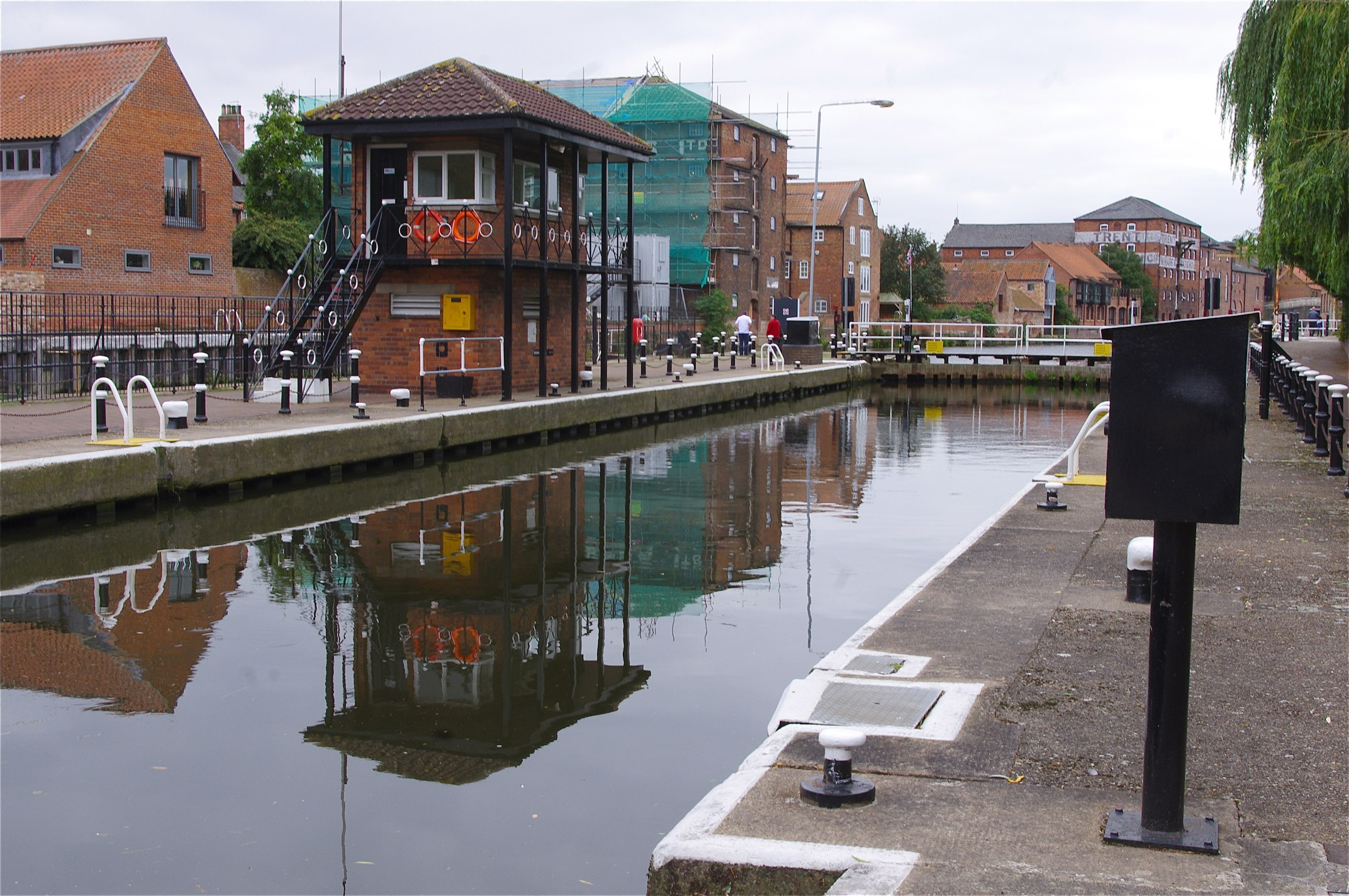
Newark Town Lock

With traffic still between 350,000 and 400,000 tonnes per year, Frank Rayner became the engineer in 1896, and the company were persuaded that major work was necessary if the navigation was to survive. The engineer for the Manchester Ship Canal, Sir Edward Leader Williams, was commissioned to survey the river, while negotiations with the North Staffordshire Railway, who owned the Trent and Mersey Canal and had maintained its viability, ensured that some of the clauses from previous acts of Parliament did not prevent progress. A plan to build six locks between Cromwell and Holme, and to dredge this section to ensure it was 60 feet (18 m) wide and 5 feet (1.5 m) deep was authorised by the Trent Navigation Act 1906 (6 Edw. 7. c. lvii). Raising finance was difficult, but some was subscribed by the chairman and vice-chairman, and construction of Cromwell Lock began in 1908. The Newark Navigation Commissioners financed improvements to Newark Town lock at the same time, and dredging of the channel was largely funded by selling the 400,000 tonnes of gravel removed from the river bed. At 188 by 30 feet (57.3 by 9.1 m), Cromwell lock could hold a tug and three barges, and was opened on 22 May 1911. The transport of petroleum provided a welcome increase to trade on the river, but little more work was performed before the beginning of the First World War.

=== Modernisation ===
Increased running costs after the First World War could not be met by increasing the tolls, as the company had no statutory powers to do so, and so suggested that the Ministry of Transport should take over the navigation, which they did from 24 September 1920. Tolls were increased, and a committee recommended improvements to the river. Nottingham Corporation invested some £450,000 on building the locks authorised by the Trent Navigation Act 1906 (6 Edw. 7. c. lvii), starting with Holme lock on 28 September 1921, and finishing with Hazelford lock, which was formally opened by Neville Chamberlain on 25 June 1926. A loan from Nottingham Corporation and a grant from the Unemployment Grants Committee enabled the company to rebuild Newark Nether lock, which was opened on 12 April 1926.

During the early 1930s, the company considered enlarging the navigation above Nottingham, in conjunction with improvements to the River Soar Navigation, between Trent Lock and Leicester. There were also negotiations with the London and North Eastern Railway, who were responsible for the Nottingham Canal between Trent Lock and Lenton. Plans for new larger locks at Beeston and Wilford were abandoned when the Trent Catchment Board opposed them. The Grand Union refused to improve the Soar Navigation, because the Trent Navigation Company could not guarantee 135,000 tons of additional traffic. The company also considered a plan to reopen the river to Burton, which would have involved the rebuilding of Kings Mills lock, and the construction of four new locks. An extra set of gates were added to Cromwell lock in 1935, effectively creating a second lock, while the Lenton to Trent Lock section was leased from the LNER in 1936, and ultimately purchased in 1946.

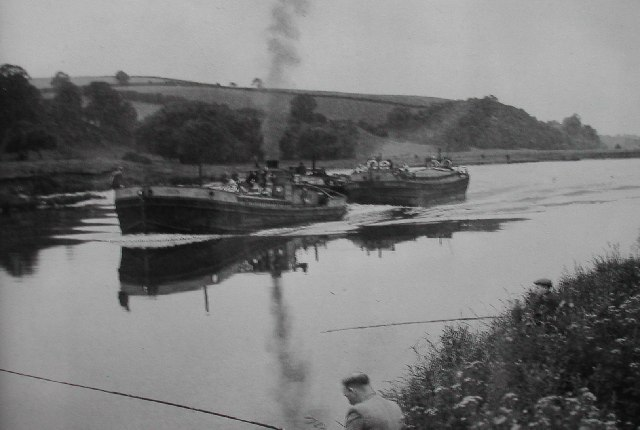
Barges near Hoveringham in 1954

Frank Rayner, who had been with the company since 1887, and had served as its engineer and later general manager since 1896, died in December 1945. Sir Ernest Jardine, who as vice-chairman had partly funded the first lock at Cromwell in 1908, died in 1947, and the company ceased to exist in 1948 when the waterways were nationalised. The last act of the directors was to pay a 7.5 per cent dividend on the shares in 1950. Having taken over responsibility for the waterway, the Transport Commission enlarged Newark Town lock in 1952, and the flood lock at Holme was removed to reduce the risk of flooding in Nottingham. More improvements followed between 1957 and 1960. The two locks at Cromwell became one, capable of holding eight Trent barges, dredging equipment was updated, and several of the locks were mechanised. Traffic increased from 620,000 tonnes during 1951 to 1,017,356 tonnes during 1964, but all of this was below Nottingham. Commercial carrying above Nottingham ceased during the 1950s, to be replaced by pleasure cruising.

Although commercial use of the river has declined, the lower river between Cromwell and Nottingham can still take large motor barges up to around 150 feet (46 m) in length with a capacity of approx 300 tonnes. Barges still transport gravel from pits at Girton and Besthorpe to Goole and Hull.

=== Navigation today ===
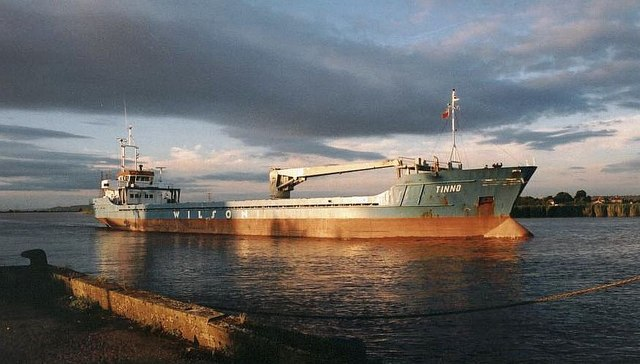
The aggregate carrier Tinno passing Keadby in 2002

The river is legally navigable for some 117 miles (188 km) below Burton upon Trent. However, for practical purposes, navigation above the southern terminus of the Trent and Mersey Canal (at Shardlow) is conducted on the canal, rather than on the river itself. The canal connects the Trent to the Potteries and on to Runcorn and the Bridgewater Canal.

Down river of Shardlow, the non-tidal river is navigable as far as the Cromwell Lock near Newark, except in Nottingham (Beeston Cut & Nottingham Canal) and just west of Nottingham, where there are two lengths of canal, Sawley and Cranfleet cuts. Below Cromwell lock, the Trent is tidal, and therefore only navigable by experienced, well-equipped boaters. Navigation lights and a proper anchor and cable are compulsory. Associated British Ports, the navigation authority for the river from Gainsborough to Trent Falls, insist that anyone in charge of a boat must be experienced at navigating in tidal waters.

Between Trent Falls and Keadby, coastal vessels that have navigated through the Humber still deliver cargoes to the wharves of Grove Port, Neap House, Keadby, Gunness and Flixborough. Restrictions on size mean that the largest vessels that can be accommodated are 100 m (330 ft) long and 4,500 tonnes. The use of a maritime pilot on the Trent is not compulsory for commercial craft, but is suggested for those without any experience of the river. Navigation can be difficult, and there have been a number of incidents with ships running aground and in one case, striking Keadby Bridge. The most recent occurrence involved the Celtic Endeavour being aground near Gunness for ten days, finally being lifted off by a high tide.

== Trent Aegir ==
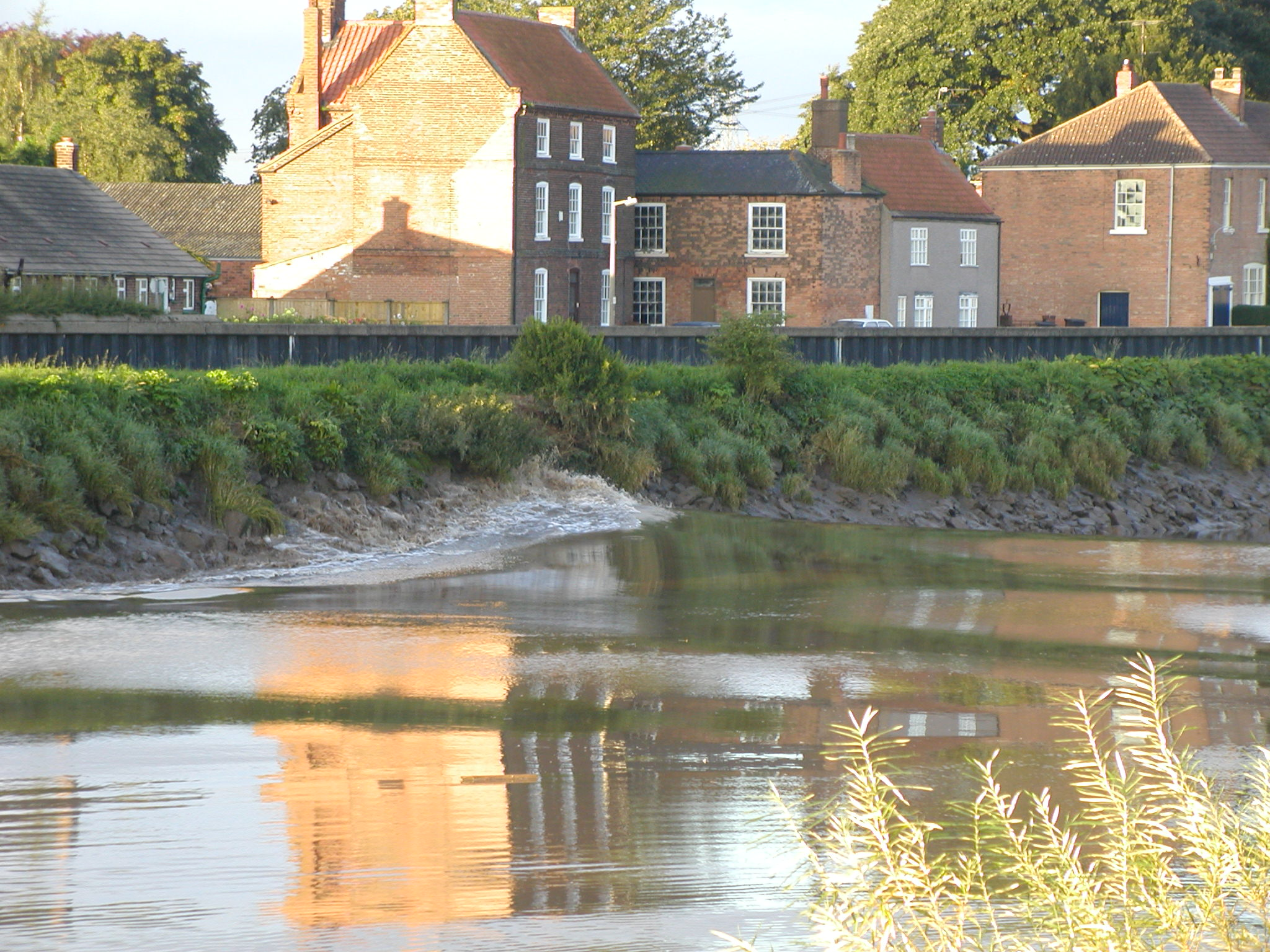
The Trent Aegir seen from West Stockwith, Nottinghamshire, 20 September 2005

At certain times of the year, the lower tidal reaches of the Trent experience a moderately large tidal bore (up to 5 feet [1.5 m] high), commonly known as the Trent Aegir (named after the Norse sea god). The Aegir occurs when a high spring tide meets the downstream flow of the river. The funnel shape of the river mouth exaggerates this effect, causing a large wave to travel upstream as far as Gainsborough, Lincolnshire, and sometimes beyond. The Aegir cannot travel much beyond Gainsborough as the shape of the river reduces the Aegir to little more than a ripple, and weirs north of Newark-on-Trent, Nottinghamshire, stop its path completely.

== The literal North/South divide ==
The Trent historically marked the boundary between Northern England and Southern England. For example, the administration of royal forests was subject to a different justice in eyre north and south of the river, and the jurisdiction of the medieval Council of the North started at the Trent. In addition to this, the University of Oxford was formerly divided into a northern nation and a southern nation, the former consisting of English people north of the River Trent and the Scots and the latter consisting of English people south of the Trent, the Irish, and the Welsh.

Some traces of the former division remain: the Trent marks the boundary between the provinces of two English Kings of Arms, Norroy and Clarenceux. This divide was also described in Michael Drayton's epic topographical poem, Poly-Olbion, The Sixe and Twentieth Song, 1622:

And of the British floods, though but the third I be,
Yet Thames and Severne both in this come short of me,
For that I am the mere of England, that divides
The north part from the south, on my so either sides,
that reckoning how these tracts in compasse be extent,
Men bound them on the north, or on the south of Trent

== Pollution history ==
It is not clear when pollution first became an issue for the River Trent, but in the late 1880s, it had a thriving salmon fishery, with the river producing an annual catch of some 3,000 fish, a decade later, this had fallen to 100. The collapse of the fishery was due to the rapid population increase of the towns that developed following the Industrial Revolution. The tipping point being the introduction of piped water and a basic sewer network, which meant that effluent, which was previously stored in cesspits, was carried away through drains into the nearest brook.

...the polluted state of the Trent is a terror to Trentham.

— Duke of Sutherland, describing the river in his injunction of 1902.

This was a particular problem in Stoke-on-Trent and the growing towns of the Potteries. Due to the relatively small size of the Trent and its tributaries such as the Fowlea Brook, which drained these towns, the river and brooks were unable to dilute the inflow of domestic sewage and soon became overwhelmed and badly polluted.

At the downstream end of the Potteries was Trentham Hall, here pollution became so bad that the owner, the Duke of Sutherland, made a claim against the local Fenton council in 1902. He also took out an injunction against the council to prevent the ongoing contamination causing a "most foul and offensive stench", the river not even being suitable to water grazing cattle on the estate.

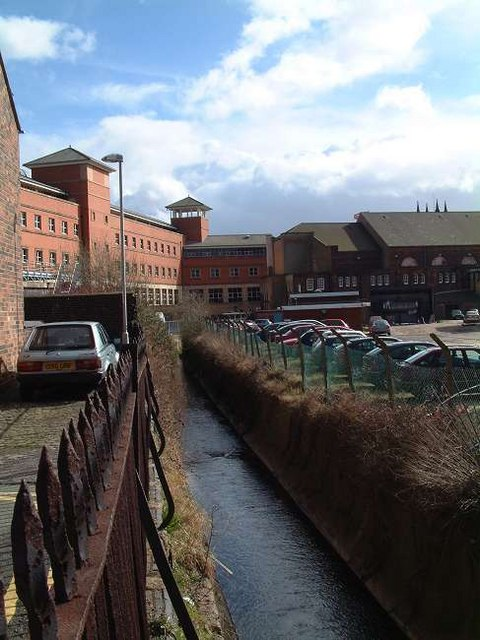
Fowlea Brook – once a very heavily polluted tributary of the Trent

Although he provided land for a sewage works nearby at Strongford, the problems continued such that in 1905 the Levenson-Gower family left Trentham altogether and moved to their other properties, including Dunrobin Castle in Scotland.

Until the outbreak of the Second World War, the main source of pollution continued to be the Potteries, although there was contamination from the Tame and other lower tributaries it was not as prominent. During the 1950s, however, the same problem of effluent dilution that occurred in Stoke began to become significant in Birmingham and the Black Country. Domestic effluent and polluting discharges from the metal working industries in the upper reaches, combined to affect the whole length of the tributary River Tame.

The Tame pollution also reached the Trent as well, with one of the worse affected reaches being that downstream of the confluence with the Tame through Burton, this being exacerbated by its late introduction of sewage treatment, and the substantial wastewater arising from the breweries in the town. Angling clubs in Burton used the Dove or local lakes for fishing, as the Trent through the town was absent of any fish. Downstream, the inflow of cleaner water from the Dove and then the Derwent meant that conditions improved enough to allow recreational coarse fishing in the lower reaches.

The pollution of the "Trent catchment was probably at its worst in the late 1950s", this being the result of the ongoing industrialisation of the urban areas, combined with the interruption and under investment caused by two world wars, which lead to only piecemeal improvements of the sewerage treatment infrastructure taking place. One effect of this pollution was that the upper and middle reaches were completely devoid of any fish life.

I received this morning a letter from the secretary of a Burton rowing club.
Last Thursday, its senior eight were out rowing when
members of the crew were seized with pains in the chest.
This was caused by fumes rising from the river.

— John Jennings MP for Burton-upon-Trent, 1956.

John Jennings, the local MP for Burton highlighted these problems in a speech to the House when he stated in 1956, that as in previous years the river had been declared unsafe for swimming on advice from the medical officer, and how its unhealthy condition affected a local rowing club.

From the 1960s onwards, there were gradual but steady improvements to the inadequate sewage works and sewers built during the Victorian era in the urban areas, but this was expensive, and took time to complete. The changes were helped by the introduction of more stringent pollution control legislation, which required industrial waste to be discharged to sewers, and the formation of the Trent River Authority, which had new duties relating to managing water quality issues. Other changes, such as the replacement of town gas with natural gas, saw the end of the polluting and toxic coal tar emissions to rivers in 1963.

In 1970, Mr Jennings again raised the issue of pollution through Burton, the River Tame continuing to be a source of the problem, and further improvements were promised. The responsibility for sewage treatment works still belonged primarily to local authorities, which often meant an uncoordinated approach and a proliferation of small works. In 1974, these works were transferred to the regional water authorities, with the Severn Trent Water Authority taking over the role for the Trent catchment. This led to increased investment, the closure of older and smaller works, with sewage treatment being combined at larger modern works such as Strongford and Minworth.

The economic recession in the 1970s meant that there was a considerable contraction of heavy industrial sectors, reducing pollution loadings from factories and foundries. Later improvements such as the series of purification lakes that were constructed on the Tame in the 1980s, which allowed contaminated sediment to settle out from the river, also reduced pollution levels, and lessened the impact of first flush runoff events in the lower Tame and the middle Trent.

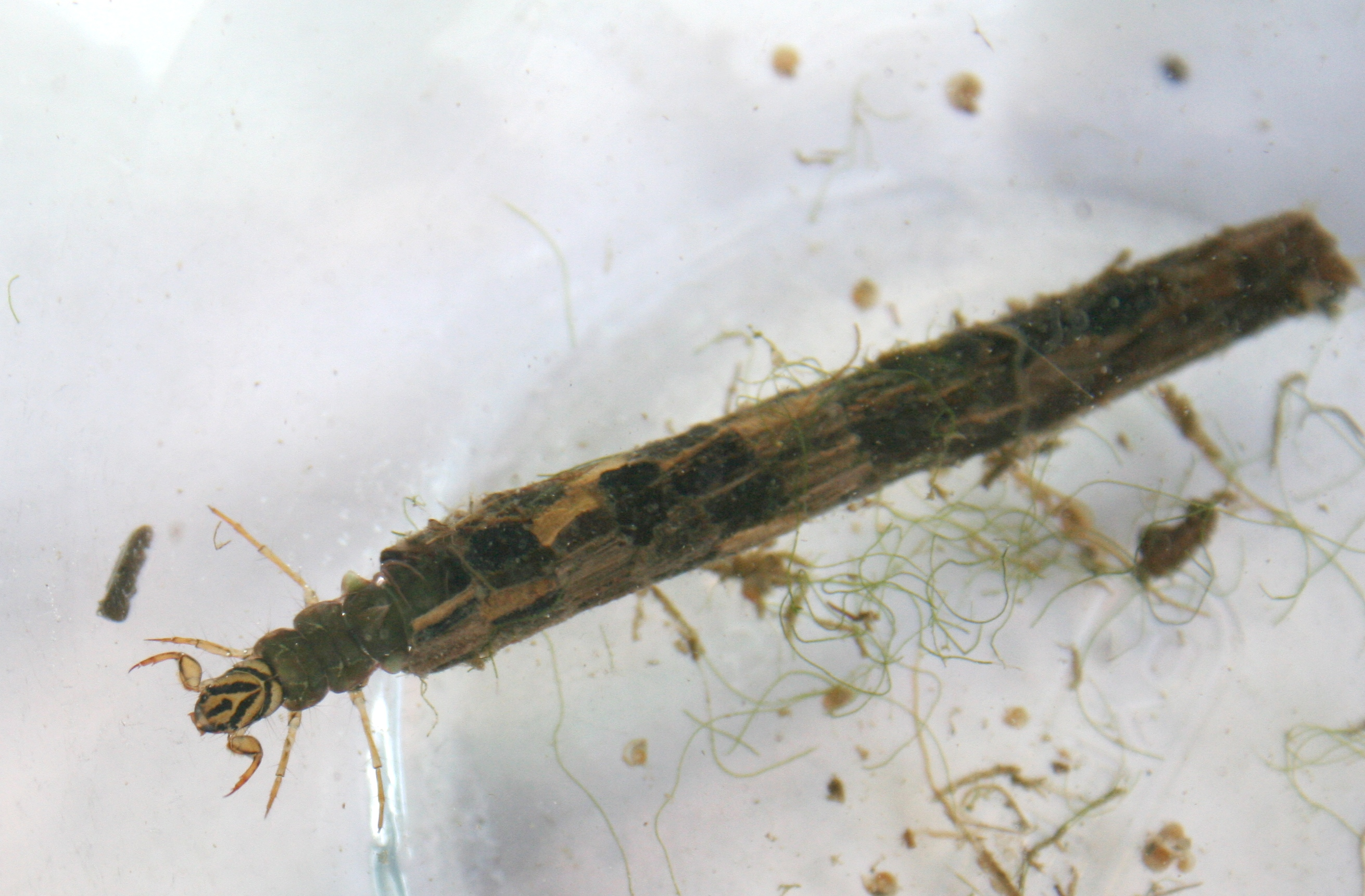
Caddisfly larva, intolerant of pollution, are used as an indicator species in the Trent Biotic index

The improvements in water quality along the Trent were recorded through the chemical monitoring of the river from the 1950s. Polluting substances such as ammonia showed a reduction, as did the biochemical oxygen demand, an indicator of the contamination present in the river. There were corresponding increases in dissolved oxygen, an indicator of a healthy river environment. The programme of monitoring also extended to taking biological samples, and one of the first biotic indices used for assessing the ecological rather than the chemical quality of rivers was developed by the local river board in the 1960s. Using invertebrates as an indicator of pollution levels, it was appropriately named the Trent Biotic index.

By 2004, it was reported that the Trent was cleaner than it had been in the last 70–80 years, and that episodic incidents of pollution had also reduced considerably since the 1970s. The river remains vulnerable to these pollution events, such as the one that occurred in October 2009 when an accidental release of cyanide from a factory into the sewer system in Stoke-on-Trent, affected the treatment works at Strongford. This resulted in the release of raw sewage and the chemical into the river, killing thousands of fish, and posing a health risk to river users as far south as Burton.

Although now considered cleaner, there are still problems with diffuse pollution from agricultural runoff and urban areas, as well as point source contamination from sewage works. The improvements that have taken place mean that the Trent can be used for public water consumption. Riverside lakes near Shardlow act as a reserve water source for Nottingham and Derby, and water is also abstracted at Torksey and Newton-on-Trent for supplies in Lincolnshire.

== Wildlife and ecology ==
Artificial changes along the Trent, due to navigation, farming, mineral extraction and drainage works, mean that much of the riparian landscape has been altered, reducing the amount of natural habitat. The river channel links the remaining, but fragmented wetland areas and nature reserves, providing a refuge for native and migrant species. These include wildfowl and wading birds that use the Trent Valley as a migration corridor, with the river also being used as a wildlife route by mammals such as otters and non-native American mink. It forms part of the Severn-Trent flyway, a route used by migratory birds to cross Great Britain.

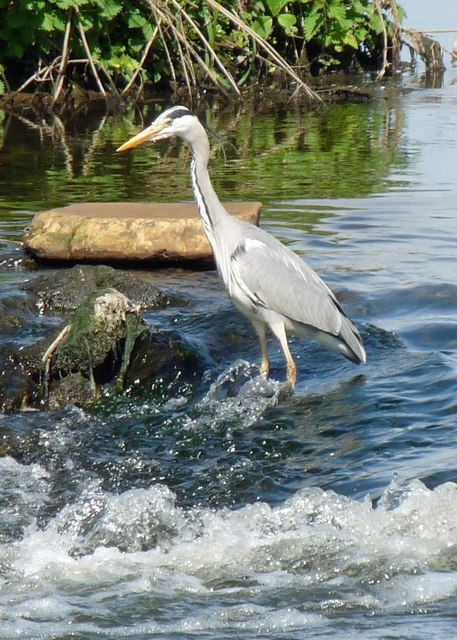
Grey heron fishing in the Trent

Additional nature conservation areas were created beside the river in the 20th century, when a number of disused gravel pits, were rehabilitated as nature reserves. One of the most important of these is Attenborough Nature Reserve, a 226-hectare (560-acre) Site of Special Scientific Interest (SSSI) which is visited by wildfowl such as Eurasian wigeon and common teal. Wading birds such as Eurasian oystercatcher and great bittern have also been observed at the reserve; as have kingfishers, reed warblers and water rails.

Other managed wetland sites along the river include Beckingham Marshes, Croxall Lakes, Drakelow, and Willington Gravel Pits. At Besthorpe near Newark, breeding pairs of little egrets and grey herons have been observed.

The Trent valley also links together other SSSI and local nature reserves, which have varying habitats not only for birds, but also mammals, insects and fish, a good example is the tributary River Mease where the entire watercourse has been designated both as a SSSI and a European special area of conservation.

One of the more unusual ecological sites is Pasturefields nature reserve near Hixon, an inland saltmarsh, which is a rare habitat for the UK. A vestige of the saline marshes created by the brine springs that seep from the groundwater of the Mercia mudstones, the reserve contains salt tolerant species normally found on the coast, such as sea plantain, arrowgrass and milkwort.

Improvements in water quality and subsequent fish stocks, in combination with the ban on the use of certain persistent pesticides have meant that otters have now returned to the Trent system, having been absent as recently as the 1980s. A survey in 2003 showed a doubling in the number of sites where evidence, such as spraints and footprints of these elusive animals were found. They have also now been sighted at locations such as Wolseley, Willington, and Attenborough. Seals have been reported up to near the head of the tidal section at Newark.

== Fishing ==
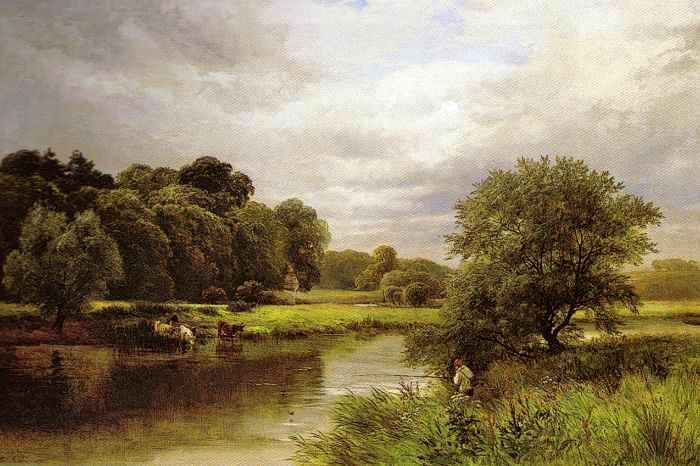
Fishing on the Trent near Ingleby by George Turner, 1850

Evidence of fishing along the Trent can be traced back to the Neolithic period, with the possible remnants of a fish weir discovered in the abandoned river channels at Hemington. More definitive finds from the medieval period were also found at this site and near Colwick. These consisted of V-shaped alignments of stakes; wattle panels and a large wicker trap and demonstrate that passive fishing techniques were in use on the river.

The Domesday catalogue showed that there were many successful mills and fisheries along the Trent. Mills were important locations for fish and eel traps, the eels being caught during 'quill time' between mid-August and early September. Written records show that in the 12th century landlords were paid in salmon, in lieu of rent at Burton upon Trent.

In the 17th century, Izaak Walton described the River Trent as 'One of the finest rivers in the world and the most abounding with excellent salmon and all sorts of delicate fish.' A list composed in 1641 for the Trent, contained thirty types of fish and other species including those that migrated from the sea such as shad, smelt, salmon and flounder, and riverine species such as trout, grayling, perch and pike.

The largest of those listed was the sturgeon, which at one time were caught in the Trent as far upstream as King's Mill, but only in low numbers. Particular examples included one of 8 feet (2.4 m) taken near Donington castle in 1255, and another at King's Mill of 7 feet (2.1 m) in 1791. The last known catch was in 1902 near Holme, the fish was 8 1/2 feet (2.6 m) and weighed 250 pounds (110 kg).

The effluent and industrial pollution of the early 20th century, led to a rapid decline in fish stocks, large stretches of the river became fishless and species such as salmon almost disappeared. As water quality improved from the 1960s onwards, fish numbers recovered, and recreational coarse fishing became more popular.

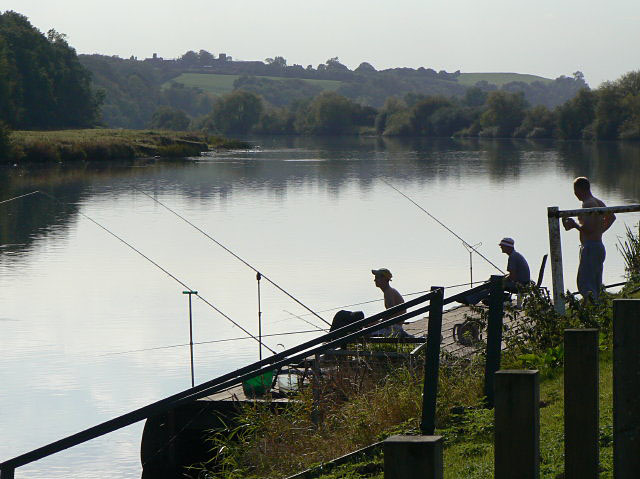
Fishing on the Trent near Hazelford Ferry, 2009

By the 1970s the Trent was regarded as 'one of the most productive rivers in the British Isles'. by anglers, who would travel from South Yorkshire and other surrounding areas, to fish the Trent as their local rivers still remained badly polluted and were absent of fish.

Analysis of catch returns from 1969 to 1985, showed that the fish caught most often by anglers were barbel, bream, bleak, carp, chub, dace, eel, gudgeon, perch, and roach. Over the study period the returns revealed that there was a variation in the species caught, with a shift from roach and dace based catches, to one of chub and bream, a change that was perceived by anglers to represent a 'serious detriment' to the fishery. This led to comments that the river had become 'too clean for its fish', and its popularity, especially for match fishing, declined from the mid-1980s. Competition from other fisheries such as well stocked ponds and lakes with better amenities and more consistent catches of fish also meant a reduction in the appeal of fishing the Trent.

Recreational fishing is still popular, although anglers no longer line the banks as they once did. There are many fishing clubs that use the river, with catches including barbel, bream, carp, chub, dace, pike, and roach.

Salmon, a species that became virtually extinct due to historic pollution, have been progressively reintroduced on the tributaries since 1998, with thousands of salmon parr being released into the Dove and its tributary the Churnet each year. Returning adult salmon have been seen leaping over weirs on the river and in 2011 a large salmon weighing over 10 pounds (4.5 kg) was caught at an undisclosed location, and was 'thought to be the biggest caught on the Trent in the last thirty years'.

== Places along the Trent ==
Map showing riverside towns and cities along the course of the Trent

Cities and towns on or close to the river include:

- Stoke-on-Trent
- Stone
- Rugeley
- Burton upon Trent
- Castle Donington
- Long Eaton
- Beeston
- Nottingham
- Newark-on-Trent
- Gainsborough

== Crossing the Trent ==
Prior to the mid-18th century there were few permanent crossings of the river with only four bridges downstream of the Tame confluence: the old medieval bridges at Burton, Swarkestone, Nottingham (known as Hethbeth Bridge) and Newark, all first built by 1204. There were, however, over thirty ferries that operated along its course, and numerous fords, where passage was possible, their locations indicated by the suffix 'ford' in many riverside place-names such as Hanford, Bridgford, and Wilford.

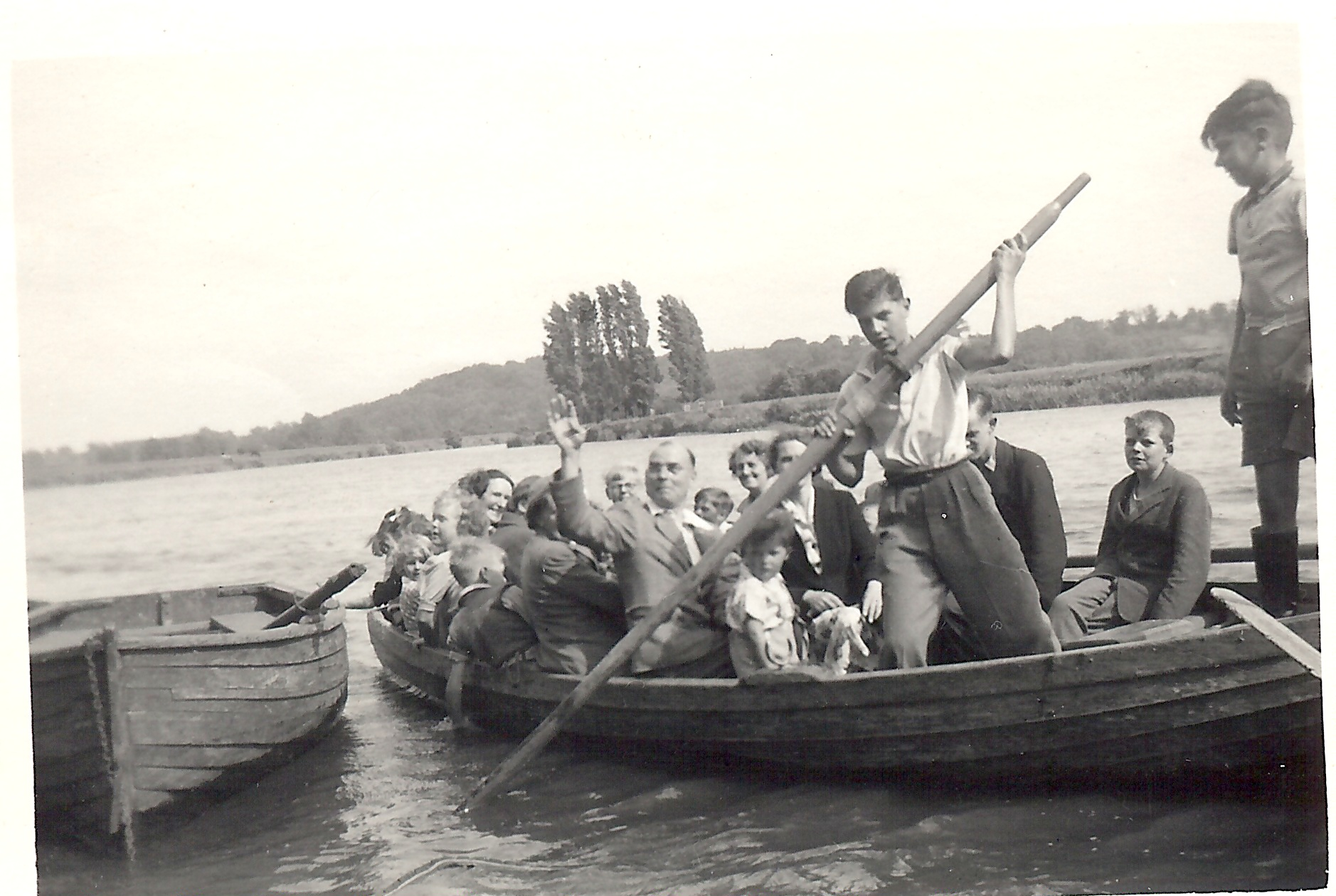
Barton Ferry in 1949

Glover noted in 1829 that all three types of crossing were still in use on the Derbyshire section of the Trent, but that the fords were derelict and dangerous. These fording points only allowed passage across the river when water levels were low; when the river was in flood a long detour could be required. He reported that they could be treacherous to the unwary, since there were few gauges to show if the river had become too deep to cross, and that they were rarely used except by locals. One of the earliest known fords was the crossing at Littleborough, constructed by the Romans it was paved with flagstones, and supported by substantial timber pilings. The importance of these fords was demonstrated by their inclusion in the 1783 navigation Act, which limited any dredging at these sites so that they remained less than 2 feet (0.61 m) deep.

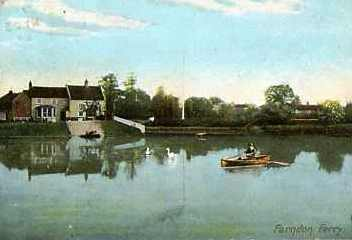
Farndon ferry in 1907 showing the white frontage of the Britannia Inn

Ferries often replaced these earlier fording points, and were essential where the water was too deep, such as the tidal section of the lower river. As they were a source of income, they were recorded in the Domesday Book at a number of locations including Weston on Trent and Fiskerton, both of which were still in operation in the middle of the 20th century. The ferry boats used along the Trent ranged in size from small rowing boats, to flat decked craft that could carry livestock, horses, and in some case their associated carts or wagons.

Bridges over the river were created in Saxon times at Nottingham at least (and for a time just north of Newark at Cromwell, although it is not known how long that bridge site lasted), and formed major centres of trade and military importance. King Edward fortified the Nottingham bridge in 920, while a notable battle took place at Burton's bridge in 1322, and another in 1643. The medieval bridges of Burton and Nottingham survived relatively intact until the 1860s, when both were replaced and demolished. The central arches of the medieval Swarkestone bridge were knocked out by the great flood of 1795 and rebuilt, but the bridge's more rural location allowed large portions of the medieval bridge to survive and remain in use today. Crossing a wide flood plain, the bridge is almost one mile (1.6 km) long, a laborious project to allow flood waters to pass under it. At Newark, the last bridge on the Trent until modern times, the bridge was rebuilt in 1775. At least one other medieval attempt was made to bridge the Trent near Wilden at Hemington, but this was gone long before the end of the Middle Ages. The complex of three bridges provides evidence of attempts to keep a crossing open over slightly more than two hundred years from 1097, with three bridges constructed on the same site but felled by scouring, floods and course migration of the river to the south eroding the bridgehead. The bridge was probably gone by around 1311 when nearby Wilden ferry, near Shardlow was first recorded, and the site thereafter went without a bridge until Cavendish Bridge opened around 1760. As no archive sources record that the Hemington bridge existed, there may have been other medieval bridge projects now forgotten. (Until the late 18th century, a long period of stagnation for economic and technical reasons limited the number of bridges over the Trent; it has been noted that relatively few bridges were constructed in England on new sites anywhere between around 1250–1300 and 1750.) Cavendish Bridge was itself damaged beyond repair by a flood in March 1947, requiring a temporary Bailey bridge to be used until a new concrete span was constructed in 1957.

When bridge construction resumed, toll bridges were often constructed on the site of ferry routes. Such was the case at Willington, Gunthorpe and Gainsborough.

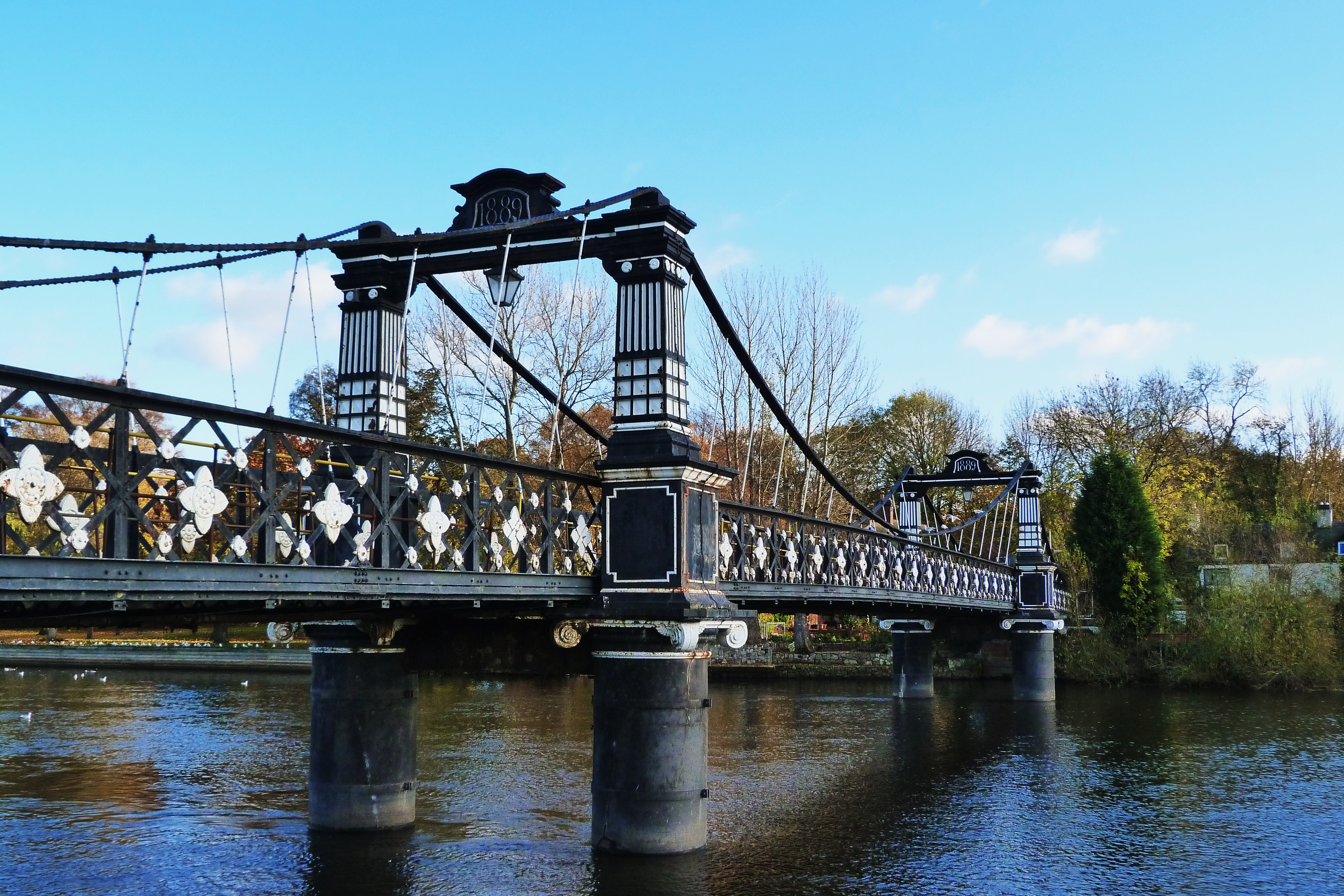
Ferry Bridge built in 1889, crosses the river between Stapenhill and Burton

At Stapenhill near Burton, there were similar calls for a new bridge, a tally of usage showed that the foot ferry was being used 700 times per day. The new Ferry Bridge was opened in 1889, although it needed the financial support of the brewer and philanthropist Michael Bass to pay for the construction, and later in 1898 to purchase the existing ferry rights so that it became free of tolls.

The toll bridges were mostly bought out by the county councils in the 19th century following government reforms, one of the earliest being Willington in 1898, the first toll free crossing was marked by a procession across the bridge and a day of celebration. The only toll bridge that remains across the Trent is at Dunham, although it is free to cross on Christmas and Boxing Day.

== Power stations ==
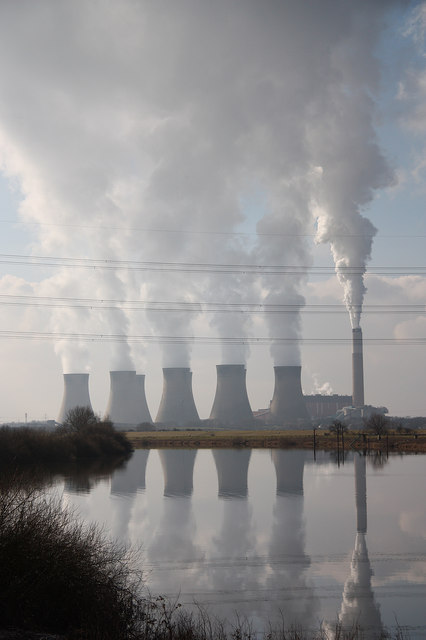
Cottam Power Station

The tall chimneys and concave-shaped cooling towers of the many power stations are a take up the skyline within the otherwise open landscape of the Trent valley, which has been used for power generation since the 1940s.

The primary reason for locating so many generating stations beside the Trent was the availability of sufficient amounts of cooling water from the river. This, combined with the nearby supplies of fuel in the form of coal from the Nottinghamshire and Yorkshire coalfields, and the existing railway infrastructure, led to a string of twelve large power stations being constructed along its banks. At one time these sites provided a quarter of the electricity needs of the UK, giving rise to the epithet 'Megawatt Valley'.

Once these early stations reached the end of their functional life, they were usually demolished, although in some cases the sites have been retained and redeveloped as gas fired power stations.

In downstream order, the power stations that have used the river as their source of cooling water are: Meaford, Rugeley, Drakelow, Willington, Castle Donington, Ratcliffe-on-Soar, Wilford, Staythorpe, High Marnham, Cottam, West Burton and Keadby.

There is one hydroelectric power station on the river, Beeston Hydro at Beeston Weir.

== Recreation on the Trent ==
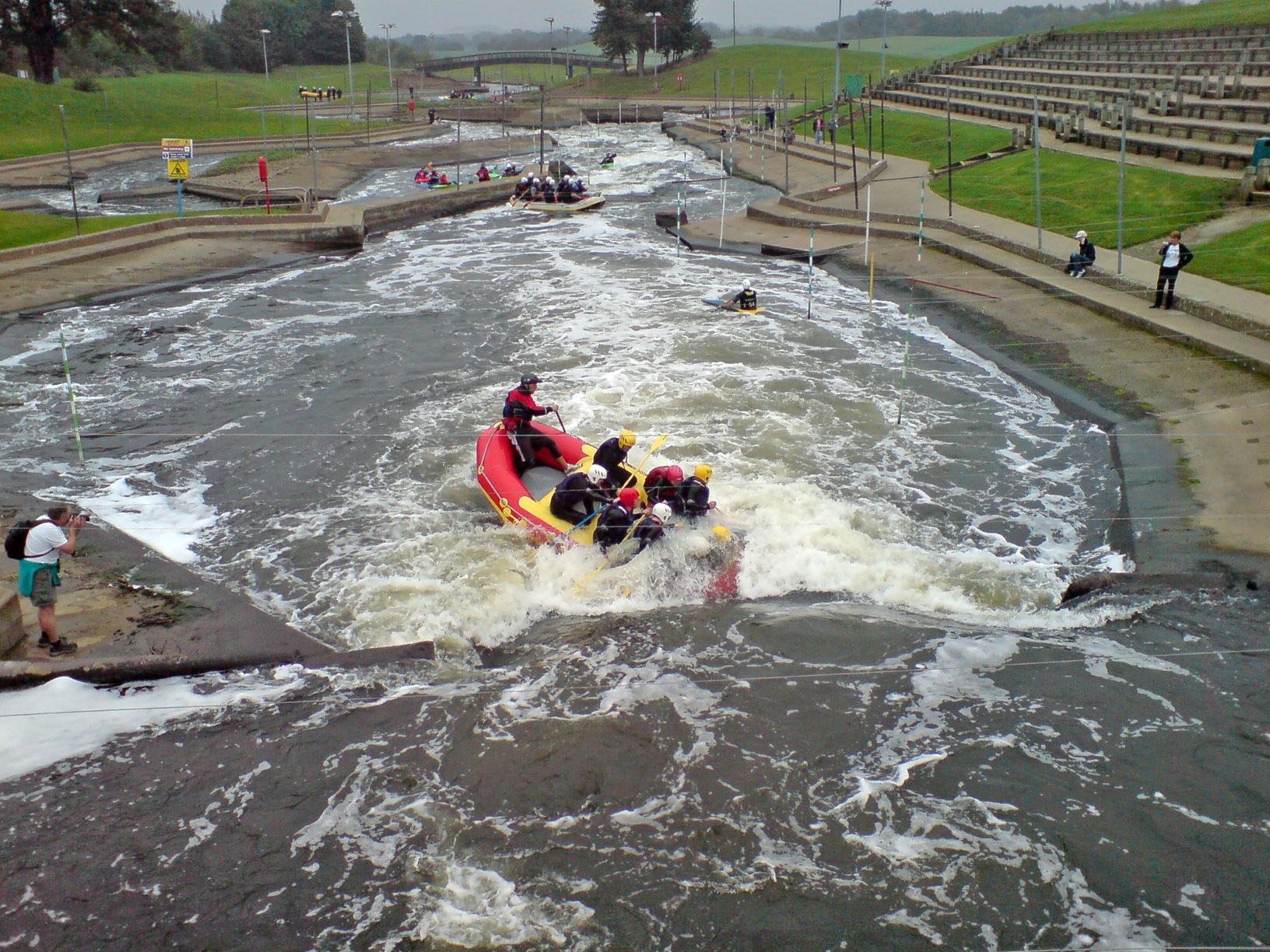
Holme Pierrepont National Watersports Centre in Nottingham next to the River Trent

Along with other major rivers in the Midlands, the Trent is widely used for recreational activities, both on the water and along its riverbanks. The National Watersports Centre at Holme Pierrepont, near Nottingham combines facilities for many of these sports, including rowing, sailing and whitewater canoeing.

The Trent Valley Way created in 1998 as a long-distance footpath, enables walkers to enjoy the combined attractions of 'the river's rich natural heritage and its history as an inland navigation'. Extended in 2012, the route now runs from Trent Lock in the south through to Alkborough where the river meets the Humber. It combines riverside and towpath sections, with other paths to villages and places of interest in the wider valley.

Swimming in the river was once popular; in 1770 at Nottingham there were two bathing areas on opposite banks at Trent Bridge which were improved in 1857 with changing sheds and an assistant. Similar facilities were present in 1870 on the water meadows at Burton-on-Trent, which also had its own swimming club. Open water swimming still takes place at locations including Colwick Park Lake adjacent to the river, with its own voluntary lifeguards. The first person to swim the entire swimmable length of the Trent was Tom Milner, who swam 139 miles (224 km) over nine days in July 2015.

Rowing clubs have existed at Burton, Newark and Nottingham since the mid-1800s, with various regattas taking place between them, both on the river and on the rowing course at the national watersports centre.

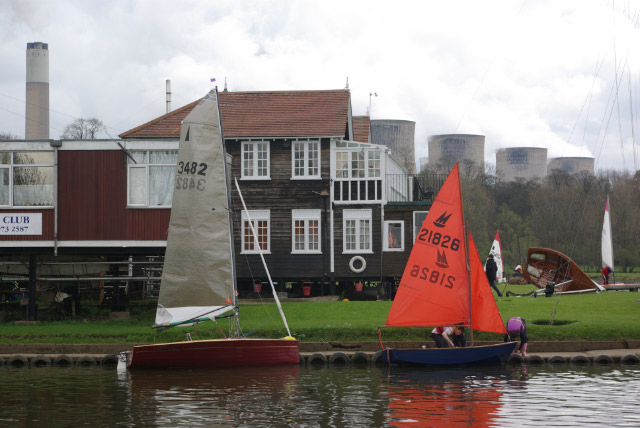
Trent Valley Sailing Club near Trent Lock

Both whitewater and flat water canoeing is possible on the Trent, with published guides and touring routes being listed for the river. There is a canoe slalom course at Stone, a purpose built 700 m (2,300 ft) artificial course at Holme Pierrepont, and various weirs including those at Newark and Sawley are all used for whitewater paddling. Various canoe and kayak clubs paddle on the river including those at Stone, Burton, and Nottingham.

The Trent Valley Sailing Club, established in 1886, is one of two clubs that use the river for dingy sailing, regattas, and events. There are also a number of clubs that sail on the open water that has been created as a result of flooded gravel workings which include Hoveringham, Girton, and Attenborough.

Organised trips on cruise boats have long been a feature of the Trent; at one time steam launches took passengers from Trent Bridge to Colwick Park. Similar trips run today but in reverse, starting from Colwick and passing through Nottingham they use boats known as the Trent Princess and Trent Lady. Other trips run from Newark castle, and two converted barges; the Newark Crusader and Nottingham Crusader, provide river cruises for disabled people via the St John Ambulance Waterwing scheme.

== Tributaries ==
Although, in the epic poem The Faerie Queene, Edmund Spenser endowed "The beauteous Trent" with "thirty different streams", the river is joined by more than twice that number of different tributaries; of these the largest in terms of flow is the Tame, which drains most of the West Midlands, including Birmingham and the Black Country. The second- and third-largest are the Derwent and the Dove respectively; together these two rivers drain the majority of Derbyshire and Staffordshire, including the upland areas of the Peak District.

The River Soar, which drains the majority of the county of Leicestershire, could also be considered as the second-largest tributary, for it has a larger catchment area than the Dove or Derwent; but its discharge is significantly less than the Derwent, and lower than the Dove.

Of the tributaries, the Derwent receives the highest annual average rainfall; the Devon, which has the lowest average rainfall, is the driest catchment of those tabulated.

Statistics of the Trent's largest tributaries
Name	County (Note: Indicative county shown)	Length		Catchment Area		Discharge		Rainfall (Note: Rainfall is Annual Average 1961–90 for the catchment to the Gauging Station)		Max. Altitude		Refs
		km	mi	km^{2}	mi^{2}	m^{3}/s	cfs	mm	in	m	ft	
Blithe	Staffs	47	29	167	64	1.16	41	782	30.8	281	922	(Note: Blithe measured at Hamstall Ridware)
Devon	Notts	47	29	377	146	1.57	55	591	23.3	170	560	(Note: Devon measured at Cotham – Altitude from Ordnance Survey Map)
Derwent	Derbys	118	73	1,204	465	18.58	656	982	38.7	634	2,080	(Note: Blithe measured at Church Wilne)
Dove	Derbys	96	60	1,020	390	13.91	491	935	36.8	546	1,791	(Note: Dove measured at Marston on Dove)
Erewash	Derbys	46	29	194	75	1.87	66	708	27.9	194	636	(Note: Erewash measured at Sandiacre)
Greet	Notts	18	11	66	25	0.30	11	655	25.8	153	502	(Note: Greet measured at Southwell)
Idle	Notts	55	34	896	346	2.35	83	650	26	205	673	(Note: Idle measured at Mattersey)
Leen	Notts	39	24	124	48	0.67	24	686	27.0	185	607	(Note: Leen measured at Triumph Road, Lenton)
Soar	Leics	95	59	1,386	535	11.73	414	641	25.2	272	892	(Note: Soar measured at Kegworth)
Sow	Staffs	38	24	601	232	6.33	224	714	28.1	234	768	(Note: Sow measured at Milford)
Tame	West Mids	95	59	1,500	580	27.84	983	691	27.2	291	955	(Note: Tame measured at Hopwas)
Torne	Lincs	44	27	361	139	0.89	31	615	24.2	145	476	(Note: Torne measured at Auckley)

=== List of tributaries ===
Tributaries of the Trent

Alphabetical listing of tributaries, extracted from the Water Framework Directive list of water bodies for the River Trent:

Tributary (Note: Tributary names from Ordnance Survey maps added where list amalgamated river reaches)	River Order (Note: River Order – 1 being closest to Trent Falls)	Joins Trent at	Bank
Adlingfleet Drain	1	Adlingfleet	Left
Amerton Brook	60	Shirleywich	Left
River Blithe	55	Nethertown	Left
Bottesford Beck	8	East Butterwick	Right
Bourne Brook	54	Kings Bromley	Right
Catchwater Drain	16	West Burton	Left
Causeley Brook	68	Hanley	Left
Causeway Dyke	31	Bleasby	Left
Chitlings Brook	66	Hanford	Left
Cuttle Brook	42	Swarkestone	Left
Cocker Beck	33	Gunthorpe	Left
Darklands Brook	48	Drakelow	Right
River Devon	27	Newark	Right
River Derwent, Derby	40	Shardlow	Left
River Dove	47	Newton Solney	Left
Dover Beck	32	Caythorpe	Left
River Eau	9	Barlings, Scotter	Right
River Erewash	38	Attenborough	Left
Eggington Brook	46	Willington	Left
Fairham Brook	37	Clifton Bridge	Right
Ferry Drain	11	Owston Ferry	Left
Fledborough Beck	22	Fledborough	Left
Folly Drain	6	Althorpe	Left
Ford Green Brook	69	Milton	Right
Fowlea Brook	67	Stoke	Right
Gayton Brook	61	Weston	Left
Grassthorpe Beck (Goosemoor Dyke)	24	Grassthorpe	Left
River Greet	29	Fiskerton	Left
Healeys Drain	7	Burringham	Right
Holme Dyke (Bleasby)	30	Bleasby	Left
River Idle, Nottinghamshire	13	West Stockwith	Left
Laughton Drain	10	East Ferry	Right
River Leen	36	Wilford	Left
Longton Brook	63	Trentham	Left
Lyme Brook	65	Hanford	Right
Marton Drain	18	Marton	Right
River Mease	50	Croxall	Right
Milton Brook	43	Ingleby	Right
Moreton Brook	57	Rugeley	Left
Morton Warping Drain	14	Gainsborough	Right
North Beck	20	Church Laneham	Left
Old Trent (High Marnham)	23	High Marnham	Left
Ouse Dyke	34	Stoke Bardolph	Left
Park Brook	64	Trentham	Right
Pauper's Drain	3	Amcotts	Left
Polser Brook	35	Radcliffe on Trent	Right
Pyford Brook	52	Alrewas	Right
Ramsley Brook	41	King's Newton	Right
Repton Brook	45	Repton	Right
Rising Brook	58	Rugeley	Right
Rundell Dyke	28	Averham	Left
Scotch Brook	62	Stone	Left
Sewer Drain	19	Torksey	Right
Sewer Dyke (North Clifton)	21	North Clifton	Right
Seymour Drain	17	Cottam	Left
Shropshire Brook	56	Longdon / Armitage	Left
River Soar, Leicester	39	Trentlock	Right
River Sow	59	Great Haywood	Right
River Swarbourn	53	Wychnor	Left
River Tame	51	Alrewas	Right
Tatenhill Brook	49	Branston	Left
The Beck (Carlton on Trent)	26	Carlton on Trent	Left
The Fleet	25	Girton	Right
River Torne	5	Keadby	Left
Twyford Brook	44	Twyford	Left
Warping Drain (Keadby)	4	Keadby	Left
Warping Drain (Owston Ferry)	12	Owston Ferry	Left
Wheatley Beck	15	West Burton	Left
Winterton Beck	2	Bole Ings	Right

== See also ==
- List of rivers of Great Britain
- Trent River Authority
- Trent Valley Line
- Trent Valley Way
- List of fish in the River Trent
- List of crossings of the River Trent
- Trent River (Ontario)

== Bibliography ==
- Barber, Charles (1993). The English Language: a historical introduction. Cambridge University Press. ISBN 978-0-521-78570-9.
- Cumberlidge, Jane (1998). Inland Waterways of Great Britain (7th Ed.). Imray Laurie Norie and Wilson. ISBN 978-0-85288-355-6.
- Fort, Tom (2008). Downstream. Century. ISBN 978-1-84605-169-2.
- Glover, Stephen (1829). Noble, Thomas (ed.). The History of the County of Derby. Mozley.
- Hadfield, Charles (1970). The Canals of the East Midlands. David and Charles. ISBN 978-0-7153-4871-0.
- Hadfield, Charles (1985). The Canals of the West Midlands. David and Charles. ISBN 978-0-7153-8644-6.
- Koch, J. T. (15 March 2006). Celtic Culture: A Historical Encyclopedia. ABC-CLIO. ISBN 978-1-85109-440-0.
- Large, Andrew; Petts, Geoffrey (1996). "Historical channel-floodplain dynamics along the River Trent" (PDF). Applied Geography. 16 (3): 191–209. doi:10.1016/0143-6228(96)00004-5. Archived from the original (PDF) on 5 November 2013.
- Lord, Peter (1972). Portrait of the River Trent (2nd ed.). London: Robert Hale. ISBN 978-0-7091-0210-6.
- May, Jeffrey (1977). Prehistoric Lincolnshire (History of Lincolnshire). Lincoln: History of Lincolnshire Committee. ISBN 978-0-902668-00-3.
- Nicholson (2006). Nicholson Guides Vol 6: Nottingham York and the North East. Harper Collins. ISBN 978-0-00-721114-2.
- Owen, C. C. (1978). Burton on Trent: the development of industry. Chichester: Phillimore. ISBN 978-0-85033-218-6.
- Stone, Richard (2005). The River Trent. Phillimore. ISBN 978-1-86077-356-3.
