= Yoxall =

Village in Staffordshire, England

Coordinates: 52.766°N 1.793°W

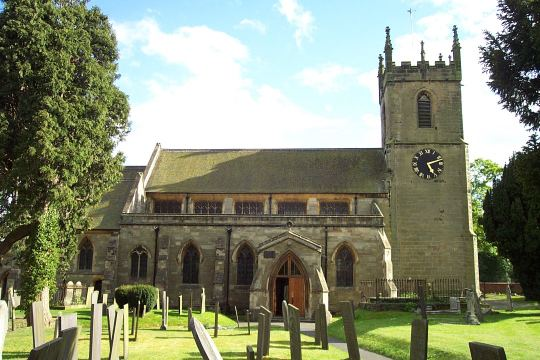
- St. Peter's Church, Yoxall

- Location within Staffordshire
- Population: 1,895 (2011)
- OS grid reference: SK142191
- Civil parish: Yoxall
- District: East Staffordshire
- Shire county: Staffordshire
- Region: West Midlands
- Country: England
- Sovereign state: United Kingdom
- Post town: Burton-on-Trent
- Postcode district: DE13
- Police: Staffordshire
- Fire: Staffordshire
- Ambulance: West Midlands
- UK Parliament: Lichfield

Yoxall is a village and civil parish in Staffordshire, England. It is on the banks of the River Swarbourn on the A515 road north of Lichfield and south west of Burton upon Trent. South of the village, Yoxall Bridge crosses the River Trent.

The name Yoxall probably comes from Anglo-Saxon geoces halh = "yoke's nook" = "secluded piece of land small enough to be ploughed by one team of oxen, or providing feed for a yoke of oxen".

== Primary school ==
Yoxall St Peter's Primary School was built in 1901. In the 1960s the hall, the offices and the junior department were added on to the existing infant department. The school has a licence from the government to keep historical documents, including punishment books, registers and other school documents from the past.

== Scouting ==
Yoxall has an active Scout group. It was formerly called Yoxall and Kings Bromley Scout group, however after a large number of children from neighbouring villages joined, it was renamed the Foresters Scout Group. There are approximately 120 children in the three sections.

== Animal rights protest ==
In October 2004, an extremist group of animal rights campaigners stole Gladys Hammond's body from the village's graveyard. A group called the Animal Rights Militia claimed responsibility for the act as an attempt to force the closure of the nearby Darley Oaks Farm, owned and run by family members, where guinea-pigs were bred for medical research. On 23 August 2005 the farm's owners announced that they would be ceasing breeding of animals in the hope that Mrs Hammond's remains would be returned. Following a police investigation, arrests were made and on 10 April 2006 three men pleaded guilty to blackmail. They were subsequently given substantial prison terms.

== Notable people ==
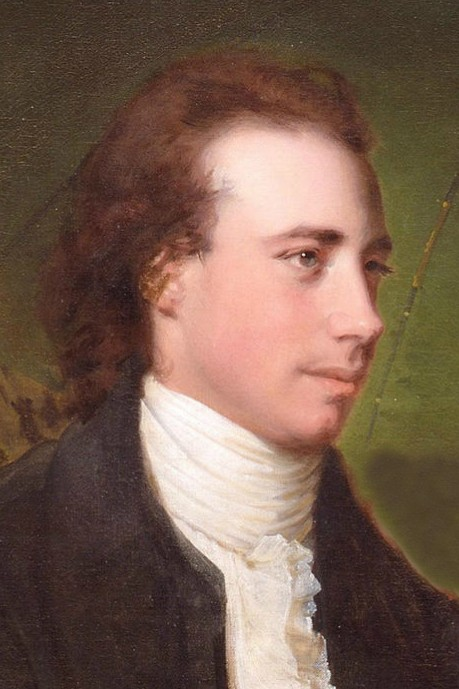
Thomas Gisborne

- William Ferrers, 1st Baron Ferrers of Groby (1272 in Yoxhall – 1325) an English peer who lived under two kings, Edward I and Edward II. His baronial caput was Groby in Leicestershire.
- Thomas Astle FRS FRSE FSA (1735 in Yoxhall – 1803) an English antiquary and palaeographer.
- Thomas Gisborne (1758 – 1846 in Yoxhall Lodge) was an English Anglican priest and poet. Friends with William Wilberforce with whom he fought for the abolition of the slave trade in England.
- George Astle (1773 in Yoxhall – 1830), a British naval Rear-Admiral of the Blue.
- James Thompson (VC) (1830 in Yoxhall – 1891) recipient of the Victoria Cross for service during the Indian Mutiny. There is a small memorial plaque in St Peter's Church, Yoxall.
