= William Allen =

William Allen may refer to:

== Politicians and government officials ==
=== United States ===
- William Allen (burgess, 1629) (c. 1600–c. 1630), British indentured servant who later served in the Virginia House of Burgesses
- William Allen (burgess, 1758–1761) (1634–1793), Virginia planter, patriot and burgess from Surry County
- William Allen (Claremont) 1768–1831), his son, Virginia planter, politician and militia officer
- William Allen (congressman) (1827–1881), United States representative from Ohio
- William Allen (governor) (1803–1879), U.S. representative, senator, and governor of Ohio
- William Allen (loyalist) (1704–1780), merchant, chief justice of Pennsylvania's provincial Supreme Court, and founder of Allentown, Pennsylvania
- William Allen (Montana politician) (1871–1953), member of the Montana House of Representatives and lieutenant governor
- William C. Allen (Wisconsin politician) (1814–1887), American businessman and politician in Wisconsin
- William F. Allen (Delaware politician) (1883–1946), American businessman and politician
- William F. Allen (New York politician) (1808–1878), American judge and politician
- William Fessenden Allen (1831–1906), American businessman and royal advisor in the Kingdom of Hawaii
- William H. Allen (politician) (c. 1851–?), member of the Mississippi House of Representatives in the 1880s
- William J. Allen (1829–1901), congressman from Illinois and federal judge
- William P. Allen (politician) (1818–1901), member of the Wisconsin State Assembly
- William Reynolds Allen (1860–1921), justice of the North Carolina Supreme Court
- William S. Allen (1857–1926), Iowa secretary of state, 1913–1918
- William V. Allen (1847–1924), U.S. senator from Nebraska
- William W. Allen (politician) (1908–1992), member of the Pennsylvania House of Representatives
- William Allen (Massachusetts judge) (1822–1891), justice of the Massachusetts Supreme Judicial Court
- William Ross Allen (1869–1942), American politician and lawyer from Virginia

=== Other ===
- William Allen (National Liberal politician) (1870–1945), British politician
- William Allen (Armagh MP) (1866–1947), Northern Irish unionist politician
- William Allen (Canadian politician) (1919–1985), from Toronto
- William Bell Allen (1812–1869), Australian politician from New South Wales
- William C. Allen (Bahamian politician) (1937–2021), Bahamanian politician and banker
- William Edward David Allen (1901–1973), British politician and historian
- William Johnston Allen (1835–1915), Australian politician from New South Wales
- William Shepherd Allen (1831–1915), English Liberal politician
- William Torrance Allen, Canadian politician from Ontario
- William John Allen, Canadian politician from Ontario

== Artists, architects, writers, and scholars ==
- William Allen (actor) (died 1647), English actor in the Caroline era
- William Allen (California architect) (1901–1986), Jewish-American architect in southern California
- William Allen (biographer) (1784–1868), American evangelical Congregationalist
- William Allen (Utah architect) (1849–1928), American architect in Utah
- William H. Allen (architect) (1858–1936), architect of New Haven, Connecticut
- William Henry Allen (artist) (1894–1988), British artist and printmaker active in New Zealand from 1925 to the 1940s
- William B. Allen (born 1944), American political scientist
- William Francis Allen (1830–1889), American classical scholar
- William Henry Allen (academician) (1808–1882), American professor
- W. H. Allen (artist) (William Herbert Allen, 1863–1943), English landscape watercolour artist
- William Rodney Allen, American author and professor of English
- William Sheridan Allen (1932–2013), American author and historian
- W. Sidney Allen (1918–2004), English linguist and philologist
- William T. Allen (1944–2019), professor of corporate law at New York University law school
- William Cicero Allen (1859–1952), American educator, historian, and author

== Military personnel ==
- William Allen (Royal Navy officer) (1792–1864), English naval officer and explorer
- William Allen (soldier) (1845–1882), American recipient of Medal of Honor
- William Allen (VC 1879) (1843–1890), English recipient of the Victoria Cross
- William Barnsley Allen (1892–1933), English recipient of the Victoria Cross
- William Henry Allen (1784–1813), American naval officer
- William Howard Allen (1790–1822), American naval officer
- William W. Allen (general) (1835–1894), Confederate general

== Scientists ==
- William Allen (English Quaker) (1770–1843), English Quaker, scientist and philanthropist
- William Douglas Allen (1914–2008), British/Australian physicist and electrical engineer
- William Henry Allen (engineer), (1844–1926), British engineer

== Sports people ==
- William Allen (sailor) (born 1947), American sailor and Olympic champion
- William Reginald Allen (English cricketer) (1893–1950), English cricketer
- William L. Allen (c. 1877–1907), American football player and coach
- William D. Allen (1886–1979), American football and basketball coach

== Clergy and philanthropists ==
- William Allen (cardinal) (1532–1594), English Roman Catholic cardinal priest
- William Allen (English Quaker) (1770–1843), English Quaker, scientist and philanthropist
- William Allen (Quaker minister) (1821–1898), American Quaker minister, also active in Canada
- William Allen (philanthropist) (1790–1856), public benefactor in South Australia
- William Allen (Congregationalist) (1847–1919), clergyman, composer and poet in Victoria, Australia

== Others ==
- William Allen (banker) (1736–1792), English banker
- William E. Allen (1880–1960), director of the U.S. Bureau of Investigation
- William G. Allen (1820–1888), American professor and abolitionist
- William McPherson Allen (1900–1985), American aircraft businessman and president of Boeing
- William (Orgain) Allen (1829–1875), American landowner and financier from Virginia
- William P. Allen (trade unionist) (1888–1958), British trade unionist
- William R. Allen (economist) (1924–2021), American economist, professor and author

== See also ==
- Bill Allen (disambiguation)
- Will Allen (disambiguation)
- Willie Allen (disambiguation)
- W H Allen (disambiguation)
- William Allen High School, Allentown, Pennsylvania
- William Allan (disambiguation)
- William Van Alen (1883–1954), American architect
