= William H. Allen =

William H. Allen may refer to:

- William H. Allen (politician) (c. 1851–?), member of the Mississippi House of Representatives
- William H. Allen (architect) (1858–1936), American architect
- W. H. Allen (artist) (1863–1943), British watercolor artist
- W. H. Allen & Co., London publishing company
- William Henry Allen (1784–1813), American naval officer
- William Henry Allen (artist) (1894–1988), British artist and printmaker
- William Howard Allen (1790–1822), American naval officer

== See also ==
- William Allen (disambiguation)
