= Douglas Pask =

British electrical engineer (1919–2008)

Commander Douglas Alexander Pask OBE
- Born: 23 March 1919; Preston, Lancashire, England
- Died: 20 May 2008 (aged 89); Gloucester, Gloucestershire, England
- Education: Imperial College London Electrical and Electronic Engineering 1941
- Spouse: Olga Denise Fletcher
- Children: Alastair Dominic Alexander Pask, Melanie Juanita Pask
- Parent(s): Vincent Alexander Pask and Ethel May Silver
- Engineering career
- Discipline: Electrical Engineer
- Projects: Hinkley Point B Nuclear Power Station Bradwell nuclear power station Berkeley nuclear power station

Douglas Pask BSc, AMIEE, AMIMechE (1919–2008) was a British electrical engineer.

== Early life ==
Pask served in the Royal Naval Volunteer Reserve during World War II. He entered as an acting temporary electrical sub-lieutenant on the 13 October 1941 and becoming a temporary electrical lieutenant on 1 June 1943. He sailed with the Swedish convoy ship Vaalaren from Liverpool to New York on the 13 April 1942 at the age of 23. On the 1 June 1951 he became lieutenant commander at HMS Flying Fox, Mardyke Wharf in Bristol later joining the London branch in 1958. He married Olga Fletcher in 1959 in the Whitehaven registration district. He was promoted to commander on 31 December 1960. Afterwards, he was involved for 38 years in the electrical industry. Much of his career was in the construction of nuclear power stations.

== Professional career ==
He served his apprenticeship with Metropolitan-Vickers and then, after war service, was a special trainee with Edmundson Electrical. From 1946 he was assistant engineer in the British European Airways South West Division construction branch and then resident engineer with the Central Electricity Generating Board at East Yelland power station. Between 1958 and 1961 he was with their Southern Project Group with particular responsibility for Bradwell nuclear power station and Berkeley nuclear power station. He became director of the Central Electricity Generating Board Northern Project group where he oversaw the construction of the first Hinton Heavy West Burton Power Station attending the opening ceremony with Arthur Hawkins and Sir Stanley Brown.

When he became director general of the South West region of Central Electricity, he oversaw the race between Hinkley Point B Nuclear Power Station and Hunterston B nuclear power station to become the first Advanced Gas-cooled Reactor to synchronise to the grid.

In 1982 he was awarded an OBE for services to the electricity industry. He was awarded the Volunteer Reserve Decoration. He was survived by his son, Dominic. His daughter Dr Melanie J. Pask PhD (Imperial College London) predeceased him two years earlier.

Business positions
Preceded by	Director General of the Central Electricity Generating Board South West Region	Succeeded by Roy Beatt
