= West Burton power stations =

Coal and gas fired power stations in Nottinghamshire, England

West Burton Power Stations
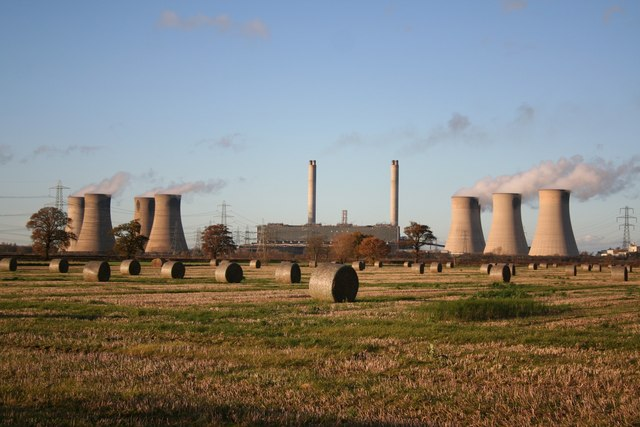
- West Burton Power Station viewed from the south in November 2006
- Country: England
- Location: West Burton, Nottinghamshire
- Coordinates: 53.361°N 0.811°W
- Status: B station operational
- Construction began: 1961 (A station); 2008 (B station)
- Commission date: 1966 (A station); 2013 (B station)
- Decommission date: 31 March 2023 (A station)
- Construction cost: £600 million (Gas)
- Owner: EDF Energy
- Operators: Central Electricity Generating Board (1966–1990); National Power (1990–1996); Eastern Group (1996–1998); TXU Energy (1998–2001); EDF Energy (2001–2021); EDF Energy (A station) (2021–present); EIG Global Energy Partners (B station) (2021–2024); TotalEnergies (B station) (2024–present)

Thermal power station
- Primary fuel: Coal
- Tertiary fuel: Gas

Power generation
- Nameplate capacity: 2,000 MW; 3,270 MW (2013–2023); 1,270 MW (2023 onwards)

External links
- Website: www.edfenergy.com
- Commons: Related media on Commons

The West Burton power stations are a pair of power stations on the River Trent, near Gainsborough, Lincolnshire, England. West Burton A was a coal-fired power station, one of the Hinton Heavies which was commissioned in 1966 and operated until 2023. West Burton B on the other hand, is a combined cycle gas turbine power station, commissioned in 2013. West Burton A is owned by EDF Energy, while West Burton B is owned and operated by TotalEnergies.

The station has been accredited as an Investor in People since 1995, and certified to ISO 14001 for its environmental management system since 1996; the power station won a RoSPA President's Award in 2006, 2007 and 2008. The site is the farthest north of what was a series of power stations in the Trent valley, being 5.6 kilometres (3.5 mi) downstream of the now-closed Cottam power stations. As of September 2022, it was one of only three coal-fired power stations left in the UK and was required to close before 2024, with generation on two units initially planned to cease on 30 September 2022.

Due to the volatile energy market associated with the 2022 Russian invasion of Ukraine, the United Kingdom Government agreed with plant owners EDF Energy that the remaining two generating units would be available for use for 6 months beyond the 30 September 2022 closure date, in order to provide supplies over the winter period. The plant ended generation on 31 March 2023.

The site of West Burton A is the planned location for the first nuclear fusion power plant to be built under the Spherical Tokamak for Energy Production (STEP) programme.

== West Burton A history ==
=== Construction ===
The station is built on the site of the deserted medieval village of West Burton. Construction began in 1961 by the Northern Project Group a department within the CEGB the construction was overseen by resident engineer Douglas Derbyshire who had recently completed the build of the nearby High Marnham Power Station. In a bid to combine efforts at the design and construction stages the Boiler and Turbo-generator plant were replicated at Fiddlers Ferry power station located in Cuerdley, Cheshire, in North West England.

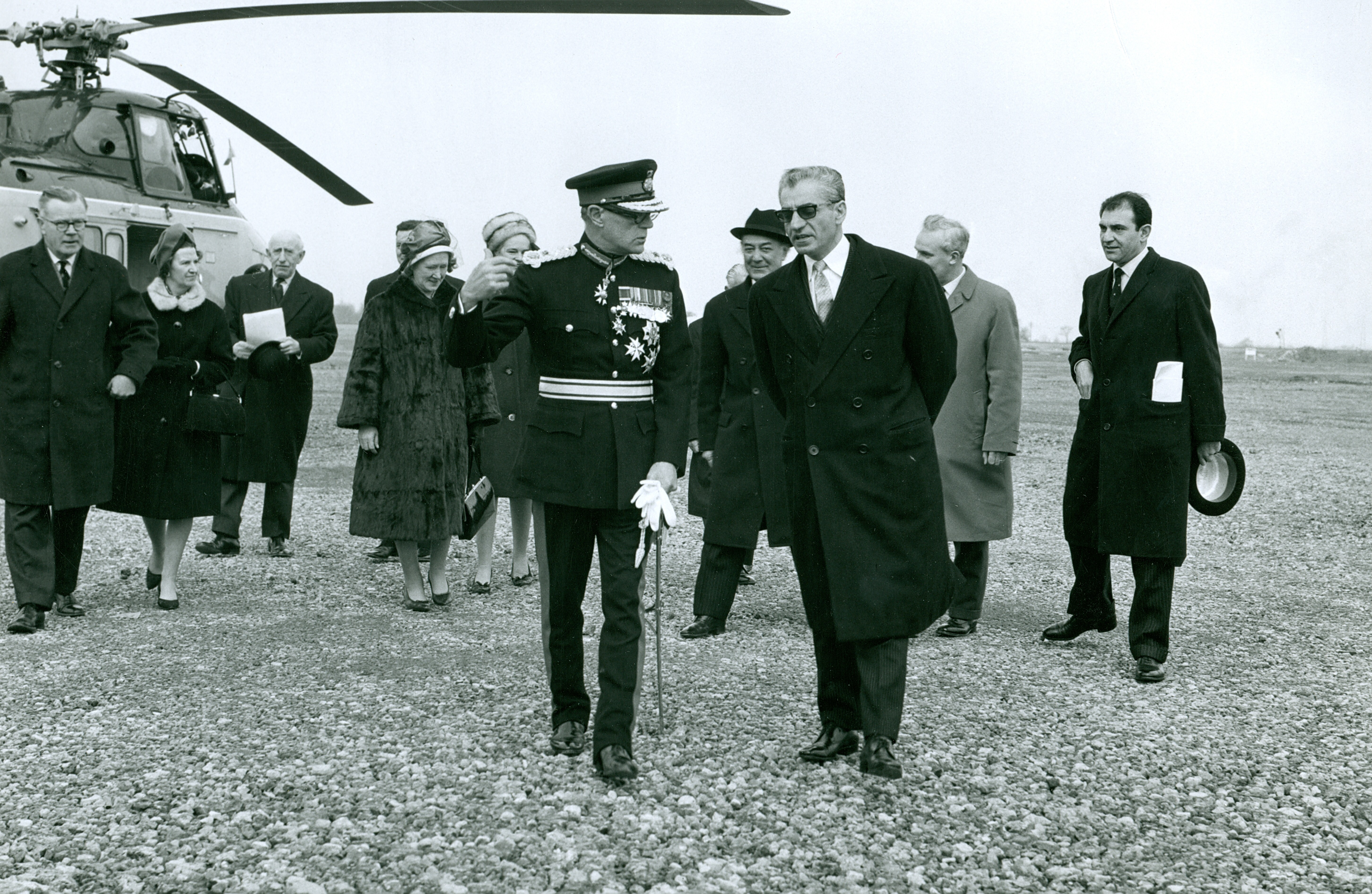
The Shah of Iran visits West Burton Power Station in a Westland Whirlwind of The Queen's Flight escorted by the Lord Lieutenant of Nottinghamshire in 1965

The consulting engineers for the project were Merz & McLellan and the main contractor on site was Alfred McAlpine with steelwork designed by the Cleveland Bridge & Engineering Company.

The station was the first 2,000 MW power station to be constructed in the United Kingdom and was visited by the then chairman of the CEGB Christopher Hinton on 27 November 1964 the instigator of the new 500 MW units. It subsequently attracted visitors from around the world including Mohammad Reza Pahlavi the Shah of Iran who was escorted around the site by Robert Laycock the Lord Lieutenant of Nottinghamshire on 6 March 1965.

West Burton number one unit, commissioned in September 1966, was the second 500 MW generating unit to be ordered and go into full commercial operation. A further three units were commissioned at the site in 1967. The station was officially opened on 25 April 1969 by the Minister of Power Roy Mason, Sir Stanley Brown the then Chairman of the CEGB, Arthur Hawkins Director of the Midlands Region and Douglas Pask director of the Northern Project Group. It was a lavish ceremony with a large marquee and band present.

=== Architecture ===
The principal architects for the buildings were Rex Savidge and John Gelsthorpe of Architects' Design Group (ADG) from Baker Street, Nottingham. Heliodon modelling was used to determine the visual and psychological impact of the structures to be used on site due to their scale. This created a Zone of Visual Influence (ZVI) a system pioneered by the CEGB for the creation of future 2,000 MW power stations in the 1960s. The tower layouts exploit line and lozenge formations. The opposite pairs of the lozenge group were coloured light and dark to avoid tendency of shapes to coalesce when viewed at a moderate distance. The offset tower of the line group has a light yellow colour with intense hue which acts as a nodal point. This was decided via a technical committee, the architects and William Holford in 1962. However, 10 years after construction the towers were indistinguishable from one another as the yellow tint was much faded. The main building colours are limited to black, white and yellow. The ancillary buildings are grouped around two courts through which the approach road passes. The Executive partner for (ADG) was Rex Savidge and Architect in charge was John Gelsthorpe assisted by Norman Simpson. West Burton was granted an award by the Civic Trust for its "outstanding contribution to the surrounding scene". The Civic Trust, announcing the 82 awards it made in 1968 from more than 1,400 entries from 94 counties in the United Kingdom described West Burton as "an immense engineering work of great style which, far from detracting from the visual scene, acts as a magnet to the eye from many parts of the Trent Valley".

=== Ownership ===
The plant was originally operated by the CEGB and then run by National Power after privatisation, until April 1996 when it was bought by the Eastern Group which became TXU Europe. In November 2001 when the price of electricity was low, TXU Europe sold the station to London Electricity Group for £366 million. EDF Energy operated the West Burton power stations from 2001, however on 9 April 2021 the company announced the sale of the 1,332 MW Combined Cycle Gas Turbine power station and 49 MW battery at West Burton B to EIG Global Energy Partners. The sale process was completed on 31 August 2021.

In 1977 a British Rail Class 56 locomotive was officially named in front of the coal plant control block as 'West Burton Power Station' number 56009 later re-numbered to 56201.

Prior to privatisation West Burton was the last CEGB power station to be awarded the Christopher Hinton trophy in recognition of good housekeeping. The station had a Discovery Centre to educate local school children and also has the oldest mound of FGD gypsum in the UK, part of an experiment set up by CEGB scientists in 1988. In the summer of 1998 Station Manager Derrek Wells was awarded the OBE for his services to the power industry.

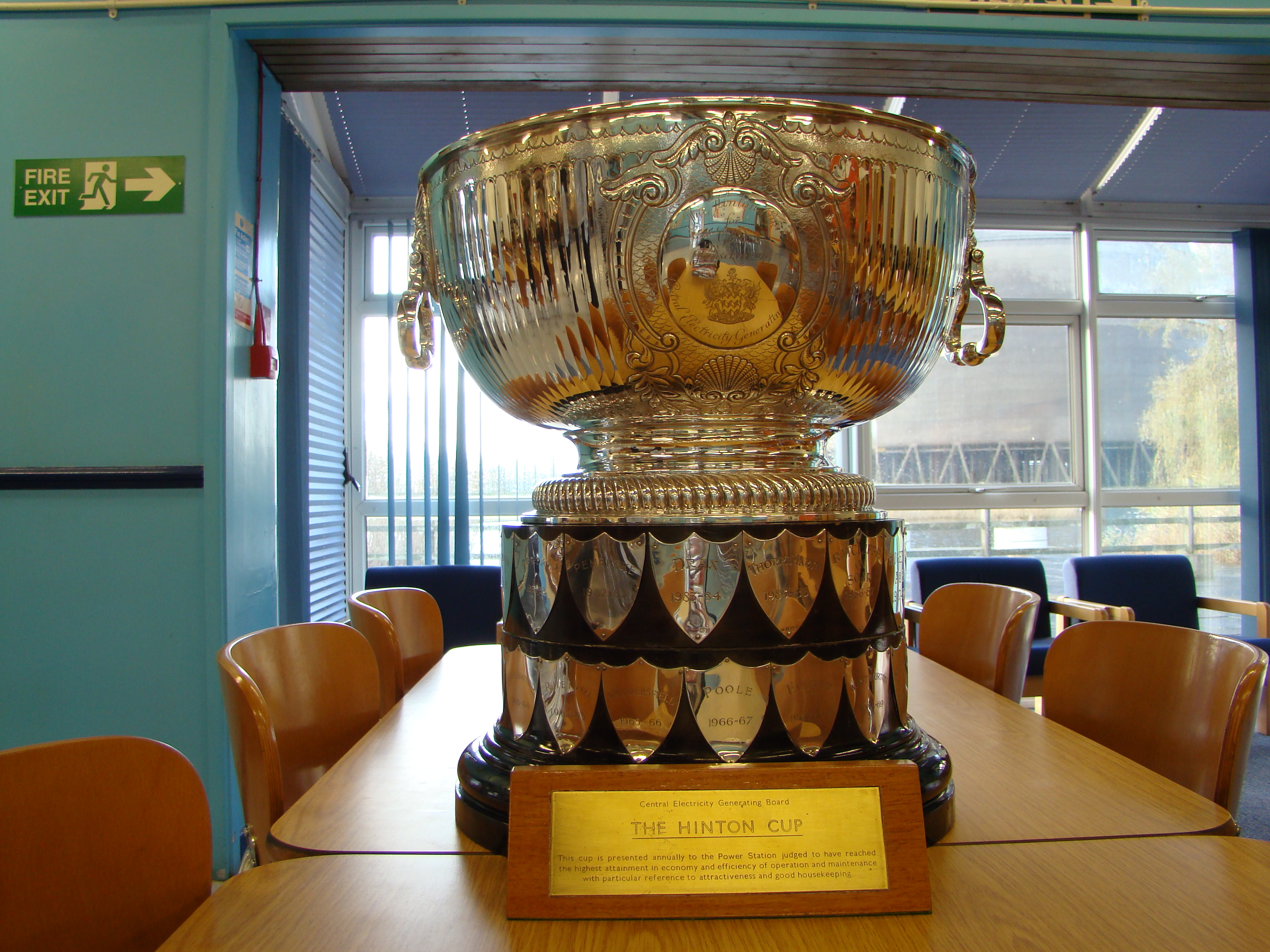
Hinton Cup

=== Environment ===
West Burton was opted in to the UK Transitional National Plan, placing limits on its sulphur dioxide, nitrous oxides and particulates emissions to a period up to the end of 2020: part of the Industrial Emissions Directive 2010/75/EU which superseded the Large Combustion Plant Directive 2001/80/EC. Under the EU regulations West Burton was classed as two power plants due to the fact of having two chimneys.

=== Unbuilt West Burton 'B' (Coal) ===
In 1988 the then chairman of the CEGB Walter Marshall, Baron Marshall of Goring announced a 2 x 900 MW coal-fired power station fitted with flue-gas desulphurisation (FGD) to be known as 'West Burton B' would be built on the site. The plan was abandoned just before privatisation.

=== Closure and future ===
In March 2021, EDF confirmed that West Burton A would cease generation on 30 September 2022. However, in June 2022, EDF agreed to defer closure of two units at West Burton A power station by a further six months with the closure date revised to 31 March 2023. This was in response to the Government request to keep the units available over the winter of 2022–23. The station closed as planned on 31 March 2023. Decommissioning of the station took place throughout the latter months of 2023, and demolition began in January 2024 with a planned end date of 2028. There has been protest to the demolition of the station from campaign group The Twentieth Century Society, arguing significant pieces of Britain's industrial heritage such as West Burton A should be preserved. The Society added the building to its Risk List of architecture at risk of being lost in 2023.

After it was first listed as a candidate in June 2021, on 3 October 2022 the site was announced as the planned location for the first nuclear fusion power plant to be built under the Spherical Tokamak for Energy Production (STEP) programme.

== West Burton B history ==
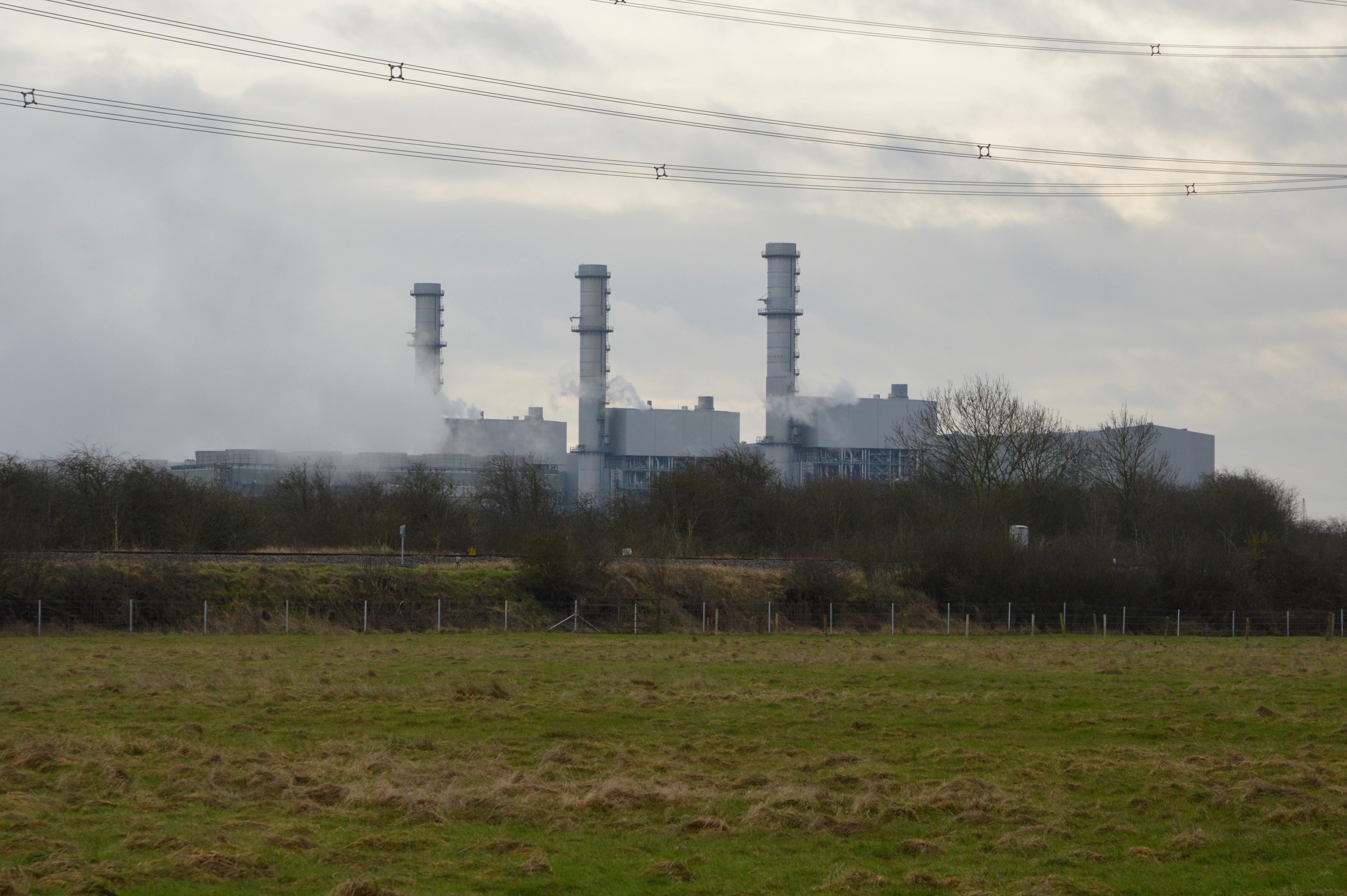
West Burton B viewed from Bole in 2024

A £600 million 1,270 MWe CCGT power station, which runs on natural gas, was built next to the coal-fired station. Construction by the Kier Group started in January 2008. It was built on land originally allocated for a proposed 1,800 MW West Burton 'B' coal power station that was to have been built in the 1980s. Privatisation of the electricity industry in 1990 cancelled this scheme. The power station was commissioned in 2013, and supplies electricity to around 1.5 million homes. A new 19 km (12 mi) gas pipeline was built to link to the National Transmission System at Grayingham in Lincolnshire. Around 1,000 people were involved in the construction. The plant consists of three 430 MW gas turbines each with a heat recovery steam generator.

Activists from the No Dash For Gas group protesting against the building of the gas plant pleaded guilty to charges of aggravated trespass in February 2013. EDF discontinued a civil lawsuit against them in March 2013.

== West Burton C (planned) ==
West Burton C is a planned 299 MW OCGT peaking plant, to be located on the West Burton site. It was granted planning consent in October 2020. The land and rights to build the station were retained by EDF Energy upon the sale of West Burton B to EIG in 2021. At the time, it was reported EDF Energy had 'no immediate plans' to build the station.

== West Burton A specification ==
West Burton A provided electricity for around two million people, and is situated on a 170-hectare (410-acre) site. Coal for the power station, like Cottam, came from the Welbeck colliery at Meden Vale until it closed in May 2010. The station's other main supplier of coal, Thoresby Colliery, closed in 2015. The station connected to the National Grid, like most similar sized coal power stations, via a transformer and substation at 400 kV. The chimneys of West Burton Power Station are 200 metres (660 ft) tall.

=== Boiler ===
The four boilers have single divided furnaces and assisted circulation. Each has a maximum continuous rating of 1,565 tonnes per hour (3,450,000 lb/h) and a design efficiency of 90.75%. Built by International Combustion, the design is similar in many respects to that of the now redundant 550 MW ICL boiler at Thorpe Marsh which had two furnaces with centre division walls. There are six stages of superheat and three stages of reheat in each boiler, with superheat and reheat stages mixed in position. As a result of operating experience on boilers of this size at Thorpe Marsh it was found that higher superheat temperatures and larger pressure drops than the design figures occurred in the boiler. New materials had to be employed for the superheat sections and the tube paths redesigned as a result.

The boilers are 53.65 m (176.0 ft) high and the main suspension girders span 27.43 m (90.0 ft). The total downward thermal expansion is about 228 to 305 mm (9.0 to 12.0 in). The superheater output is 569 °C at 170 bar (2,400 psi). The reheater has inlet and outlet temperatures of 364 and 569 °C with an inlet pressure of 40.8 bar (592 psi) and steam flow of 1,243 tonnes per hour (2,740,000 lb/h). The single steam drum weighs 160 tonnes.

The furnace is tangentially fired with eight burner boxes, each with six burners, together with oil burners in each box for lighting up. Steam temperature control is by electrically operated tilting burners and by electro-hydraulically operated spray desuperheaters, giving a control range of 70 to 100% of the maximum continuous rating. There are four desuperheaters for each of the superheater and reheater circuits. The economisers have a heating surface of 44,970 m^{2} (484,100 ft^{2}).

There are two forced and two induced draught Davidson fans per boiler. The f.d. fans are driven by constant speed 1,300 hp motors at 596 rpm and are rated at 11,380 m^{3}/min (402,000 (cu ft)/min).

A saving in the overall size of the boiler house building, which measures 259.69 m (852.0 ft) long, 44.2 m (145 ft) wide and 60.05 m (197.0 ft) high, was achieved by arranging the pulverised fuel mills in two rows between adjacent boilers instead of in a line along the length of the boiler house as usual. This meant that coal conveyors at right angles to the trunk conveyor had to be installed for each line of mills, but the cost of these was more than offset by the saving in capital on the building. There are six roller type mills per boiler, each powered by a direct coupled 635 hp motor at 985 rpm. The coal is fed to the mills by Lopulco chain feeders with induction regulator speed controllers.

Separated over-fire air (SOFA) burners were installed on all four of the station's units in 2007 to meet European Union nitrogen oxide emission legislation. The burners were installed by GE Energy.

=== Turbine ===
The 500 MW single shaft machines manufactured by English Electric, are arranged lengthwise along the turbine hall, which is 259 m (850 ft) long by 39.6 m (130 ft) wide by 26 m (85 ft) high. The overall length of each machine is 49.5 m (162 ft). The generators are rated at 500 MW, 22 kV at 0.85 power factor. Steam conditions at the H.P. turbine stop valve are 158.6 bar (2,300 psi) at 566 °C with a single reheat stage to the I.P. cylinder of 38.96 bar (565 psi) at 566 °C. The turbine has a design steam consumption of 2.9 kg/kWh (6.3932 lb/kWh), including reheating, feed heating, and boiler feed pump drive and an overall heat input of 2.2 kWh/kWh (7,543 Btu/kWh), an efficiency of about 45.5%.

A novel mounting arrangement was adopted for the turbo-generators. The L.P. cylinders are supported on two steel beams about 22.1 metres (72.5 ft) long, which bridge between the concrete blocks at the H.P. steam and generator ends of the sets. The fabricated condenser structure was welded directly to the underside of the L.P. frame using a pre-heated welding technique. This provides a compact arrangement of the condenser and the main set and is a major factor in the reduction of size related to the output of the machines, which is a striking feature of the turbine hall. The L.P. frame is supported at its corners, each of the supports taking about 203.2 tonnes (200 tons) in weight. The overall weight of the frame and condenser structure is some 2,235 tonnes of which 1,422 tonnes is supported on the bottom of the condenser by the mounting springs.

The condensers were fabricated on site by English Electric from sub assemblies and welded to the bridge beams supporting the L.P. cylinder. There are over 40,000 914.4 cm (30 ft) long, 25.4 mm (1 in) diameter aluminium/brass tubes in each condenser, giving an effective surface area of 27,870 m^{2} (300,000 ft^{2}), the equivalent of 3.9 football pitches. Operation is at 4.4 kPa (1.3 inHg) with 1,023 m^{3}/min (1,020,000 L (225,000 imp gal) of cooling water at 15.5 °C). Steam is passed to the condenser at over 963.9 tonnes/hour (2,125,000 lb/h). Since contamination of the condensate by the cooling water must be avoided, a double tube plate construction has been adopted in which the condenser tubes are expanded into an extra tubeplate in addition to the one forming the side of the water box. The narrow space between the plates is filled with demineralised water, supplied from a header tank from 48.77 m (160 ft). This provides a pressure considerably higher than the 138 kPaG (20 PSIG) developed in the cooling water system, so that any leaks on the tube end plates will be supplied from the header tank.

The bridge condenser Is a single surface type unit, receiving and condensing the steam discharged from the six exhausts of the three double flow LP cylinders, combined with an upper frame supporting and containing the cylinders themselves. The integrated structure, weighing about 2,280 tonnes in its working condition, spans the two concrete foundation blocks supporting the HP and IP cylinder and the generator, hence the name bridge condenser. About two-thirds of the weight is transferred to the basement floor through a mattress of springs. The circulating water used as a cooling medium passes through 40,740 tubes arranged in six groups, each of two tube bundles, with each group lying directly below a turbine exhaust.

The single shaft five cylinder impulse-reaction turbine has a double flow arrangement for the I.P. cylinders as well as for the L.P. cylinders. There are double casings on H.P., I.P., and L.P. cylinders, and the last stages of the L.P. are fitted with 914.4 mm (36 in) blades.

Stop valves and governor valves are situated at the inlet to the H.P. strainers and I.P. turbine. There are four 228.6 mm (9 in) bore main steam pipes, and four 431.8 mm (17 in) bore pipes on both the hot and cold reheat circuits to the turbine. In view of the size and increased volume of pipework compared to earlier designs, special attention was paid to mounting the valve chests as close to the machine as possible to reduce the stored energy effect of overspeed. For the H.P. valves this is done without actually mounting the valves on the cylinder, thus avoiding complication of the H.P. casing.

Because the coupled shafts 'hang' in a curve, which may be 12.7 mm (1/2 in) lower at the centre than at the ends, the complete generator must be adjusted with its outer end slightly higher than the end adjacent to the turbine, so that the turbine and generator coupling faces are parallel, and peripherally true before they are bolted together. This adjustment is achieved to an accuracy at the coupling face of 12.7 μm (0.00050 in).

=== Generator ===
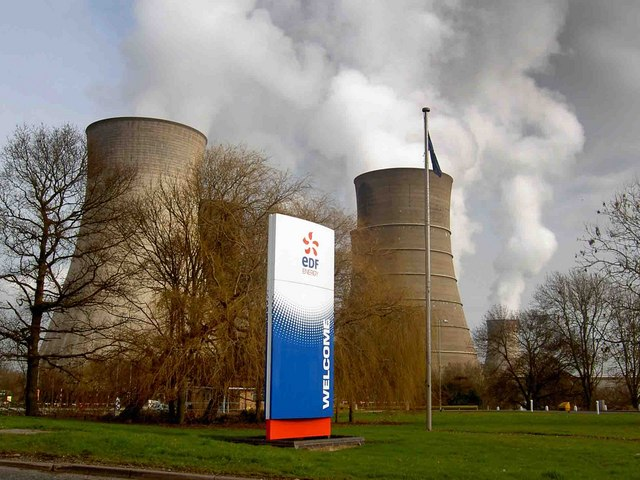
EDF branding in 2009

Each of the four generators is designed for an output of 500 MW at 0.85 power factor with a terminal voltage of 22 kV. Hydrogen at a pressure of 414 kPaG (60 PSIG), is employed for cooling the stator core and rotor conductors, the gas being in direct contact with the rotor conductors, and water is used for cooling the stator conductors. Hydrogen coolers are arranged longitudinally in the upper part of the stator frame and the hydrogen is circulated by an axial flow blower mounted on the turbine end of the rotor shaft. The stator is of two-part construction, the core and windings being assembled in a skeleton inner frame threaded into the outer stator frame at site. The weight of the heaviest part, the inner stator, is 194 tonnes.

The generator stator winding is water cooled at 2.155 m^{3}/min (474 imp gal/min) and the stator core and rotor winding are cooled by hydrogen at 414 kPaG (60 PSIG) circulated by a blower on the shaft. To reduce the transport weight, each stator consists of an outer gas tight enclosure, which carries the hydrogen coolers and the end brackets which support the rotor bearings, and an inner stator comprising the magnetic core and windings.

The stator core is built with laminations of cold rolled grain-oriented sheet steel 0.33 millimetres (0.013 in) thick, insulated from each other with insuline. The number of segments per circle is arranged so that the maximum practical percentage of core flux is in the direction of the oriented grain. The rings of laminations are built into a skeleton frame which is flexibly supported inside the main stator frame to prevent double-frequency vibrations being transmitted to the foundations. Axial gas passages are provided within the core by holes punched in the laminations, which line up throughout its length. The ends of the core are divided axially by spacers into a number of radial ducts. These ducts form the gas inlet and outlet passages for the axial gas passages. Separate radial ducts feed the extreme ends of the core with cold gas to cater for the increased heating experienced at the core ends during leading power factor operation. Each coil side of the stator winding consists of rectangular copper tubes, each tube being insulated with resin-impregnated glass braid, and the tubes are transposed within the coil length by the Roebel method to minimise stray copper losses. Inlet and outlet manifolds are arranged at opposite ends of the windings and all coil sides are fed in parallel from these. The water connections between the manifolds and coil sides are made with flexible hoses of insulating material. The electrical connections between coil sides consist of flexible copper straps, bolted and sweated to contact blocks which are brazed to the conductor tubes near to the end of each coil side. The rings used to connect up the phase groups to the terminals are also water cooled, the flow through these being in parallel with the flow through the coil sides.

Direct hydrogen cooling is employed in the stator terminals. The rotor forging is of nickel chromium molybdenum vanadium steel having a minimum yield point of 51,500 t/m^{2} (33.2 t/in^{2}). The shaft end which connects to the turbine is deferentially tempered to give additional strength to withstand the severe forces which could be applied under fault conditions on the generator. The first three critical speeds are arranged to be below the running speed. The hydrogen-cooled rotor conductors are formed from silver-bearing hard drawn copper tube. Two tubes in parallel form one conductor and there are six conductors per slot except for the slots adjacent to the pole centres, which contain five. The generator is ventilated by cold gas fed to a number of radial ducts at the slipring end of the core, which communicate with the axial vent holes in the core and stator teeth. After passing through the axial holes the gas is discharged into the 'air' gap through further radial ducts at the turbine end of the core. The gas discharged from the core passes along the 'air' gap, together with the hot gas discharged from the outlet holes in the rotor body, to the region between the end windings and a baffle at the slipring end, and thence through one half of each axial cooler to the blower intake. After leaving the blower, the gas is passed through the other halves of the coolers and is delivered to the various inlet regions of the stator core and rotor. Gas is fed to the turbine end of the rotor through axial holes machined in the hub of the blower rotor from an annulus formed between the end bracket and the blower outlet diffuser. Large diameter tubes passing longitudinally through the stator frame connect this annulus to the extreme end section at the slipring end, from which the slipring end of the rotor is fed. The three-stage axial blower mounted on the generator shaft comprises a shaft-mounted sleeve upon which is mounted the bladed rotor disc, a bladed stator casing, a diffuser and an inlet fairing.

The stator casing and diffuser are rigidly supported from the turbine end bearing bracket. Low conductivity demineralised water is circulated through the stator windings by a pump and passes through coolers and a filter before entering the inlet manifold of the winding. After passing through the winding the water returns to the pump through a degassing tank. This is basically a sudden enlargement in the pipe, which causes the water velocity to decrease and so enables any bubbles of gas to be collected in a small chamber fitted with a float-operated alarm switch. A header tank, which contains enough water for a complete refill of the system, is connected into the inlet pipe to the winding. A small demineralising plant is provided to treat the water, should the conductivity of the make-up water supply be too high.

The main exciter is a 3,000 rpm 3-phase machine directly coupled to the main generator shaft. Cooling is effected by a closed air ventilation circuit with pannier mounted coolers supplied with cooling water from the condensate system. The exciter output is rectified by a 3-phase bridge-connected group of silicon diodes which are natural air cooled and accommodated in a bank of nine cubicles located on a platform cantilevered from the side of the foundation block. Mounted adjacent to the rectifiers is the main field suppression circuit-breaker which incorporates a discharge resistance and auxiliary switch to close the discharge circuit. A permanent magnet high frequency generator, directly coupled to the exciter shaft, acts as a pilot exciter and supplies the exciter field via a power stage magnetic amplifier which may be regulated either by manual control or by the automatic voltage regulator. The AVR is a continuously acting regulator including such features as VAR limiting, automatic follow-up of manual control, and protection against over fluxing or over exciting of the main generator.

=== Feed system ===
There are three stages of H.P. feed heating with six heater shells arranged in parallel pairs, a de-aerator and three low pressure heaters. Steam is bled from the main turbine H.P. exhaust to drive the main boiler feed pump turbine, which exhausts to the feed heating system to improve the overall cycle efficiency.

The main feed pump turbine is a 15,150 hp single-cylinder impulse machine with steam conditions, at the h.p. exhaust, of 610 psia (42.06 bar) at 366 °C. The rotor has eleven stages and the steam is exhausted to the de-aerator at 358.5 barA (52 PSIA) at 144 °C. The pump is a six-stage centrifugal unit with a capacity of 1588 tonnes/hour (3,500,000 lb/h). Two 50 per cent duty start-up and standby feed pumps, electrically driven, are also provided.

=== Cooling water system ===
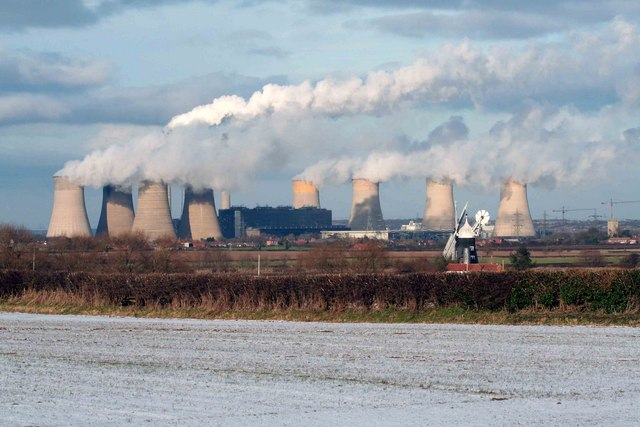
The cooling towers in 2009

The eight cooling towers, built by Davenport Engineering Ltd. of Bradford, have a capacity of 30,690,000 L/h (6,750,000 imp gal/h) and a normal cooling range of 8.5 °C. The towers are 106.7 m (350 ft) high with internal diameters at sill level of 86.56 m (284.0 ft) and at the top 50 and 46.33 m (164.0 and 152.0 ft) at the throat. Cooling tower C1 was fitted with reinforced concrete tension rings in 2000 to provide additional stability to the structural shell.

Cooling water is circulated by Allen Gwynnes horizontal centrifugal bottom suction cooling water pumps, with four in each of the two pump houses. Each pump has a capacity of 545,500 L/min (120,000 imp gal/min) with a net generated head of 23.16 m (76.0 ft). Make-up water from the river Trent is pumped by four 45,460 L/m (10,000 imp gal/min) vertical centrifugal pumps).

=== Coal store ===
Coal is supplied via north- and south-facing junctions off the adjacent Manchester and Cleethorpes railway line. Coal arriving at the station is discharged from the permanently coupled 29-tonne capacity hopper wagons, the bottoms of which are opened by automatic lineside gear while the train moves through at 0.8 km/h. The four W & T Avery Ltd. weighbridges, two on each of the two rail tracks using electronic weighing heads, record the weight of the coal wagons loaded and empty and summate the total quantity of coal delivered. The coal store on the site has a maximum capacity of 1,814 kilotonnes at 9.14 m (30 ft) deep, it is used to deposit all surplus coal and to build up stocks. There are also two fly ash siding (E & F) and two oil sidings (K & L).

West Burton Power Station was used as a testing ground for the merry-go-round train system in 1965 which would be introduced at all 500 MW and above power stations. During the stations' early life in the 1970s and under the merry-go-round train agreement with British Rail and the National Coal Board, no deliveries were made at the weekends. The coal store has capacity for over three months' operation of the station. When discharged from the railway wagons, the coal drops into the hoppers immediately under the track, where it is scooped out evenly along the length of the hoppers by remotely operated paddle feeder machines. These deposit the coal on two twin deep-trough belt conveyors 1,371.6 mm (54 in) wide, each with a capacity of 1,361 tonnes/hour at 137.16 m/min (450 ft/min). The belt conveyors feed coal via the screening and crushing plant, where it is also passed through magnetic separators, to the transfer tower.

From this tower the coal can be passed to stock via a boom stacker or direct to the boiler house. There are seven belt weighers installed in the conveyor system, to enable checks to be made on the coal quantities passed to stock, re-claimed from stock and finally passed to the boiler house bunkers. The four 2,722-tonne capacity boiler bunkers will hold enough coal for overnight operation without drawing from the coal store. The normal maximum consumption of each boiler is approximately 181.4 tonnes/hour.

=== Gas turbine ===
Four 17.5 MW gas turbine driven alternators were installed at the station. They supply power to the auxiliaries in the event of the grid system frequency varying outside suitable limits for the plant. A low frequency relay, which can be pre-set between 49 and 50 cycles per second, initiates the starting operation on the gas turbines; normally the setting is 49.5 cycles per second. The load is automatically taken over by the gas turbines and the auxiliary plant is isolated from the grid supply, provided the system frequency has by then fallen to approximately 48 cycles per second. The gas turbine generators can also be used for augmenting the station output at peak load via the unit transformers.

If the station becomes completely isolated from the grid system, the gas turbines are used to restart any main units that are shut down. This process is known as a black start and is tested annually. Each gas turbine unit consists of an English Electric type EA 3,000 r.p.m. expansion turbine employing two Rolls-Royce Avon type RA29 Stage 6A (1533–51) engines as gas generators, and is directly coupled to the alternator. The alternators, made by English Electric are rated at 11 kV, 21.9 MVA, 0.8 lagging power factor and have a frequency range of 40 to 51 cycles per second. Two of the four gas turbines were later decommissioned during the 1990s.

=== 400 kV Supergrid Substation ===
The 400 kV substation interconnects four generator circuits, six feeders, two inter-bus transformers and includes two bus coupler switches and one main busbar section. The circuits are back to back and are arranged with the generator and interbus transformer connections on the power station side and the line entries on the opposite side of the substation. The current line entries are Bicker Fen-Walpole, Bicker Fen-Spalding North, Keadby 2, High Marnham, Cottam, and Keadby 1.

In January 1962, there were the first plans for one of the first 400 kV lines from the proposed power station, to Waltham Cross in north-east London. The line would cross the River Trent at Marton, to pass five miles west of Lincoln, near Doddington and Navenby, to pass north of Sleaford, near Ruskington and Heckington, and further via Holbeach. Each line could carry 3,000 MW of power, or 4 million horse power. The pylons would be 48 metres (158 ft) high, and 370 metres (1,200 ft) apart. The pylon line would cost £29,000 a kilometre. If underground, it would cost £708,000 per kilometre, and need a trench 10 metres (34 ft) wide. There would be a substation at Burwell, Cambridgeshire. A possible substation had been planned for Great Wilbraham in Cambridgeshire. BICC received an order for the line in May 1962, with another 400 kV line from Dungeness to Lydd and Bolnex. The line of 51-metre (168 ft) pylons had reached Aubourn by July 1963. The line would first operate at 275 kV, now costing £33,500 per kilometre in 1963. Foundations were being built in the Holbeach area in August 1963. By February 1964 the pylons had reached Ruskington. By July 1964, the pylons were being built near Bicker and Gosberton. By September 1964 the pylon construction had reached Burwell and Bottisham. The Burwell substation would be built by 1966. Along the route, no-one had wanted the pylons, and Kesteven and councils in Cambridgeshire had put up an immense amount of opposition. The 101 kilometres (63 mi) to Walpole, Norfolk was commissioned in February 1965, with 289 steel towers, weighing 7,900 tonnes in total. It was the longest 400 kV line in the UK. It was switched on on 22 December 1964. By early 1967 the line was reaching Waltham Cross, via Stocking Pelham in Hertfordshire.

==== Civil works ====
The design of the prototype indoor 400 kV switch house was arrived at by close liaison between electrical and civil engineers before full details of plant and equipment were known. The structural frames are at 21.3 m (70 ft) centres, each frame consisting of five continuous portals, each 23.3 metres (76 ft) wide with a 7.9 m (26 ft) cantilever at each end. The inner portals take the busbars and the two outer portals the breakers. The cantilever gives space for the through bushings and isolators.

There are nine 21.3 m (70 ft) structural bays in the length of the Switch House, making the building 195 m × 132.5 m (640 ft × 435 ft). The site area is approximately 5.26 hectares (13.0 acres), of which the switch house takes up 2.42 hectares (6.0 acres). The total weight of the steelwork is about 2,540 tonnes.

==== Roof load ====
The main and longitudinal girders have been designed as welded lattice steel members of sufficient depth to incorporate the access walkways. In addition to transferring the roof load to the columns these girders also have the 'V' strain insulators attached to them. The side framing of the building as well as carrying the wall cladding also supports the wall bushings and provides anchorage for the strainer connections between the turbine house and the switch house. The switch house was designed so as to fit in the architectural treatment of the Power Station as a whole. The plastic-coated aluminium cladding is therefore coloured black on the north and south faces of the building and gold on the east and west. The roof line of the switch house is designed to blend with the 'saw tooth' effect on the turbine house roof. Construction work began in the severely cold winter of 1962/63. The cold weather was turned to advantage as the clay subsoil which is generally unmanageable when wet was frozen solid. Excavation went on uninterrupted on drainage branches during this period. The wet mix base was next introduced over all the site. The object of the wet mix was to apply a firm layer for the construction to be carried on even when subsoil clay was wet. Construction traffic also tended to compact the wet mix therefore improving it as a base for the final topcoat of bitumen macadam.

Steel erection began in June 1963. Erection was carried out by means of two derricks which ran along tracks extending over the length of the switch house. As soon as the steelwork contractor had moved out of the first bays, the civil contractor began work on erecting precast concrete structures, forming trenches and tidying up the surfacing. Access within the switch house was made easier by a decision to lay 228-millimetre-diameter (9 in) ducts to take many of the cables beneath the surface, thus eliminating numerous trenches.

The precast concrete structures proved to be comparatively easy to erect to very close tolerances. On the isolator structures the various concrete members are bolted together using high tensile steel bolts to a pre-determined torque. All in situ concrete is eliminated from these structures. The circuit breaker structures were cast in situ. The contract was started on 21 January 1963 and was substantially completed by 30 November 1964. Access was given to the electrical contractors in April 1964.

=== 132 kV Substation ===
In addition to interconnecting the supergrid system, the West Burton 400 kV substation also feeds into the local 132 kV network. This connection is made via two 240 MVA, 400/132 kV auto-transformers manufactured by Associated Electrical Industries. The windings consists of a tertiary winding, a common, a tapping and a series winding. They are arranged so that the helical single layer tertiary winding is nearest the core, the continuous disc common winding next, followed by the interleaved full-length helical type tapping winding and the multi-layer type series winding and line shield. A continuously transposed conductor was used to minimise eddy current losses and reduce the space requirement of the windings.

High speed resistor tap changers are provided on the 132 kV side of each transformer, giving a tapping range of plus 15% to minus 5%. The tapping winding has 7 taps which in conjunction with a buck/boost switch provide fourteen steps. The fixed contacts of each of the two rotary tap selector units associated with each phase are connected to one half of the tappings from the windings while the moving contacts are connected to the diverter switches. The diverter switch assembly, together with the transition resistors and operating mechanism is mounted on top of the 132 kV bushing which forms an integral part of the tap changer.

Erection of the transformer was carried out inside a translucent plastic dome, inflated by a small blower. This allowed the work to continue regardless of the weather and thus reduced the time normally taken for erecting large transformers in the open. By working day and night within the plastic dome the time for erection on site was reduced from an estimated 8 weeks to 3 weeks. Completely assembled, each transformer is 14.94 m (49.0 ft) long, 10.06 m (33.0 ft) wide, and weighs 325.1 tonnes made up of 154.4 tonnes of steel, 30.48 tonnes of copper, and 19.3 tonnes of insulation and 98,420 litres (26,000 imp gal) of oil. The current line entries for the 132 kV switch house are North Greetwell – Lincoln 1, Retford – Worksop – Checkerhouse 2, North Greetwell – Lincoln 2 and Retford – Worksop – Checkerhouse 1

=== Control system ===
In 1996 the first unit was equipped with the Advanced Plant Management System (APMS), a system developed by RWE npower and Thales, and implemented by Capula. All the remainder units followed in later years. The APMS database contains some 16,000 points. Operations staff interact with the system through four main workstation screens, supplemented by a further six overview screens.

=== Flue gas desulphurisation ===
In June 2000, work began on the fitting of flue-gas desulphurisation (FGD) equipment at the station. FLS Miljo installed the Mitsubishi Heavy Industries wet limestone systems, while Arup Energy and Mowlem took up a design–build partnership to undertake the civil works and construction of infrastructure. The work was completed in October 2003, and had a total cost of £100 million. As part of the new FGD retrofit two new chimneys 200 m (660 ft) high were constructed 194 m (636 ft) to the north of the existing chimneys, numbers 1 and 2. In January 2003 when the new chimney 2 was erected alongside the old chimney 2 the wind direction changed and began blowing from the north hitting the new chimney 2 first, at a speed of 42.6 km/h (26.5 mph; 11.83 m/s). This created a vortex and caused the old chimney 2 to start oscillating to a magnitude of 931 mm (36.7 in) at its height of 182.8 m (600 ft) and an angle of 600 seconds (0.166 degrees). The old chimneys were later demolished and used as built up ground to form the security gatehouse and parking area at the power station entrance.

== See also ==
- Megawatt Valley
- Cottam power stations
- Ratcliffe-on-Soar Power Station
