= W. H. Allen =

W. H. Allen may refer to:

== People ==
- William Henry Allen (1784–1813), American naval officer
- William Howard Allen (1790–1822), American naval officer
- William Henry Allen (academician) (1808–1882), American professor
- William Henry Allen (engineer) (1844–1926), British engineer
- William H. Allen (architect) (1858–1936), architect in New Haven, Connecticut
- W. H. Allen (artist) (1863–1943), English landscape artist

== Organisations ==
- W. H. Allen & Co., a London bookseller and publisher now owned by Penguin Random House
- W. H. Allen, Sons & Company Ltd., a British engineering company which merged to become Amalgamated Power Engineering

== See also ==
- W. H. Allen House, an historic house built in 1873 in Arkansas
