= Bill Allen =

Bill Allen may refer to:

- Bill Allen (footballer) (1889–1948), Australian footballer and cricketer
- Bill Allen (British politician) (1901–1973), MP for West Belfast
- Bill Allen (architect) (1914–1998) Canadian-born British architect
- Bill "Hoss" Allen (1922–1997), American radio disc jockey and musician
- Bill Allen (bowler) (1934–1992), American bowler
- Bill Allen (businessman) (1937–2022), American corporate executive and political financier
- Bill Allen (rockabilly musician) (1937–2013), American rockabilly musician
- Bill Allen (dentist) (born 1943), English dentist
- Bill Allen (basketball) (born 1945), American basketball player
- Bill Allen (Canadian politician) (1946–2026), Canadian politician from Saskatchewan
- Bill Allen (actor) (born 1962), American film and television actor
- Bill Allen (Missouri politician) (born 1965), member of the Missouri House of Representatives

== See also ==
- Billy Allen (1917–1981), English footballer
- Will Allen (disambiguation)
- William Allan (disambiguation)
- William Allen (disambiguation)
- Willie Allen (disambiguation)
