= Willie Allen =

Willie Allen may refer to:

- Willie Allen (basketball) (born 1949), American basketball player and director of the Growing Power urban farming program
- Willie Allen (racing driver) (born 1980), racing driver
- Willie Mae Allen (born 1937), American community activist and politician

== See also ==
- William Allen (disambiguation)
- Will Allen (disambiguation)
- Bill Allen (disambiguation)
- Allen (surname)
- William Allan (disambiguation)
