= Christopher Hinton, Baron Hinton of Bankside =

British nuclear engineer (1901–1983)

The Right Honourable The Lord Hinton of Bankside OM KBE FRS FREng
- Born: 12 May 1901; Tisbury, Wiltshire, England, UK
- Died: 22 June 1983 (aged 82); London, England, UK
- Known for: Calder Hall
- Awards: Wilhelm Exner Medal (1956); Castner Medal (1956); Albert Medal (1957); Rumford Medal (1970); James Watt International Medal (1973); Order of Merit (1976)
- Scientific career
- Fields: Nuclear

Christopher Hinton, Baron Hinton of Bankside OM KBE FRS FREng (12 May 1901 – 22 June 1983) was a British nuclear engineer, and supervisor of the construction of Calder Hall, the first large-scale nuclear power station in the West.

== Career ==
Hinton was born on 12 May 1901 at Tisbury, Wiltshire. He attended school in Chippenham where his father was a schoolmaster, and left school at 16 to become an engineering apprentice with the Great Western Railway at Swindon. At 22 he was awarded the William Henry Allen scholarship of the Institution of Mechanical Engineers to Trinity College, Cambridge, where he graduated with a first class honours degree.

Hinton then worked for Brunner Mond, later part of ICI, where he became Chief Engineer at the age of 29. At Brunner Mond he met Lillian Boyer (died 1973) whom he married in 1931. They had one daughter, Mary (1932–2014), who married Arthur Mole, son of Sir Charles Mole, director-general of the Ministry of Works.

During World War II, Hinton was seconded to the Ministry of Supply and became Deputy Director General, running ordnance factory construction and in charge of the Royal Filling Factories.

In 1946, Hinton was appointed Deputy Controller of Production, Atomic Energy, and in 1954 when the Atomic Energy Authority was formed, was appointed Member for Engineering and Production as managing director of 'Industrial Group Risley' which comprised the Risley headquarters and laboratories at Culcheth, Capenhurst, Windscale, Springfields and Dounreay plus factories at Springfields, Capenhurst, Windscale, Calder, Dounreay and Chapelcross. Hinton's department was responsible for the design and construction of most of Britain's major nuclear plants, including Windscale, Capenhurst, Springfields and Dounreay.

In 1957, Hinton became the first chairman of the Central Electricity Generating Board (CEGB). He retired in 1964 but right up until the time of his death the CEGB kept an office for him at their headquarters in Paternoster Square. For his 80th birthday the Research Division gave a party at which a birthday cake was equipped with 80 candles. These were so closely spaced that when he lit the central candle, the flame spread rapidly to all of the others.

In 1965 he worked for six months in the Ministry of Transport and afterwards became a special adviser to the World Bank. He served as Chairman of the International Executive Committee of the World Energy Conference, 1962–68.

He was created Baron Hinton of Bankside, of Dulwich in the County of London, a life peer, on 28 January 1965, and served as Chancellor of the University of Bath 1966 – 1979. He was appointed to the Order of Merit in 1976.

== Hinton Heavies ==
The English architectural critic Reyner Banham dubbed the first 500 MW units ordered by the CEGB the Hinton Heavies. A first for 500 MW power station design, the stations are listed below in the order that the CEGB released them for construction.

The Hinton Heavies
	Power station	County	Output (MW)	
01	West Burton	Nottinghamshire	2,000 MW	
02	Ferrybridge C	West Yorkshire	2,000 MW	
03	Eggborough	North Yorkshire	2,000 MW	
04	Kingsnorth	Kent	2,000 MW	Oil fired
05	Fawley	Hampshire	2,000 MW	Oil fired
06	Aberthaw B	South Wales	1,500 MW	
07	Ironbridge B	Shropshire	1,000 MW	
08	Fiddler's Ferry	Cheshire	2,000 MW	
09	Ratcliffe	Nottinghamshire	2,000 MW	
10	Cottam	Nottinghamshire	2,000 MW	
11	Pembroke	South West Wales	2,000 MW	Oil fired
12	Rugeley B	Staffordshire	1,000 MW	
13	Didcot A	Oxfordshire	2,000 MW	
14	Ince B	Cheshire	1,000 MW	Oil Fired

The 500 MW standard unit design was subsequently slightly scaled up to 660 MW, using the same main and reheat steam conditions. These larger units were constructed from 1967 onwards at Drax, Grain and Littlebrook power stations. Similar 660 MW turbogenerators were also installed at all of Britain's AGR nuclear power stations, albeit with radically different steam-raising plant.

The 660 MW units were the largest generating plant, and the last pure steam-cycle plant, ever constructed by the CEGB before its break-up and privatisation in the 1990s.

== The Hinton Cup and Hinton Trophy ==
During his time at the Central Electricity Generating Board (CEGB) he commissioned the Hinton Cup, a piece of silverware that would be presented annually to the power station that displayed good housekeeping in the workplace. The citation to go with the cup reads 'This cup is presented to the Power Station judged to have reached the highest attainment in economy and efficiency of operation and maintenance with particular reference to attractiveness and good housekeeping'.

The cup was first won by Meaford A power station in 1959 and was last won by West Burton Power Station prior to the divestment of the CEGB. The Hinton Trophy was the equivalent award for the best Transmission District. Because of the miners' strike there was no competition in 1984–85. To commemorate the thirty years of awarding the cup and trophy a presentation plate was manufactured by Gladstone Pottery Museum in Stoke-on-Trent.

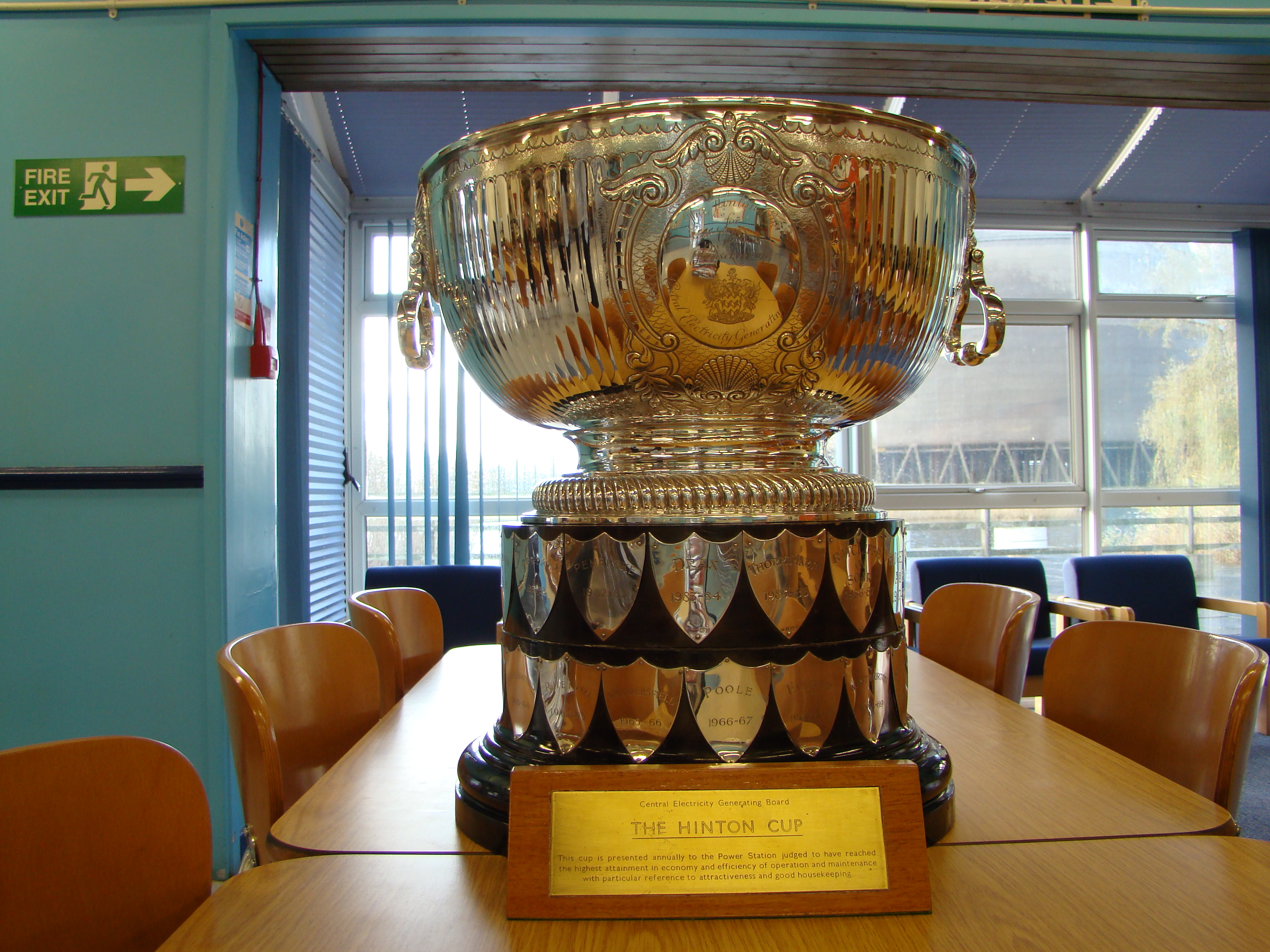
Hinton Cup

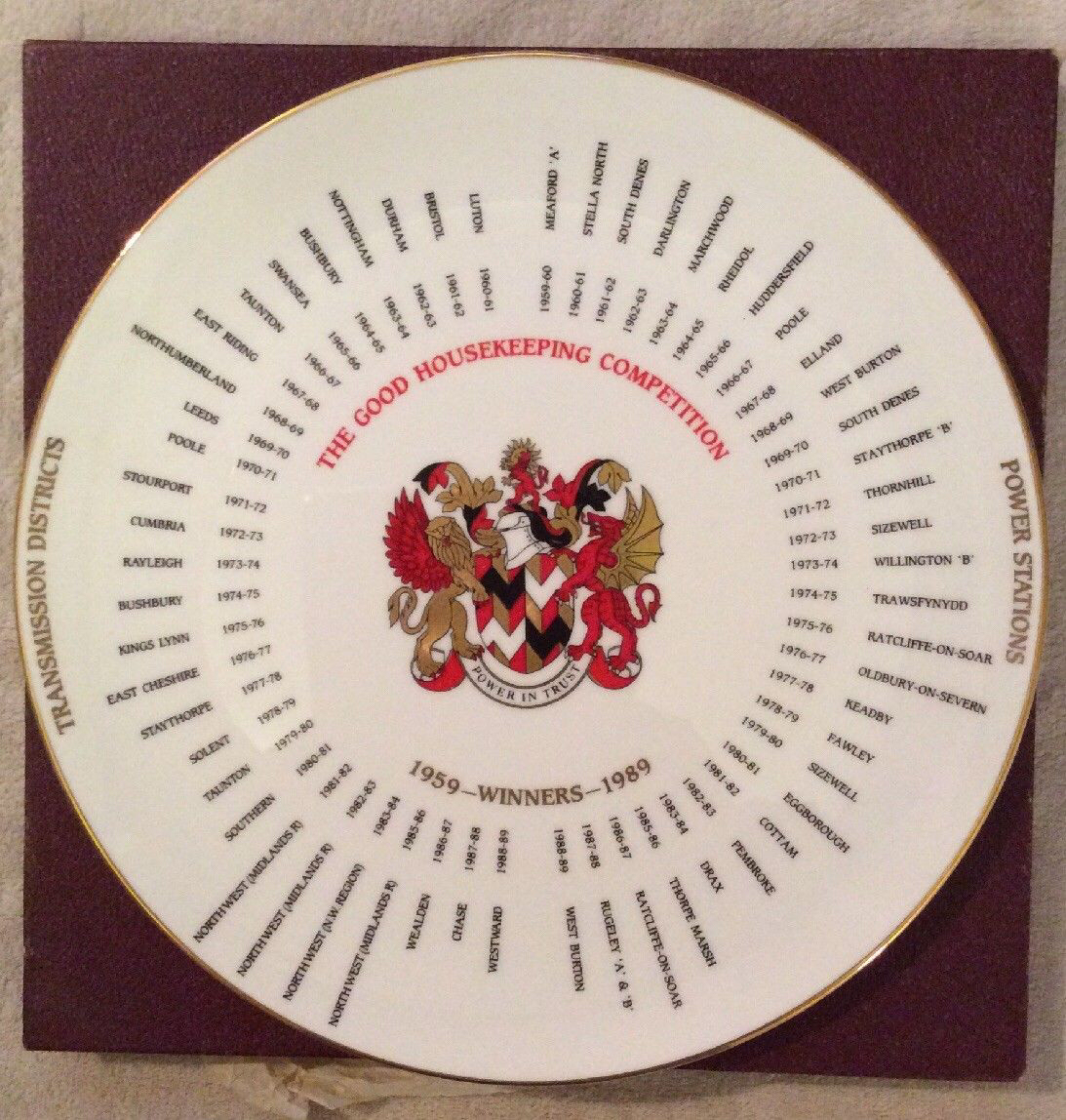
30 year commemorative plate

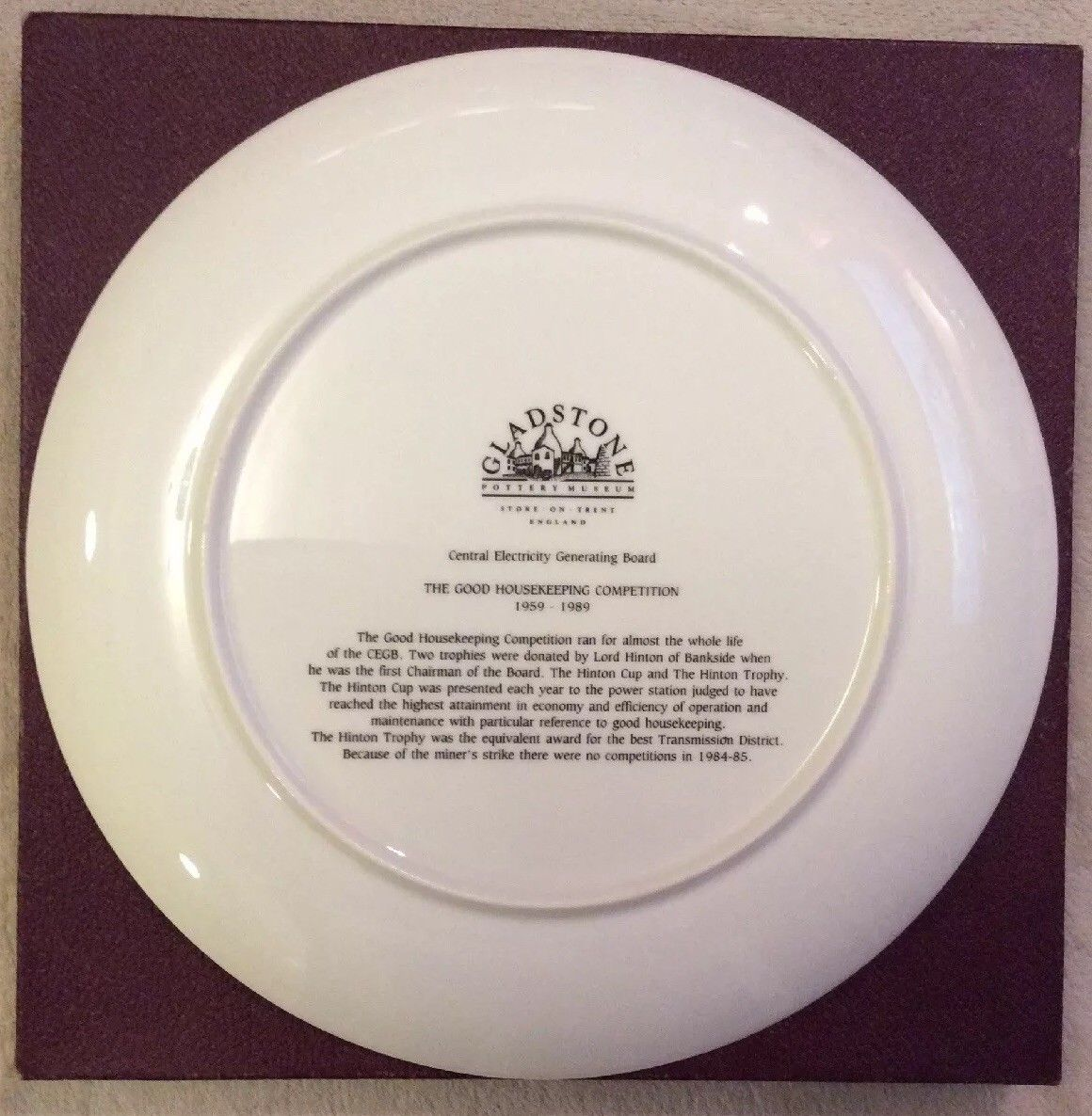
30 year commemorative plate

The Hinton Cup & Trophy For Good Housekeeping
	Power Station	Year	Transmission District
01	Meaford	1959–1960
02	Stella North	1960–1961	Luton
03	South Denes	1961–1962	Bristol
04	Darlington	1962–1963	Durham
05	Marchwood	1963–1964	Nottingham
06	Rheidol	1964–1965	Bushbury
07	Huddersfield	1965–1966	Swansea
08	Poole	1966–1967	Taunton
09	Elland	1967–1968	East Riding
10	West Burton	1968–1969	Northumberland
11	South Denes	1969–1970	Leeds
12	Staythorpe	1970–1971	Poole
13	Thornhill	1971–1972	Stourport
14	Sizewell A	1972–1973	Cumbria
15	Willington B	1973–1974	Rayleigh
16	Trawsfynydd	1974–1975	Bushbury
17	Ratcliffe-on-Soar	1975–1976	King's Lynn
18	Oldbury on Severn	1976–1977	East Cheshire
19	Keadby	1977–1978	Staythorpe
20	Fawley	1978–1979	Solent
21	Sizewell	1979–1980	Taunton
22	Eggborough	1980–1981	Southern
23	Cottam	1981–1982	Northwest (Midlands Region)
24	Pembroke	1982–1983	Northwest (Midlands Region)
25	Drax	1983–1984	Northwest (Northwest Region)
26	Thorpe Marsh	1985–1986	Northwest (Midlands Region)
27	Ratcliffe-on-Soar	1986–1987	Wealdon
28	Rugeley A & B	1987–1988	Chase
29	West Burton	1988–1989	Westward

== Awards and achievements ==
- Knighted 1951
- Fellow of the Royal Society 1954
- Wilhelm Exner Medal, 1956
- Knight Commander of the Order of the British Empire, 1957
- Fellow of Trinity College, 1957
- Honorary Degree (DSc), University of Oxford 1957
- Honorary Degree (ScD), University of Cambridge 1960
- On 28 January 1965 he was made a life peer as Baron Hinton of Bankside, of Dulwich in the County of London.
- President of the Institution of Mechanical Engineers, 1966
- Foreign Associate, National Academy of Engineering, 1976
- Order of Merit, 1976
- Honorary Degree (Doctor of Science), University of Bath, 1966
- Chancellor of the University of Bath 1966–80
- James Watt International Medal 1973
- First President of the Royal Academy of Engineering
- DRS Class 37 diesel locomotive 37409 named Lord Hinton at Crewe Gresty Bridge Depot Open Day, 10 July 2010
- Lord Hinton bulk carrier ship (completed 1986, broken up 2015)

Coat of arms of Christopher Hinton, Baron Hinton of Bankside
Crest A demi-talbot Argent gorged with an ancient crown Or in the mouth a batton Or tipped Sable. Escutcheon Azure on a pile Or between seven roses Argent barbed and seeded Proper three barrulets dancetty Gules. Supporters Dexter a pantheon Gules semy of mullets Or, sinister a male griffin Gules armed langued and rayed Or each gorged with an ancient crown affixed thereto a chain reflexed over the back Or. Motto Firm And Faithful

Academic offices
New institution	Chancellor of the University of Bath; 1966–1980	Succeeded by Sir Frank Kearton
Professional and academic associations
Preceded by Harold Norman Gwynne Allen	President of the Institution of Mechanical Engineers; 1966	Succeeded by Hugh Graham Conway
Business positions
New title	Chairman of the Central Electricity Generating Board; 1957–1964	Succeeded by Sir Stanley Brown
