= Will Allen =

Will Allen may refer to:

- Will Allen (safety) (born 1982), American football safety
- Will Allen (cornerback) (born 1978), American football cornerback
- Will Allen (urban farmer) (born 1949), American basketball player and director of the Growing Power urban farming program

== See also ==
- William Allen (disambiguation)
- Willie Allen (disambiguation)
- Bill Allen (disambiguation)
- William Allan (disambiguation)
- William Van Alen (1883–1954), American architect
- Will Allen Gozum (born 1999), Filipino basketball player
- Allen (surname)
