= Glyn England =

British electrical engineer and politician

- Born: 19 April 1921; Llantrisant, Cardiff, South Wales
- Died: 19 June 2013 (aged 92)
- Education: London School of Economics
- Occupation: Electricity Generation
- Known for: CEGB

Glyn England (19 April 1921 – 19 June 2013) was a British electrical engineer.

== Early life ==
He attended Penarth County Grammar School (now Stanwell School), then Queen Mary College in London.

== Career ==
Prior to World War II, he was scientific assistant with the Road Research Laboratory.

In the 1950s, he served as a Labour Party councillor in Hertfordshire; he later became a founder member of the Social Democratic party.

=== CEGB ===
Glyn started working for the Central Electricity Generating Board as an electrical engineer supervising installation work. He finished up as chairman from 1977 to 1982, taking over from Sir Arthur Hawkins and being replaced by Walter Marshall, Baron Marshall of Goring.

A deal was signed with Glyn of the CEGB and Charles Chevrier, director-general of Électricité de France for the construction of a £550 million 2000MW HVDC Cross-Channel link between England and France. Each would cover the cost of four of the eight cables crossing the channel.

In 1981 he received an Honorary Doctorate from the University of Bath.

Business positions
Preceded by Sir Arthur Hawkins	Chairman of the Central Electricity Generating Board; 1977–1982	Succeeded by Walter Marshall, Baron Marshall of Goring
