= Central Electricity Generating Board =

UK electricity supplier, 1958–2001

- Type: State owned government body and regulator
- Industry: Energy: electricity
- Predecessor: Central Electricity Authority (1955–1957), British Electricity Authority (1948–1955)
- Founded: 1 January 1958
- Defunct: 9 November 2001
- Fate: Privatised throughout the 1990s
- Successors: National Grid Company (1990); Office of Electricity Regulation; National Power (1991); Powergen (1991); Nuclear Electric (1995)
- Headquarters: London, United Kingdom
- Area served: England and Wales
- Products: Electricity generation, transmission and bulk sales
- Revenue: 0.4264 p/kWh sold (1957–1958), 3.0371 p/kWh sold (1981–1982)
- Operating income: £340.3 million (1957–1958), £6,363.6 million (1981–1982)
- Net income: Net earnings £48.3 million (1957–1958), £295.7 million (1981–1982)
- Number of employees: 65,410 (1972), 55,487 (1982)

The Central Electricity Generating Board (CEGB) was responsible for electricity generation, transmission and bulk sales in England and Wales from 1958 until privatisation of the electricity industry in the 1990s.

It was established on 1 January 1958 to assume the functions of the Central Electricity Authority (1955–1957), which had in turn replaced the British Electricity Authority (1948–1955). The Electricity Council was also established in January 1958, as the coordinating and policy-making body for the British electricity supply industry.

== Responsibilities ==
The CEGB was responsible for electricity generation, transmission and bulk sales in England and Wales, whilst in Scotland electricity generation was carried out by the South of Scotland Electricity Board and the North of Scotland Hydro-Electric Board.

The CEGB's duty was to develop and maintain an efficient, coordinated and economical system of supply of electricity in bulk for England and Wales, and for that purpose to generate or acquire supplies of electricity and to provide bulk supplies of electricity for the area electricity boards for distribution. It also had power to supply bulk electricity to the Scottish boards or electricity undertakings outside Great Britain.

The organisation was unusual in that most of its senior staff were professional engineers, supported in financial and risk-management areas.

== Corporate structure ==
=== Background ===
In 1954, six years after nationalisation, the Government appointed the Herbert Committee to examine the efficiency and organisation of the electricity industry. The committee found that the British Electricity Authority's dual roles of electricity generation and supervision had led to central concentration of responsibility and to duplication between headquarters and divisional staff which led to delays in the commissioning of new stations. The Committee's recommendations were enacted by the Electricity Act 1957 which established the Electricity Council to oversee the industry and the CEGB with responsibility for generation and transmission.

=== Constitution ===
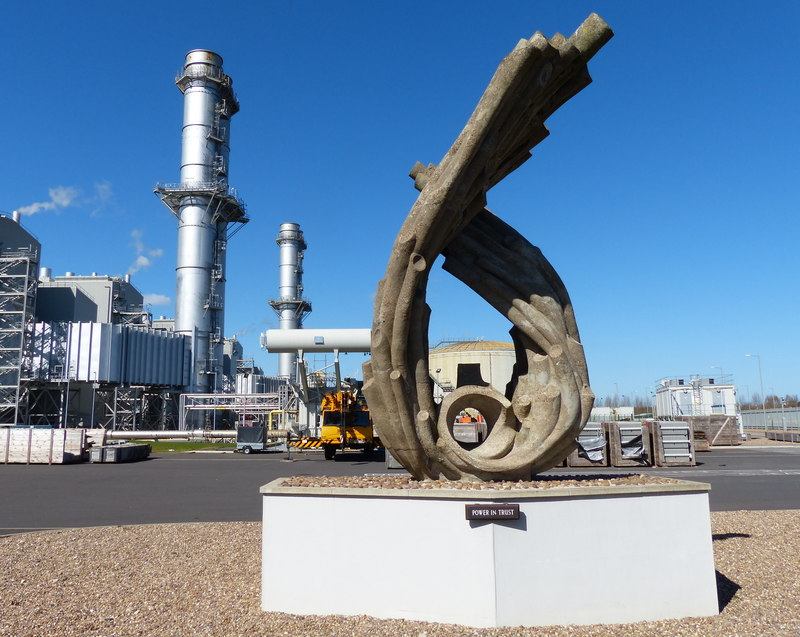
Power in Trust (1961) by Norman Sillman, at Staythorpe Power Station

The CEGB was established by section 2 of the Electricity Act 1957. It consisted of a Generating Board comprising a chairman and seven to nine full-time or part-time members, appointed by the Minister of Power, who had experience or capacity in "the generation or supply of electricity, industrial, commercial or financial matters, applied science, administration, or the organisation of workers". The power of appointment later devolved to the Minister of Technology, then to the Secretary of State for Trade and Industry.

There were six chairmen of the CEGB:

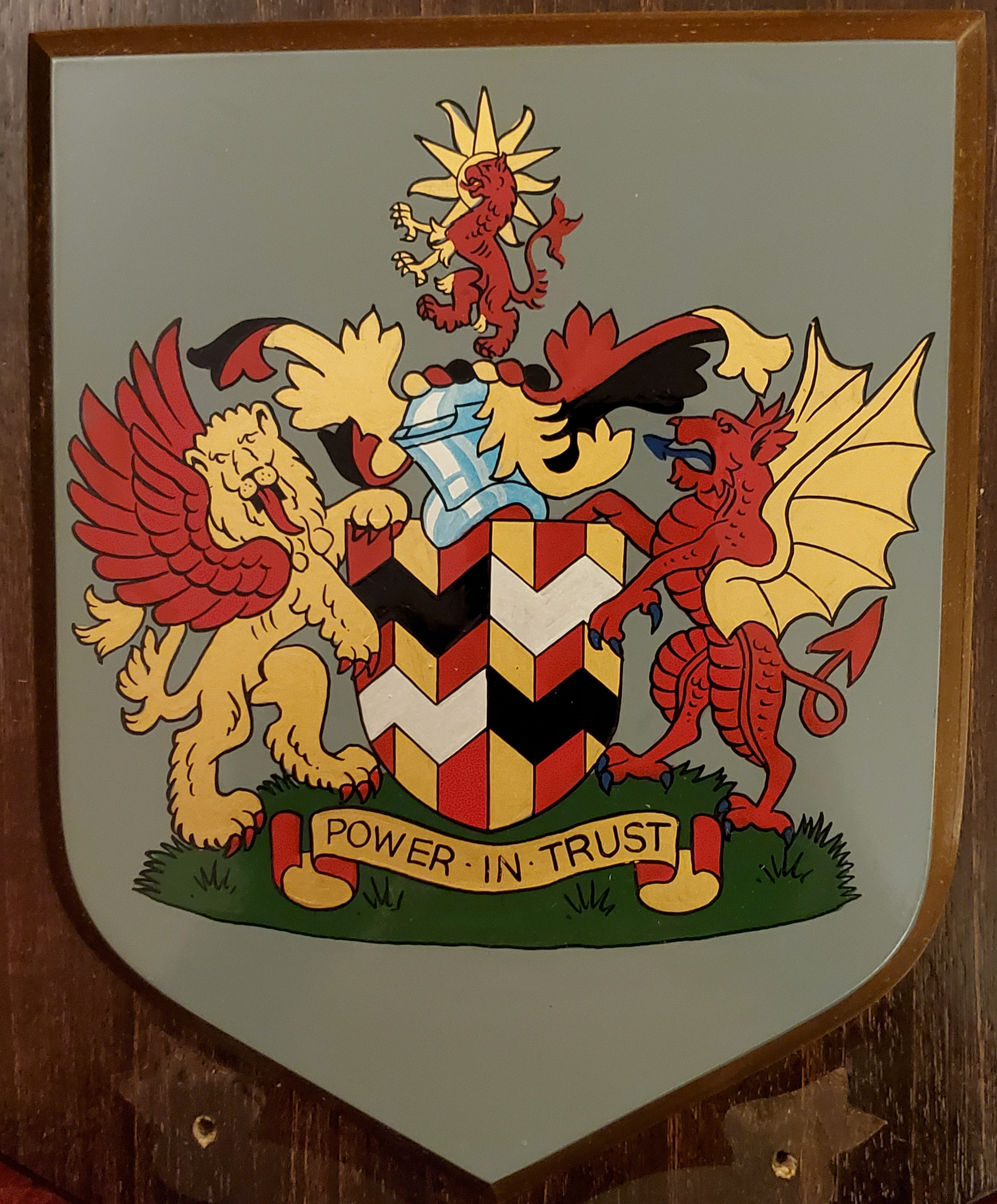
- CEGB "Griffin" coat of arms
  Christopher Hinton, Baron Hinton of Bankside, served from 1957 to 1964,
- Sir Stanley Brown served from 1965 to 1972,
- Sir Arthur Hawkins from 1972 to 1977,
- Glyn England from 1977 to 1982,
- Walter Marshall, Baron Marshall of Goring from 1982 to 1989,
- Gil Blackman was appointed chairman in January 1989 until 1990.

The executive comprised the chairman and the full-time board members. The Headquarters Operations Department provided a service to the board and executive and could supply specialist staff.

The chairman and two other members of the board plus the chairmen of the area boards were members of the Electricity Council.

=== Organisation ===
The design, construction and development functions associated with power stations and transmission was undertaken by two divisions: the Generation Development and Construction Division based in Cheltenham and then Barnwood Gloucester, and the Transmission Development and Construction Division based in Guildford. In 1979 the Transmission Division had been restructured as the Transmission and Technical Services Division based in Guildford, and a Technology Planning and Research Division based in London, the latter was formed from the Research Division System Technical and Generation Studies Branches.

A Corporate Strategy Department was formed in 1981 from some of the Planning Department. A Nuclear Operations Support Group was also formed in 1981 to provide expert support.

The sculpture "Power in Trust" from the CEGB logo was made by Norman Sillman to represent a hand made from boiler pipes and a turbine, it was commissioned in the 1961 for the opening of Staythorpe B Power Station.

When first constituted the CEGB's London headquarters was at the former Central Electricity Authority's building in Winsley Street W1, there were also offices in Buchanan House, 24/30 Holborn, London, EC1.

=== Employees ===
There were a total of 131,178 employees in the electricity supply industry 1989, composed as follows:

Electricity supply industry employees 1989
	Electricity Council	CEGB	Area boards	Total
Managerial	122	780	535	1,437
Technical and scientific	444	13,098	8,473	22,015
Administrative and Sales	566	7,142	30,146	37,854
Industrial	125	26,611	41,142	67,878
Trainees and apprentices	0	In Industrial	1,985	1,985
Total	1,257	47,631	82,291	131,178

== Infrastructure ==
The CEGB spent more on industrial construction than any other organisation in the UK. In 1958, about 40 power stations were being planned or constructed at a capital cost of £800 million.

=== Power stations ===
Those public supply power stations that were in operation at any time between 1958 and 1990 were owned and operated by the CEGB. In 1971–1972, there were 183 power stations on 156 sites, with an installed capacity of 58,880 MW, and supplied 190,525 GWh. By 1981–1982 there were 108 power stations with a capacity of 55,185 MW and supplied 210,289 GWh.

- Lists of power stations in the United Kingdom
- List of power stations in England
- List of power stations in Wales
- Nuclear power in the United Kingdom

=== National Grid ===
At its inception the CEGB operated 2,763 circuit-km of high-tension 275 kV supergrid. The growth of the high voltage National Grid over the lifetime of the CEGB is demonstrated in the following table.

Length in circuit km of 275 kV and 400 kV transmission system
Year	1958	1963	1968	1973	1978	1983	1988
275 kV, km	2,763	5,923	5,403	4,471	4,442	4,303	4,069
400 kV, km	0	85	4,927	7,905	9,319	9,531	9,822

=== Substations ===
In 1981–1982 there was a total of 203 substations operating at 275/400 kV, these sub-stations included 570 transformers operating at 275/400 kV.

== Operations ==
=== Control of generation and the National Grid ===
At the centre of operations was the National Control Centre of the National Grid in London, which was part of the control hierarchy for the system. The National Control Centre was based in Bankside House from 1962. There were also both area and district Grid Control Areas, which were originally at Newcastle upon Tyne, Leeds, Manchester, Nottingham, Birmingham, St Albans, East Grinstead and Bristol. The shift control engineers who worked in these control centres would cost, schedule and load-dispatch an economic commitment of generation to the main interconnected system (the 400/275/132 kV network) at an adequate level of security. They also had information about the running costs and availability of every power producing plant in England and Wales. They constantly anticipated demand, monitored and instructed power stations to increase, reduce or stop electricity production. They used the "merit order", a ranking of each generator in power stations based upon how much they cost to produce electricity. The objective was to ensure that electricity production and transmission was achieved at the lowest possible cost.

In 1981 the three-tier corporate transmission structure: National Control, area control rooms in the regions, and district control rooms (areas) was changed to a two-tier structure by merging the area and district control rooms.

=== Electricity supplies and sales ===
The electricity generated, supplied and sold by the CEGB, in GWh, was as follows:

CEGB electricity supplies and sales
Numbers in GWh	Year						
Numbers in GWh	1958/9	1963/4	1968/9	1973/4	1978/9	1983/4	1988/9
Electricity generated	91,753	141,655	187,064	217,542	238,148	229,379	250,699
Electricity supplied	86,233	132,091	173,418	201,763	222,091	212,728	231,909
Imports	500	2,016	2,991	3,521	3,253	5,214	16,416
Exports	598	1,054	2,046	551	736	176	3
Total supplies on system	86,135	133,053	174,363	204,733	224,608	217,766	248,322
Used in transmission	2,174	3,719	5,216	4,103	4,961	5,200	5,619
Sales to direct customers	3,025	1,890	3,005	4,937	5,668	3,944	4,260
Sales to area boards	80,936	127,444	166,142	195,688	213,979	208,623	238,443
Generated by area boards	1	4	5	6	6	42	106
Purchases by area boards from private sources	381	138	210	334	374	571	2,010
Used in distribution	6,245	7,950	9,093	11,410	14,778	13,666	14,338
Sales by area boards	75,073	119,634	157,264	184,618	199,581	195,570	226,221

Note: imports are bulk supplies from the South of Scotland and France and from private sources, exports are bulk supplies to the South of Scotland and France.

=== Financial statistics ===
A summary of the income and expenditure of the CEGB (in £ million) is as follows:

CEGB financial summary
Numbers in £ million	Year						
Numbers in £ million	1958/9	1963/4	1968/9	1973/4	1978/9	1983/4	1988/9
Income from electricity sales	505.8	821.5	1,278.4	1,783.5	5,093.0	9,026.3	11,467.8
Other income	14.1	20.3	25.4	22.8	30.4	535.7	906.0
Total income	519.9	841.8	1,303.8	1,806.3	5,123.4	9,562.0	12,373.8
Expenditure	429.6	657.5	980.8	1,652.9	4,448.2		
Operating Profit	90.3	184.3	323.8	153.4	675.2	917.7	777.2
Interest	62.5	113.9	222.4	339.0	423.8	450.3	159.3
Profit after interest	27.3	70.4	100.6	-185.6	251.4	464.1	607.2
Revenue account expenditure
Fuel		284.1	384.7	707.7	2,379.4	4,008.4	4,268.5
Salaries		143.3	200.9	313.4	750.1	1,454.4	1,992.0
Depreciation		138.3	250.9	328.0	582.2	1,295.1	1,765.0
Interest		113.9	22.4	339.0	423.8	450.3	159.3
Rates		24.1	38.1	64.2	167.5	322.5	496.0
Other costs		67.7	106.2	246.6	568.9	1,563.9	2,715.0
Total costs		71.4	1,203.2	1,991.9	4,871.9	9,097.9	11,766.6
Capital expenditure
Generation	142.3	229.9	207.6	222.2	433.4	766.1	431.8
Main transmission	30.8	77.1	118.0	33.7	61.6	150.9	76.2
Other	0.9	3.1	4.2	10.8	19.4	21.8	96.6
Total CEGB	174.0	310.1	329.8	266.7	514.4	938.8	604.6
Area boards	83.4	159.1	139.1	140.9	198.1	393.5	854.5
Total capital expenditure	257.4	469.5	469.3	408.2	714.7	1,605.2	1,471.8

=== Regions ===
Detailed control of operational matters such planning, electricity generation, transmission and maintenance were delegated to five geographical regions. From January 1971, each region had a director-general, a director of generation, a director of operational planning, a director of transmission, a financial controller, a controller of scientific services and a personnel manager.

==== Midlands Region ====
Regional headquarters: Haslucks Green Road, Shirley, Solihull, West Midlands.

The Midlands Region was responsible for the operation of 38 power stations, over 170 sub-stations and nearly 2,000 miles (3,200 km) of grid transmission line in an area that covered 11,000 square miles (28,000 km^{2}). The region produced more than a quarter of the electricity used in England and Wales and had a major share of the industrial construction programme mounted by the CEGB during the 1960s.

In 1948, the total generating capacity of all the power stations in the region was 2,016 MW only a little more than a modern 2,000 MW station. By 1957 the region's capacity was up to 4,000 MW, doubling to 8,000 MW by 1966 and rising to 14,000 MW in 1969 and 16,000 MW by 1971.

Previous chairmen of the Midlands Region were Arthur Hawkins, Gilbert Blackman, and R. L. Batley.

Prior to 1968 the Midlands Region was divided into the West Midlands Division and the East Midlands Division. The number of power stations, installed capacity and electricity supplied in the Midlands Region was:

Midlands Region
Year	No. of power stations	No. of sites	Installed capacity of generators, MW	Electricity supplied, GWh
1971–1972	36	26	16,256.0	54,509.849
1980–1981	26	19	15,619.0	70,586.354
1981–1982	22	17	14,655.5	71,455.615

==== North Eastern Region ====
Regional Headquarters: Merrion Centre, Leeds (1971). Beckwith Knowle, Otley Road, Harrogate.

Extending through Northumberland, Durham, Yorkshire and North Lincolnshire the North Eastern Region was responsible for the operation of 32 power stations capable of producing 8,000 MW of electricity. 108 substations and over 1,200 route miles of overhead lines transmitted the electricity to the Yorkshire Electricity Board and the North Eastern Electricity Board for passing onto the customer.

A previous chairman of the North Eastern Region was P.J. Squire.

Prior to 1968, the North Eastern Region was divided into the Northern Division and the Yorkshire Division. The number of power stations, installed capacity and electricity supplied in the North Eastern Region was:

North Eastern Region
Year	No. of power stations	No. of sites	Installed capacity of generators, MW	Electricity supplied, GWh
1971–1972	30	26	11,568.5	41,380.793
1981–1982	18	15	11,702.0	50,020.604

==== North Western Region ====
Regional Headquarters: 825 Wilmslow Road, Manchester, M20 (1971). Europa House, Bird Hall Lane, Cheadle Heath, Stockport.

Previous chairman of the North Western Region were J.L. Ashworth and G.B. Jackson.

The number of power stations, installed capacity and electricity supplied in the North Western Region was:

North Western Region
Year	No. of power stations	No. of sites	Installed capacity of generators, MW	Electricity supplied, GWh
1971–1972	37	36	7,248.662	19,859.890
1981–1982	19	19	6,532.225	26,007.229

==== South Eastern Region ====
Regional Headquarters: Bankside House, Sumner Street, London.

Past chairman of the South Eastern Region were G.N. Stone, H.J. Bennett and F.W. Skelcher.

Prior to 1968 the South Eastern Region was divided into the North Thames Division and the South Thames Division. The number of power stations, installed capacity and electricity supplied in the South Eastern Region was:

South Eastern Region
Year	No. of power stations	No. of sites	Installed capacity of generators, MW	Electricity supplied, GWh
1963–1964	73	59	9,957.171	30,355.353
1971–1972	46	37	13,114.804	42,005.335
1980–1981	35	33	12,556.904	22,764.492
1981–1982	28	28	12,758.404	23,637.504
1983–1984	20	20	10,628.	26,519.474

==== South Western Region ====
Regional Headquarters: 15–23 Oakfield Grove, Clifton, Bristol (until 1971). Bridgwater Road, Bedminster Down, Bristol (from 1978, now The Pavilions). Previous chairman of the South Western Region were Douglas Pask, Roy Beatt, A.C. Thirtle and R.H. Coates. Prior to 1968 the South Western Region was divided into the Southern Division, the Western Division and the South Wales Division. The number of power stations, installed capacity and electricity supplied in the South Western Region was:

South Western Region
Year	No. of power stations	No. of sites	Installed capacity of generators, MW	Electricity supplied, GWh
1971–1972	34	31	10,692.085	32,769.175
1980–1981	22	20	13,423.450	40,925.009
1981–1982	21	19	12,988.950	39,167.919
1983–1984	18	16	10,839	38,956.301

=== Supplies to area boards ===
The supplies of electricity from the CEGB Regions to the area electricity boards in 1971–1972 and 1981–1982 were as follows. The average charge in 1971–1972 was 0.6519 pence/kWh, in 1981–1982 the charge was 3.0615 pence/kWh.

Electricity supplies to area boards
Area board	Electricity sold 1971–1972, GWh	Electricity sold 1981–1982, GWh
London	14,472	16,173
South Eastern	12,586	14,730
Southern	17,744	21,073
South Western	9,030	10,817
Eastern	20,469	23,661
East Midlands	16,439	18,596
Midlands	19,587	20,209
South Wales	9,638	10,470
Merseyside and North Wales	13,672	14,783
Yorkshire	19,640	21,420
North Eastern	11,296	13,272
North Western	18,614	18,988
Total	183,187	204,192

During the lifetime of the CEGB peak demand had more than doubled from 19,311 MW in 1958 to 47,925 MW in 1987. Sales of electricity had increased from 79.7 TWh in 1958 to 240 TWh in 1988.

=== Research and development ===
The CEGB had an extensive R&D section with its three principal laboratories at Leatherhead (Central Electricity Research Laboratories, CERL) (opened by the Minister of Power in May 1962), Marchwood Engineering Laboratory (MEL), and Berkeley Nuclear Laboratories (BNL). There were also five regional facilities and four project groups, North, South, Midlands and the Transmission Project Group. These scientific service departments (SSD) had a base in each region. A major SSD role was solving engineering problems with the several designs of 500 MW units. These were a significant increase in unit size and had many teething problems, most of which were solved to result in reliable service and gave good experience towards the design of the 660 MW units.

In the 1970s and 1980s, for the real-time control of power stations the R&D team developed the Cutlass programming language and application system. After privatisation, CUTLASS systems in National Power were phased out and replaced largely with Advanced Plant Management System (APMS) – a SCADA solution developed in partnership by RWE npower (a descendant company of CEGB) and Thales UK. APMS itself has since become obsolete. However, Eggborough was the last station, particularly unit 2; fully operated using APMS until its decommissioning in 2017.

In contrast, PowerGen, later taken over by E.ON (which further split to form Uniper), undertook a programme to port the entire system to current hardware. The most current version of Cutlass, 'PT-Cutlass Kit 9', runs on Motorola PPC-based hardware, with the engineering workstation and administrative functions provided by a standard Microsoft Windows PC. It is fully compatible (with a few minor exceptions) with the DEC PDP-11 version (kit 1) released by PowerGen and has a high level of compatibility with the final version of kit 1 formerly used at National Power. It was used at three UK power stations: Ratcliffe-on-Soar, Cottam, and Fiddlers Ferry until their decommissioning.

== Policies and strategies ==
The CEGB was subject to examination from external bodies and formed policies and strategies to meet its responsibilities.

=== External ===
A 1978 government white paper Re-organisation of the Electricity Supply in England and Wales proposed the creation of an Electricity Corporation to unify the fragmented structure of the industry. Parliamentary constraints prevented its enactment.

A report by the Monopolies and Mergers Commission, Central Electricity Generating Board: a Report on the Operation by the Board of its system for the generation and supply of Electricity in bulk was published in 1981. The report found that the CEGB's operations were efficient but that their investment appraisal operated against the public interest.

=== Internal ===
In 1964, the CEGB chose the Advanced Gas-cooled Reactor, developed by the United Kingdom Atomic Energy Authority, for a programme of new station construction. The five stations were: Dungeness B, Hinkley Point B, Hartlepool, Heysham and Hunterston B.

In 1976, the CEGB introduced an accelerated power station closure programme. On 25 October, 23 power stations were closed and 18 partly closed, with a combined capacity of 2,884 MW. Six further stations with a capacity of 649 MW were closed in March 1977.

In 1979, the CEGB and the National Coal Board entered a joint understanding that the CEGB would endeavour to take 75 million tonnes of coal per year to 1985 provided the pithead price did not increase above the rate of inflation.

In 1981, the CEGB applied for planning consent to build a 1,200 MW pressurised water reactor at Sizewell. There was a lengthy public inquiry.

In 1981, the CEGB introduced another accelerated power station closure programme. On 26 October, 16 power stations were closed with a combined capacity of 3,402 MW. A further 1,320 MW of capacity was maintained unmanned in reserve.

== Privatisation ==
The electricity market in the UK was built upon the break-up of the CEGB into four companies in the 1990s. Its generation (or upstream) activities were transferred to three generating companies, 'PowerGen', 'National Power', and 'Nuclear Electric' (later 'British Energy', eventually 'EDF Energy'); and its transmission (or downstream) activities to the 'National Grid Company'.

The shares in National Grid were distributed to the regional electricity companies prior to their own privatisation in 1990. PowerGen and National Power were privatised in 1991, with 60% stakes in each company sold to investors, the remaining 40% being held by the UK government. The privatisation process was initially delayed as it was concluded that the 'earlier decided nuclear power plant assets in National Power' would not be included in the private National Power. A new company was formed, Nuclear Electric, which would eventually own and operate the nuclear power assets, and the nuclear power stations were held in public ownership for a number of years.

In 1995, the government sold its 40% stakes, and the assets of Nuclear Electric and Scottish Nuclear were both combined and split. The combination process merged operations of UK's eight most advanced nuclear plants – seven advanced gas-cooled reactor(AGR) and one pressurised water reactor (PWR) – into a new private company founded in 1996, 'British Energy' (now 'EDF Energy'). The splitting process created a separate company in 1996 called 'Magnox Electric' to hold the older Magnox reactors, later combined with BNFL.

Although electricity privatisation began in 1990, the CEGB continued to exist until the Central Electricity Generating Board (Dissolution) Order 2001 (SI 2001/3421), a statutory instrument, came into force on 9 November 2001.

Powergen is now E.ON UK, owned by the German utility company E.ON, who then further split to form Uniper, who own the majority of the former E.On conventional power generation. National Power split into a UK business, 'Innogy', now 'RWE npower', owned by the German utility company RWE, and an international business, 'International Power', now Engie Energy International and owned by the French company Engie.

== Arms ==
Coat of arms of Central Electricity Generating Board
Notes Granted 6 November 1958 Crest On a wreath Or Gules and Sable a male griffin segreant Gules armed langued and rayed Or behind the head a sun in splendour Gold. Escutcheon Paly gules and Or two bars dancetty the upper per pale Sable and Argent the lower per pale Argent and Sable. Supporters On the dexter side a lion guardant Or winged Gules and on the sinister side a dragon Gules winged Or. Motto Power In Trust

== Publications ==
- Nuclear Know-How! – with an element of truth. Published by the Central Electricity Generating Board Publicity Services – South East, Bankside House, Sumner Street, London SE1 9JU (n.d. but published c. 1980s–1990s). 20 pages.
- Central Electricity Generating Board, Annual Report and Accounts (published annually).
- Central Electricity Generating Board, Statistical Yearbook (published annually).
- H.R. Johnson et al., The Mechanism of Corrosion by Fuel Impurities (Central Electricity Generating Board; Marchwood Engineering Laboratories, 1963).
- Central Electricity Research Laboratories, Symposium on chimney plume rise and dispersion, Atmospheric Environment (1967) 1, 351–440.
- Central Electricity Generating Board, Modern Power Station Practice, 5 volumes (Oxford, Pergamon Press, 1971).
- Central Electricity Generating Board, How Electricity Is Made and Transmitted (CEGB, London, 1972).
- Central Electricity Generating Board, Submission to the Commission on Energy and the Environment (CEGB, London 1981).
- Central Electricity Generating Board, Acid Rain (London, CEGB, 1984).
- Central Electricity Generating Board, Achievements in technology, planning and research (CEGB, London, 1985).
- Central Electricity Generating Board, Advances in Power Station Construction (Oxford, Pergamon Press, 1986).
- Central Electricity Generating Board, European Year of the Environment: the CEGB Achievements (CEGB, London, 1986).
- Central Electricity Generating Board, Drax Power Station, Proposed Flue Gas Desulphurisation Plant (London, CEGB, 1988).

== See also ==
- Timeline of the UK electricity supply industry
- Energy policy of the United Kingdom
- Energy in the United Kingdom
