= Walter Marshall, Baron Marshall of Goring =

British peer and scientist

The Lord Marshall of Goring
- Born: 5 March 1932; Rumney, Cardiff, UK
- Died: 20 February 1996 (aged 63); London, UK
- Education: Birmingham University
- Spouse: Ann V Sheppard
- Awards: Maxwell Medal (1964)
- Scientific career
- Fields: Nuclear
- Workplaces: Central Electricity Generating Board
- Doctoral advisor: Rudolf Peierls

Signature
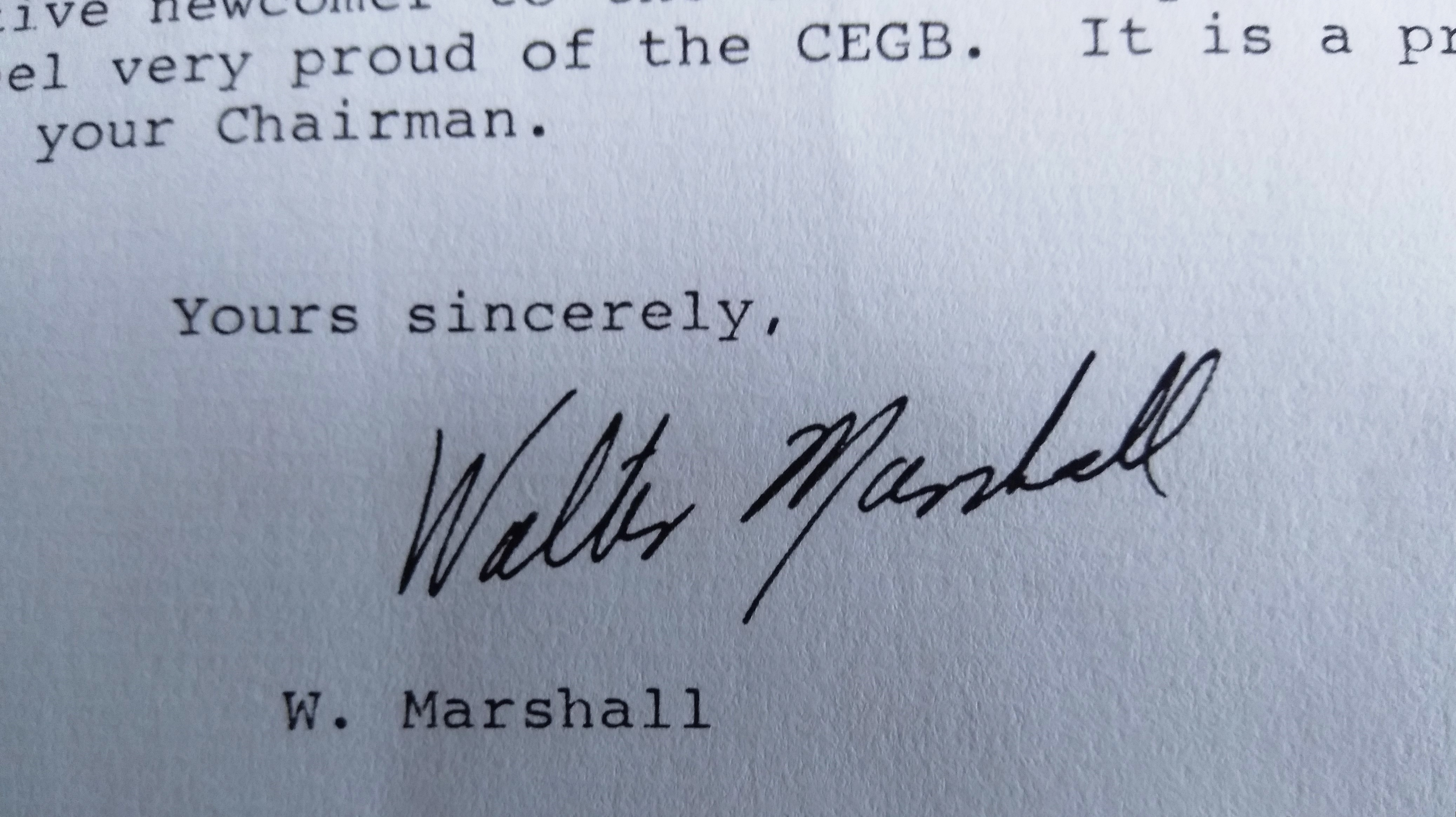

Walter Charles Marshall, Baron Marshall of Goring CBE FRS (5 March 1932 – 20 February 1996) was a noted theoretical physicist and leader in the UK's energy sector.

== Early life ==
The son of Frank Marshall and Amy Pearson, he attended the grammar school St Illtyd's Boys College (now St Illtyd's Catholic High School).

He studied mathematical physics at Birmingham University and gained a PhD there under Rudolf Peierls.

== Career ==
He joined the Theoretical Physics Division at AERE Harwell in 1954, succeeding Brian Flowers as Head of that Division in 1960 and becoming Director of AERE in 1968; he eventually was appointed Chairman of the United Kingdom Atomic Energy Authority in 1981.

=== CEGB ===
As a champion of nuclear power, he was appointed, in 1983, to be chairman of the Central Electricity Generating Board. He was also highly sceptical of fusion power, famously noting that "fusion is an idea with infinite possibility and zero chance of success."

In 1989, with the government's plan to reorganise and privatise electricity generation, the position of Chairman of the CEGB disappeared. He was made Chairman of National Power which included a large number of the coal- and oil-fired power stations and all of the nuclear power stations. National Power was a division of the CEGB until it was privatised in 1990. This was done as he had a close association with nuclear power, from the early years. But before the privatisation process was complete, the city was not happy with the nuclear component in National Power, and it was removed from the process and placed into another state-owned company (only to be part privatised some 5 years later). It was as a result of this political decision that he resigned his post as Chairman of National Power. Marshall then entered into several jobs in the private sector connected with the nuclear industry and died in 1996.

As a scientist, Marshall was recognised as one of the leading theoreticians in the atomic properties of matter and characterised by his penetrating analytical powers. He was elected a Fellow of the Royal Society in 1971. In 1977 he was elected a foreign member of the Royal Swedish Academy of Engineering Sciences.

In 1981 he chaired a Task Force, set up with representatives from major interested parties to evaluate the basis for the Sizewell B Design of nuclear power station.

== Personal life ==
In 1955 he married Ann Sheppard in Cardiff and had a son and daughter.

Appointed a Commander of the Order of the British Empire (CBE) in 1973, he was Knighted in the 1982 Birthday Honours.

For his success in keeping the country's “lights on” during the protracted miners’ strike of 1984–5, Margaret Thatcher rewarded him with a life peerage and he became Baron Marshall of Goring, of South Stoke in the County of Oxfordshire on 22 July 1985.

Business positions
Preceded by Glyn England	Chairman of the Central Electricity Generating Board; 1982–1989	Succeeded by Gil Blackman
Preceded by New Post	Chairman of the World Association of Nuclear Operators; 1989–1993	Succeeded by
