= William Allan =

William Allan may refer to:

== Politicians ==
- William Allan (banker) (c. 1770–1853), Canadian banker, businessman and politician
- William Allan (English politician) (1837–1903), Liberal Party politician in the United Kingdom
- William Allan (Queensland politician) (1840–1901), pastoralist and politician in Queensland, Australia

== Sportspeople ==
- William Allan (footballer, born 1880) (1880–1965), Scottish goalkeeper for Falkirk, Rangers and Hibernian
- William Allan (footballer, born 1904) (1904–1969), Scottish defender for Hamilton and Motherwell
- Willie Allan (1942–2026), Scottish footballer
- Willie Allan (racing driver) (1930–2019), American dirt modified racing driver
- Bill Allan (1870–1948), Scottish footballer

== Others ==
- William Allan (British Army officer) (1832–1918)
- William Allan (classicist) (born 1970), Scottish classicist
- William Allan (geneticist) (1881–1943), American physician and geneticist
- William Allan (painter) (1782–1850), Scottish historical painter
- William Allan (trade unionist) (1813–1874), British trade unionist
- William Evan Allan (1899–2005), Australian military figure, seeing service in WWI and WWII
- William Allan of Glen (1788–1868), Lord Provost of Edinburgh

== See also ==
- Bill Allen (disambiguation)
- Will Allen (disambiguation)
- William Allen (disambiguation)
- William FitzAlan, Lord of Oswestry (c. 1105–1160), Norman noble
- William Van Alen (1883–1954), American architect
- Norman Allan (Norman Thomas William Allan, known as Bill), former Australian (N.S.W.) police commissioner
- George William Allan (1822–1901), Canadian politician
- George William Allan (Manitoba politician) (1860–1940), Canadian politician
