= Great Yarmouth Power Station =

Gas power station in Norfolk, England

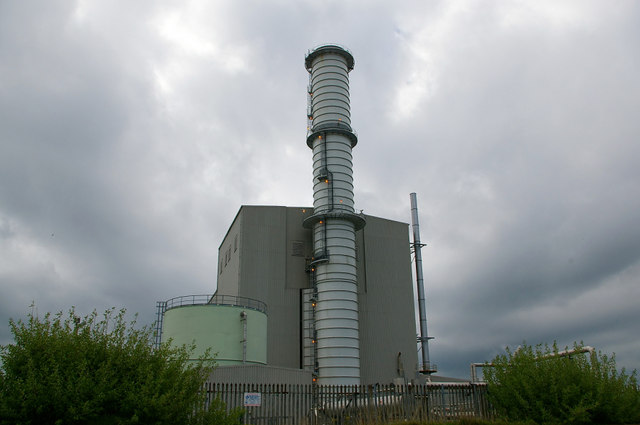
- Great Yarmouth power station in May 2007
- Country: England
- Location: Norfolk, East of England
- Coordinates: 52.583884°N 1.733255°E
- Status: Coal-fired: demolished, oil-fired: demolished, CCGT: operational
- Commission date: Coal: 1894, Oil: 1957, C: 2001
- Decommission date: Coal: 1961, Oil: 1986
- Construction cost: CCGT £185 million
- Owner: CEGB (1958–90)
- Operator: RWE Generation UK

Thermal power station
- Primary fuel: Coal, oil, Natural gas
- Chimneys: Coal: 1, oil: 1, CCGT: 1
- Cooling towers: None
- Cooling source: Seawater
- Combined cycle?: Yes

Power generation
- Units operational: Oil: 1 × 60 MW & 3 × 64 MW, CCGT: 420 MW
- Make and model: CCGT: 265MWe General Electric Frame 9 (9001FA+E) gas turbine
- Units decommissioned: All coal and oil
- Nameplate capacity: Coal: 252 MW, CCGT: 420 MW
- Annual net output: Oil station see text

External links
- Commons: Related media on Commons

Great Yarmouth Power Station is combined cycle gas turbine power station on South Denes Road in Great Yarmouth in Norfolk, England, with a maximum output of 420 MW electricity, opened in 2001. It is built on the site of an oil-fired power station, built in 1958 and closed and demolished in the 1990s. A coal-fired power station was built in Great Yarmouth in 1894 and operated until 1961. The station is operated by RWE Generation UK.

== History ==
Great Yarmouth's first power station which used coal was built in 1894 and demolished in 1961 together with its iconic large chimney.

In 1923, the AC plant comprised three 75 kW, three 150 kW and two 300 kW reciprocating engines and generators, and 1 × 600 kW and 2 × 1,500 kW turbo-alternators. The DC plant comprised two 200 kW and one 400 kW reciprocating engines and generators. The total generating capacity of the station was 4,175 kW. The total output of the boiler plant was 58,000 lb/hr (7.31 kg/s) of steam. Electricity was available as single phase AC, 83.5 Hz at 200 and 100 V and DC at 500 V. In 1923 the station generated 3.776 GWh of electricity, some of this was used in the plant, the total amount sold was 5.559 GWh. The revenue from sales of current was £48,038, this gave a surplus of revenue over expenses of £20,776. In 1926, a 3,000 kW Brush-Ljungstrém turbo alternator set was installed and all the smaller plant was removed except the two 1,500 kW machines, which were uprated to 2,000 kW. By 1959, the plant comprised one Babcock & Wilcox 108,000 pounds per hour boiler delivering steam at 260 psi (18 bar) and 750 °F (399 °C) to one 7.5 MW and one 3.75 MW Brush-Ljunstrom turbo-alternators. Condenser water was drawn from the River Yare. The electricity output in the final years was:

Great Yarmouth power station output
Year	Output GWh
1946	43.527
1953/4	10.317
1954/5	15.956
1955/6	16.349
1956/7	16.637
1957/8	5.553

Before demolition a second much larger plant, built on the South Denes, had opened in September 1958.

=== South Denes power station ===
South Denes power station was sanctioned in July 1953 as a coal fired station but in 1955 it was decided to convert to oil firing using residual oil.Initially commissioned in 1957. it had an installed capacity of 252 MW and comprised two 60 MW Metropolitan Vickers turbo-alternator and two 60 MW Richardsons Westgarth turbo-alternators. In 1972, the 60 MW machine was up-rated to 64 MW. The completed station accommodated two three drum boilers by International Combustion, Ltd., and two two-drum boilers by Mitchell Engineering, Ltd. Each has a maximum continuous evaporative capacity of 550,000 lb/hr. (69.3 kg/s) at a pressure of 900 psi (62 bar) and 482 °C (900 °F). Seawater was used for cooling. In 1961, the thermal efficiency of the station was 30.44 per cent.

Output in GWh over the period 1961–1982

This plant produced power until it was first scheduled to close in 1984 before briefly being used again during the UK miners' strike (1984–1985) (see graph) after which it again remained unused until 1994 when demolition began. On 5 May 1997, the main building and its chimney were demolished via a controlled explosion watched by thousands of people from the roads on the other side of the River Yare. The 360-foot (110 m) chimney was a landmark of Great Yarmouth, and had been the tallest structure in Norfolk.

The current gas power station plant was built on the site by Bechtel for Great Yarmouth Power Limited (a specially formed company owned by BP, Amoco and Arco) between 1998 and 2001. The project was projected to cost £185 million. The plant was operated by GE International, trading as IGE Energy Services (UK) Ltd and was then bought by RWE (trading as npower) in November 2005 for £155 million.

== Specification ==
It is a CCGT type power station that runs on natural gas supplied via a 12-inch (300 mm) diameter high pressure (69-bar) pipeline from the Bacton Gas Terminal 27 miles (43 km) to the north-west. It has one 265 MWe General Electric Frame 9 (9001FA+E) gas turbine with the exhaust gas heating a Doosan heat recovery steam generator, leading to a 150 MWe Hitachi steam turbine. At 420 MW, it generates enough electricity for around 350,000 homes. It has a thermal efficiency of 57%. The terminal voltage of the plant is 19 kV, which meets the distribution network of EDF Energy via a transformer at 132 kV. The steam condenser uses about 9 tonnes of water per second drawn from the River Yare and discharged out to sea.
