= Bill Allen (dentist) =

English dentist

William R. Allen is a former President of the British Dental Association.
