= Arthur Hawkins =

English mechanical and electrical engineer

Sir Arthur Hawkins
- Born: Arthur Ernest Hawkins; 10 June 1913; Limpley Stoke, Bath, Somerset, England
- Died: 13 January 1999 (aged 85); London, England
- Education: University of Surrey Battersea 1956
- Known for: CEGB
- Spouse: Laura Judith Tallent Draper

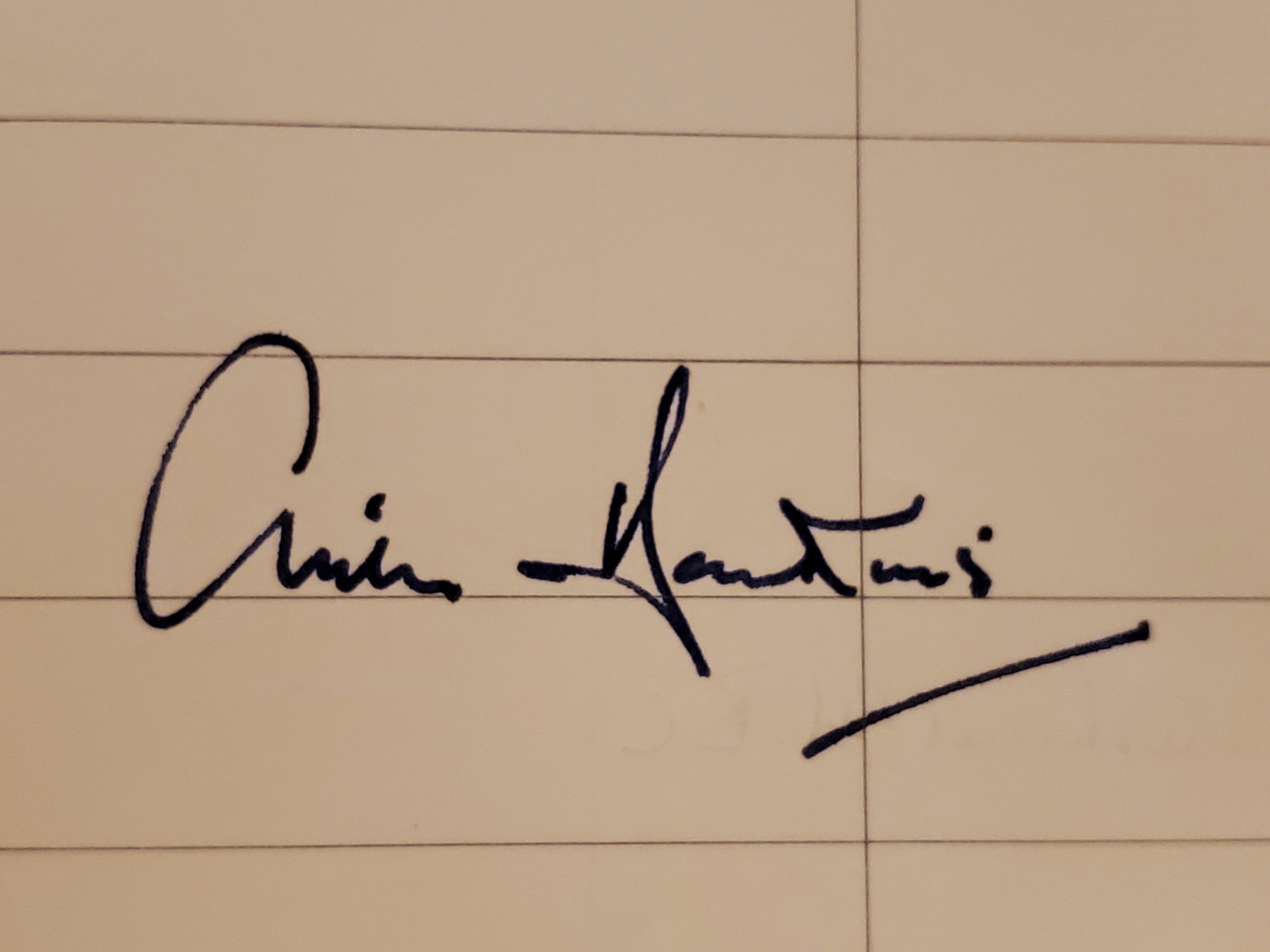
Arthur Hawkins signature 21 April 1977

Sir Arthur Ernest Hawkins OBE FIMechE FIEE (10 June 1913 – 13 January 1999) was an English mechanical and electrical engineer. Born in Lympley Stoke, Bath, Somerset and educated at the Great Yarmouth High School. He joined the CEGB and was heavily involved in the 275 kV and 400 kV Supergrid in the department of the Transmission Project Group. He married Laura Judith Tallent Draper in Marylebone Middlesex 1939. At the inception of the first 2000 MW power station West Burton in 1969 Arthur was then in charge of the CEGB Midlands Region based in Shirley, Solihull, West Midlands. He was made chairman of the CEGB in 1972 preceded by Sir Stanley Brown and proceeded by Glyn England in 1977. In June 1976 he was knighted as Chairman of the CEGB.

After retirement he served as a director with the Community of St Andrew Trust at Lincoln's Inn, London. He was survived by his son Andrew Hawkins and daughter Ruth Hawkins. Lady Hawkins died in 2020 at the age of 104.

After privatisation of the industry in 1991 commentators made the link to the lack of British energy policy to the days of the CEGB 'Oh for the glory days of Sir Arthur Hawkins and the Central Electricity Generating Board. I never thought I'd say that about an organisation that seemed, at the time, to embody the very worst aspects of post-war corporatism and central government planning. But compared with the abject chaos into which British energy policy has descended since privatisation, the absolute rule of the CEGB seems a paragon of virtue.'

Business positions
Preceded by Sir Stanley Brown	Chairman of the Central Electricity Generating Board; 1972–1977	Succeeded by Glyn England
