= William Allen (Quaker minister) =

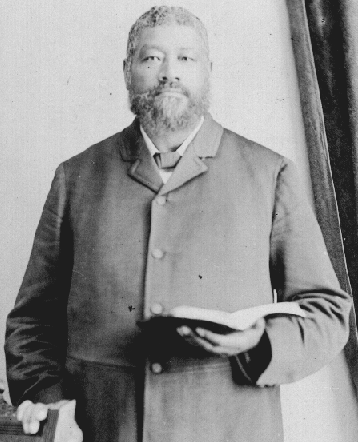
William Allen with an open Bible, 1898.

William Allen (April 2, 1821 – May 21, 1898) was an American Quaker minister, known as the only Black Quaker minister in 19th century Canada.

William pastored at Pelham Evangelical Friends Church in the town of Pelham (Fonthill) on 940 Haist road, from 1888 thru 1889, and this Pelham church still meets weekly now in 2021.

In his later years, he was a Meeting's Minister of Newmarket Friends Church until his retirement.

Allen was born in Tennessee. The son of an Irish plantation owner and a female slave, Allen was also born into slavery.

On the passing of William's master and father, his slaves were granted their freedom, a civil liberty that was concealed from them for four years to the profit of the white members of the family.

Allen later relocated from Tennessee to Indiana, a state that would later support the Union during the American Civil War and the emancipation of slaves in America.

Allen never married, dedicating his life to ministry. He was a minister in Newmarket, Ontario from 1893 to 1897.

He kept a journal, known as William Allen's Memorandum Book (1887–1891). The journal is located at the Quaker archives in Newmarket.

Allen died on May 21, 1898.

== Sources ==
- Ryon, Fred L. (1958). "William Allen, Negro Evangelist of the Society of Friends". Bulletin of Friends Historical Association. 47 (2): 94–105. ISSN 0361-1957. JSTOR 41944671.
