= HMS Flying Fox =

A ship and a shore establishment of the Royal Navy have borne the name HMS Flying Fox, after the racehorse Flying Fox.

- HMS Flying Fox was a 24-class sloop launched in 1918. She was transferred to the Royal Naval Reserve in 1920 as a drill ship, and remained in this role until sold for scrapping in 1973.
- HMS Flying Fox is the Bristol base of the Royal Naval Reserve. It was originally formed in 1924 aboard the sloop, having previously been aboard the drill ship HMS Daedalus. It closed as a Reserve unit in 1940, becoming a training centre for Mine Defence Courses until 1945. It reopened as a Reserve unit in 1946, and the name Flying Fox was allocated to the Severn Reserve in 1951. The division moved onshore in 1972, and is currently operational.
