= William Henry Allen (artist) =

British-New Zealand artist (1894–1988)

William Allen
- Born: William Henry Allen; 1894; England
- Died: 1988 (aged 93–94)
- Education: Royal College of Art
- Occupation: Artist
- Known for: art master at Nelson College; vice-president of the New Zealand Society of Artists; president of the Nelson Suter Art Society
- Notable work: co-founder, Six and Four Art Club at Dunedin School of Art, Dunedin, New Zealand

William Henry Allen (1894–1988) was a British artist and printmaker who was active in New Zealand between 1925 and the 1940s, when he returned to Britain.

Allen was born in England in 1894 and studied at the Royal College of Art in London with his friend Robert Nettleton Field. They both immigrated to Dunedin, New Zealand, as part of the La Trobe scheme in 1925. Together they formed the Six and Four Art Club at Dunedin School of Art.

Allen became art master at Nelson College in 1933, remaining there for more than 10 years, before returning to England.

Allen was an influence on other artists including Alexander Hare McLintock and Stewart Maclennan. He also served as vice-president of the New Zealand Society of Artists, and president of the Nelson Suter Art Society.
