= Stanley Brown (engineer) =

English electrical engineer

Sir Stanley Brown
- Born: 9 December 1910; Birmingham, England
- Died: 17 March 1997 (aged 86); Cheltenham, Gloucestershire, England
- Education: University of Birmingham
- Known for: CEGB
- Awards: Kt CBE

Sir Frederick Herbert Stanley Brown CBE FIMechE FIEE (9 December 1910 – 1997) was an English mechanical and electrical engineer. Born in Birmingham and educated at the King Edward's School, Birmingham he then went on to the University of Birmingham where he graduated with a first class honours degree in electrical engineering in 1932. In 1937 he was involved in the design and development of Hams Hall B power station. He joined the CEGB in 1958 upon its inception and in September 1959 he was appointed deputy chairman. On 1 January 1965, he succeeded Christopher Hinton as chairman of the CEGB and was followed by Sir Arthur Hawkins in 1972. In the 1967 Birthday Honours, he received his knighthood for services to the electricity supply industry.

Professional and academic associations
Preceded by John Ashworth Ratcliffe CB CBE FEng FRS	President of the Institution of Electrical Engineers; 1967	Succeeded by Professor John Millar Meek CBE FEng
Business positions
Preceded by Christopher Hinton, Baron Hinton of Bankside	Chairman of the Central Electricity Generating Board; 1965–1972	Succeeded by Sir Arthur Hawkins
