= William H. Allen (politician) =

American politician (c. 1851-?)

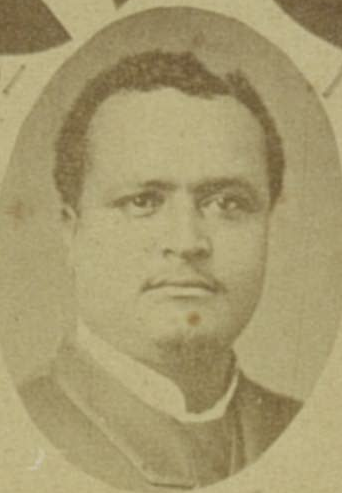

William H. Allen (c. 1851 – ?) was an American farmer, magistrate, and state legislator in Mississippi. He served in the Mississippi House of Representatives from 1884 to 1887. He was born in Jackson, Mississippi. He was a Methodist. He was a Republican.

== See also ==
- African American officeholders from the end of the Civil War until before 1900
