= William Henry Allen (engineer) =

British Engineer

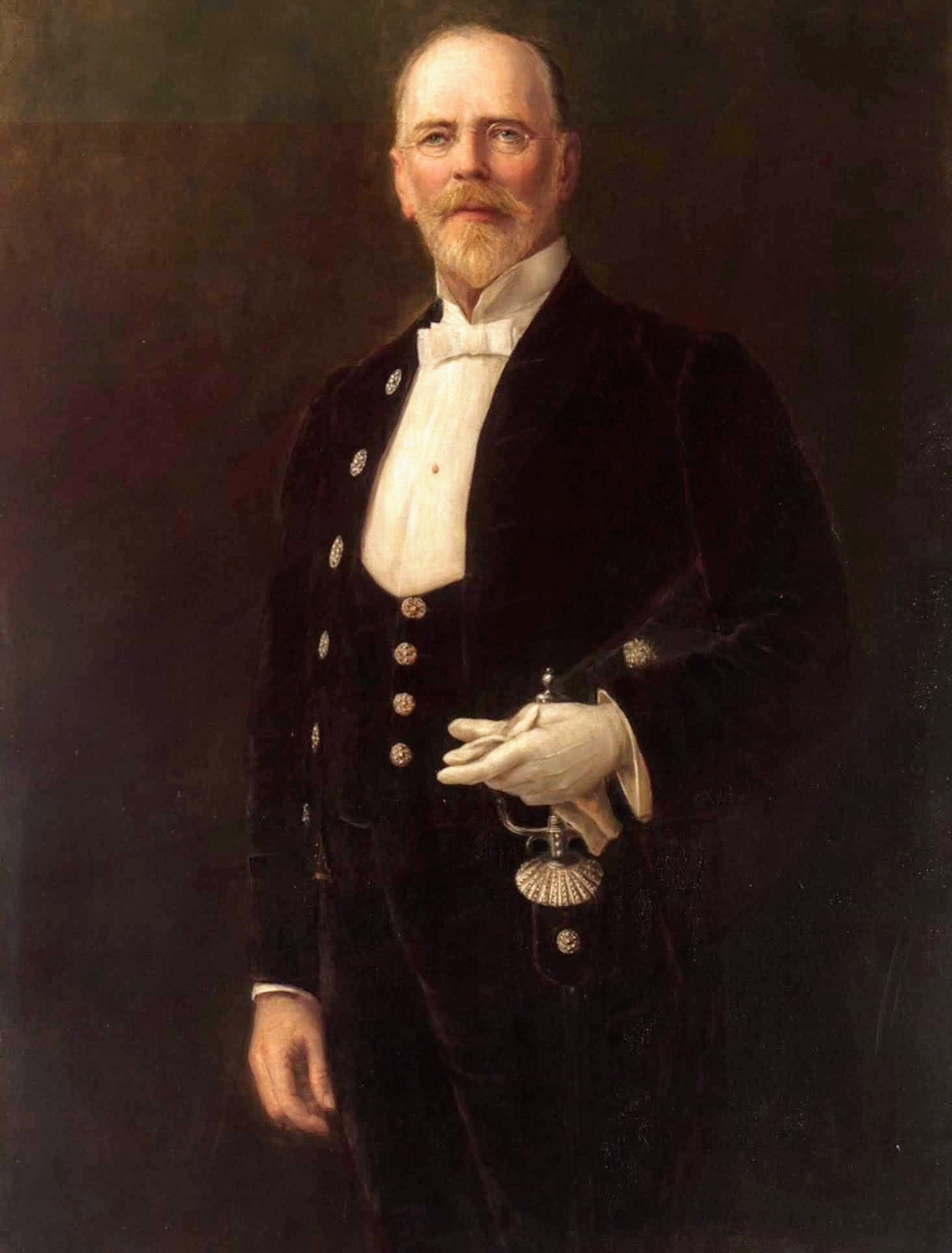
William Henry Allen Portrait by C H Parker 1905

William Henry Allen (c. 1844 to 3 September 1926) was the founder of the company W. H. Allen, Sons & Company Ltd.

He was educated at Weston-Super-Mare and at Christ College, Brecon.

He served an apprenticeship with Richard Neville and Company at their Wern Foundry in Carmarthenshire, who specialized in large colliery machinery and winding gear at its Llanelli works.

During his years in Llanelli he became a proficient organist, playing regularly in the little local church. It was there that he fell in love and eventually married a local girl, Ann Pemberton Howell (1847–86) from the nearby village of Felinfoel. The marriage took place in June 1865 and their first born son, Richard William, later Sir Richard Allen, was born in Cardiff in 1867.

It was in his native city of Cardiff that he managed his first foundry, but although scarcely twenty-one years of age, his ambitions were soon dissatisfied and in 1869 he became general manager at the Essex Street works of Messrs. James Gwynne and Co.

His originality meant he wanted complete independence, and after eleven years he established the great firm associated with his name, in York Street, Lambeth, adjoining the London and South-Western Railway. Originally called W. H. Allen & Company, here he was successful in developing a distinctive high-speed steam engine and centrifugal pump, and in 1883, in conjunction with Dr. Gisbert Kapp, designed the first direct-coupled high-speed engine and dynamo set. The latter, after being fitted experimentally in the old twin-screw battleship HMS Devastation, initiated a long series of auxiliary power sets that gained the high esteem of the naval and mercantile marine authorities.

The company made rapid progress but the York Street site had limited space to expand the works. The railway company was eager to buy the land and so Allen decided to move his business to Bedford. In 1894 he established the Queen's Engineering Works on a site immediately west of the Midland Railway line in Queen's Park, an area named in commemoration of the 1887 Golden Jubilee of Queen Victoria. In making this fresh start he took into consideration the educational needs of his employees and their children. On their behalf, also, he set up organizations which anticipated the Workmen's Compensation Act and the old-age pensions legislation.

Throughout all this period, Mr. W. H. Allen directed the firm's affairs as Chairman. Mr. Allen was a pioneer in the systematic training of his engineering pupils, and he was rewarded by their consistent success and their continued affection. He was a J.P. for the county of Bedford and became High Sheriff of Bedfordshire in 1904 and was also a Deputy-Lieutenant and a member of the Territorial Association.

In 1913 a visit was paid to the works at Bedford by the Members of the Institution of Mechanical Engineers, and on 27 June 1918, Messrs. Allen were honoured by a visit from His Majesty King George V. and Queen Mary.

William Henry and Anne had twelve children of which seven were sons. Three being directly involved in the W. H. Allen business, Richard William, Harold Gwynne and Rupert Stanley. A fourth son, George Pemberton (an architect) was commissioned to complete work on behalf of his father and the family firm.

Anne died in 1886 at the age of just thirty-nine at 1, Dean's Yard, Westminster and was buried at Brompton Cemetery, London.

Fifteen months after Anne's death William Henry married Madeline Agnew, daughter of William Joseph Fedden of Clifton, Bristol, and his wife Ellen, daughter of William Agnew of Bristol. The ceremony took place at Keynsham, near Bristol, on the 14th of April 1887. They had first met at the wedding of William Henry's eldest daughter, Cissie, to Frank Fedden, which took place from the Allen home, The Drewitts, Cuckfold, Sussex. Madeline was the maternal great-granddaughter of Andrew Agnew of Lucknaw Castle, Wigtownshire. William Henry and Madeline had one child, born on the 11th of June 1888, Gladys Madeline Agnew Allen.

William Henry and Madeline, however, eventually decided to part and Madeline took Gladys abroad to finish her education in Dresden and Florence and eventually lived in London where she died in 1920.

Mr. Allen became a Member of the Institute of Mechanical Engineers in 1885 and a Member of Council in 1906. He was also a Member of the Institution of Civil Engineers. In 1915 he was elected a Vice-President of the Institution of Mechanical Engineers and in 1921 a Past Vice-president, ill-health having rendered his elevation to the presidential chair impossible.

William Henry Allen died in the house he had built, Bromham House, on 3 September 1926 at the age of eighty-two. A few days later in the presence of many members of his family, his coffin was taken from the house to commence the journey to Brompton Cemetery. There he was buried beside his first wife, Annie.
