= William Howard Allen =

US naval officer (1790–1822)

William Howard Allen (July 8, 1790 – November 9, 1822) was an American naval officer. He was born in Hudson, New York in 1790 to Howard Allen and Lydia Hussey. His sister was Harriet Allen, wife of New York lawyer and U.S. attorney general Benjamin Franklin Butler.

Allen attended school at the Hudson Academy for Boys, was appointed midshipman in 1808, and became a Second Lieutenant in 1811. During the War of 1812, he served aboard USS Argus and was captured by the British on August 14, 1813, during a battle with a British sloop-of-war, where he sustained a leg injury that required amputation. Allen was interned for eighteen months in Ashburton, England.

Allen later commanded the Alligator, which was sent to the West Indies to fight pirates as part of the West Indies Squadron. He was killed in action on November 9, 1822, during a battle with pirates and was buried in Matanzas, Cuba. In 1827, Allen's remains were moved for reburial in Hudson, New York, where a monument was erected in his memory.
