= William Henry Allen =

American naval officer

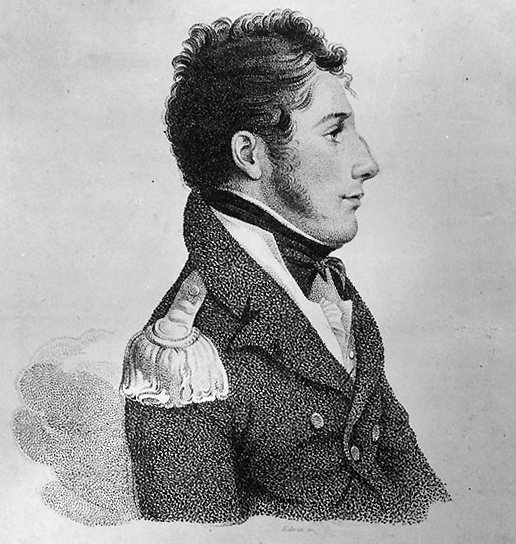
- Lieutenant William Henry Allen, USN
- Born: October 21, 1784; Providence, Rhode Island, US
- Died: August 18, 1813 (aged 28); Plymouth, England
- Military career
- Branch: United States Navy
- Service years: 1800–1813
- Rank: Master commandant
- Commands: USS Argus (1803)

Master Commandant William Henry Allen (October 21, 1784 – August 18, 1813) was a United States Navy officer who served in the War of 1812.

== Early life ==
Allen was born in Providence, Rhode Island, and was appointed a midshipman in the United States Navy on April 28, 1800. Shortly after his appointment Allen was ordered on board the frigate George Washington, commanded by captain Bainbridge. On board of USS George Washington, he sailed to Algiers. Upon returning to the United States in April 1801, he was ordered on board of USS Philadelphia, commanded by captain Samuel Barron. With USS Philadelphia, he sailed the Mediterranean Sea until June 1802. Allen sailed back to the Mediterranean again from October 1802 until December 1803 on board of USS John Adams.

In 1804 he was appointed sailing-master of USS Congress. Under the command of captain Rodgers, he sailed for the Mediterranean. In October 1805, together with captain Rogers Allen was removed to USS Constitution, and promoted to a lieutenancy. In 1806, Allen returned on board of USS Constitution to the United States. On February 17, 1807, after a short break in Providence, he was attached to USS Chesapeake, where he served in the rank third lieutenant under the command of captain Baron.

On June 21, 1807, he participated in the Chesapeake-Leopard Affair in which USS Chesapeake was boarded by the crew of HMS Leopard and four of her crew, all deserters from the Royal Navy, were seized and arrested. Allen was credited with firing the only gun discharged in her own defense by the American ship. The incident was a key development in the deterioration of Anglo-American relations which eventually resulted in the War of 1812.

In 1809, Allen was transferred to USS United States, under the command of Captain Stephen Decatur.

== War of 1812 ==
By 1812, Allen as a first lieutenant of the frigate United States took part in the engagement with HMS Macedonian. At the conclusion of that capture, he was named to command the prize crew which took Macedonian into New York. After that Lieutenant Allen took some time off from the naval service in Providence, but was called on active duty once again. On July 24, 1813, by order of Commodore Decatur he was assigned to command the brig Argus as a master commandant. William Henry Allen would conduct commerce raiding hunting British shipping.

=== Capturing the Matilda ===
William Henry Allen was ordered to raid and destroy enemy shipping thus not to take prizes unless he deplete his numbers. He broke out of New York Harbor on June 18, 1813, eluding the Royal Navy blockade. Allen arrived at Lorient in Brittany, on July 11, 1813, to raid British shipping. They captured the British schooner Matilda on July 24. Allen put a prize crew on her and sent her to France. Matilda was recaptured by a British frigate and all 11 American prize crew members were locked in prison.

== Death ==
Argus was intercepted by HMS Pelican on August 14, 1813 and captured after Allen lost a leg. Taken prisoner along with his ship and crew, Allen was brought to Plymouth, England, where he died on August 18 of his injuries. Allen was buried with full military honors in the churchyard of St Andrew's Church, Plymouth.

== Legacy ==
In 1814 a small row galley was named the USS Allen in his honor.

The destroyer USS Allen (DD-66) was also named after him. The Allen served during World War I and was present at Pearl Harbor during the attack on December 7, 1941. The Allen was the oldest destroyer in the Navy during World War II. She was assigned to training duties and spent the remainder of the war at Pearl Harbor. After the war, she was decommissioned and sold for scrap.

- Allen Street in Manhattan, New York City
- It is possible that Allens Avenue in Providence, Rhode Island, was named after him.
- Fort Allen Park in Portland, Maine, was named after him shortly after his death.

== Family ==
His father, William Allen, soon after the start of the American Revolution in June 1775, was commissioned an ensign in the 3rd Rhode Island Regiment in the Continental Army. His regiment served in the Siege of Boston and was disbanded on December 31, 1775. In January 1776, he was promoted to 1st lieutenant in the 11th Continental Infantry Regiment and served until the regiment was disbanded at the end of the year. In January 1777 he was promoted to captain in the 2nd Rhode Island Regiment. He commanded a company of the Rhode Island line of troops at the Battle of Saratoga. He transferred to the 1st Rhode Island Regiment when the two Rhode Island regiments were consolidated on January 1, 1781. William Allen was present and actively engaged in many of the battles which were fought during our Revolutionary War. In recognition of his service, he was advanced to the brevet (honorary) rank of major on September 30, 1783. He served until the Continental Army was disbanded on November 3, 1783. In 1786, Allen was appointed by Congress, senior officer of the legionary corps raised in Rhode Island. In 1799, he was appointed by the Rhode Island General Assembly a brigadier general of militia.

The mother of William Henry Allen, was the sister of William Jones, who served as Governor of Rhode Island.
