= Megawatt Valley =

Location with many electric generating stations

Coordinates: 53.0°N 1.0°W

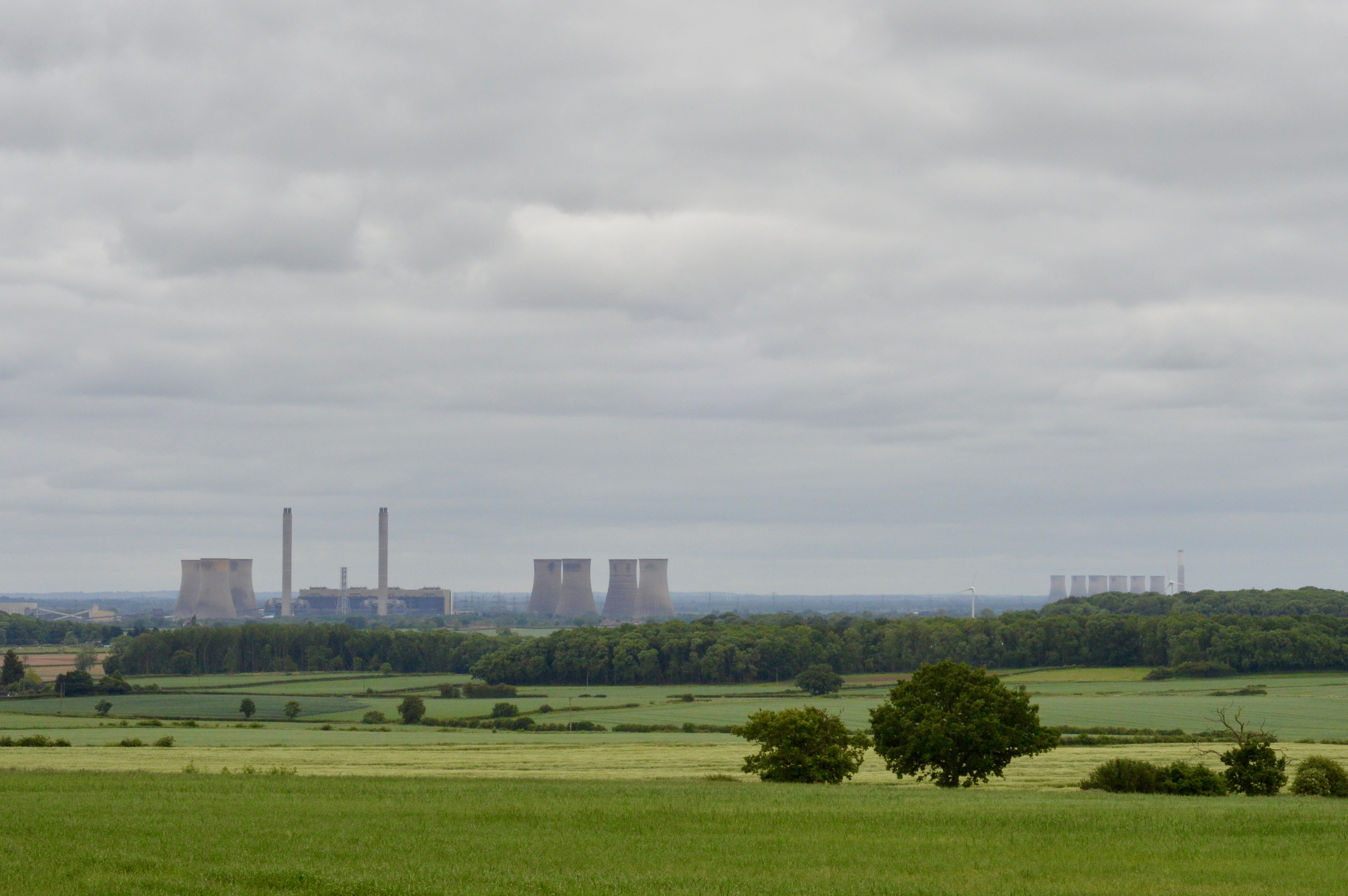
West Burton (left) and Cottam (right) power stations seen from Gringley on the Hill.

Megawatt Valley is a term applied to a geographic location which houses a large number of electricity generating stations. Historically in the United Kingdom this applied to the coal-fired power stations of the lower Trent Valley. In the mid-1980s, the valley's 13 facilities generated up to a quarter of the power demand for England and Wales. A shift to gas-fired power stations saw many of the Megawatt Valley facilities close down. The term was then associated with an area of Yorkshire centred on the River Aire that was home to Ferrybridge C, Eggborough and Drax power stations. Of these facilities Drax and Ferrybridge Multifuel remain in operation.

== Trent Valley ==
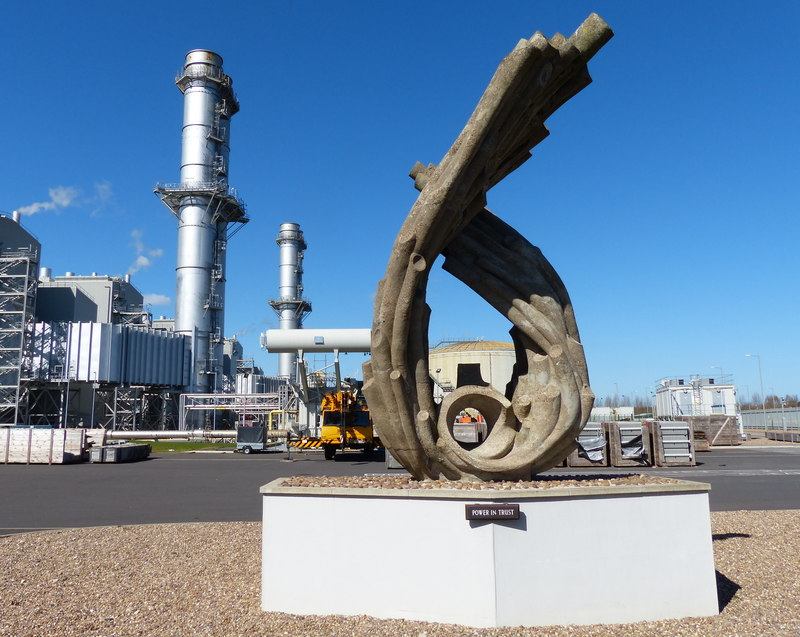
Power in Trust sculpture at Staythorpe Power Station

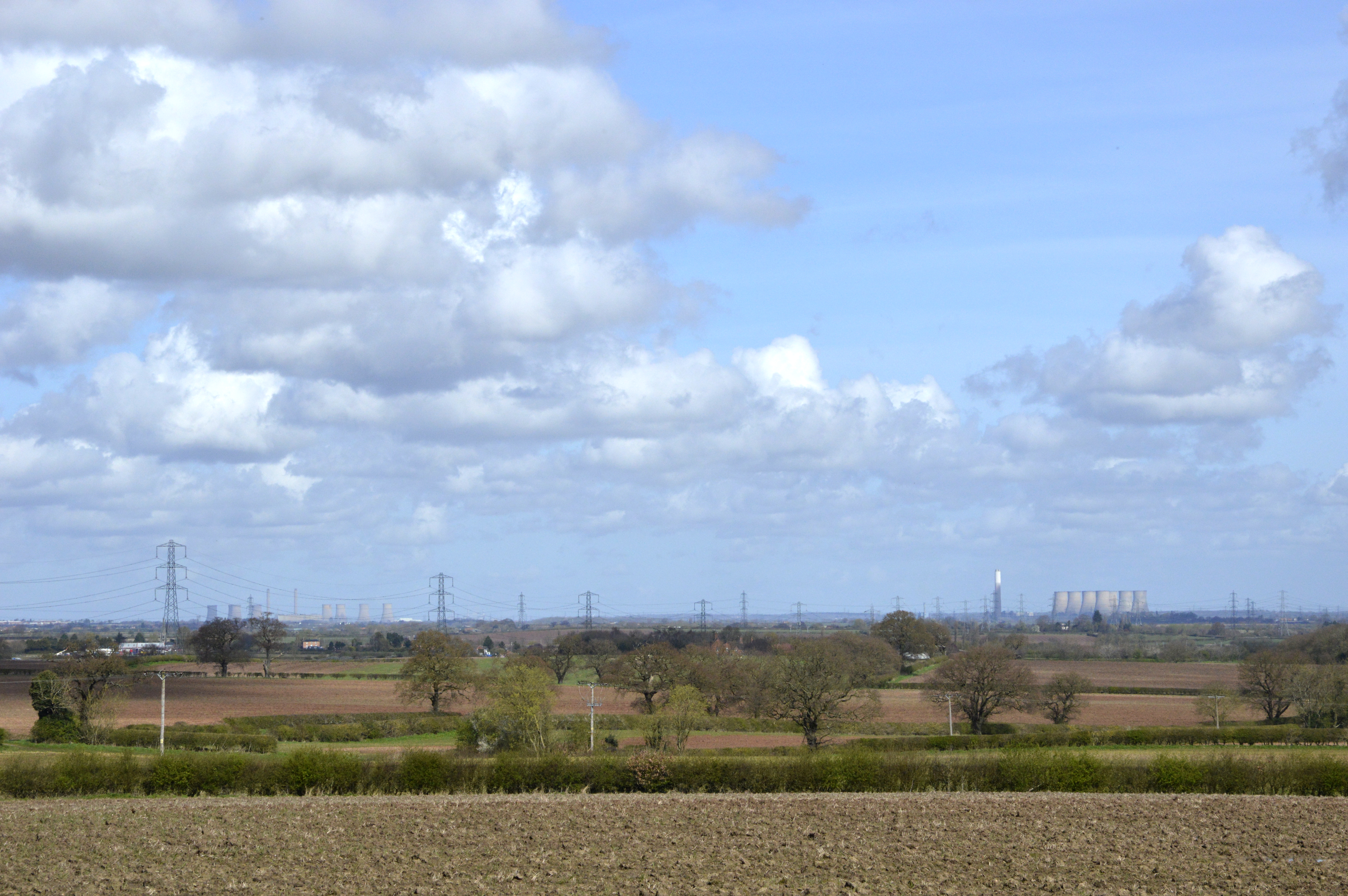
West Burton and Cottam Power Stations viewed from Ossington

Megawatt Valley was a term originally applied to the Trent Valley. The area was developed in the 1960s by the nationalised Central Electricity Generating Board (CEGB). Many coal power stations were constructed on or near the banks of the River Trent and a major overhead power line network was constructed to supply Southern England. This construction coincided with a move by CEGB to shift the location of power generation from smaller city-based power stations to rural locations. These were more efficient as they could be larger, closer to fuel sources and cooling water supplies. The Trent Valley was ideal due its proximity to the Nottinghamshire and Yorkshire coal fields and ready supply of water from the Trent.

Power stations in Megawatt Valley included High Marnham in Nottinghamshire which, at 1000 MW, was the largest power station in Europe when it was opened in October 1962, and was fed by 17 different collieries. In 1986 the valley was home to 13 of the 78 power stations in England and Wales and was responsible for up to a quarter of all electricity generated. This was the largest concentration of power generation in Europe. It was said that by the late 1960s the waters of the Trent were noticeably warmer than those of comparable rivers owing to heat transfer from the cooling water.

The sculpture Power in Trust by Norman Sillman, made to represent a hand made from boiler pipes and a turbine, was commissioned in 1961 for the opening of Staythorpe B Power Station. It remains on the site of the former coal-fired power station and has been described as a monument to the pioneers of Megawatt Valley. The five surviving cooling towers at the long-closed Willington Power Station were preserved from demolition due to the presence of nesting birds. They remain a notable landmark to travellers along the Trent and have been cited as a monument to the importance of the Trent to Megawatt Valley.

A 1989 paper written by the Chairman of East Midlands Electricity, then on the brink of privatisation, stated that until that point British electricity generation had relied on large-scale coal plant as seen at Megawatt Valley. He provided a vision of the future where generation moved away from coal to cheaper means, such as gas. This switch was made from the 1990s onwards, during the so-called Dash for Gas, and led to the closure of many coal-fired plants, including those in Megawatt Valley. Ratcliffe-on-Soar was the last of the coal-fired stations of Megawatt valley, closing in 2024. These plants had flue-gas desulphurisation units which supplied gypsum for plasterboard manufacture. The pulverised fly ash (PFA) generated by the power stations was, until the 1980s, used to fill the majority of sand and gravel workings in the Trent Valley. This practice reduced following the wider use of fly ash in manufacture and the closure of Megawatt Valley power stations. The grid connections available at some disused power station sites in the Megawatt Valley have made them attractive as locations for solar farms and battery energy storage systems.

=== List of coal power stations in the lower Trent Valley ===
Former Trent Valley power stations
Former Yorkshire power stations
Current Yorkshire power station
Cities

Richard Stone, in his book The River Trent (2005), provides the limits of Megawatt Valley as Meaford – near Stone, Staffordshire – at the upstream end and Keadby – near Scunthorpe, Lincolnshire at the downstream end. This includes the following coal-fired power stations – some of these sites have had gas-fired units installed, these are not listed.

==== Staffordshire ====
- Meaford A (1948–1974)
- Meaford B (1957–1990)
- Rugeley A (1961–1995)
- Rugeley B (1970–2016)
- Burton upon Trent (1894–1976)

==== Derbyshire ====
- Drakelow A (1955–1984)
- Drakelow B (1960–1993)
- Drakelow C (1964–2003)
- Willington A (1957–1994)
- Willington B (1960–1999)

==== Leicestershire ====
- Castle Donington (1958–1995)

==== Nottinghamshire ====
- Ratcliffe-on-Soar (1968–2024)
- Wilford (1925–1981)
- Staythorpe A (1950–1983)
- Staythorpe B (1962–1994)
- High Marnham (1962–2003)
- Cottam (1968–2019)
- West Burton (1966–2023)

==== Lincolnshire ====
- Keadby (1952–1984)

Upstream of Richard Stone's geographical limit at Meaford was the 31 MW Stoke-on-Trent power station (1913–1960s), located adjacent to the river Trent.

== Cooling water abstraction ==
With a series of power stations each abstracting cooling water and returning warm water to the river the impact on the ecology of the Trent could be significant. At Castle Donington Power Station, the average increase in river temperatures was 7°C (maximum temperature increase 12 °C, minimum 4 °C). Cooling towers were used to dissipate the heat load and reduced the reliance on river water. The table illustrates the cooling water requirements of some of the Trent Valley power stations.

Trent Valley power stations: generating capacity and cooling requirements
Power station	Generating capacity, MW	Water abstracted		Number of cooling towers	Distance to next downstream power station, km
Power station	Generating capacity, MW	mgph	m^{3}/sec	Number of cooling towers	Distance to next downstream power station, km
Stoke-on-Trent	27			7 (wood) (total 1.783 mgph)	10.5
Meaford A, B	120 + 240	15.05	19	2 (each 2.8 mgph) + 3 (each 3.15 mgph)	26.0
Rugeley A, B	600 + 480	18	22.74	4 + 1 (3.6 mgph Heller dry tower)	20.0
Drakelow A, B, C	244 + 480 + 1,268	8	10.11	1 + 3	12.9
Willington A, B	416 + 400	16.5	20.83	2 + 3	12.9
Castle Donington	627	25	31.58	4	14.9
Ratcliffe-on-Soar	2,000	1.53	1.93	8	6.0
Wilford (Nottingham)	308	10	12.63	None	33.8
Staythorpe A, B	360 + 360	23	29.05	1	20.0
High Marnham	1,000	27	34.11	5	9
Cottam	1,597	1.04	1.32	8	10
West Burton	2,000	2.4	3.03	8	28
Keadby	336	9.02	11.4	None	—

Notes

- mgph = million imperial gallons per hour.
- Below Cromwell Lock and weir the River Trent is tidal. High Marnham, Cottam, West Burton and Keadby power stations abstracted brackish and seawater from the tidal river.
- Ratcliffe-on-Soar, Cottam and West Burton only abstracted make-up water to their cooling systems, to compensate for water lost as vapour from the cooling towers, and for blowdown to prevent build up of impurities. A 1,000 MW station requires about 44.4 m^{3}/s of cooling water for a non-recirculating system, or 0.56 m^{3}/s of make-up water for a recirculating cooling tower system.
- For context, the average flowrate of the Trent at Newark (just downstream of Staythorpe) is 70 mgph (88.4 m^{3}/s) and the minimum flow is 10 mgph (12.63 m^{3}/s).

== Later use of the term ==
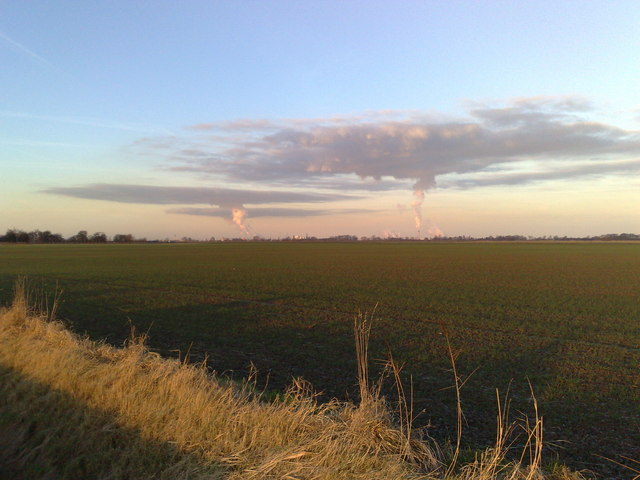
Ferrybridge, Eggborough and Drax power stations visible on the horizon

After many of the Trent Valley power stations closed, the epithet Megawatt Valley was used for a section of Yorkshire between Leeds, York and Doncaster. This was due to the presence of Ferrybridge C (1966–2016), Eggborough (1967–2018) and Drax (1974–) coal-fired power stations. This was one of the few remaining concentrations of coal-fired generation in the UK; the power stations being located close to historic coal-mining sites on the South Yorkshire Coalfield and to the River Aire. Drax is a large power station capable of generating 7% of UK electricity demand and, despite being the UK's cleanest and most-efficient coal-fired power station before it was converted to biomass, was Europe's biggest single source of carbon dioxide emissions. The term Megawatt Valley, in relation to the Yorkshire power stations, has been mentioned ("What ever happened to The Megawatt Valley? It pumped out the sounds to the avenues and alleys") in the song Two Lane Texaco by the folk band My Darling Clementine.
