= Burton upon Trent power station =

Former coal-fired power station

- Country: England
- Location: Burton upon Trent Staffordshire
- Coordinates: 52°48′54″N 01°37′27″W
- Status: Decommissioned and demolished
- Construction began: 1891
- Commission date: 1894
- Decommission date: 1976
- Owners: Burton upon Trent Corporation (1894–1947); British Electricity Authority (1948–1955); Central Electricity Authority (1955–1957); Central Electricity Generating Board (1958–1976)
- Operators: Burton upon Trent Corporation (1894–1947); British Electricity Authority (1948–1955); Central Electricity Authority (1955–1957); Central Electricity Generating Board (1958–1976)

Thermal power station
- Primary fuel: Coal
- Turbine technology: Steam turbines
- Cooling source: River water

Power generation
- Units operational: 1 x 6 MW, 1 x 7.5 MW, 2 x 15 MW
- Make and model: Parsons, British Thomson-Houston, Brush
- Nameplate capacity: 43.5 MW
- Annual net output: 157 GWh (1956)

Burton upon Trent power station supplied electricity to the town of Burton upon Trent and the wider area from 1894 to 1976. It was owned and operated by Burton upon Trent Corporation until the nationalisation of the British electricity supply industry in 1948. The power station was redeveloped several times: including the incorporation of new plant in the 1910s, in 1924–28 and 1941–43. The station was decommissioned in October 1976.

Not to be confused with West Burton power station which is also on the River Trent.

== History ==
In 1890 the Burton upon Trent Corporation applied for a provisional order under the Electric Lighting Acts to generate and supply electricity to the town. The Burton-upon-Trent Electric Lighting Order 1890 was granted by the Board of Trade and was confirmed by Parliament through the Electric Lighting Orders Confirmation (No. 4) Act 1890 (53 & 54 Vict. c. clxxxix). The power station was built between Wetmore Road and the River Trent (52°48′54″N 1°37′27″W) immediately north of municipal gas works. The power station first supplied electricity in March 1894.

== Equipment specification ==
The original plant at Burton upon Trent power station comprised horizontal compound engines connected by ropes to ‘Leeds and London’ dynamos. In 1898 the installed generating capacity was 240 kW, and the maximum load was 134 kW. The corporation undertaking had 104 consumers and there were 7,786 lamps on the circuits. The amount of electricity sold that year was 79,574 kWh. The revenue from the sale of electric current was £4,815 and the expenditure on generation and supply was £1,368. This gave an operating profit of £3,447 for the corporation.

=== Post-war plant ===
Following the First World War new plant was installed to meet growing demand for electricity. By 1923 the generating plant comprised:

- Coal-fired boilers generating up to 88,000 lb/h (11.09 kg/s) of steam, these supplied steam to:
- Generators
  - 1 × 400 kW reciprocating engine driving AC generator
  - 1 × 500 kW reciprocating engine driving AC generator
  - 2 × 1,250 kW steam turbo-alternators (AC)
  - 1 × 2,000 kW steam turbo-alternator (AC)
  - 1 × 3,000 kW steam turbo-alternator (AC)
  - 3 × 100 kW reciprocating engines driving DC generators.

These machines gave a total generating capacity of 8,400 kW of alternating current and 300 kW of direct current.

Coal was delivered at a railway siding at the power station, this was from a connection on the Derby to Birmingham line.

A variety of electricity supplies were available to consumers as:

- Single phase, 75 Hz AC at 100 and 200 volts
- 3-phase, 50 Hz AC, at 200 and 400 volts
- 500 volt DC for traction current. This was supplied to the Burton upon Trent Corporation tramways which operated from 1903 to 1929.

=== New plant ===
New low pressure (LP) plant was commissioned in 1924–28 and high pressure (HP) plant in 1941–43.

- Boilers:
  - 8 × Babcock & Wilcox CTM boilers with chain grate stokers,
  - 2 × Babcock & Wilcox land type boilers with chain grate stokers

The working pressures were:

- LP 200 psi and 620, 640 & 650°F (13.8 bar and 327, 338, 343°C)
- HP 375 psi and 800°F (25.86 bar and 427°C)

The boilers had a total evaporative capacity of 536,000 lb/h (67.5 kg/s), and supplied steam to:

- Turbo-alternators:
  - 1 × Parsons 6 MW turbo-alternator,
  - 1 × 7.5 MW British Thomson-Houston turbo-alternator,
  - 2 × Brush 15 MW, turbo-alternators.

The completed total installed generating capacity was 43.5 MW, with an output capacity 41 MW.

Condenser cooling water was taken from the River Trent.

The electrical switch gear was remote controlled Metro-Vickers.

== Operations ==
The operating data for the period 1921–23 is shown in the table:

Burton upon Trent power station operating data 1921–23
| Electricity Use | Units | Year | | |
| Electricity Use | Units | 1921 | 1922 | 1923 |
|---|---|---|---|---|
| Lighting and domestic use | MWh | 773 | 918 | 1,212 |
| Public lighting use | MWh | 44 | 44 | 70 |
| Traction | MWh | 650 | 665 | 670 |
| Power use | MWh | 5,664 | 6,530 | 8,675 |
| Total sold | MWh | 7,132 | 8,158 | 10,628 |
Load and connected load
| Maximum load | kW | 2,700 | 3,490 | 4,145 |
| Total connections | kW | 8,948 | 9,960 | 10,558 |
| Load factor | Per cent | 42.0 | 37.0 | 39.1 |
Financial
| Revenue from sales of current | £ | – | 81,688 | 75,916 |
| Surplus of revenue over expenses | £ | – | 36,638 | 34,194 |

The growth of demand and use of electricity is evident.

Under the terms of the Electricity (Supply) Act 1926 (16 & 17 Geo. 5. c. 51) the Central Electricity Board (CEB) was established in 1926. The CEB identified high efficiency ‘selected’ power stations that would supply electricity most effectively; Burton upon Trent was designated a selected station. The CEB also constructed the national grid (1927–33) to connect power stations within a region.

=== Operating data 1946 ===
Burton upon Trent power station operating data for 1946 is given below.

Burton upon Trent power station operating data, 1946
| Year | Load factor, per cent | Max output load, MW | Electricity supplied, GWh | Thermal efficiency, per cent |
|---|---|---|---|---|
| 1946 | 40.7 | 41,700 | 148.59 | 18.86 |

The British electricity supply industry was nationalised in 1948 under the provisions of the Electricity Act 1947 (10-11 Geo. 6 c. 54). The Burton upon Trent electricity undertaking was abolished, ownership of Burton upon Trent power station was vested in the British Electricity Authority, and subsequently the Central Electricity Authority and the Central Electricity Generating Board (CEGB). At the same time the electricity distribution and sales responsibilities of the Burton upon Trent electricity undertaking were transferred to the East Midlands Electricity Board (EMEB).

=== Operating data 1954–72 ===
Operating data for the period 1954–72 is shown in the table:

Burton upon Trent power station operating data, 1954–72
| Year | Running hours or load factor (per cent) | Max output capacity, MW | Electricity supplied, GWh | Thermal efficiency, per cent |
|---|---|---|---|---|
| 1954 | 6239 | 41 | 135.982 | 20.26 |
| 1955 | 6202 | 41 | 144.279 | 20.00 |
| 1956 | 6707 | 41 | 156.992 | 19.63 |
| 1957 | 5606 | 41 | 118.641 | 19.12 |
| 1958 | 6208 | 41 | 137.347 | 20.03 |
| 1961 | 22.8% | 41 | 81.991 | 19.78 |
| 1962 | 34.2% | 41 | 122.81 | 19.32 |
| 1963 | 20.36% | 41 | 73.13 | 19.09 |
| 1967 | 30.2 | 41 | 111.129 | 18.81 |
| 1972 | 25.3% | 28 | 62.289 | 18.70 |

The less intensive use of the plant is evident.

Output of the station in GWh

In 1958 the Burton electricity district supplied an area of 122 square miles and a population of 102,500. The amount of electricity sold and the number and types of consumers was as follows:

| Type of Consumer | No. of consumers | Electricity sold, MWh |
|---|---|---|
| Domestic | 30,250 | 44,419 |
| Commercial | 3,206 | 16,158 |
| Industrial | 331 | 107,132 |
| Farms | 714 | 4,867 |
| Public lighting | 22 | 1,359 |
| Total | 34,523 | 173,935 |

== Closure ==
Burton upon Trent power station was decommissioned on 25 October 1976. The buildings were subsequently demolished and the area has been redeveloped with industrial and commercial buildings.

== See also ==
- Timeline of the UK electricity supply industry
- List of power stations in England
- West Burton power stations
- Drakelow power station
- Willington power station
