= Ratcliffe-on-Soar Power Station =

Decommissioned coal-fired power station in Nottinghamshire, England

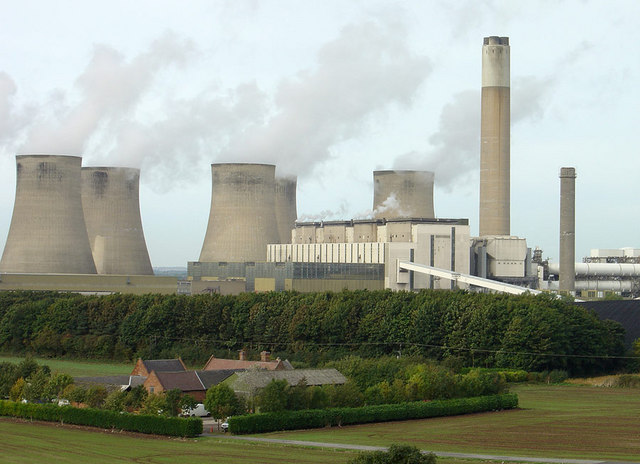
- Ratcliffe-on-Soar Power Station viewed from the east in September 2002 showing cooling towers and two chimneys
- Country: England
- Location: Nottinghamshire, East Midlands
- Coordinates: 52.865268°N 1.255°W
- Status: Decommissioned
- Construction began: 1963
- Commission date: 31 January 1968
- Decommission date: 30 September 2024
- Owner: Uniper
- Operators: Central Electricity Generating Board (1968–1990); Powergen (1990–2002); E.ON UK (2002–2015); Uniper (2015–2024)

Thermal power station
- Primary fuel: Coal
- Chimneys: 2
- Cooling towers: 8

Power generation
- Units decommissioned: 4 × 500 MW
- Nameplate capacity: 2,000 MW

External links
- Website: Uniper/Ratcliffe-on-Soar
- Commons: Related media on Commons

Ratcliffe-on-Soar Power Station is a decommissioned power station owned and operated by Uniper at Ratcliffe-on-Soar in Nottinghamshire, England. Commissioned in 1968 by the Central Electricity Generating Board (CEGB), the station had a capacity of 2,000 MW. It was the last remaining operational coal-fired power station in the UK, and closed on 30 September 2024, marking the end of coal-powered electricity generation in the United Kingdom.

The power station occupies a prominent position next to the A453 road, close to junction 24 of the M1 motorway, the River Trent and the Midland Main Line (adjacent to East Midlands Parkway railway station) and dominates the skyline for many miles around with its eight cooling towers and 199 m (653 ft) tall chimney. The first chimney is one of the tallest chimneys in England.

== Second chimney ==
The second chimney is located at the site, and it was also decommissioned during the closure of the facility.

== History ==
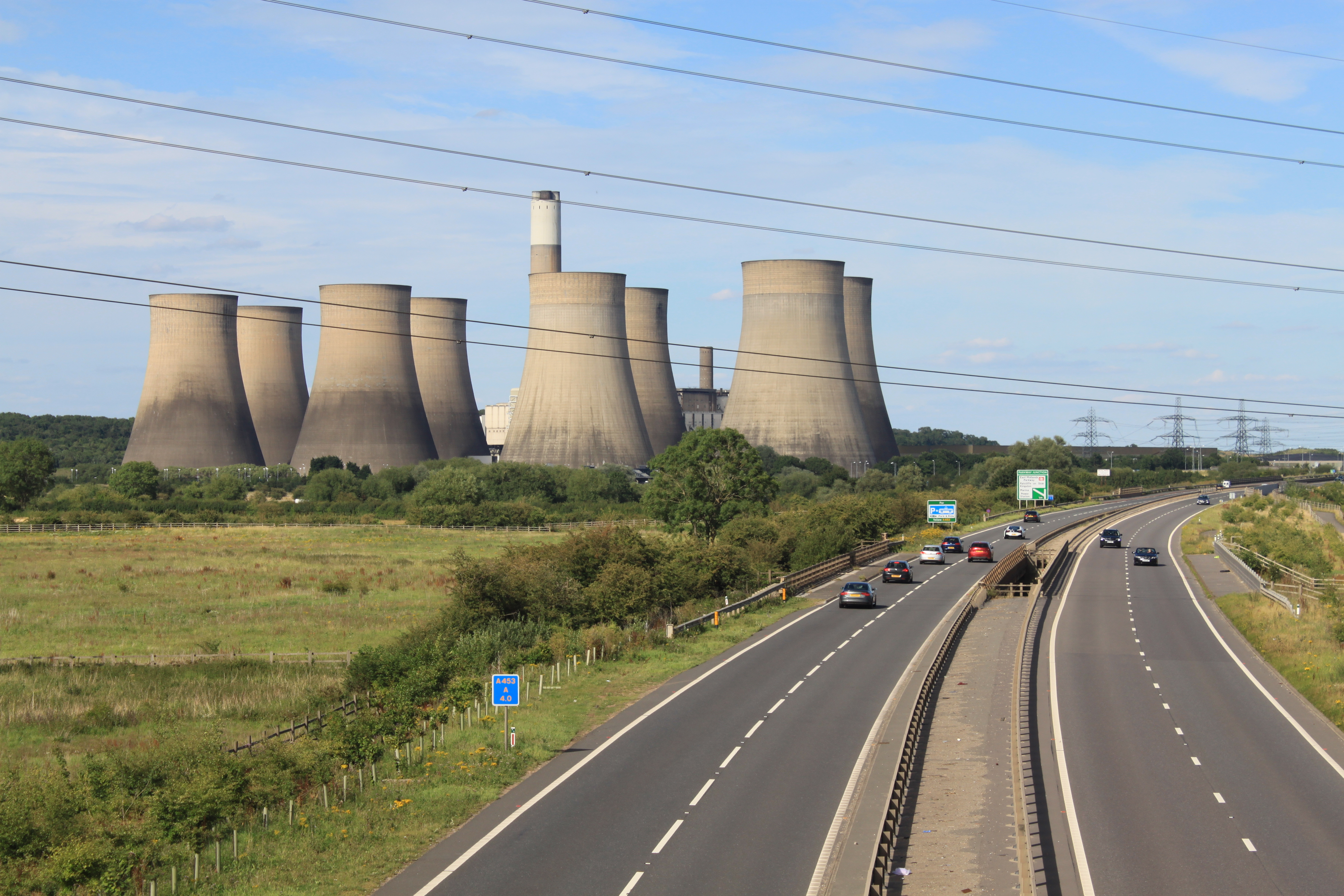
View from the south-west including the A453 (July 2020)

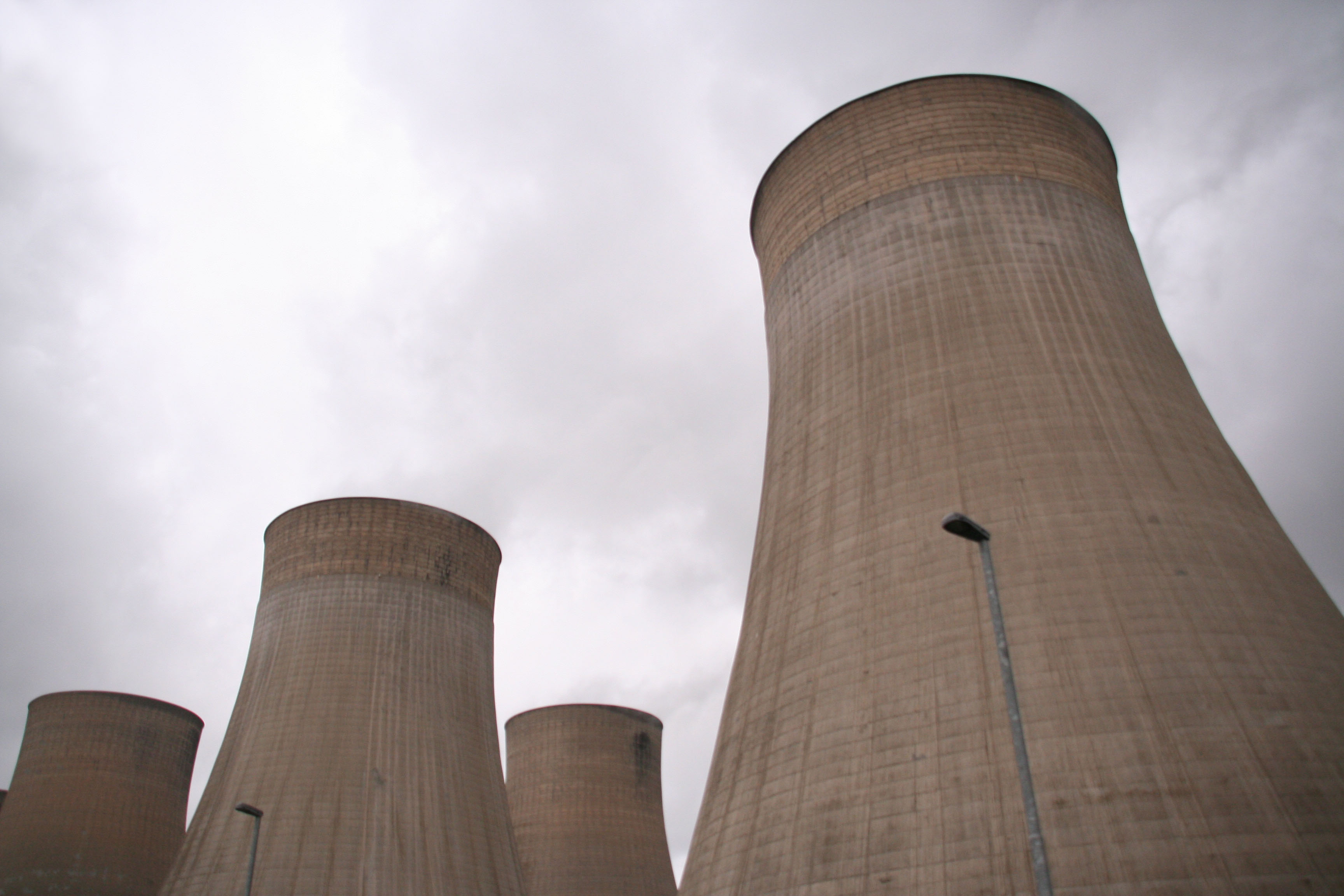
Cooling towers viewed from the East Midlands Parkway rail station platform

The public inquiry for the station's construction took place at County Hall, Nottinghamshire from 8 January 1963. It was approved by the government on 29 August 1963.

=== Construction ===
The construction of the power station began in 1963 and it was completed in 1967. The station began generating power on 31 January 1968.

The architects were Godfrey Rossant and J. W. Gebarowicz of Building Design Partnership. White cladding was used on the boiler and turbine houses and the end elevations had vertical bands of glazing to emphasise their verticality, the four concrete coal bunkers projected above the roof-line. The structural engineer was C. S. Allott.

=== Design and specification ===
The station had four units, each consisting of a coal-fired boiler made by Babcock & Wilcox driving a 500 megawatt (MW) Parsons generator set. The four boilers are rated at 435 kg/s, steam conditions were 158.58 bar at 566 °C, with reheat to 566 °C. This gave the station a total generating capacity of 2.116 GW, equivalent to the electricity demand of approximately 2 million people. There are 4 × 17.5 MW auxiliary gas turbines on the site; these were commissioned in December 1966.

Ratcliffe power station was supplied with coal and other bulk commodities by rail via a branch off the adjacent Midland Main Line (MML). Rail facilities include a north facing junction off the MML slow lines, two tracks of weighbridges, coal discharge hoppers, and a flue gas desulfurisation discharge and loading hopper. There was formerly a fly ash bunker and loading point with a south-facing connection to the MML; this was extant in 1990 but had been demolished and disconnected by 2005.

=== Electricity production ===
In 1981, the station was burning 5.5 million tonnes of coal a year, consuming 65% of the output of south Nottinghamshire's coal-mines. The last of Nottinghamshire's collieries, Thoresby Colliery, has since closed in 2015. Emissions of sulphur dioxide, which cause acid rain, were greatly reduced in 1993 when a flue gas desulphurisation system using a wet limestone-gypsum process became operational on all of the station's boilers. Emissions of oxides of nitrogen, greenhouse gases which also cause damage to the ozone layer, were reduced in 2004 when new equipment was fitted to Unit 1 by Alstom.

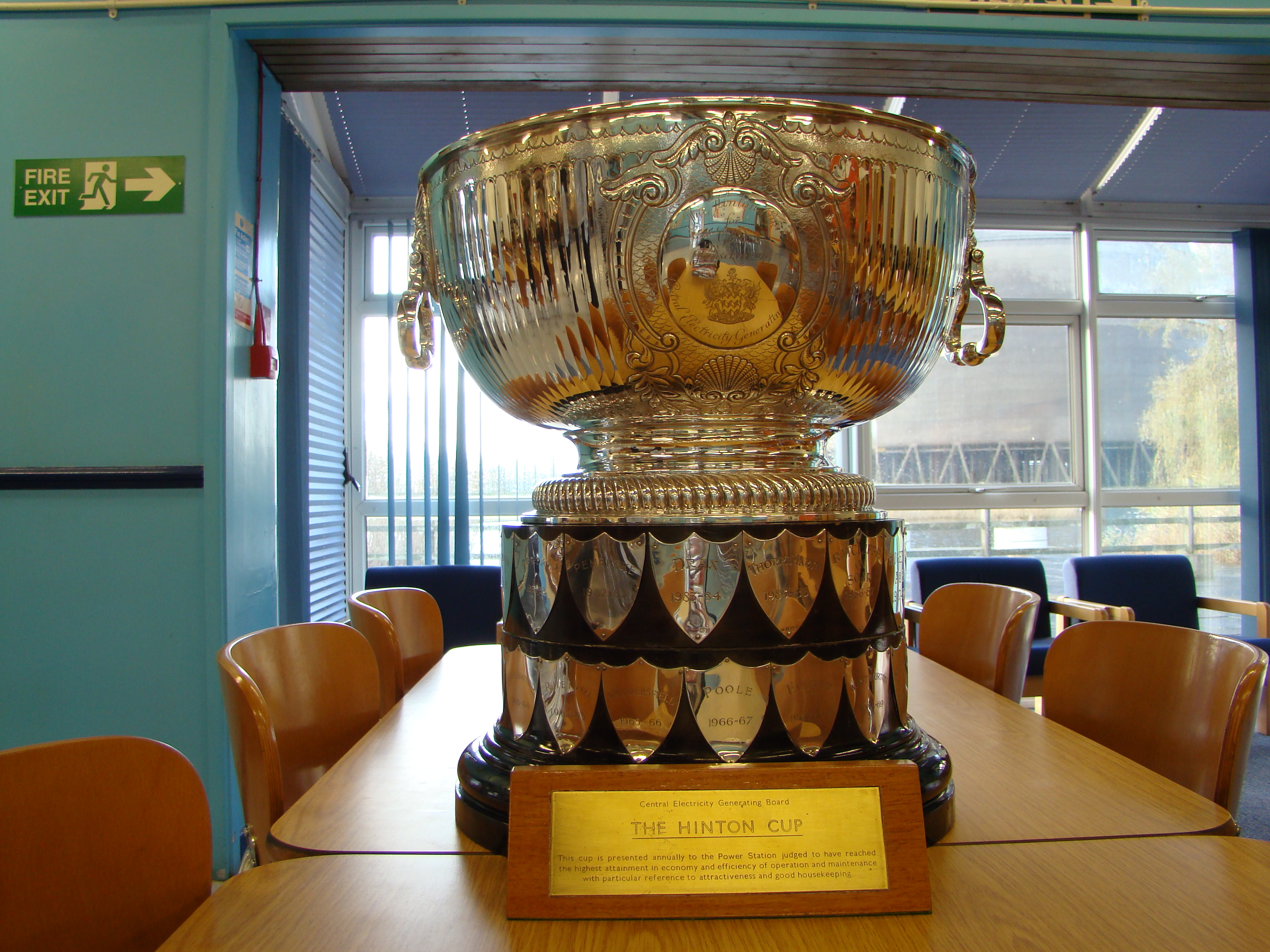
Hinton Cup

In 1975/76 and again in 1986/87 Ratcliffe was presented with the Hinton Cup, the CEGB's "good house keeping trophy". The award was commissioned by Sir Christopher Hinton, the first chairman of the CEGB. On 11 February 2009, Unit 1 became the first UK 500 MW coal-fired unit to run for 250,000 hours.

On 2 April 2009, E.ON UK announced it had installed a 68-panel solar photovoltaic array at the power station "to help heat and light the admin block, saving an estimated 6.3 tonnes of carbon dioxide per year".

Uniper has its Technology Centre at the site, where it carries out research and development on power generation.

== Environmental performance ==
In 2009, the plant emitted 8–10 million tonnes of CO_{2} annually, making it the 18th-highest CO_{2}-emitting power station in Europe.

Ratcliffe power station was compliant with the Large Combustion Plant Directive (LCPD), an EU directive that aims to reduce acidification, ground level ozone and particulate matter by controlling the emissions of sulphur dioxide, oxides of nitrogen and particles from large combustion plants. To reduce emissions of sulphur the plant was fitted with flue gas desulphurisation, and also with a Boosted Over Fire Air system to reduce the concentration of oxides of nitrogen in the flue gas.

Ratcliffe power station was the first in the United Kingdom to be fitted with selective catalytic reduction (SCR) technology, which reduces the emissions of nitrogen oxides through the injection of ammonia directly into the flue gas and passing it over a catalyst.

=== Environmental protests ===
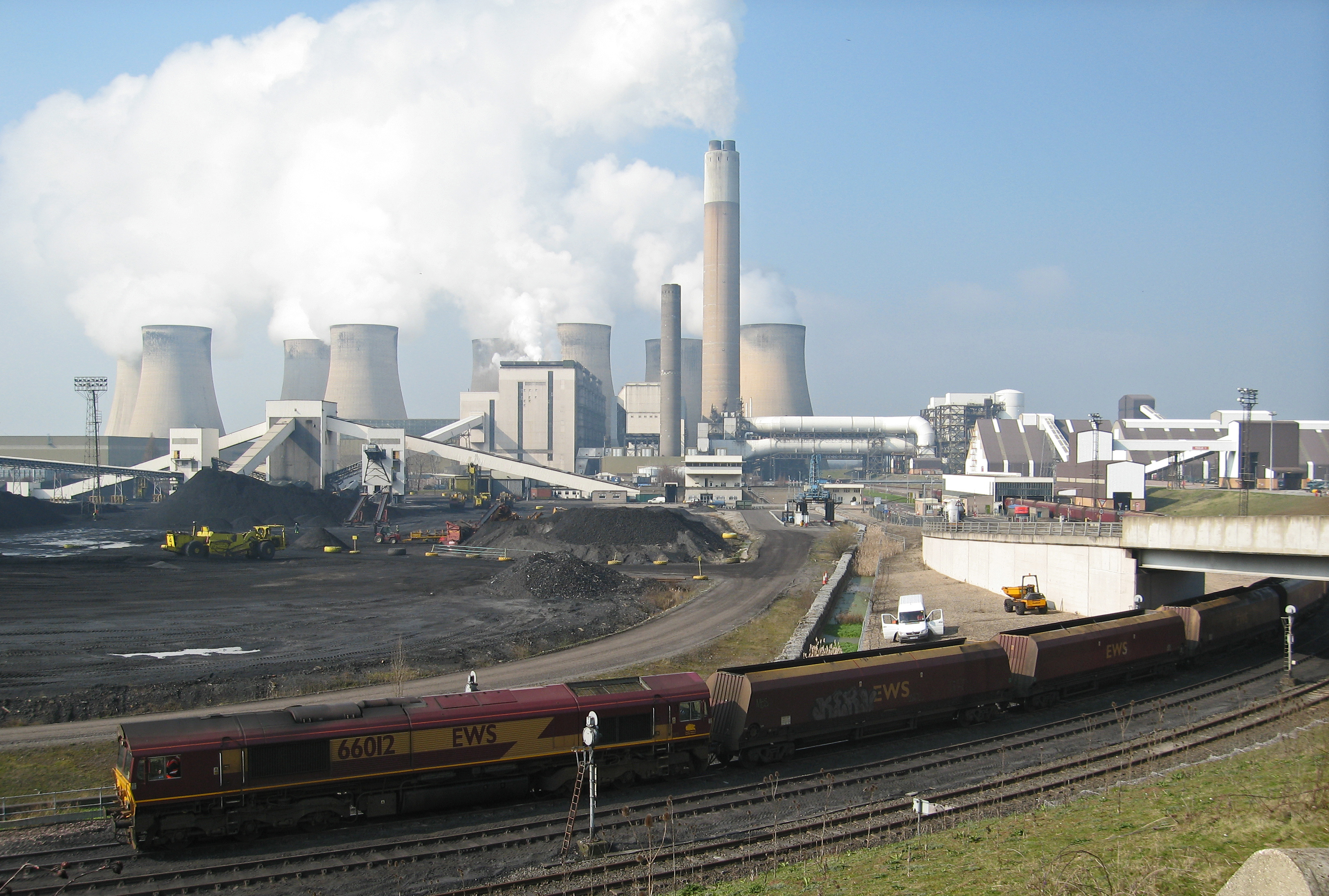
Ratcliffe-on-Soar power station, from the east, with a train of coal being unloaded as it passes at walking pace through the building at middle right

On 10 April 2007, eleven environmental activists from a group called Eastside Climate Action were arrested after they entered the power station and climbed onto equipment in order to draw attention to greenhouse gas emissions from coal-fired power stations, when E.ON UK was proposing to build more.

In 2009, the station was the intended target of protesters when, in the early hours of 14 April, police arrested 114 people at Iona School who were planning to disrupt the running of the power plant. Those arrested were not charged and soon released on bail. Later, 26 of those arrested were charged with conspiracy to commit aggravated trespass, a charge that carries a maximum six months sentence. Twenty of these activists, having admitted that they planned to break into the power station, were found guilty of conspiracy to commit aggravated trespass. When sentencing 18 of these protesters, in December 2010, the judge called them "...decent men and women..." and handed out community orders with only two having to pay reduced expenses. The charge against the six pleading not guilty was dropped when it was revealed that Mark Kennedy of the Metropolitan Police had been working as an undercover infiltrator for the National Public Order Intelligence Unit and had played a significant role in organising the action. Additionally, recordings made by Kennedy should have been made available to the Crown Prosecution Service and the defence team. Following these revelations the 20 convicted activists appealed, and their convictions have since been quashed.

Between 17 and 18 October 2009, protesters from Climate Camp, Climate Rush and Plane Stupid, took part in The Great Climate Swoop at the site. The police arrested 10 people before the protest began on suspicion of conspiracy to cause criminal damage. Some 1,000 people took part, and during the first day groups of up to several hundred people pulled down security fencing at a number of points around the plant. Fifty-six arrests were made during the protest and a number of people were injured, including a policeman, who was airlifted to hospital but later discharged.

== Closure and future ==
In June 2021, the site was listed as a possible location for the world's first nuclear fusion power plant. However, it was withdrawn from the shortlist in January 2022.

In response to the 2021 United Kingdom natural gas supplier crisis, the decommissioning of one of the station's 500-megawatt units, originally planned for September 2022, was delayed. Upon the closure of Kilroot Power Station in Northern Ireland in September 2023, it became the last coal-fired power station in the UK. In January 2024, all four of its generating units had to be run together for the final time in response to high demand from cold weather. In April 2024, one unit was placed into "preservation" mode, in advance of plant shutdown, and in June 2024, the last train of coal was delivered for burning at the power station. The station closed for power generation on 30 September 2024 at midnight, with the turbo generator de-syncing from the National Grid just after 15:00 on 30 September, ending 142 years of British coal power and precipitating a two-year decommissioning process.

The site is planned to be redeveloped, and a local development order has been established to achieve this. It's currently undergoing demolition which is expected to be completed by 2030. Uniper stated they expected demolition work to begin in late 2026, and for the main power station and turbine hall buildings to be demolished by mid-2028 at the earliest. They also said they expected for the cooling towers not to be demolished before 2029.

== See also ==
- Megawatt Valley
- Cottam power stations
- West Burton power stations

Preceded by Ferrybridge C Power Station	Largest power station in the UK; 1968–1973	Succeeded by Longannet Power Station
