= Cottam power stations =

Two power stations, the coal-fired station closed in 2019

Cottam power station
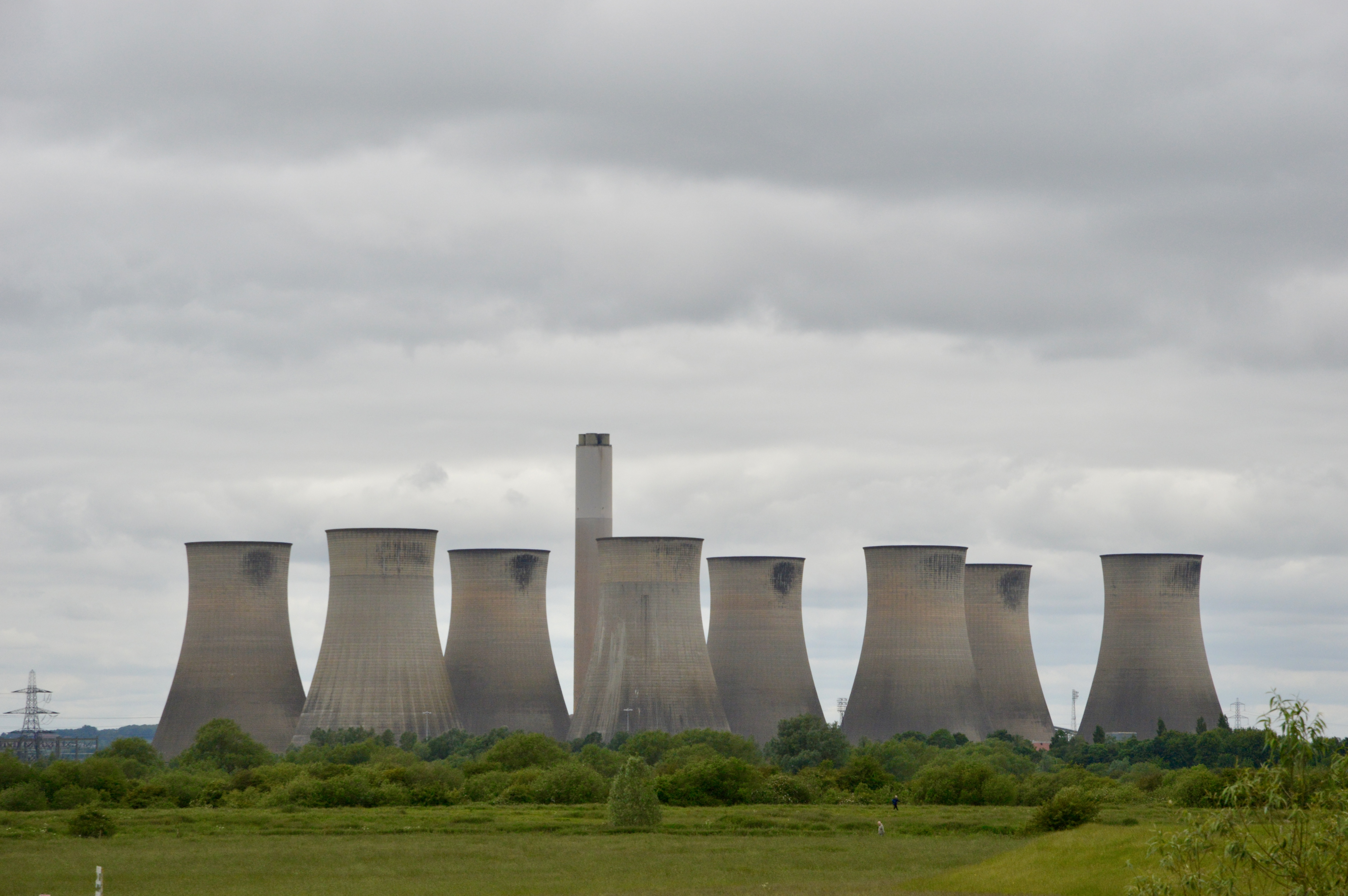
- The power station, viewed from the east. June 2024.
- Country: England
- Location: Cottam
- Coordinates: 53.304°N 0.7815°W
- Status: Decommissioned and Demolished
- Construction began: 1964
- Commission date: 1968
- Decommission date: 30 September 2019
- Operators: Central Electricity Generating Board (1968–1990); Powergen (1990–2000); EDF Energy (2000–present)

Thermal power station
- Primary fuel: Coal
- Secondary fuel: Oil
- Tertiary fuel: Biomass
- Site elevation: 7.92 m (26.0 ft)
- Chimneys: 1
- Cooling towers: 8

Power generation
- Units operational: 4
- Make and model: English Electric Co. Ltd.
- Units decommissioned: 4
- Nameplate capacity: 2,000 MW

External links
- Commons: Related media on Commons

The Cottam power stations were a pair of power stations on over 620 acres (250 ha) of mainly arable land situated at the eastern edge of Nottinghamshire on the west bank of the River Trent at Cottam near Retford. The larger coal-fired station was decommissioned by EDF Energy in 2019 in line with the UK's goal to meet its zero-coal power generation by 2025. The smaller in-use station is Cottam Development Centre, a combined cycle gas turbine plant commissioned in 1999, with a generating capacity of 440 MW. This plant is owned by Uniper.

The site is one of a number of power stations located along the Trent valley and is one of the so-called Hinton Heavies. The West Burton power stations are 3.5 miles (5.6 km) downstream and Ratcliffe-on-Soar Power Station is 52 miles (84 km) upstream. The decommissioned High Marnham Power Station was 6 miles (9.7 km) upstream. Under the Central Electricity Generating Board in 1981/82 Cottam power station was awarded the Christopher Hinton trophy in recognition of good housekeeping; the award was presented by junior Energy Minister David Mellor. After electricity privatisation in 1990, ownership moved to Powergen. In October 2000, the plant was sold to London Energy, who are part of EDF Energy, for £398 million.

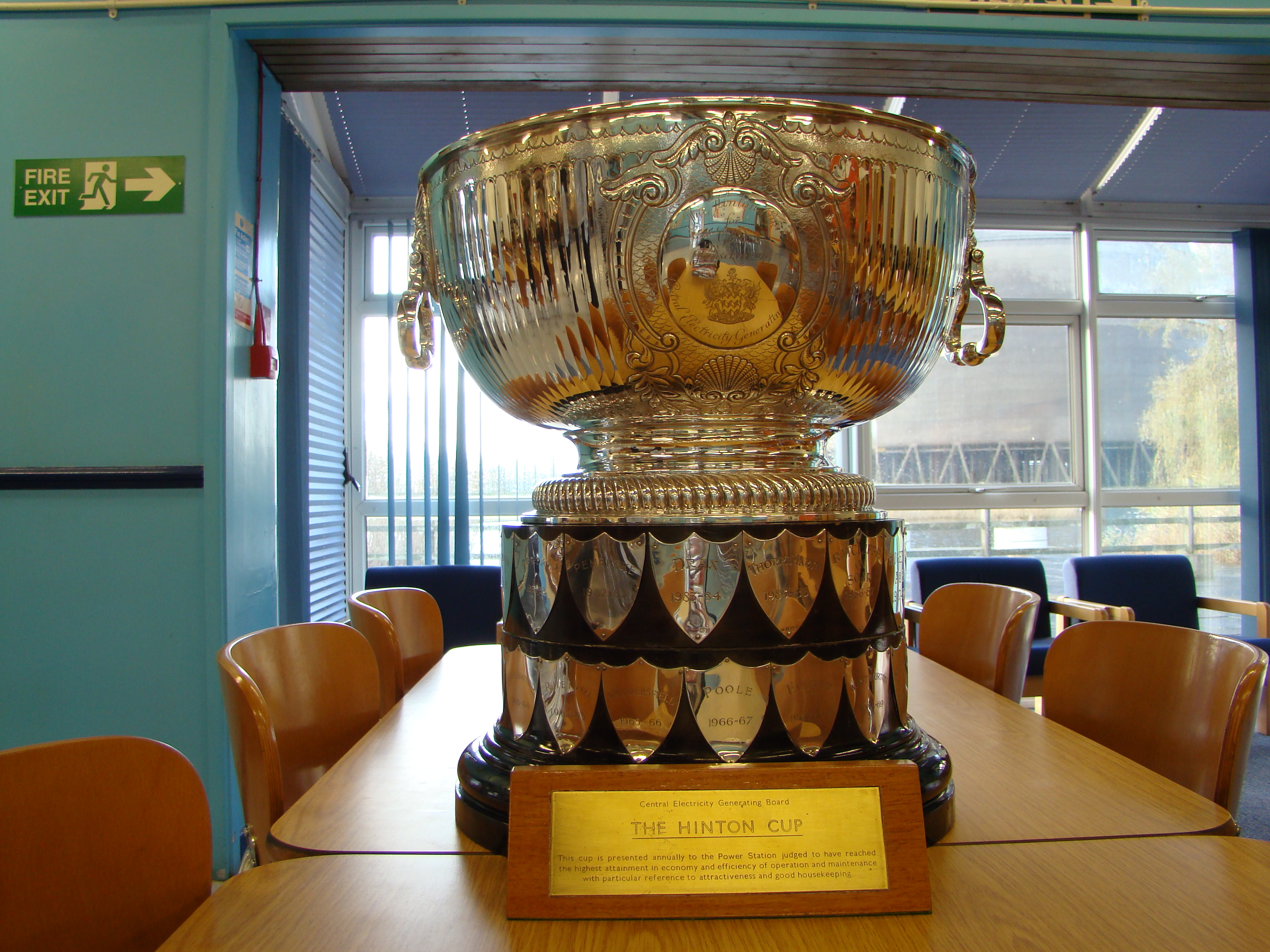
Hinton Cup

In January 2019, EDF Energy announced that the coal station was due to cease generation in September 2019 after more than 50 years of operation. The station closed as planned on 30 September 2019. Demolition of Cottam power station began in 2021, with Brown and Mason carrying out the works.

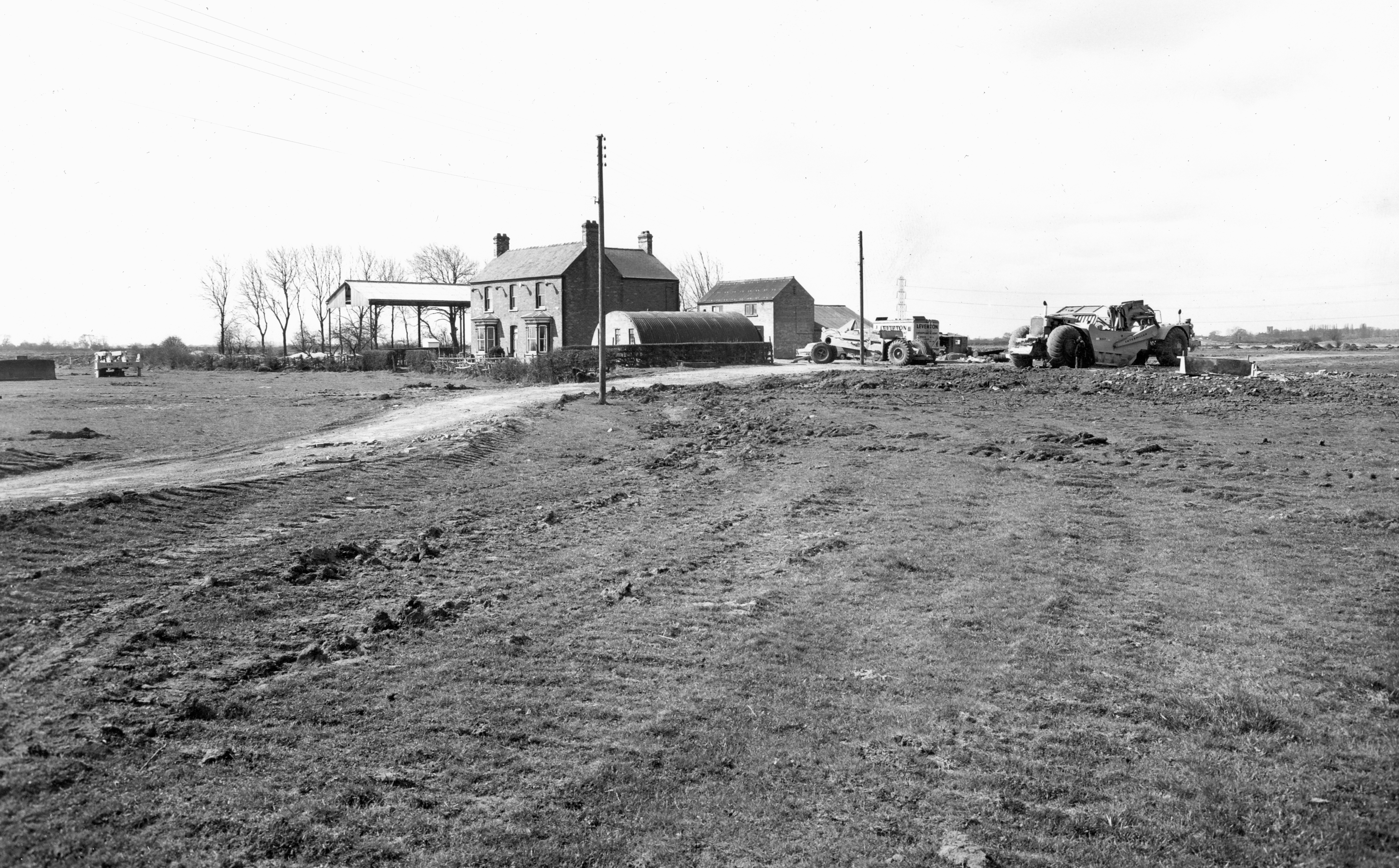
The commencement of works at Mickleholme Farm in April 1964

== Construction ==
Work was begun in April 1964 on the site of Mickleholme Farm by the Central Electricity Generating Board Midlands Project Group from Bournville. Mickleholme Farm laid between the precipitators and the cooling towers. The modernist architects for the buildings on site were the Nottingham practice of Yorke Rosenberg Mardall. Extensive use was made of 'Cottam Amber' coloured cladding around the boiler and turbine house, 'emphasising its functional grandeur at the heart of the complex'. The English architectural critic Reyner Banham dubbed the office block as 'over-wrought and made gratuitously rhetorical'.

The main contractor for the construction of the 2,000 MW power station was Balfour Beatty. The coal plant was supplied by the New Conveyor Company of Smethwick. John Thompson boilers supply steam to English Electric 500 MW steam turbines. The maximum continuous rating of each boiler is 2,400 lb/sq.in and 568 °C at the superheater. The power station opened in 1968 when owned by the Central Electricity Generating Board.

The ground level before construction varied between 3.35 m and 5.18 m (11 and 17 ft) ordnance datum (O.D.) In order to provide adequate protection against flooding, the area in which the main building is constructed was raised to 7.92m (26 ft) ordnance datum by filling from borrow pits on site, but the coal store and cooling tower area remain at the original level of 4.87m (16 ft) ordnance datum. The nature of the sub-soil was investigated by trial bores and found to be good load bearing marl at depths between 4.26m and 12.19m (14 and 40 ft) below the existing ground level and overlain by sand and gravel strata on top of which lay clay or silt and top soil.

The main building was 209.39 m (687 ft) long by 124.35 m (408 ft) wide and housed four 500 MW boiler-turbine units. The height of the boiler house was 65.22 m (214 ft) and turbine house 34.44 m (113 ft). The building was of steel construction with blockwork up to 10.66m (35 ft), above which there was a light-weight corrugated sheet cladding and windows.

By completing the pile caps on units 1 and 2, the steel erection work was able to progress, while pile caps and flooring were completed on units 3 and 4. This enabled the steel work to be erected on units 3 and 4 from finished floor level while the flooring was being completed on units 1 and 2. This reduced the time taken to construct the main building.

Within the boiler house and between boilers 2 and 3, an escalator was erected which in several stages extended to the boiler drum level to assist with the movement of men and materials.

To the north of the main building was the precipitator bay and chimney. The four flues from the boiler were contained within a single chimney which stood 190.5 m (625 ft) above ground level. In order to improve plume dispersal, the outer chimney casing was terminated 7.62 m (25 ft) short of the four flues which stood at a height of 198.12 m (650 ft).

To the east of the site of the main building are eight cooling towers which are 114.3 m (375 ft) in height and have a base diameter of 94.48 m (310 ft) overall. Beyond this are the coal plant and the coal stocking area. The 400 kV switching station is to the south of the site from which feeders join the National Grid system by way of other substations in the area. To the west are the station workshops and administration block of offices, which were connected to the turbine house by an enclosed overhead walkway. Other associated buildings such as the control block, water treatment plant house, oil storage compound etc., are disposed around and adjacent to the site of the main building.

The cladding of the main building was painted in "Cottam Amber" colour, designed to blend with the brickwork of houses and farms in the vicinity. Extensive grassing and tree planting was carried out on land around the site when construction work had finished. A 15 m high tree-clad ridge was constructed to designs by Kenneth and Patricia Booth to shield Cottam village from the visual mass and noise of the station.

== Boilers ==
The four 500 MW boilers at Cottam power station were manufactured by John Thompson Water Tube Boilers Limited, in conjunction with Clarke Chapman & Co. Ltd. Each had an evaporation rate at M.C.R. of 1.542 tonne/hour (3,400 lb/hr). The boiler plant was designed for short time overload operation. By bypassing two of the H.P. feed heaters and increasing the firing rate by 8% an increase of 5% electrical output could be obtained.

Coal was fed from the bunker to the fuel pulverising mills by variable speed drag-link feeders. The four barrel-type mills rotated at 15 rev/min and are swept by hot air which carried the pulverised fuel (P.F.) mixture to eight classifiers that rejected any unground pieces of coal back to the mill. Eight exhausters passed the P.F. to 32 turbulent P.F. burners arranged in four rows of eight burners on the boiler front. Each P.F. burner had an integral oil burner which was used for lighting up purposes and low load operation when instability with P.F. firing would be experienced. Combustion air was fed to the burners by two forced draught fans which passed warm air ducted from the top of the boiler house through two rotary regenerative air heaters to the secondary or combustion air registers around each burner. The air heaters could be bypassed on the gas and air side to facilitate optimum operating conditions.

The boiler feed water passed through the economiser before entering the drum and was then circulated around the combustion chamber water wall tubes by any three of the four boiler water circulating pumps. Steam from the drum was passed to the H.P. turbine through a horizontal primary superheater bank, pendant superheater platens, and pendant final superheater bank. The superheater platens – which were situated directly above the combustion chamber – differ from other heaters in that the heat would be imparted to the steam by radiation as well as convection. The other heaters were later in the gas duct and relied mainly on convection for heat transfer. Steam temperature control was achieved by two stages of attemperation, one of which is between the primary super heater and the superheater platens and the other, which controlled the final steam temperature, was immediately before the final superheater inlet. Exhaust steam from the H.P. turbine would be returned to the boiler for reheating at a constant pressure before being returned to the I.P. turbine. This was achieved by a horizontal primary and a pendant final reheater situated in the gas duct. Steam temperature control was achieved by non-contact type attemperators.

The boiler was kept clean by 42 gun type soot blowers in the combustion chamber and 42 long retractable blowers which cleaned the pendant and convection surfaces, all operating under automatic control from the control room.

The hot gasses from the combustion chamber were drawn through both the super heater and re-heater banks, and the air heater and precipitators by induced draught fans which expelled the gasses through the F.G.D. to the chimney. The fans would maintain a slight vacuum within the combustion chamber in order to prevent combustion gasses leaking into the boiler house. The precipitators which were entirely of steel construction collected the dust by electrostatic means, meaning there were no mechanical collectors.

== Turbo-alternators ==
Each of the four turbines was an English Electric Company multi-cylinder impulse reaction machine which would operate on a single reheat cycle with terminal steam connections of 158.6 bar (2,300 lbf/in²), 566 degrees Celsius (1051 degrees Fahrenheit) and would exhaust at a back pressure of 1.5 mmHg. Steam from the boiler passed through four strainers and two pairs of combined stop and emergency valves, each pair being associated with two throttle valves which regulated admission of steam to the H.P. cylinder inlet belt. The H.P. cylinder was composed of eight stages in total. The steam would expand through the first five stages towards the governor end and then reverse its direction and flow between the inner and outer case to the last three stages. Reversing the steam flow within the H.P. cylinder helped to balance the thrust, thus relieving the load on the single thrust bearing. From the H.P. cylinder, the steam was fed to the boiler reheater and returned to the I.P. cylinder through two strainers and two pairs of I.P. emergency valves, each pair of which was associated with a pair of interceptor valves which were attached to the cylinder. The I.P. section of the turbine was double flow with seven stages to each flow.

The exhaust steam from the I.P. cylinder would be passed to the three L.P. cylinders by cross-over pipes reducing cross sections, which distributed the flow of steam equally to each L.P. cylinder through which it expanded to the condenser. Each cylinder was double flow with five stages to each flow. A special feature of the Cottam machines was the radial condenser in which the tube nests were disposed right round the turbine L.P. shafts in a common casing. This reduced the steam velocity in the exhaust space, which together with the reduced losses in the exhaust duct improved the efficiency of the condenser. The weight of the whole structure was some hundreds of tons less than earlier structures, and the foundation block was also greatly simplified, since only a rudimentary structure above basement floor level was necessary under the L.P. turbine.

== Feed water system ==
Following condensation of the low pressure exhaust steam in the condenser, the feed water would be passed to a condensate pump mounted under the condenser. From this receiver the condensate was drawn by one or two extraction pumps and passed through a discharge strainer. The low pressure feed heating system consisted of five direct contact heaters with one high level deaerator to provide a high feed pump suction head. The direct contact L.P. heaters were arranged in two banks, comprising three and two heaters respectively. Within each bank the heaters were stacked above each other so that the condensate could drain from the lower pressure heater by gravity. The heights of the heaters were approximately inversely proportional to the bled steam pressures.

The main extraction pump discharged the condensate to No.1 D.C. heater from which it cascaded down to No.2 and then to No.3 D.C. heater by gravity. Two lift pumps delivered the condensate to No.4 D.C. heater, from which it cascaded through No.5 D.C. heater to two deaerator lift pumps. The deaerator lift pumps discharged the condensate to the deaerator and from there it passed through microwire and magnetic filters to the boiler feed pump suction main. The main boiler feed pump was driven by a steam turbine which received its steam from the main H.P. turbine exhaust. It consisted of a single cylinder eleven stage turbine turning at 5,000 rev/min and drove a multi-stage pump to give a delivery pressure of 2,940 lbf/in2. Two electrically driven Starting and Standby feed pumps were provided.

The high pressure heating system consisted of two parallel banks of two heaters, numbered 7 and 8. Each of the H.P. heaters was vertical and of the non-contact type. From the H.P. heaters the condensate, at a temperature of 253 degrees Celsius (455 degrees Fahrenheit), was passed into the boiler economiser. During unit shutdowns the whole of the feed system could be 'blanketed' with nitrogen gas. This would be in an attempt to reduce the rate at which copper and ferrous oxides form, hence reducing the 'carrying over' of these oxides to the boiler drum.

Boiler feed water make-up was supplied by the water treatment plant. This had a continuous rating of 3,672,000 litres (970,000 gallons) in 24 hours at 153,300 litres (40,500 gallons) per hour. The plant comprised three groups of cation, anion and mixed bed ion exchange resin units, together with vacuum degassing and pressure filtering plant. Each group processed 76,650 litres (20,250 gallons) per hour and normally two groups were in service at one time, with the third on standby or being regenerated.

== Circulating water system ==
The River Trent is tidal and navigable at the location of the station. The Trent River Board estimated the average and minimum summer flow rates to be 2,500 and 1,818 million litres per day (550 and 400 million gallons) respectively. There is no salt penetration to this reach of the river.

The total requirement for circulating water at Cottam power station was approximately 259.1 million litres per hour (57 million gallons per hour), and to meet the conditions of the River Board in respect of temperature and water extraction the station was designed to work with a closed circuit cooling tower system drawing only purge and make-up water from the river. The average water requirement from the river was in the order of 113.7 million litres per day (25 million gallons per day), of which 40.91 – 59.1 million litres (9–13 million gallons) were required to make necessary evaporation losses.

The C.W. system consisted of a twin culvert fed by four vertical spindle pumps feeding the condensers arranged in two parallel groups, and discharged to eight cooling towers. The cooled C.W. from the tower ponds was returned to the pump suction for re-circulation. A special feature of the C.W. plant at Cottam is the annular moat arrangement around the pump house. The moat is 45.72 m (150 ft) external diameter, 5.486 m (18 ft) deep and 3.048 m (10 ft) wide. Suction for the four pumps would be taken tangentially from the inside of the moat. This arrangement would cause a continual circular, vortex free flow of water within the moat and allowed any combination of the four pumps to be operated as the station demanded.

To prevent formation of slime and bacterial growth, automatic intermittent dosing was provided at each condenser inlet.

Each of the eight natural draught cooling towers had a normal capacity of 30.69 million litres per hour (6.75 million gallons per hour), with a normal cooling range of 8.5 degrees Celsius (47 degrees Fahrenheit). "De-icing" equipment was installed on the periphery of each tower, together with "eliminators" which reduced the system loss caused by carry over of water droplets.

== Coal plant ==
The coal plant at Cottam power station was decommissioned in 2019 and ceased energy generation.

=== Previous operations ===
The station consumption of coal, assuming 100% load factor, was 18,594 tonnes (18,300 tons) per day, or 5,080,235 tonnes (5,000,000 tons) per year, which was shipped in from overseas. The station was supplied with coal via a three-mile branch line off the Manchester and Cleethorpes railway line. This was reopened in 1967. Rail facilities included a west-facing junction on the Cleethorpes line, former oil sidings, two coal discharge lines with gross- and tare-weight weighbridges and coal hoppers. The site was capable of containing another station of comparable size, and in this case the coal input of the combined stations would approach 8,128,375 tonnes (8,000,000 tons) per year. The coal handling plant at the existing station was capable of extension to meet this requirement. All coal was delivered by rail over seven days of the week. Special 24.89 (24.5) and 32.51 tonne (32 ton) capacity wagons were developed with bottom hopper doors to suit the unloading equipment at this and other stations.

The maximum daily intake was in the order of 25,401 tonnes (25,000 tons) and was brought in by trains of approximately 1,016 tonnes (1,000 tons) payload. The on-site rail sidings formed a continuous loop and wagons were unloaded while the train was moving at 0.8 km/h (0.5 mph) by means of automatic lineside equipment. The coal was then discharged into an underground hopper of approximately 609.6 tonnes (600 tons) capacity. Weighing of the fuel and empty wagons was carried out automatically while the train was moving. The time between receiving the train and its departure was less than 60 minutes.

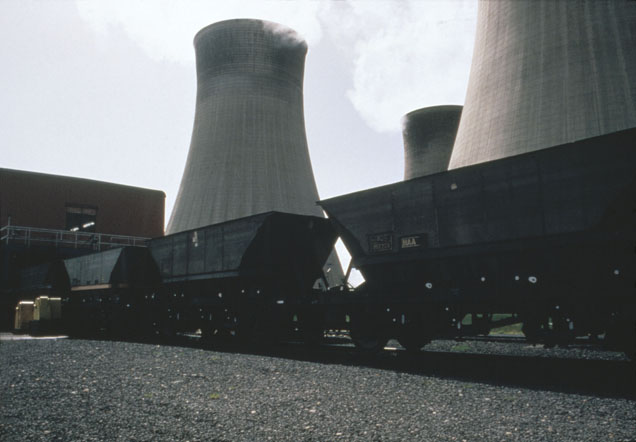
Merry go round train detail

From the underground hopper the coal could be fed either to the bunkers in the boiler house, which had a capacity of 9,348 tonnes (9,200 tons), or to the coal stocking area. 'Stocking out' was accomplished by a single radial boom conveyor feeding a working stock area of 40,642 tonnes (40,000 tons) capacity. From the working stock coal was moved by mobile plant to the permanent stock which will have a capacity of about 1,016,047 tonnes (1,000,000 tons). Reclaiming from both permanent and working stock was by mobile plant which moved the coal into an underground hopper and hence to bunkers by means of duplicate conveyor belts, each of 1,524 tonnes (1,500 tons) per hour capacity. All operations on the coal plant, including signalling for the locomotive while on site, were controlled from a central room which was situated adjacent to the unloading hopper.

The last coal train delivery to Cottam power station was carried out by GB Railfreight number 66735 on 19 June 2019.

== Ash and dust plant ==
The lifetime dust and ash make of the station is estimated to be in the order of 13,761,988 and 3,440,497 cubic metres (18 million and 4.5 million cubic yards) respectively. In raising the general station area to above river level borrow pits were created within the power station site. This, together with the filling of the remainder of the site, has made available approximately 6,116,439 cubic metres (8 million cubic yards) of ash disposal. In addition there were a number of disused gravel pits in the area, amounting to approximately 12,232,878 cubic metres (16 million cubic yards), which were to be reclaimed by filling with ash from Cottam and other nearby power stations, one being the Idle Valley Nature Reserve.

On full load operation of the four units, in the order of 975 tonnes (960 tons) per day of furnace bottom ash would be made. The ash was continuously quenched in the furnace and sluiced from the hoppers to crushers which were local to the boiler before being pumped to the ash disposal area. At the disposal area, large ash was screened out and the remaining slurry would be cycloned and classified. The de-watered ash would then be discharged to the drainage area from which loading on to road vehicles was carried out by mechanical shovel. The effluent from the cyclones and the drainage area was pumped to ash "lagoons" on site.

The precipitator hoppers had sufficient capacity to hold the dust make for 24 hours, in which time in the order of 3,902 tonnes (3,840 tons) of dust would be made. The control of the dust extraction, pumping and disposal plant was automatic with the overall control centralised in a control room adjacent to the plant. The precipitator hopper outlets were electrically heated to facilitate dust extraction. From the hoppers, the dust was fed by pneumatic air flow conveyors into a "wetting" unit which would feed into a sluice system, eventually discharging into a dust sump. The sump was emptied by single stage pumps discharging to the dust lagoons on site or in the vicinity of the station. To provide for dry dust disposal one of the three precipitators on each unit could be selected to discharge to a pneumatic conveyor feeding a 1,016 tonne (1,000 ton) capacity dry bunker. The discharge from the storage bunker could be taken dry into sealed road dust tankers, or conditioned with water into open type road vehicles.

== Control room ==
The station control room was situated to the east of, and adjacent to the turbine house. The control room, which was on the operating floor level, contained four separate unit control desks, together with control panels for common services such as the C.W. system, 400 kV switching and works electrical system. Each unit control console consisted of a semi-circular control desk, above which was alarm fascia suspended from the ceiling. Behind each control desk stood a semi-circular instrument panel. All unit operation covering start-up, loading and shut downs were carried out by the unit operator who sat at the control desk. The concept of the control is that all operations would be divided into discrete stages, each fully automatic and self-checking, with fault alarms and light indications to show the state of the plant. The sequence for each stage would be initiated by one switch on the control desk. The object of the automatic 'fixed logic' sequence control was to give consistent starting techniques which met the matching requirements of both the boiler and turbine, and allowed the unit to be loaded in as short a time as possible. Equipment was also provided for running up, loading and deloading the turbine as fully automated functions. Each unit had a 400 channel data logger which recorded instrument readings automatically and reduced the work load on the unit operator. Information recorded by the data logger was used for efficiency monitoring purposes.

Communications on the station are covered by the normal dialling telephone, and 'direct wire' telephones to important positions on the plant. Communications between control room and 'roving' operators is achieved by miniaturised personal radio equipment. A 'bleeper' radio system was also used for locating staff on the station. The site has a 24-hour security team permanently based at Cottam. Routine vehicle and foot patrols are constantly carried out. A comprehensive CCTV system is installed which enables the whole site to be comprehensively monitored around the clock.

== Gas turbines ==
Four 25 MW gas turbine generating sets were installed in the station, in a separate building adjacent to the 400 kV switching station. Their provision provided for:

- An independent supply to the station auxiliary system in time of heavy load and low frequency on the system. Operation to meet this condition was automatic including run up, synchronising of the gas turbine and load transfer.
- Peak lopping by export through the unit or station transformers.
- Standby to the unit transformers.
- Start up supplies when isolated from the grid system.

Each unit consisted of two Rolls-Royce Avon RA29 Stage 6A (1533) gas generators in parallel feeding hot gas into an English Electric two stage turbine which drove a 25 MW alternator. The exhaust gasses were passed into independent metal stacks, each 106.68 m (350 feet) in height. The plant – which was normally left un-attended – could be run up to full load in a little under two minutes. These gas turbines were decommissioned on the arrival of the CCGT installation at Cottam power station.

== 400 kV switching station ==
The switching station (or substation) is of outdoor construction and follows the layout and design developed and standardised by the CEGB. Special attention was given to the external appearance of the structures for amenities considerations. The switching station is a double bus bar system, with the main bar arranged in four sections interconnected by four section switches and two main reserve bar coupling switches. One generator is connected to each main bus bar section by way of oil filled 400 kV cables. The switchgear, bus bars and isolators are rated at 3,500 MVA. The original switches were air blast operated, operating at a pressure of 350 lbf/in^{2} (24 bar), with 12 interrupters in series in each break. In recent times several of the air blast circuit breakers were replaced by more modern SF_{6} (sulphur hexafluoride) gas circuit breakers. Following the decommissioning of the power station, the switchgear serving each of the four generator circuits was removed. The maximum continuous load current rating is 4,000 amps. The switching station forms part of the bulk transmission system interconnecting and distributing energy from the East Midlands and Yorkshire generating stations to the load centres in the south of England. The entire switching station was originally controlled from the station control room but later controlled from National Grid's national control centre.

== Operation ==
	Unit 1	Unit 2	Unit 3	Unit 4	All Units
First synchronisation to the National Grid	17:57 hours 9 June 1968	20:00 hours 21 June 1969	18:39 hours 26 October 1969	17:45 hours 6 April 1970	
Total generation	117,097 GWh	125,212 GWh	129,757 GWh	112,694 GWh	484.8 TWh
Total running hours	268,921	285,110	287,451	257,762	1,099,244
Total starts	3,707	3,209	3,303	3,278	13,197
Final desynchronisation from the National Grid	14:50 hours 23 September 2019	05:47 hours 11 September 2019	22:45 hours 2 September 2019	21:07 hours 11 April 2019	
Maximum generated in a day	12,710 MWh 12 November 1983	12,800 MWh 14 January 1984	12,916 MWh 20 October 1994	12,580 MWh 23 November 1983	50,280 MWh 12 November 1983
Maximum generated in a week	87,930 MWh Week 1, Month 12,	88,380 MWh Week 3, Month 12, 1983	88,415 MWh Week 2, Month 10, 1994	86,480 MWh Week 1, Month 3, 1986	347,660 MWh Week 1, Month 12, 1983
Total train deliveries					150,000 +
Total coal burn					183,100,000 Te
Overall generated efficiency					38.5%

== Cottam Development Centre ==
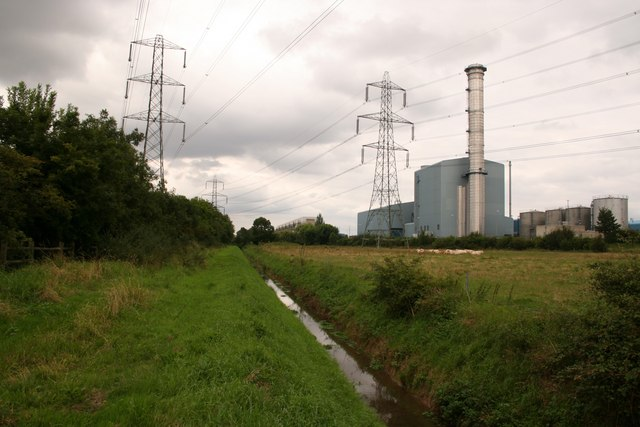
Cottam Development Centre in August 2007

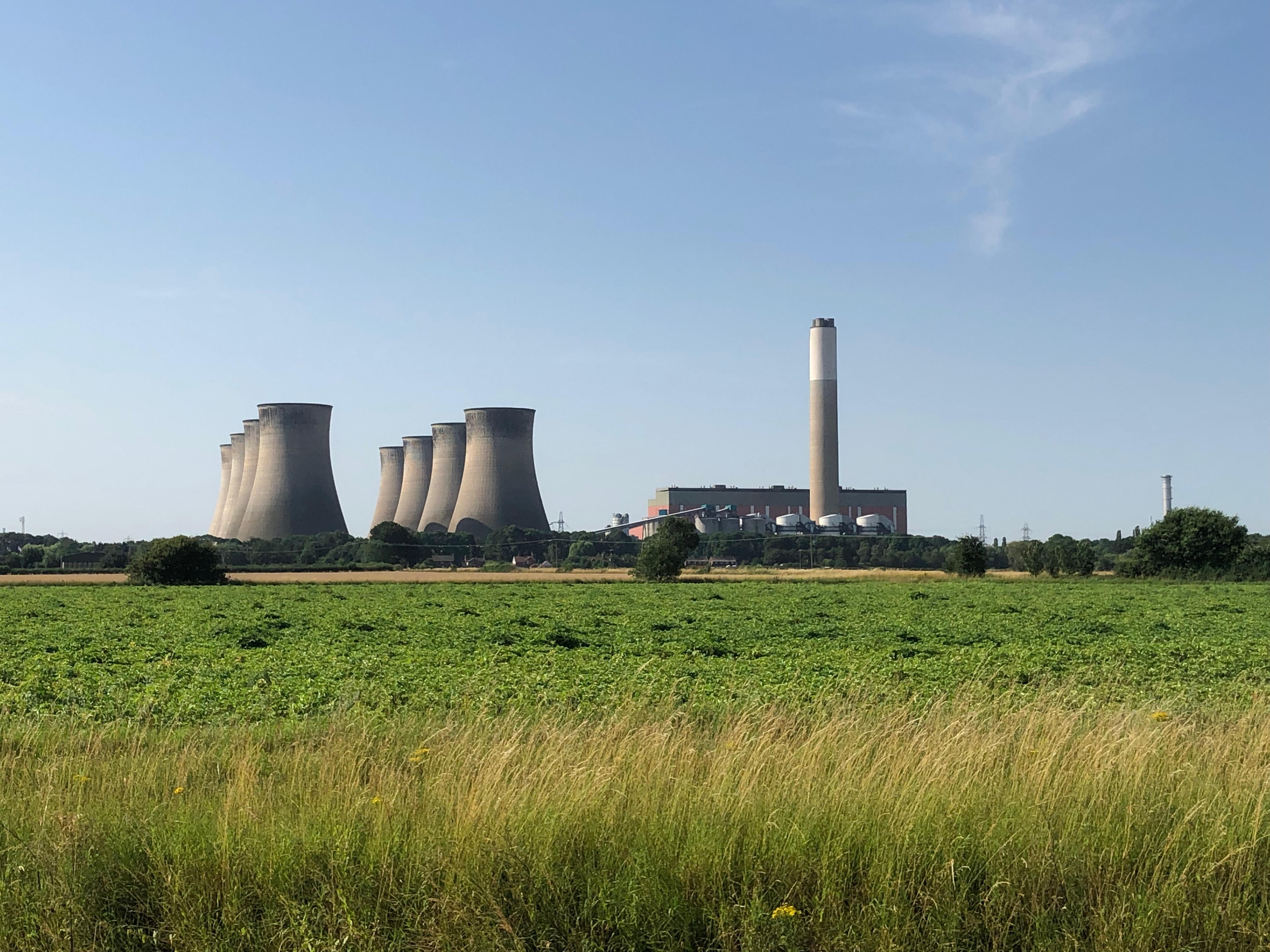
Cottam power station, viewed from the north in July 2019

The Cottam Development Centre is a 400 MW combined cycle gas turbine (CCGT) power station, fuelled by natural gas. It was built as a joint venture between Powergen and Siemens, as a testbed for Siemens to develop CCGT technology.

Construction of the station commenced in July 1997 on a football and cricket pitch adjacent to the coal-fired power station. During construction, heavy components weighing up to 400 tonnes were brought onto site using inland waterways, to avoid damaging local roads. The station opened in September 1999. In May 2002 the station was bought out by Powergen for £52 million.

=== Specification ===
The power station generates electricity using a single Siemens V94.3A (now called a SGT5-4000F) gas turbine, one BENSON heat recovery steam generator and one steam turbine. Electricity from the station has a terminal voltage of 21 kilovolts (kV), and enters the National Grid via a transformer at 400 kV. The plant has a thermal efficiency of 58%.

== Closure and demolition ==
On 7 January 2019, EDF Energy confirmed that the coal-fired power station would close on 30 September 2019 due to "challenging market conditions." This meant the plant was in operation for over 50 years, despite being designed to operate only 30 years. At the time of the announced closure it was one of seven coal-fired power stations in operation, with the government on target to take coal power off the grid by 2025. Cottam power station desynchronised Unit 1 from the grid at 14:50 on 23 September 2019. The station closed on 30 September 2019. Once demolished, the site of the station is planned to become a 'garden community' of 1500 houses.

=== Demolition ===
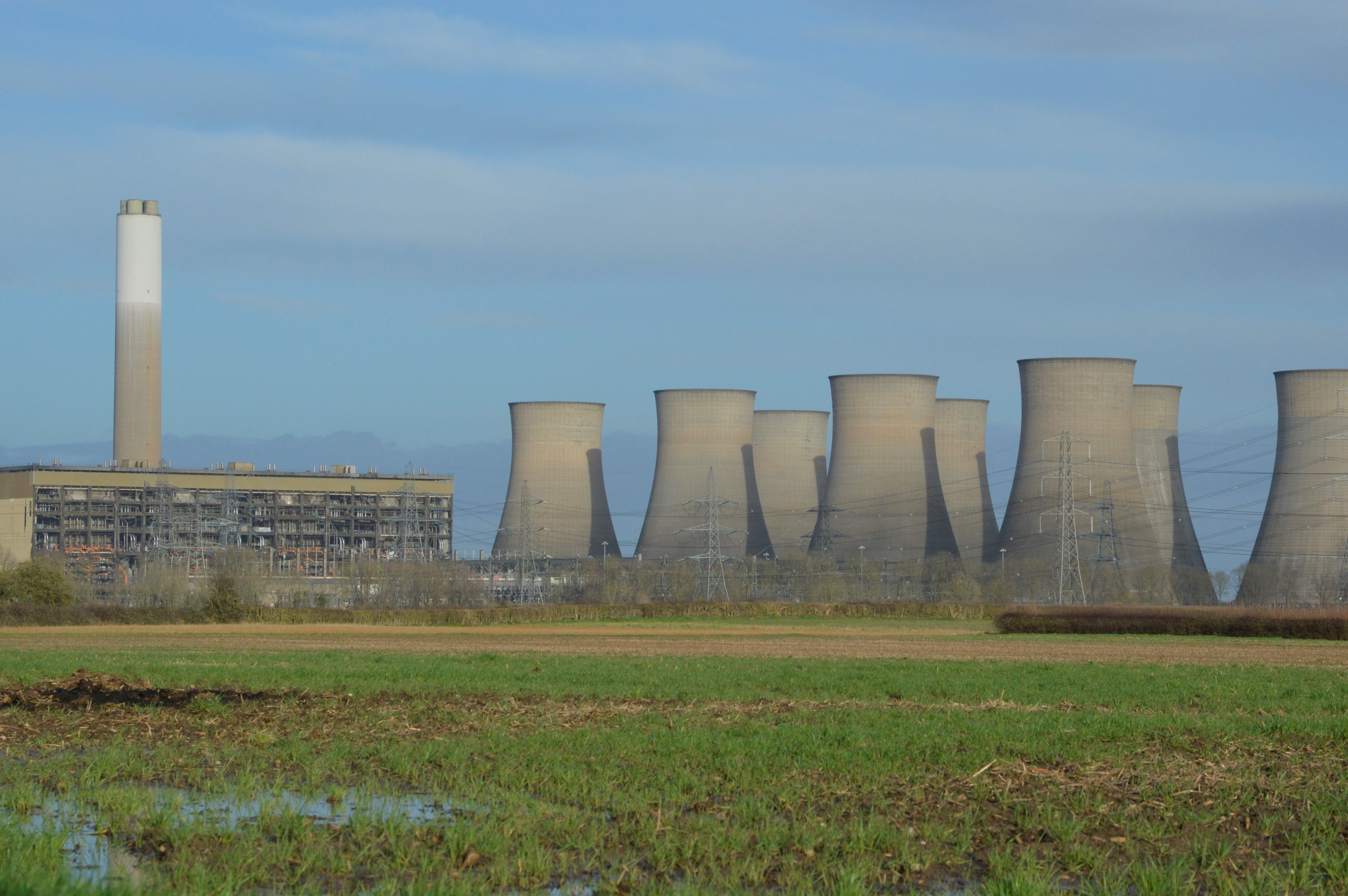
Cottam power station viewed months after the demolition of the turbine hall. Severed pipes can be seen protruding from the main building.

Blowdown of the boiler house at Cottam on 22 February 2024

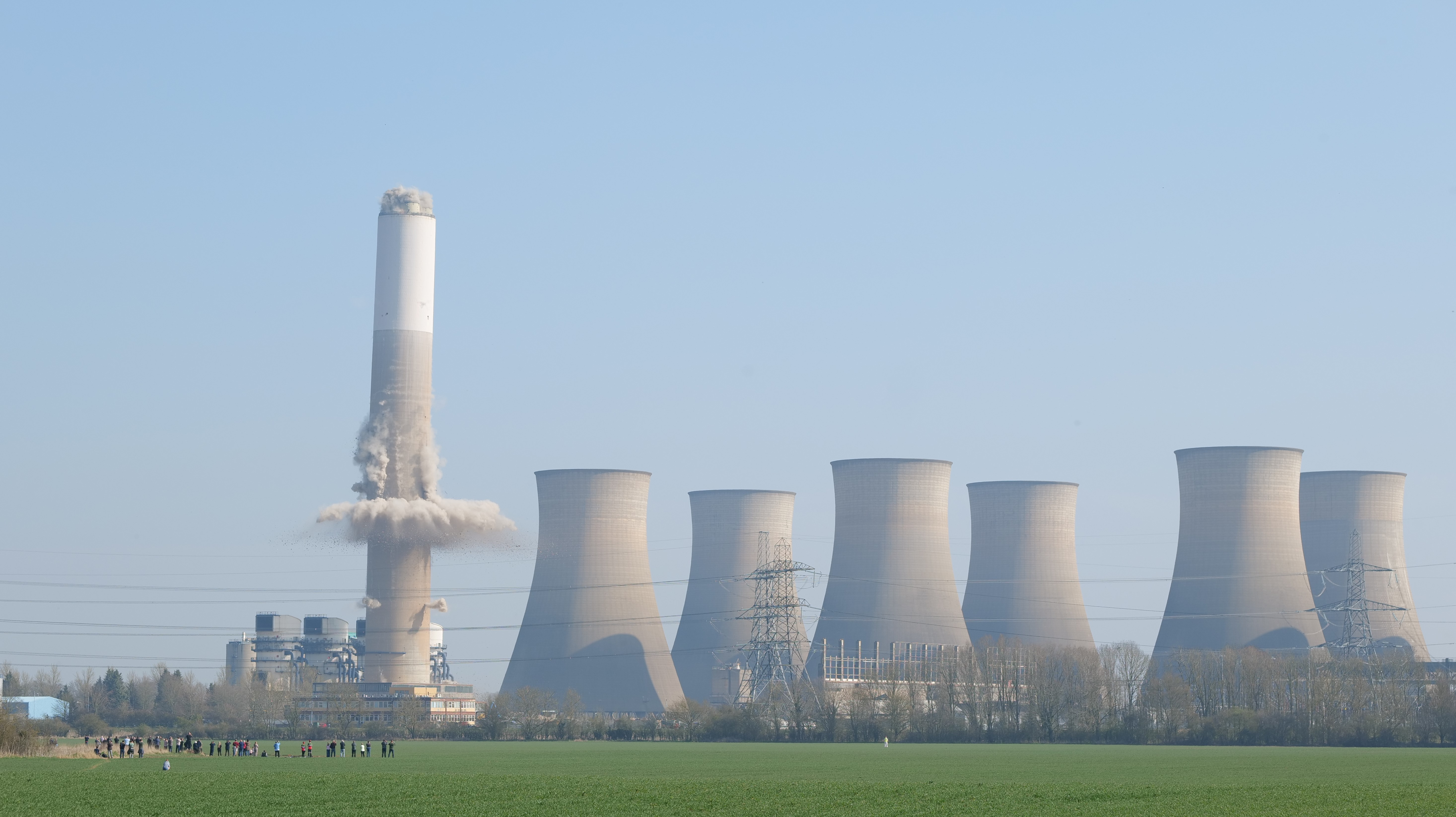
The demolition of the chimney stack at Cottam power station

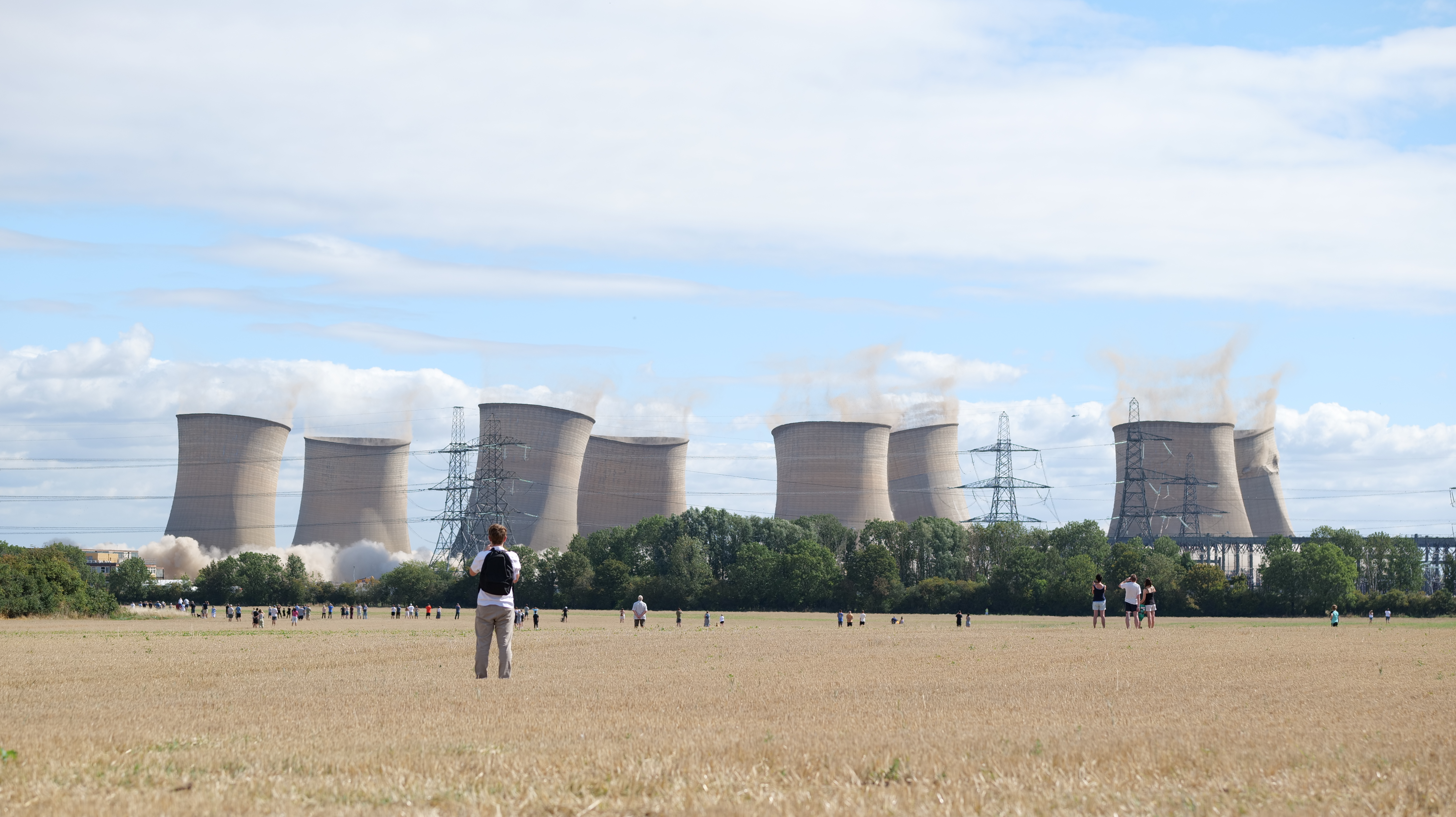
The eight cooling towers at Cottam power station being demolished. It was the most cooling towers ever simultaneously demolished.

Once decommissioning had concluded, EDF assigned the contract of demolition to the contractor Brown and Mason. The first explosive demolition occurred on 23 February 2023, with precipitators 1 and 2 being demolished followed by 3 and 4 on 13 April 2023.

On 17 August 2023, the demolition of the main building began with the DA bay, bunker bay, turbine hall and the coal conveyer all being demolished.

The boiler house was demolished on 22 February 2024 at 10 am.

The chimney stack was demolished on 20 March 2025 at 11 am.

All eight cooling towers were demolished on 14 August 2025 at 11 am, which was the final phase of the explosive demolition of Cottam power station. The demolition of the cooling towers was the largest simultaneous demolition of cooling towers ever carried out at the time. The full demolition of the site is expected by early 2026.

=== Small modular reactor project ===
In June 2026, EDF Energy and US manufacturer Holtec submitted a proposal to install up to four Holtec SMR-300 small modular reactors at Cottam, potentially powering a datacentre project at the site.

== See also ==
- Megawatt Valley
- West Burton power stations
- Ratcliffe-on-Soar Power Station
