= Castle Donington Power Station =

Former coal-fired power station in England

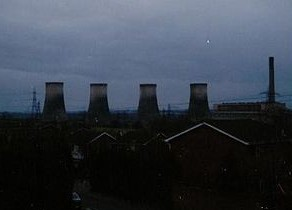
- Castle Donington Power Station
- Country: England
- Location: Leicestershire, East Midlands
- Coordinates: 52.847769°N 1.358511°W
- Status: Decommissioned
- Construction began: 1951
- Commission date: 1956–58
- Decommission date: 1994
- Operators: Central Electricity Generating Board (1958–1990); Powergen (1990–1994)

Thermal power station
- Primary fuel: Coal
- Chimneys: 2
- Cooling towers: 4
- Cooling source: River water and cooling towers

Power generation
- Units operational: 6 × 100 MW
- Make and model: Metropolitan-Vickers
- Units decommissioned: All decommissioned
- Nameplate capacity: 600MW
- Annual net output: 2,072 GWh (1980-81)

Castle Donington Power Station was a coal-fired power station situated on the River Trent near Castle Donington, Leicestershire, 5 miles (8.0 km) south-east of Derby. Construction began in 1951, and the station opened in 1958.

== History ==
Castle Donington was the first UK power station constructed with an individual boiler powering 100 Megawatt turbo-generators. There were six units with 13.8 kV turbo alternators provided by Metropolitan-Vickers and pulverised fuel boilers by Babcock & Wilcox. Three were connected to 132 kV grid and three to the 275 kV grid. The boilers at the time were 50% larger than any previous unit weighing 2,000 tonnes using pulverised coal and delivered 630 kg/s (850,000 lb/hr) of steam at 103.4 bar and 566 °C with gases exhausted through two 425 ft chimneys. Station cooling was by river water and four cooling towers 300 ft high. At full load the station needed 7,000 tonnes of coal/day which was bought in by rail Castle Donington was one of the CEGB's twenty steam power stations with the highest thermal efficiency; in 1963–4 the thermal efficiency was 32.30 per cent, 31.57 per cent in 1964–5, and 31.45 per cent in 1965–6. In 1980/1 the station sent out 2,072.453 GWh, the thermal efficiency was then 29.34 per cent. It was initially operated by the Central Electricity Generating Board. Following privatisation in 1990, the station was operated by Powergen. In 1993, four of the station's generating units were decommissioned. In 1994, the remaining two units were taken out of operation and the station closed down.

Castle Donington power station was supplied with coal via a branch off the adjacent Trent and Weston railway line. Rail facilities included an east-facing junction on the mainline, four loading arrival sidings, a gross-weight weighbridge, a four-track set of unloading hoppers, a tare-weight weighbridge, and four empty departure sidings.

The cooling water system enabled the abstraction of up to 113,700 m^{3}/h (25 million gallons per hour) of water from the River Trent. There was provision for up to 81,800 m^{3}/h (18 million gallons per hour to be pumped from the outlet channel through cooling towers back to the inlet channel for reuse.

The power station's internal railway system had the last steam locomotives in regular industrial usage in Great Britain. The two 0-4-0 saddle tank locos were built in 1953 by Robert Stephenson and Hawthorns Ltd and went into preservation upon the power station's closure with No. 1 now on the Midland Railway in Derbyshire.

Annual electricity output, in GWh, of Castle Donington

Electricity output of Castle Donington
Year	1957	1958	1959-60	1960-1	1961-2	1962-3	1963–4	1964–5	1965–6	1966–7	1971–2	1978–9	1980–1	1981–2
Electricity supplied, GWh	130.9	1,255	4,208	4,215	4,081	4,439	4,505	4,196	3,778	3,652	1,919	2,062.8	2,072.4	2,090

The power station has since been demolished and a distribution centre for Marks & Spencer has been developed on the site.
