= Willington Power Station =

Former coal-fired power station in England

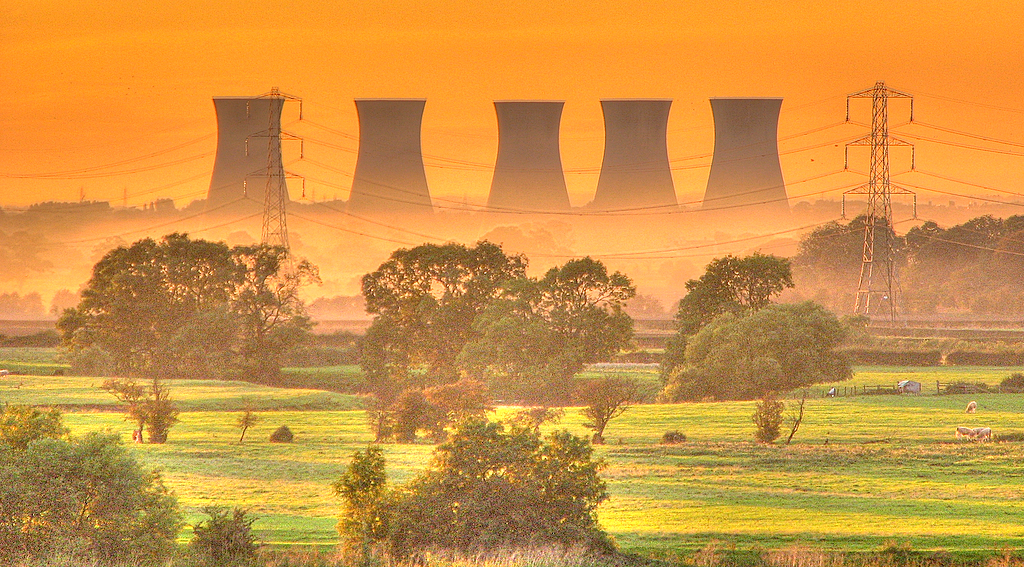
- Willington Power Station at sunset
- Country: England
- Location: Willington, Derbyshire
- Coordinates: 52.856337°N 1.542558°W
- Status: Demolished, cooling towers still standing
- Construction began: Station A: 1954; Station B: 1959
- Commission date: Station A: 1957; Station B: 1962
- Decommission date: Station A: 1995; Station B: 1999
- Owners: Central Electricity Generating Board (1957–1990); National Power (1990–1999)
- Operators: Central Electricity Generating Board (1957–1990); National Power (1990–1999)

Thermal power station
- Primary fuel: Coal
- Chimneys: Station A: 2 Station B: 1
- Cooling towers: Station B: 5
- Cooling source: Cooling Towers; River Trent

Power generation
- Nameplate capacity: 400 MW A Station; 400 MW B Station

External links
- Website: www.crepello.net/Willington/PowerStation.htm

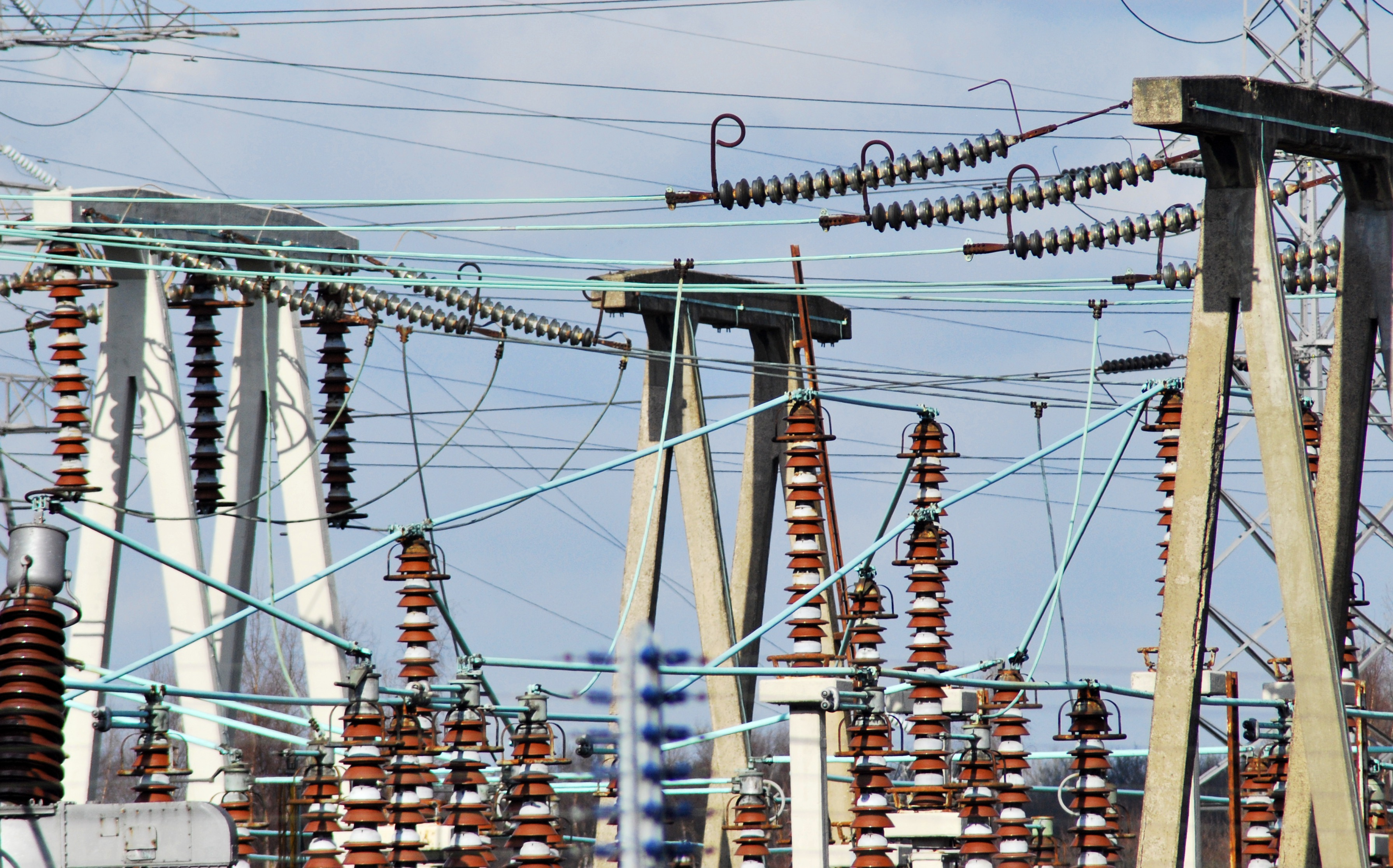
Willington power relays

Willington Power Station is a partly demolished coal-fired power station that was constructed between 1954 and 1962. The power station was built on the site at Twyford Road, between Willington and Twyford in Derbyshire, England. The power station had a capacity of 800 MW. The power station included the 'A' Station and the 'B' Station.

== History ==
Willington 'A' station began to generate electric power in December 1957. Its contained four 104,000 kW English Electric turbo-alternator sets. Two fed the 132kV substation, when two others fed the 275kV substation. Steam for the alternators was provided from four pulverised fuel fired 830,000 lb/hr International Combustion boilers The final unit was commissioned in July 1959, and the station was officially opened by the 11th Duke of Devonshire on 2 October that year. Each unit, when on full load, would burn approximately 1,000 tons of coal per day, and of this coal it included 200 tons of ash which had to be disposed of by pumping through pipe lines and by road transport.

The second power station, Willington 'B', was authorised in August 1957 with its first unit commissioned in June 1962 and second unit in March 1963. It consisted of two 200 MW generating units equipped with 1,400,000 lb/hr Babcock & Wilcox boilers and Associated Electrical Industries (AEI) turbo-alternator sets. The 'B' Station boilers would each burn 2,000 tons of coal per day on full load, leaving approximately 400 tons per boiler per day of ash, all of which had to be taken away by road. The fuel consumption at Willington Power Station, when on full load, was in the order of 8,000 tons of coal per day, the majority of which was delivered to site by British Railways from collieries of the East Midlands Coal Field. Coal was supplied via a branch off the adjacent Derby to Birmingham railway line. Rail facilities included an east-facing junction on the mainline including a connection to the Chellaston branch line, an arrival line, a hopper line including gross-weight and tare-weight weighbridges, a coal hopper and a departure line.

Willington A and B were among the CEGB’s twenty steam power stations with the highest thermal efficiency. In 1963–4 the thermal efficiency of the A station was 31.46 per cent, then 31.39 per cent in 1964–5, and 31.28 per cent in 1965–6. In 1963–4 the thermal efficiency of the B station was 32.47 per cent, then 31.69 per cent in 1964–5, and 31.59 per cent in 1965–6. The annual electricity output of Willington A & B were:

Electricity output of Willington A
Year	1959–60	1960–1	1961–2	1962–3	1963–4	1964–5	1965–6	1966–7	1971–2	1978–9	1980–1	1981–2
Electricity supplied, GWh	1,898	2,017	2,367	2,627	2,344	2,346	2,285	2,386	1,350	1,391	1,507.2	1,376

Electricity output of Willington B
Year	1962–3	1963–4	1964–5	1965–6	1966–7	1971–2	1978–9	1980–1	1981–2
Electricity supplied, GWh	363	1,454	1,112	902	2,127	1,601	1,501	2,053.3	1,568

The output from the Willington Power Stations was fed into the 132kV and 275kV transmission system. Over these two transmission systems power was delivered to the surrounding area, and to a large extent to the South of England for use in the areas of Greater London and Bristol.

The stations were privatised and sold to National Power in the early 1990s. Willington A closed in May 1995 and the B Station followed in 1999. Although most of the stations were demolished at the turn of the millennium, the five cooling towers continue to dominate the skyline of the local area. The site was earmarked for a large residential development, but the application was rejected and in 2011 permission was granted for a new power station to be built on the site.

The 'A' and 'B' Stations were unique among power plants in the United Kingdom. They consisted of a central boiler area with the boilers arranged in a square formation, flanked on two sides by identical turbine houses, each enclosing two turbine generating sets. The main reason for adopting this unusual plan was to reduce the capital cost of the station by the use of a special temporary lifting rig for site handling of the 160 ton generator stator. In a conventional turbine house design of the overhead crane, its runway beams, the vertical support columns and their foundations are all designed to handle the heaviest lift which is invariably the generator stator. At Willington a large saving of the costs was achieved by installing overhead cranes and support structures rated at 50 tons lifting capacity, intended to handle only the second heaviest item of plant.

The use of this special rig for the stator lifting necessitated a loading bay, with access for road transporters, alongside each generator foundation block and the best way to provide this facility was to arrange the turbine generators in pairs, steam ends together. Both ‘A’ and ‘B’ stations were also notable in the United Kingdom for the ‘part closure’ of their boiler plant instead of the more conventional scheme where all the boilers are completely housed in one overall structure. The ‘A’ station boilers were described as semi-outdoor. Their milling plant, the lower parts of the furnaces and the boiler top sections were enclosed in weatherproof buildings. The 'B' station boilers, apart from their milling plant, were almost completely outdoor and had only small weatherproof rooms at each end of their drums to house certain equipment.

In 1973-4, Willington 'B' was awarded the Christopher Hinton trophy in recognition of good housekeeping. In the mid-1990s a pair of peregrine falcons nested in one of the site's huge cooling towers. Unlike many bird of prey breeding sites, this was widely publicised because of its impregnable location. As one of the CEGB's 'two shifting' stations, Willington did not generally produce electricity 24 hours a day. The generating units were taken off load in the early hours of each morning and put back on again six or seven hours later, in accordance with the country's fluctuating demand for power. The power station was also the subject of a short documentary by Channel 4 titled Drones in Forbidden Zones. Some scenes from the 2013 film The Selfish Giant were shot in the abandoned grounds of the former power station.

== Specification ==
=== Civil ===
The total area of the Willington site was 286 acres. The 'A' and 'B' stations together had a total staff of about 550.

=== Steam turbines ===
The four ‘A’ station turbines could each develop about 140,000 horse power. The two ‘B’ stations turbines could each develop about 270,000 horse power. This meant that at full output the station was capable of working at the rate of about 1,100,000 horse power.

=== CW system ===
There were four circulating water pumps per station. The 'A' station pumps handled up to 4.1 million gallons per hour and on the 'B' station they each handled up to 2.8 million gallons per hour. In addition, on the ‘A’ station, there were three similar pumps which delivered water from the condensers to the cooling towers when there was low river flow, each of these handled 5 million gallons per hour. The cooling water system enabled the abstraction of up to 75,000 m^{3}/h (16.5 million gallons per hour) of water from the River Trent.

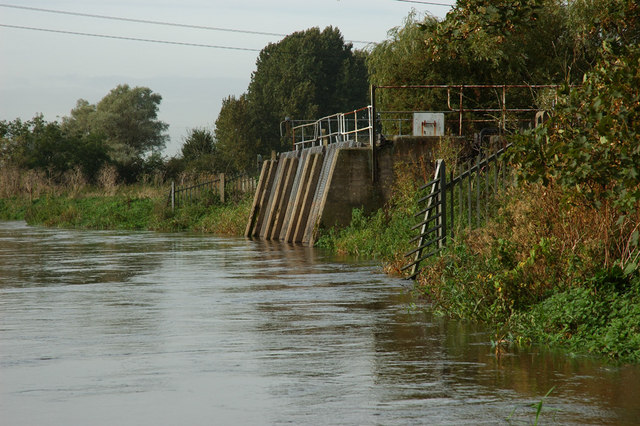
Cooling water intake

=== Coal plant ===
The coal stock had a maximum storage capacity of 250,000 tons. There were 15 miles of railway track and 2 1/2 miles of conveyor belts on site. At full output the six boilers would burn 52,000 tons of coal and produce 9,000 tons of ash per week. When running at full load the two stations together burnt a total of 8,400 tonnes of coal every 24 hours. The coal was delivered by 'merry-go-round' trains which shuttled continuously between pitheads and power stations. Each train brought about 1,000 tonnes of coal and passed through the sidings at a non stop 0.5 m.p.h. The doors in the bottom of each wagon opened automatically as the train went over the hopper beneath the rail tracks, the coal then fell through onto the conveyor. From there it either transferred to the stockpile or was taken to the boiler bunkers to be used immediately.

=== Ash & dust plant ===
Dust from the flue gases was extracted by electrostatic precipitators and collected in hoppers. From there it was either taken by lorry or pipeline to fill in nearby disused gravel pits, or sold for use in civil works such as motorway construction or the manufacture of lightweight building blocks. When a gravel pit had been completely filled they were covered with topsoil and returned to agriculture. Every day up to 1,400 tonnes of ash were produced in the boilers.

=== Electrical system ===
The two stations sent onto the grid system about 125MW of electricity. The three chimneys were each 425 ft high together weighed over 15,000 tons. The five cooling towers were each 300 ft high and approximately 200 ft in diameter at the base and each weighed 6,500 tons.
