= Drakelow Power Station =

Series of power stations in England

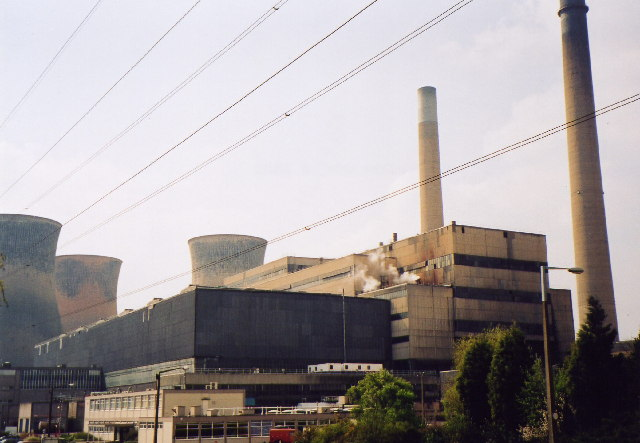
- Drakelow C Power Station in 2002
- Country: England
- Location: Derbyshire, East Midlands
- Coordinates: 52.773608°N 1.656805°W
- Status: Decommissioned and demolished
- Construction began: A: 1950, B: 1955, C: 1960
- Commission date: A: 1955, B: 1959, C: 1964
- Decommission date: A: 1984, B: 1993, C: 2003
- Construction cost: A: £23 Million
- Owner: E.ON UK (1990–present)
- Operators: British Electricity Authority (1950–1955); Central Electricity Authority (1955–1957); Central Electricity Generating Board (1958–1990); Powergen (1990–2001); E.ON UK (2001–2021); Vital Energi (2021–present)

Thermal power station
- Primary fuel: Coal
- Secondary fuel: Diesel C station
- Chimneys: A: 2, B: 2, C: 2
- Cooling towers: A & B: 4, C: 6

Power generation
- Units operational: A: 2 × 60 MW & 2 × 62 MW; B: 4 × 120 MW; C: 1 × 255 MW & 2 × 325 MW
- Units decommissioned: All
- Nameplate capacity: A: 244 MW; B: 480 MW; C: 906.2 MW

External links
- Commons: Related media on Commons

Drakelow Power Station refers to a series of three now decommissioned and demolished coal-fired power stations located 2.4 mi (3.9 km) south of Burton upon Trent, Staffordshire in the West Midlands of England, on the River Trent. However, the station was actually located in the county of Derbyshire, in the East Midlands. The power station was a distinguishable landmark of Burton, which is most famous for its breweries.

== History ==
=== Pre-Construction ===
The West Wing of Drakelow Hall

The Drakelow power stations were built on the site of Drakelow Hall, a stately home on the south bank of the River Trent. Twenty eight generations of the Gresley family had considered the estate as their ancestral home. It had appeared in the Domesday Book and the family could trace its history back to the time of the Norse Vikings. A book that was published in 1899, "The Gresleys of Drakelowe", is the accepted history of the family. The hall was demolished in 1934 and its site then earmarked for development in the early 1940s. The remains of the Elizabethan hall occupied part of the site even after the power station was built. The site was chosen for the construction of a power station because it was around 750 acres (3.0 km^{2}) in size and was in close proximity to the River Trent as well as the main Leicester to Burton railway to the north, the Burton to Tamworth road to the south-east, and was close to the East Midlands coalfields.

=== Construction ===
By the 1940s, the estate was no longer owned by the Gresley family, but by Sir Clifford Gothard. The sale of the land was agreed for a three-stage development of electricity generation on the site. Planning permission for the construction of the station was granted in March 1950. The £23 million project was considered a great technological advancement in its day. Rapid progress was being made with the development of larger boilers and generator units. Drakelow A Power Station was commissioned in 1955 and had 2 × 60 MW and 2 × 62 MW English Electric turbo-alternators giving a total capacity of 240 megawatts (MW). Each turbine was fed from a Internal Combustion Ltd 515,000 lb/hr 1500 lb/sq inch boiler using pulverised fuel firing and six stages feed heating. Both the A and B stations were brick built. The A station had two chimneys each at 360 ft high initially with two cooling towers each 300 ft high. By the time of its opening, work had already started on its larger 480 MW sister Drakelow B.

Drakelow B

The contract for site clearance and the main foundations was placed in January 1955 with work beginning in April. The first unit was commissioned in April 1959 and the final unit in 1960. There were four single-drum reheat boilers with a maximum continuous evaporative capacity of 860,000 lb/hr one from International Combustion Ltd and three from Foster Wheeler Ltd feeding four 120 MW C.A. Parsons turbo alternators. The turbines were of the three-cylinder (High, Intermediate & Low) impulse reaction type running at 3,000 r.p.m. after passing through the high pressure cylinder the steam was returned to the boiler for reheating before entering the intermediate cylinder. The steam conditions at the turbine stop valve were 1,500 psi. at 1,000°F, with single stage reheating to 1,005°F at 367 psi at the reheater outlet and a final feed temperature of 435°F at the economiser inlet. Like the “A” station, the “B” station had two brick chimneys 400 ft high and two ferroconcrete cooling towers, each 307 ft high and with throat diameters of 132 ft. These towers were used in common with the “A” station.

All coal was delivered to site by rail at an average rate of 5,600 tons/day. Three side discharge tipplers unloaded the coal, which was taken either directly to the boiler bunkers by 1,000 ton/hr belt conveyors or to the 540,000 ton capacity store area.

It was officially opened on Friday 21 October 1955 by Mr J Eccles, the deputy chairman of the Central Electricity Authority. It was the first of its kind.

Drakelow C

Drakelow C Power Station was the largest stage of the build, Construction started in 1960 and generation began in 1964. The architect was Frankland Dark of Farmer & Dark. With six larger, 360 ft (110 m) cooling towers, two 168 m (551 ft) chimneys and two 350MW and two 375MW generators (the CEGB Statistical Yearbook 1980-81 says there were two 326 MW and one 325 MW generators), it dwarfed both the A and B stations put together, having a total generating capacity of 1450 MW. The two 375MW sets were unusually provided by different supplies. Turbo alternators were from AEI and English Electric, and boilers Babcock & Wilcox and International combustion. The latter both delivered 2,500,000 lbs/hr of steam at 3,650 Ib/sq in at 1,110°F with reheating to 1,055°F these being the first of this supercritical steam conditions. The cooling towers were arranged in two groups of three, and one tower in each group was coloured a warm red to bring them visually forward, as had been done at West Burton power station.

The total generation capacity was 2170 MW over the three stations, making it the largest electricity generation site in Europe for a time.

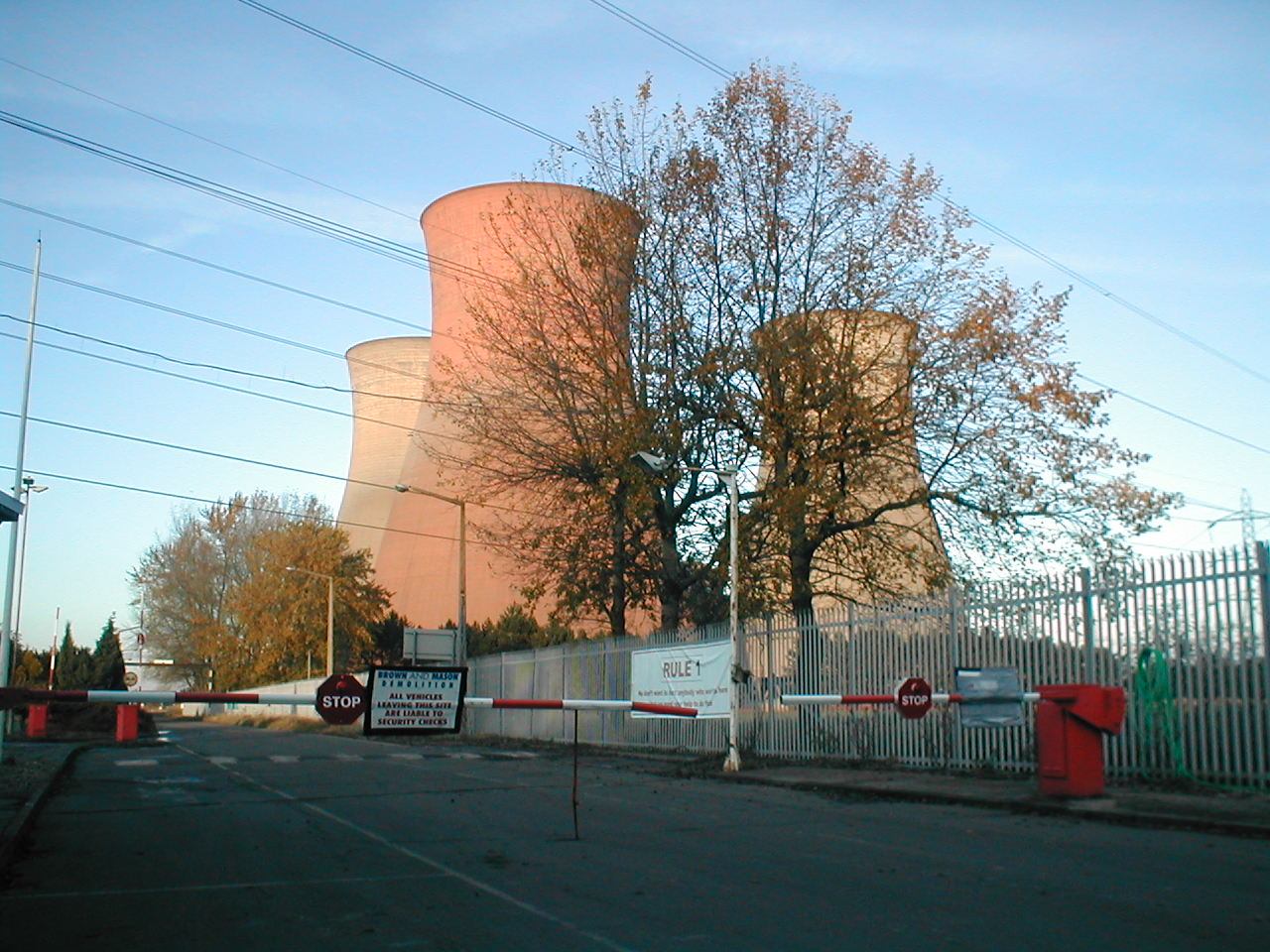
The cooling towers of Drakelow power station were 360 feet (110 m) high.

== Operations ==
Drakelow power stations were supplied with coal via a branch off the adjacent Leicester and Burton railway line. Rail facilities included east- and west-facing junctions on the mainline, A and B station reception sidings, a merry-go-round loop with an associated coal hopper; the reception and departure sidings for the C station included weighbridges, coal hoppers, and ash and coal sidings.

The cooling water system enabled the abstraction of up to 36,400 m^{3}/h (8 million gallons per hour) of water from the River Trent.

The A station boilers operated on pulverised coal and delivered 260.0 kg/s of steam at 103.4 bar and 566 °C. In 1980/1 the thermal efficiency was 25.51 per cent.

Electricity output of Drakelow A
| Year | 1956 | 1957 | 1958 | 1959–60 | 1960–61 | 1961–62 | 1962–63 | 1966–67 | 1971–72 | 1978–79 | 1980–81 | 1981–82 |
|---|---|---|---|---|---|---|---|---|---|---|---|---|
| Electricity supplied, GWh | 498 | 1,122 | 1,451 | 1,474 | 1,538 | 1,546 | 1,465 | 1,653 | 859 | 754 | 520 | 218 |

The B station boilers also operated on pulverised coal and delivered 432.0 kg/s of steam at 103.4 bar and 538 °C. Drakelow B was one of the CEGB's twenty steam power stations with the highest thermal efficiency; in 1959-60 the thermal efficiency was 32.38 per cent, in 1963–4 the thermal efficiency was 33.81 per cent, 33.26 per cent in 1964–5, and 31.49 per cent in 1965–6. The annual electricity output of Drakelow B was:

Electricity output of Drakelow B
| Year | 1959–60 | 1960–61 | 1961–62 | 1962–63 | 1963–64 | 1964–65 | 1965–66 | 1966–67 | 1971–72 | 1978–79 | 1980–81 | 1981–82 |
|---|---|---|---|---|---|---|---|---|---|---|---|---|
| Electricity supplied, GWh | 546 | 1,339 | 2,398 | 2,644 | 2,344 | 2,486 | 2,536 | 2,710 | 1,525 | 1575 | 1,503.8 | 1,693 |

The C station boilers operated on pulverised coal and delivered 788.0 kg/s of steam at 241.3/158.6 bar and 593/566 °C. In 1980/1 the thermal efficiency was 29.60 per cent. The electricity output was:

Electricity output of Drakelow C
| Year | 1966–67 | 1971–72 | 1978–79 | 1980–81 | 1981–82 |
|---|---|---|---|---|---|
| Electricity supplied, GWh | 1,588 | 3,687 | 3,121 | 3,440 | 4,035 |

The Drakelow power stations had a workforce of hundreds of people. The station had its own Football, Cricket and Rugby clubs and became part of the community by holding various charity events. Drakelow also proudly boasted a clean accident record. A popular nature trail was housed within the station's grounds.

The station itself did experience several events in its time. A minor fire broke out at the station in the early 1980s and part of C Station was flooded when the River Trent burst its banks in 2000. Overall however, the station flowed through a rather seamless life.

The Drakelow site's ownership changed hands on several occasions. It was sold to TXU, an American company, and then in the early 1990s, to Powergen. Powergen were then bought out by E.ON UK in 2001.

== Closure and demolition ==
The A station closed in 1984 and the B station closed in 1993 after surpassing its designed life expectancy. The cooling towers were demolished on 20 December 1998 and by this time the four chimneys and main buildings had also been demolished, leaving only the C Station operating.

The cooling towers; the final structures remain just hours before their demolition

One of the station's generating sets was taken out of operation in 1995, reducing the station's capacity by 333 MW. There had been talk about the closure of Drakelow C Power Station since late 2002. However, in January 2003, E.ON announced that the station was to close and on 31 March 2003, the C station was desynchronized from the National Grid. It was mothballed soon after and left standing until October 2005. At 05.00 a.m. on 17 November 2005, the two tall chimneys were demolished. By April 2006, the two 170 ft (52 m) tall boiler houses had been stripped down to their steel frames, which were demolished at 10.00 a.m. on 27 April 2006.

The six remaining cooling towers were scheduled to be demolished in July 2006. However, the six towers remained standing past their blow down time as a fault with the detonator was found. This was a disappointment for the thousands of spectators which had gathered to see the demolition. A new date for the demolition was set for 20 September 2006 at 10.00 p.m., when the towers finally came down – but again, not without fault. One set of towers came down at 10.00 p.m., but the other three failed after rabbits had chewed through the detonation cord. However at 10.50 p.m. the final set of towers came crashing down, ending the era of Drakelow Power Station.

== Re-use of the site ==
In September 2005, E.ON applied for government permission to build a 1,220 MW CCGT gas-fired power station on the site of the coal-fired stations. It would cost £350 million to construct and would consist of three generating units. On 16 October 2007, section 36 consent was granted to allow for the construction of the new station. They had planned for construction to begin in 2008, with the goal of having the plant operational by early 2011. There were also plans to build a biomass-fired power station on the site. In 2015 and 2019, Future Earth Energy was granted permission for an energy-from-waste generator. Instead, Vital Energi opened an energy-from-waste facility on the site in 2023, on land leased from E.ON.

2,100 homes have been built on the eastern part of the site, in stages since permission was granted in 2012. The development is known as Drakelow Park.

| Preceded by Barking Power Station | Largest Power Station in the UK; 1962-1966 | Succeeded by Blyth Power Station |
