= Thermal Oxide Reprocessing Plant =

Decommissioned UK nuclear fuel reprocessing plant (1994–2018)

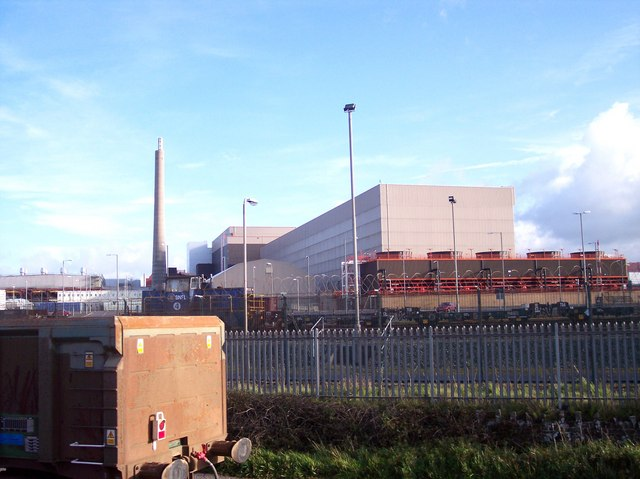
- The THORP building viewed from the south behind an internal rail line
- Country: England, United Kingdom
- Location: Cumbria, North West England
- Coordinates: 54.4155°N 3.5017°W
- Status: storage only
- Construction began: 1974
- Commission date: 1994
- Decommission date: 2018 (ceased reprocessing, fuel storage continuing)
- Construction cost: £1.8 billion
- Owner: Nuclear Decommissioning Authority
- Operator: Sellafield Ltd
- Cooling source: Forced draft cooling towers

The Thermal Oxide Reprocessing Plant, or THORP, is a nuclear fuel reprocessing plant at Sellafield in Cumbria, England. THORP is owned by the Nuclear Decommissioning Authority and operated by Sellafield Ltd, the site licensee.

Spent nuclear fuel from nuclear reactors was reprocessed to separate the 96% uranium and the 1% plutonium from the 3% radioactive wastes, which are treated and stored at the plant. The uranium is then made available for customers to be manufactured into new fuel, and the plutonium incorporated into mixed oxide fuel.

On 14 November 2018 it was announced that reprocessing operations had ended at THORP after earning £9bn in revenue. The receipt and storage facility (which makes up nearly half of THORP's physical footprint), will operate through to the 2070s to receive and store spent nuclear fuel from the UK's PWR and AGR fleet. The decommissioning is expected to start around 2075.

== History ==
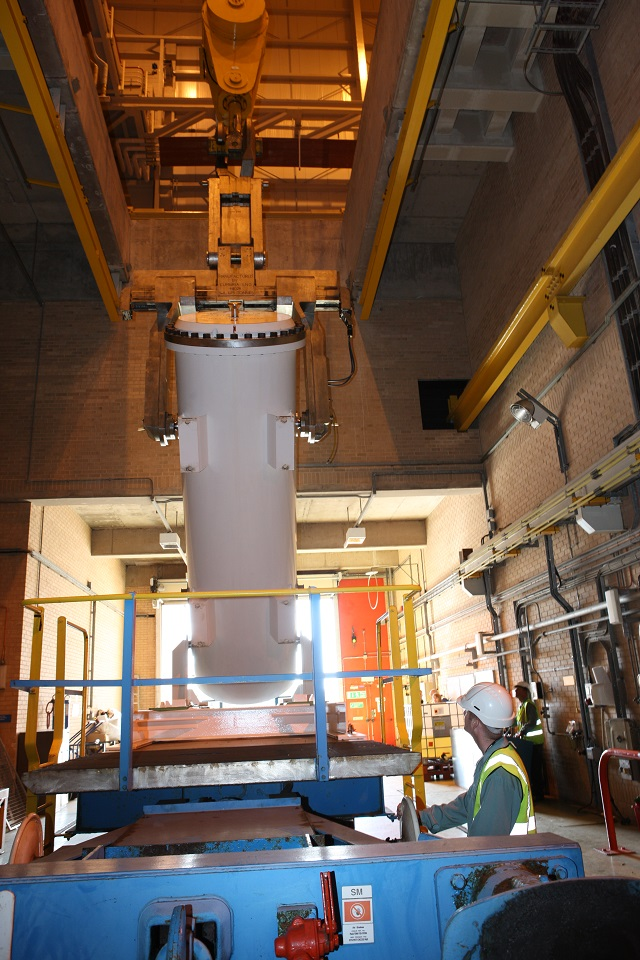
THORP's first fuel load in 1994

Between 1977 and 1978 an inquiry was held into an application by British Nuclear Fuels plc for outline planning permission to build a new plant to reprocess irradiated oxide nuclear fuel from both UK and foreign reactors. The inquiry was to answer three questions:

1. Should oxide fuel from United Kingdom reactors be reprocessed in this country at all; whether at Windscale or elsewhere?
2. If yes, should such reprocessing be carried on at Windscale?
3. If yes, should the reprocessing plant be about double the estimated site required to handle United Kingdom oxide fuels and be used as to the spare capacity, for reprocessing foreign fuels?

The result of the inquiry was that the new plant, the Thermal Oxide Reprocessing Plant, was given the go-ahead in 1978.

Construction of THORP started in 1979, and was completed in 1994. The plant went into operation in August 1997. Build cost was £1.8 billion.

THORP's first irradiated fuel rod was sheared in March 1994, which was followed in January 1995 by the chemical separation plant processing the irradiated fuel feed solution that had been produced in the previous year by the Head End plant. By early 1998 over 1400 t of irradiated fuel has been reprocessed in THORP, and the plant was steadily and successfully ramped up to its normal operating throughput throughout this time. At this time, the performance of the THORP Chemical Separation Plant had been excellent, above all, the uranium-plutonium separation stage, which received extensive development to deal with the effects of the fission product technetium, has given an overall separation performance well in excess of the minimum flowsheet requirement. THORP's discharges represented a small fraction of overall discharges from the wider Sellafield site.

On 14 November 2018 it was announced that reprocessing operations had ended at THORP after all existing reprocessing contracts had been fulfilled. It had reprocessed 9,331 tonnes of used nuclear fuel from 30 customers in nine countries, earning £9bn in revenue. The receipt and storage facility within THORP continues to operate.

Decommissioning will take place after several decades to allow radiation levels to decline, and is expected to occur between 2075 and 2095. The estimated cost of decommissioning is forecast as £4 billion at 2018 prices.

In January 2025, the government announced that the 140 tonnes of civil plutonium produced by reprocessing, originally considered a valuable asset, would be immobilised and eventually disposed of in a geological disposal facility, rather than used to produce MOX fuel which was evaluated as an uneconomic option.

== Design ==
The chemical flowsheet for THORP is designed to add less non-volatile matter to the first cycle PUREX raffinate. One way in which this is done is by avoiding the use of ferrous compounds as plutonium reducing agents. In this plant the reduction is done using either hydrazine or HAN (hydroxylamine nitrate). The plant releases gaseous emissions of krypton-85, a radioactive beta-emitter with a half-life of 10.7 years. The Radiological Protection Institute of Ireland (RPII) commenced 24-hour atmospheric monitoring for krypton-85 in 1993, prior to the plant's commissioning.

The cooled oxide fuel is chopped up in the Shear Cell and the fuel dissolved in nitric acid. It is chemically conditioned before passing to the chemical separation plant. Pulsed columns (designated HA/HS) are used to initially separate the majority of the uranium and plutonium from the fission products by transferring them into the solvent phase, which comprises tri-butyl phosphate in odourless kerosene (TBP/OK). The transfer is done in the HA column with the HS column providing further removal of fission products. 2 further pulsed columns (designated BS/BX) and a mixer/settler assembly (1BXX) then separate the uranium and plutonium into separate streams. Plutonium is reduced to the +3 oxidation state, which is insoluble in the solvent phase so ends up in the aqueous phase exiting the 1BX column.

The 1BXX mixer/settler completes the removal of Pu from the solvent phase. The 1BS column removes any remaining Uranium from the aqueous phase by the use of fresh solvent.

Pulsed columns then purify the plutonium, removing the troublesome fission products that remain. A mixer/settler (1C) is used to transfer (washes) the uranium across to the aqueous phase ready for the next stage. Uranium purification is achieved using three mixer settlers (UP1 - UP3) similar to those in use on the existing Magnox reprocessing plant. Evaporation of the two product streams then occurs before further processing is undertaken. Uranium is converted to UO_{3} powder while the plutonium is converted to PuO_{2} powder and sent to storage.

Pulsed columns were chosen to avoid the risk of a criticality incident occurring within the plant. This can happen if sufficient fissile material comes together to start an uncontrolled chain reaction, producing a large release of neutrons. The risks and mechanisms are well understood and the plant design is arranged to prevent its occurrence, i.e.: intrinsically safe.

== 2005 internal leak ==
On 9 May 2005 it was announced that THORP suffered a large leak of a highly radioactive solution, which had started in July 2004. British Nuclear Group's board of inquiry determined that a design error led to the leak, while a complacent culture at the plant delayed detection for nine months. Operations staff did not discover the leak until safeguards staff reported major fluid accountancy discrepancies. Altogether 83 cubic metres (82,966 litres) of hot nitric acid solution leaked from a small fractured feedpipe, which was discovered when a remote camera was sent in to examine THORP's Feed Clarification Cell on 19 April 2005. All the fluids collected under gravity into the secondary containment, which is a stainless steel tub embedded in 2-metre thick reinforced concrete, capable of holding 250 cubic metres of fluids. The solution from the spill was estimated to contain 20 metric tons of uranium and 160 kilograms of plutonium. The leaked solution was safely recovered into primary containment using originally installed steam ejectors. Radiation levels in the cell precluded entry of humans. The pipe fractured due to lateral motion of an accountancy tank, which measures volume by weight and moves horizontally and vertically in the process. The tank's original design had restraint blocks to prevent lateral motion, but these were later removed from the design for seismic uncoupling.

The incident was classified as Level 3 out of 7 on the International Nuclear Event Scale (INES), a "serious incident", due to the amount of radioactive inventory that leaked from primary to secondary containment without discovery over a number of months. This was initially considered by BNFL to be surprisingly high, but the specifications of the scale required it. The British Nuclear Group was convicted for breaches of health and safety regulations following the accident, and fined £500,000.

Production at the plant restarted in late 2007, but in early 2008 stopped again for the repair of an underwater lift that moved fuel for reprocessing.

== See also ==
- Nuclear fuel cycle
- Reprocessed uranium
- Red oil
- Pyrometalurgical Processing

Other reprocessing sites

- COGEMA La Hague site
- Rokkasho Reprocessing Plant
- West Valley Reprocessing Plant
- Mayak
- Tōkai, Ibaraki (Tokaimura nuclear accident)
