= Sellafield =

Nuclear site in Cumbria, England

Sellafield nuclear site
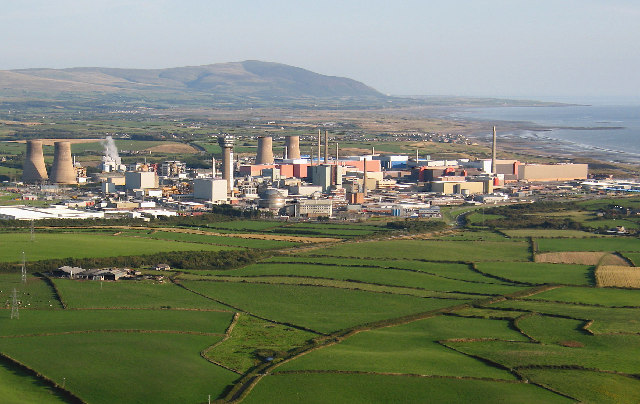
- 2005 view of the site

- Location within England
- Official name: Sellafield Site. Known 1956-1971 as Windscale & Calder Works, known 1947-1956 as Windscale Works.
- Country: England
- Location: Seascale, Cumbria
- Coordinates: 54.4205°N 3.4975°W
- Status: Decommissioning in progress
- Commission date: Windscale Piles (non-power generating): 1950; Calder Hall: 1956; Windscale AGR: 1962
- Owner: Nuclear Decommissioning Authority
- Operator: Sellafield Ltd
- Employees: 10,000+

Nuclear power station
- Reactor type: Magnox (Calder Hall); AGR prototype (Windscale)

Power generation
- Units operational: No nuclear power generation since 2003. Processes still active: spent fuel storage, waste processing and storage, and plant decommissioning.
- Units decommissioned: Units taken out of service: Calder Hall: 4 x 60 MWe (gross); Windscale AGR: 1 x 36 MWe. Final decommissioning for complete site 2120

External links
- Commons: Related media on Commons

Sellafield, formerly known as Windscale, is a large multi-function nuclear site close to Seascale on the coast of Cumbria, England. As of August 2022, primary activities are nuclear waste processing and storage and nuclear decommissioning. Former activities included nuclear power generation from 1956 to 2003, and nuclear fuel reprocessing from 1952 to 2022.

The licensed site covers an area of 265 hectares (650 acres), and comprises more than 200 nuclear facilities and more than 1,000 buildings. It is Europe's largest nuclear site and has the most diverse range of nuclear facilities in the world on a single site. The site's workforce size varies, and before the COVID-19 pandemic was approximately 10,000 people. The UK's National Nuclear Laboratory has its Central Laboratory and headquarters on the site.

Originally built as a Royal Ordnance Factory in 1942, the site briefly passed into the ownership of Courtaulds for rayon manufacture following World War II, but was re-acquired by the Ministry of Supply in 1947 for the production of plutonium for nuclear weapons which required the construction of the Windscale Piles and the First Generation Reprocessing Plant, and it was renamed "Windscale Works". Subsequent key developments have included the building of Calder Hall nuclear power station - the world's first nuclear power station to export electricity on a commercial scale to a public grid, the Magnox fuel reprocessing plant, the prototype Advanced Gas-cooled Reactor (AGR) and the Thermal Oxide Reprocessing Plant (THORP). Decommissioning projects include the Windscale Piles, Calder Hall nuclear power station, and historic reprocessing facilities and waste stores.

The site is owned by the Nuclear Decommissioning Authority (NDA) which is a non-departmental public body of the UK government. Following a period 2008–2016 of management by a private consortium, the site was returned to direct government control by making the Site Management Company, Sellafield Ltd, a subsidiary of the NDA. Decommissioning of legacy facilities, some of which date back to the UK's first efforts to produce an atomic bomb, is planned for completion by 2120 at a cost of £121 billion.

Sellafield was the site in 1957 of the UK's worst nuclear accident. This was the Windscale fire which occurred when uranium metal fuel ignited inside Windscale Pile no.1. Radioactive contamination was released into the environment, it has been estimated that this caused around 240 cancers in the long term, with 100 of these predicted to be fatal, though epidemiological studies have failed to find any such increase. The incident was rated 5 out of a possible 7 on the International Nuclear Event Scale.

== Site development ==
=== Royal Ordnance Factory ===
The site was established with the creation of Royal Ordnance Factory ROF Sellafield by the Ministry of Supply in 1942; built by John Laing & Son at the hamlet of Low Sellafield. The nearby sister factory, ROF Drigg, had been constructed in 1940, 3 miles (5 km) to the south-east near the village of Drigg. Both sites were classed as Explosive ROFs, producing high-explosive at ROF Drigg, and propellant at ROF Sellafield. They were built in this location to be remote from large centres of population because of the hazardous nature of the process, and to reduce the risk of World War II enemy air attack. There were also existing rail links, and a good supply of high quality water from Wastwater. Production ceased at both factories immediately following the defeat of Japan.

=== Start of nuclear activity ===
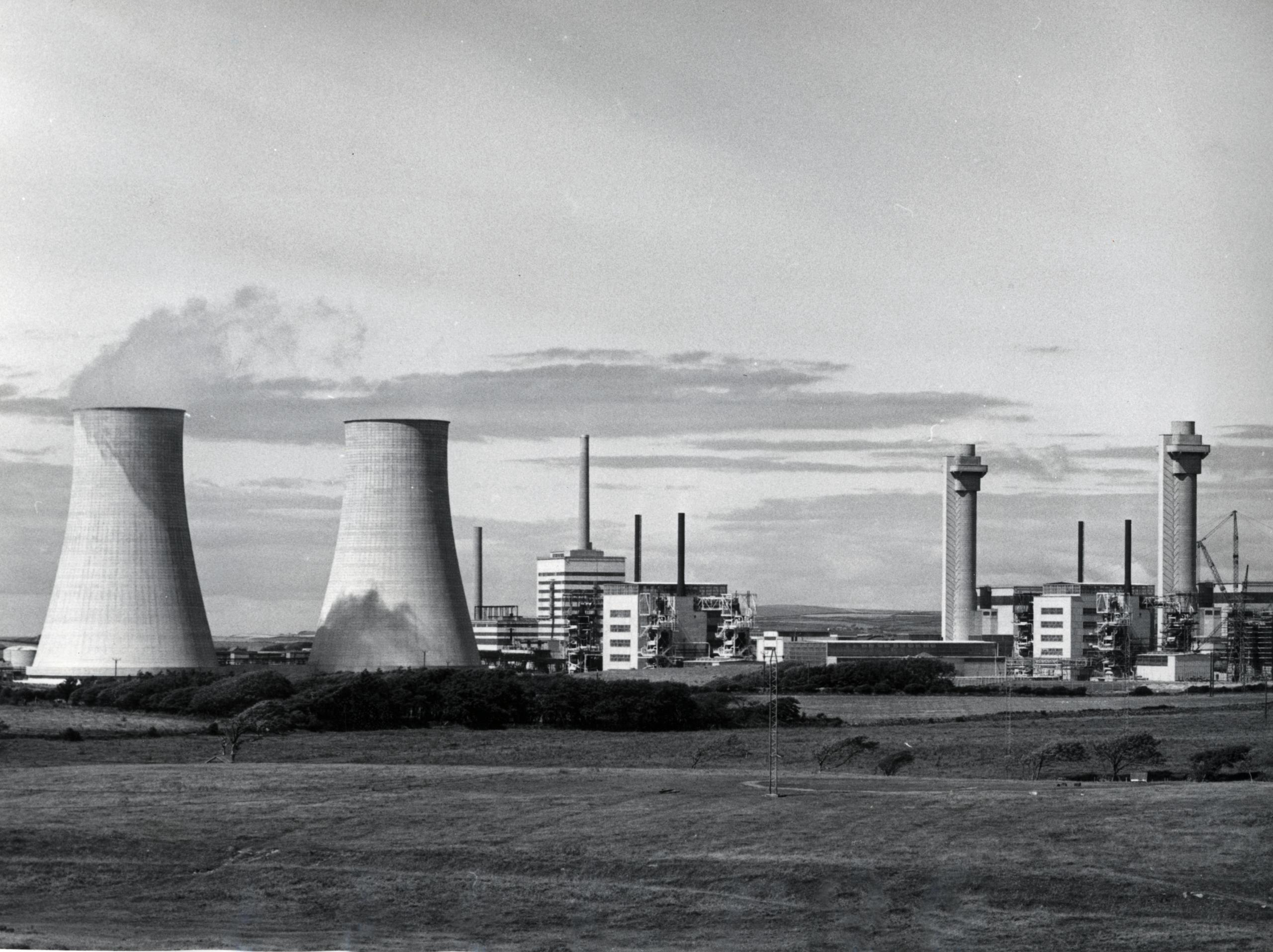
The site in 1956. In foreground Calder Hall cooling towers and two Magnox reactors. Background L to R: First Generation reprocessing plant, Windscale pile chimneys.

After the War, the Sellafield site was briefly in the ownership of Courtaulds for development as a rayon factory, but was re-acquired by the Ministry of Supply for the production of plutonium for nuclear weapons. Construction of the nuclear facilities commenced in September 1947 and the site was renamed Windscale Works. The building of the nuclear plant was a huge construction project, requiring a peak effort of 5,000 workers. The two air-cooled and open-circuit, graphite-moderated Windscale reactors (the "Windscale Piles") and the associated First Generation Reprocessing Plant, producing the first British weapons grade plutonium-239, were central to the UK nuclear weapons programme of the 1950s.

Windscale Pile No.1 became operational in October 1950, just over three years from the start of construction, and Pile No.2 became operational in June 1951.

=== Calder Hall power station ===
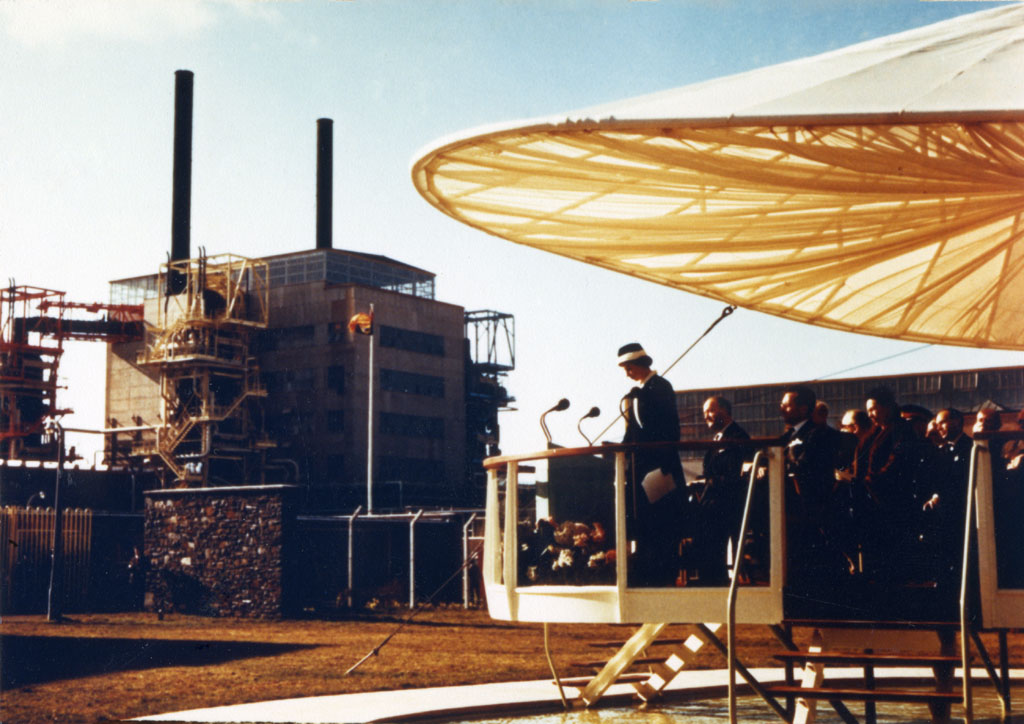
Queen Elizabeth II officially opening Calder Hall nuclear power station on 17 October 1956

With the creation of the United Kingdom Atomic Energy Authority (UKAEA) in 1954, ownership of Windscale Works passed to the UKAEA. At this time the site was being expanded across the River Calder where four Magnox reactors were being built to create the world's first commercial-scale nuclear power station. This became operational in 1956 and was the world's first nuclear power station to export electricity on a commercial scale to a public grid. The whole site became known as "Windscale and Calder Works".

=== British Nuclear Fuels Ltd (BNFL) ===
Following the break-up of the UKAEA into a research division (UKAEA) and a newly created company for nuclear production British Nuclear Fuels Ltd (BNFL) in 1971, a major part of the site was transferred to BNFL ownership and management. In 1981 BNFL's Windscale and Calder Works was renamed Sellafield as part of a major reorganisation of the site and there was a consolidation of management under one head of the entire BNFL Sellafield site. The remainder of the site remained in the hands of the UKAEA and was still called Windscale.

=== Reprocessing ===
Sellafield was the centre of UK nuclear reprocessing operations, which separated the uranium and plutonium from minor actinides and fission products present in spent nuclear fuel. The uranium could be used in the manufacture of new nuclear fuel, or in applications where its density was an asset. The plutonium was originally used for weapons, and later in the manufacture of mixed oxide fuel (MOX) for thermal reactors.

Reprocessing ceased on 17 July 2022, when the Magnox Reprocessing Plant completed its last batch of fuel after 58 years of operation. In January 2025, the government announced that the 140 tonnes civil plutonium stockpile produced by reprocessing, originally considered a valuable asset, would be immobilised and eventually disposed of in a geological disposal facility, rather than used to produce MOX fuel which was evaluated as an uneconomic option.

Sellafield Site has had three separate fuel reprocessing facilities:

1. First Generation (Windscale): 1951–1973 – production of Plutonium for weapons. 750 tonnes fuel per year
2. Magnox: 1964–2022 – Magnox national reactor fleet fuel reprocessing
3. Thermal Oxide Reprocessing Plant (THORP): 1994–2018 – National AGR fleet oxide fuel reprocessing

Magnox and THORP had a combined annual capacity of nearly 2,300 tonnes.

Despite the end of reprocessing, Sellafield is still the central location which receives and stores used fuel from the UK's fleet of gas cooled reactor stations. The site has also processed overseas spent fuel from several countries under contract. There had been concern that Sellafield would become a repository for unwanted international nuclear material. However, contracts agreed since 1976 with overseas customers required that all High Level Waste be returned to the country of origin. The UK retained low and intermediate level waste resulting from that reprocessing, and in substitution shipped out a radiologically equivalent amount of its own HLW. The policy was designed to be environmentally neutral by expediting, and reducing the volume, of shipments.

=== Decommissioning ===
Nuclear decommissioning is the process whereby a nuclear facility is dismantled to the point that it no longer requires measures for radiation protection. Sellafield's highest priority nuclear decommissioning challenges are mainly the legacy of the early nuclear research and nuclear weapons programmes. There is a considerable inventory of buildings which have ceased operating but are in "care and maintenance" awaiting final decommissioning.

The 2018–2021 NDA business plan for Sellafield decommissioning is focused on older legacy high hazard plants and includes the following key activities in the area of Legacy Ponds and Silos;

- Pile Fuel Storage Pond (PFSP): Sustain sludge exports and prepare for de-watering
- Pile Fuel Cladding Silo (PFCS): Complete commissioning of Box Encapsulation Plant to receive silo contents, and begin retrievals.
- First Generation Magnox Storage Pond (FGMSP): Continue to retrieve fuel and sludge.
- Magnox Swarf Storage Silo (MSSS): Begin retrievals from the silo.

Also:

- Continue demolition of Pile No.1 chimney

Defuelling and removal of most buildings at Calder Hall is expected to take until 2032, followed by a care and maintenance phase from 2033 to 2104. Demolition of reactor buildings and final site clearance is planned for 2105 to 2114.

As of March 2021, the NDA reported that they had:

- Removed significant quantities of bulk fuel and over 300 tonnes of solid intermediate level waste (ILW) from the PFSP
- Removed more than 100 cubic metres (3,500 cu ft) of sludge from the FGMSP
- Installed the first of the 400-tonne silo emptying plants in the MSSS. The retrievals started in June 2022; it is estimated this phase will continue for 20 years.
- Created new access and equipment installed for waste retrieval from the PFCS

In August 2023, work started to retrieve waste from the PFCS, which had been created in the 1950s to store cladding from used Windscale Piles nuclear fuel, described as "a momentous milestone in the decommissioning story at Sellafield as the first batch of waste was successfully retrieved from the site’s oldest waste store" and "one of the most complex and difficult decommissioning challenges in the world".

==== Management model following the Energy Act 2004 ====
Following ownership by BNFL, since 1 April 2005 the site has been owned by the Nuclear Decommissioning Authority (NDA), a non-departmental public body of the UK government created by the Energy Act 2004 as part of government policy to introduce competition into the nuclear industry to better control decommissioning costs. In 2008, the NDA awarded Nuclear Management Partners (NMP) the position of Parent Body Organisation of Sellafield Ltd under their standard management model for NDA sites; this gave them complete responsibility for operating and managing the NDA-owned assets, the direct workforce and the site. This consortium, composed of US company URS, British company AMEC and French company Areva, was initially awarded a contract for five years, with extension options to 17 years, and in November 2008, NMP took over management of the site. In October 2008, it was revealed that the British government had agreed to issue the managing body for Sellafield an unlimited indemnity against future accidents; according to The Guardian, "the indemnity even covers accidents and leaks that are the consortium's fault." The indemnity had been rushed through prior to the summer parliamentary recess without notifying parliament.

On 13 January 2015, the NDA announced that NMP would lose the management contract for Sellafield as the "complexity and technical uncertainties presented significantly greater challenges than other NDA sites", and the site was therefore "less well suited" to the NDA's existing standard management model. The new structure, which came into effect on 1 April 2016, saw Sellafield Ltd. become a subsidiary of the NDA.

==== Decommissioning cost estimates ====
NDA increasing estimates of remaining cost of decommissioning and clean-up
Year of estimate	Sellafield*	Other NDA sites	Total
Year of estimate	(£ billions, discounted)		
2006–07	21.9	11.7	33.6
2007–08	24.8	15.9	40.7
2009–10	25.2	19.9	45.1
2010–11	32.7	16.5	49.2
2011–12	37.2	15.6	52.9
2012–13	42.0	16.9	58.9
2013–14	47.9	17.0	64.9
2014–15	53.2	12.5	65.7
2015–16	117.4	43.3	160.7
2018–19	97.0	21.3	118.3
* Sellafield includes Calder Hall and Windscale, and Energy Trading

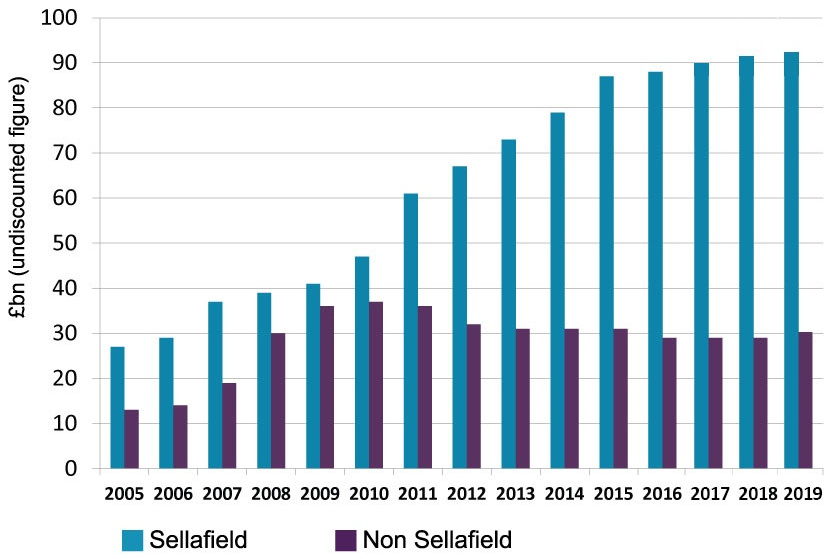
Chart of the estimated growing decommission cost for Sellafield versus other sites 2005-2120 (undiscounted), revisions until 2019

Sellafield accounts for most of the NDA's decommissioning budget and the increases in future cost estimates. Its share (discounted, including Calder Hall and Windscale; excluding Capenhurst) increased from 21.9 billion (65%) in 2007 to 97.0 billion (82%) in 2019.

In 2013, the UK Government Public Accounts Committee issued a critical report stating that NMP had failed to reduce costs and delays. Between 2005 and 2013, the annual costs of operating Sellafield had increased from £900 million to about £1.6 billion. The estimated lifetime undiscounted cost of dealing with the Sellafield site increased to £67.5 billion. NMP management was forced to apologise after projected clean-up costs passed the £70 billion mark in late 2013. In 2014, the final undiscounted decommissioning cost projection for Sellafield was increased to £79.1 billion, and in 2015 to £117.4 billion. The annual operating cost was projected to be £2 billion in 2016. In 2018, it was revealed that the cost could be £121 billion by 2120.

The cost does not include the costs for future geological disposal (GDF). These include research, design, construction, operation and closure. The undiscounted lifetime costs for a GDF were estimated £12.2 billion in 2008. The NDA's share of this is £10.1 billion, which results in a discounted amount of about £3.4 billion.

== Major plants ==
=== Windscale Piles ===
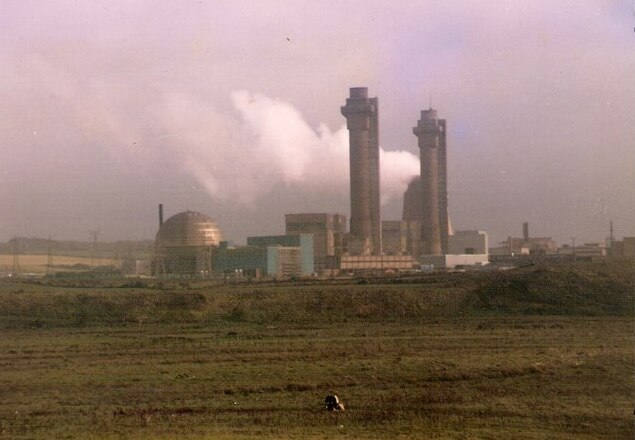
1985 view. L to R; The "Golf Ball" WAGR reactor, the Windscale Piles with their large exhaust stacks. The water vapour is from the Calder Hall cooling towers.

Following the decision taken by the British government in January 1947 to develop nuclear weapons, Sellafield was chosen as the location of the plutonium production plant, consisting of the Windscale Piles and accompanying reprocessing plant to separate plutonium from the spent nuclear fuel. Unlike the early US nuclear reactors at Hanford, which consisted of a graphite core cooled by water, the Windscale Piles consisted of a graphite core cooled by air. Each pile contained almost 2,000 tonnes (1,968 L/T) of graphite, and measured over 7.3 metres (24 ft) high by 15.2 metres (50 ft) in diameter. Fuel for the reactor consisted of rods of uranium metal, approximately 30 cm (12 inches) long by 2.5 cm (0.98 inches) in diameter, and clad in aluminium. The initial fuel was loaded into the Windscale Piles in July 1950. By July 1952 the separation plant was being used to separate plutonium and uranium from spent fuel.

On 10 October 1957, the Windscale Piles were shut down following a fire in Pile 1 during a scheduled graphite annealing procedure. The fire badly damaged the pile core and released an estimated 750 terabecquerels (20,000 curies) of radioactive material, including 22 TBq of Cs-137 and 740 TBq of I-131 into the shafts. Thanks to innovative filters installed by Nobel laureate Sir John Cockcroft 95% of the material was captured. As a precautionary measure, milk from surrounding farming areas was destroyed. However, no residents from the surrounding area were evacuated or informed of the danger of the radiation leakage. It is now believed that there have been 100 to 240 cancer deaths as a result of the release of radioactive material. Following the fire, Pile 1 was unserviceable, and Pile 2, although undamaged by the fire, was shut down as a precaution.

In the 1990s, the United Kingdom Atomic Energy Authority started to implement plans to decommission, disassemble and clean up both piles. In 2004, Pile 1 still contained about 15 tonnes (14.76 L/T) of uranium fuel, and final completion of the decommissioning is not expected until at least 2037.

In 2014, radioactive sludge in the Pile Fuel Storage Pond (PFSP), built between 1948 and 1952, started to be repackaged in drums to reduce the "sludge hazard" and to allow the pond to be decommissioned. Decommissioning will require retrieval of sludge and solids, prior to dewatering and deconstruction, with retrievals planned for completion in 2016.

=== First Generation Reprocessing Plant ===
The first generation reprocessing plant was built to extract the plutonium from spent fuel to provide fissile material for the UK's atomic weapons programme, and for exchange with the United States through the US-UK Mutual Defence Agreement.

The Butex process was used (a forerunner to the more efficient Purex process) and the plant operated from 1951 until 1964, with an annual capacity of 300 tonnes (295 L/T) of pile spent fuel, or 750 tonnes (738 L/T) of low burn-up fuel. It was first used to reprocess fuel from the Windscale Piles but was later repurposed to process fuel from UK Magnox reactors. Following the commissioning of the dedicated Magnox Reprocessing Plant, it became a pre-handling plant to allow oxide fuel to be reprocessed in the Magnox reprocessing plant. It was closed in 1973 after a violent reaction within the plant contaminated the entire plant and 34 workers with ruthenium-106.

=== Magnox Reprocessing Plant ===
In 1964, the Magnox reprocessing plant came on stream to reprocess spent nuclear fuel from the national Magnox reactor fleet. The plant used the "plutonium uranium extraction" (Purex) method for reprocessing spent fuel, with tributyl phosphate in odourless kerosene and nitric acid as extraction agents. The Purex process produces uranium, plutonium and fission products as separated chemical output streams.

Magnox fuel has to be reprocessed in a timely fashion since the cladding corrodes if stored underwater, and routes for dry storage have not yet been proven, so it has been necessary to keep the plant running to process all the Magnox fuel inventory.

Magnox fuel reprocessing ceased on 17 July 2022, when the reprocessing plant completed its last batch of fuel after 58 years of operation. A total of 55,000 tonnes of fuel had been processed during those years.

=== The First Generation Magnox Storage Pond (FGMSP) ===
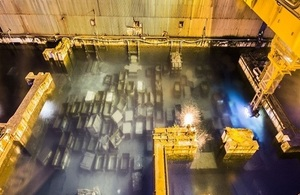
FGMSP - showing spent fuel skips stored underwater

This was built to support reprocessing of fuel from UK Magnox power stations through the Magnox Reprocessing Plant. It was initially planned to be used to keep fuel rods in for three months before they were reprocessed, but was used for operations between 1959 until 1985. The pond is 20 m (66 ft) wide, 150 m (490 ft) long and 6 m (20 ft) deep. Originally called B30 (and nicknamed 'Dirty 30'), the pond was renamed in 2018.

As of 2014, the FGMSP remains as a priority decommissioning project. As well as nuclear waste, the pond holds about 1,200 cubic metres (42,000 cu ft) of radioactive sludge of unknown characteristics and 14,000 cubic metres (490,000 cu ft) of contaminated water. Decommissioning requires retrieval of the radioactive sludge into a newly built Sludge Packaging Plant, as well as fuel and skip retrieval. Completion of this will allow the dewatering and dismantling of the remaining structure.

Future work will immobilise the sludge for long-term storage, and process solids through the Fuel Handling Plant for treatment and storage.

=== Magnox Swarf Storage Silo (MSSS) ===
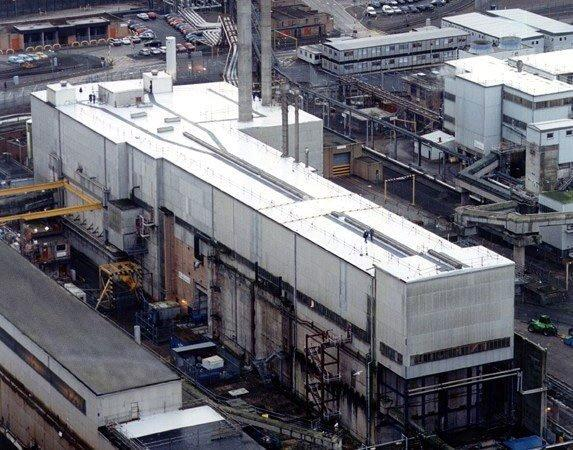
The Magnox Swarf Storage silo pictured from the air on the Sellafield Site. At the time the photo was taken, the silo had undergone significant modernisation work to facilitate the retrieval operations.

The Magnox Swarf Storage Silo is a large building on the Sellafield Site which contains intermediate level fuel cladding swarf waste arising from reprocessing Magnox reactor fuel. Once expended fuel was removed from the Magnox reactors, the magnesium cladding was removed prior to the chemical processing of the fuel rod. To accomplish this, the fuel can was fed through a machine known as a "decanner" which stripped the cladding off the inner rod creating the swarf of broken magnesium alloy cladding as a waste product. Since the start of commercial Magnox reprocessing in 1964 (the same year MSSS began operations), this waste was deposited into individual water-filled compartments within the MSSS. As they became full, more were added between the 1960s and 1983 totalling 22 compartments. In the early 1990s, the wet storage of this waste was no longer seen as the most effective way to store the material, and in later years was replaced with a dry storage method. The long-term storage and subsequent degradation of the magnesium alloy swarf in water causes an exothermic reaction which releases hydrogen gas. Normal operating procedures and overall design of the silo allowed for hydrogen gas to be safely vented before it could accumulate, and the heat can be removed through re-circulation of the water. The Magnox Swarf Storage Silo ceased being filled in 2000.

Many of the historic Sellafield operating practices have been superseded by better and safer alternatives. Consequently, since 2000 the Magnox Encapsulation Plant on site has been responsible for the safe processing and dry storage of Magnox cladding swarf. This still left the problem of removing waste material that has been stored in hazardous conditions in the MSSS. To accomplish this complex task, Sellafield Ltd has partnered with commercial firms to design, construct and operate a remotely operated waste retrieval facility called the Silo Emptying Plant (SEP). This is designed to retrieve waste from the MSSS which will be processed in other specially designed site facilities, and then placed in interim storage at Sellafield. Longer term it is hoped such waste would be consigned to a deep geological repository for permanent storage. The radioactive inventory and lack of modern standards in the silo has made it the most complicated and highest-priority mission in the NDA estate nationally. Preparations for removing the 11,000m3 of historic waste from the silos and storing safely have taken over 20 years.

On 10 June 2022, Sellafield Ltd announced the commencement of waste retrievals which will take approximately 20 years. Once this radiological hazard has been removed, the MSSS structure can be demolished.

=== Calder Hall nuclear power station ===
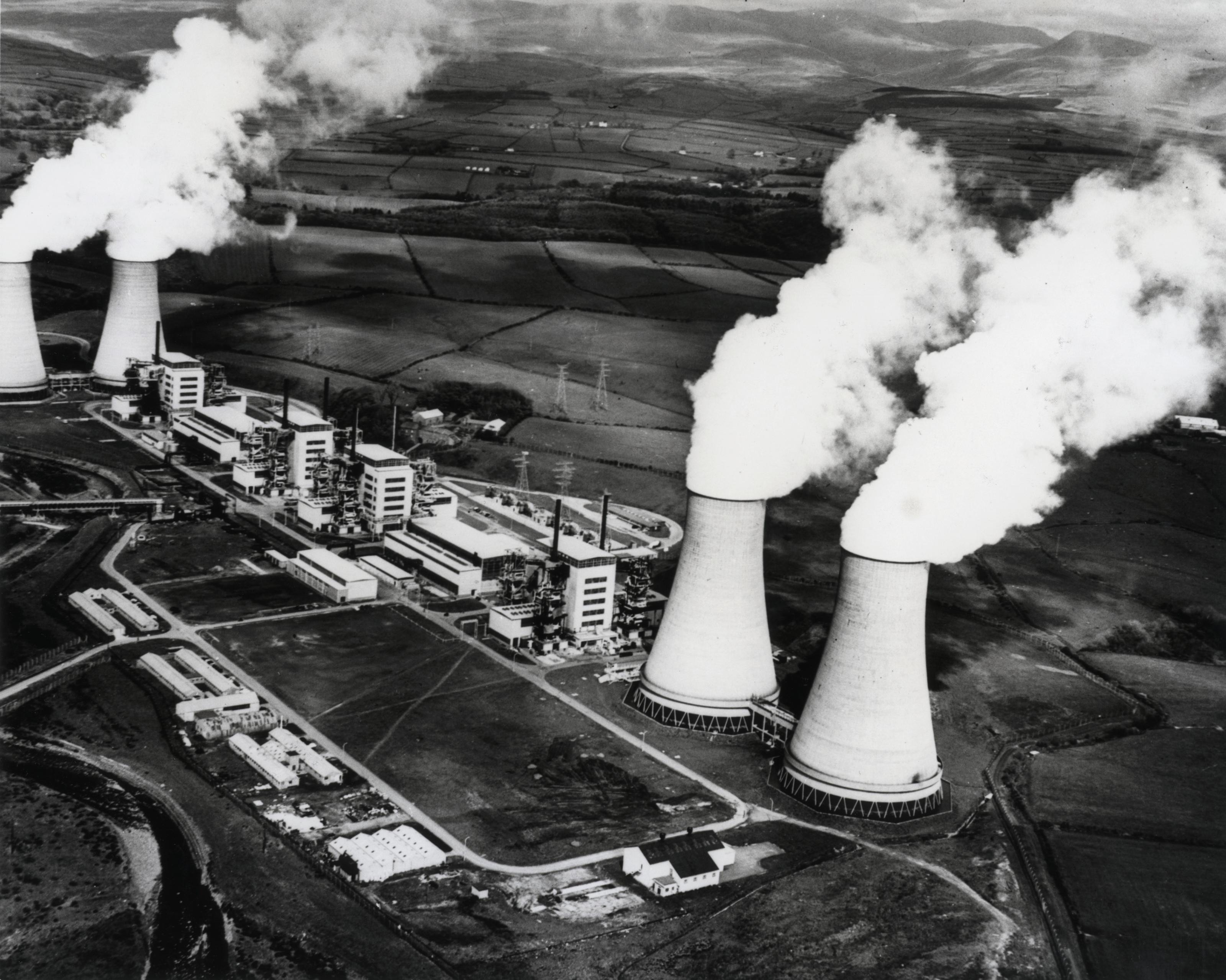
Calder Hall, United Kingdom – The world's first industrial-scale nuclear power station. The four reactors have two shared turbine halls between 1 & 2 and between 3 & 4.

Calder Hall was first connected to the grid on 27 August 1956 and officially opened by Queen Elizabeth II on 17 October 1956. It was the world's first nuclear power station to provide electricity on a commercial scale to a public grid. (Note: A 5 MWe experimental reactor at Obninsk in the Soviet Union had been connected to the public supply in 1954, though the main task was to carry out experimental studies, and it was on a small scale.)

The Calder Hall design was codenamed PIPPA (Pressurised Pile Producing Power and Plutonium) by the UKAEA to denote the plant's dual commercial and military role. Construction started in 1953. Calder Hall had four Magnox reactors capable of generating 60 MWe (net) of power each, reduced to 50 MWe in 1973. The reactors also supplied steam to the whole site for process and other purposes. The reactors were supplied by UKAEA, the turbines by C. A. Parsons and Company, and the civil engineering contractor was Taylor Woodrow Construction.

In its early life Calder Hall primarily produced weapons-grade plutonium, with two fuel loads per year; electricity production was a secondary purpose. From 1964 it was mainly used on commercial fuel cycles; in April 1995 the UK Government announced that all production of plutonium for weapons purposes had ceased.

The station was closed on 31 March 2003, the first reactor having been in use for nearly 47 years. decommissioning started in 2005. The plant should be in save storage, called "care and maintenance" (C&M), by 2027 or later.

Calder Hall had four cooling towers, each 88 metres (289 ft) in height, which were highly visible landmarks. Plans for a museum involving renovating Calder Hall and preserving the towers were formulated, but the costs were too high. The cooling towers were demolished by controlled implosions on 29 September 2007. A period of 12 weeks was required to remove asbestos in the towers' rubble.

=== Windscale Advanced Gas Cooled Reactor (WAGR) ===
The WAGR was a prototype for the UK's second generation of reactors, the advanced gas-cooled reactor or AGR, which followed on from the Magnox stations. The station had a rated thermal output of approximately 100 MW and 30 MWe. The WAGR spherical containment, known colloquially as the "golfball", is one of the iconic buildings on the site. Construction was carried out by Mitchell Construction and completed in 1962. This reactor was shut down in 1983, and was subsequently the subject of a pilot project to demonstrate techniques for safely decommissioning a nuclear reactor.

=== Thermal Oxide Reprocessing Plant (THORP) ===
Between 1977 and 1978 an inquiry, chaired by Mr Justice Parker, was held into an application by BNFL for outline planning permission to build a new plant to reprocess irradiated oxide nuclear fuel from both UK and foreign reactors. The inquiry was used to answer three questions:

"1. Should oxide fuel from United Kingdom reactors be reprocessed in this country at all; whether at Windscale or elsewhere?
2. If yes, should such reprocessing be carried on at Windscale?
3. If yes, should the reprocessing plant be about double the estimated site required to handle United Kingdom oxide fuels and be used as to the spare capacity, for reprocessing foreign fuels?"

The result of the inquiry was that the new plant, the Thermal Oxide Reprocessing Plant (THORP) was given the go ahead in 1978, although it did not go into operation until 1994.

In 2003, it was announced that THORP would be closed in 2010, but this was later extended to 2018 to allow completion of agreed contracts. Originally predicted to make profits for BNFL of £500 million, by 2003 it had made losses of over £1 billion. THORP was closed for almost two years from 2005, after a leak had been undetected for nine months. Production eventually restarted at the plant in early 2008, but almost immediately had to be put on hold again, as an underwater lift that takes the fuel for reprocessing needed to be repaired.

On 14 November 2018 it was announced that operations had ended at THORP. The facility will be used to store spent nuclear fuel until the 2070s.

=== Highly Active Liquor Evaporation and Storage ===
Highly Active Liquor Evaporation and Storage (HALES) is a department at Sellafield. It conditions nuclear waste streams from the Magnox and Thorp reprocessing plants, prior to transfer to the Waste Vitrification Plant.

=== Waste Vitrification Plant ===
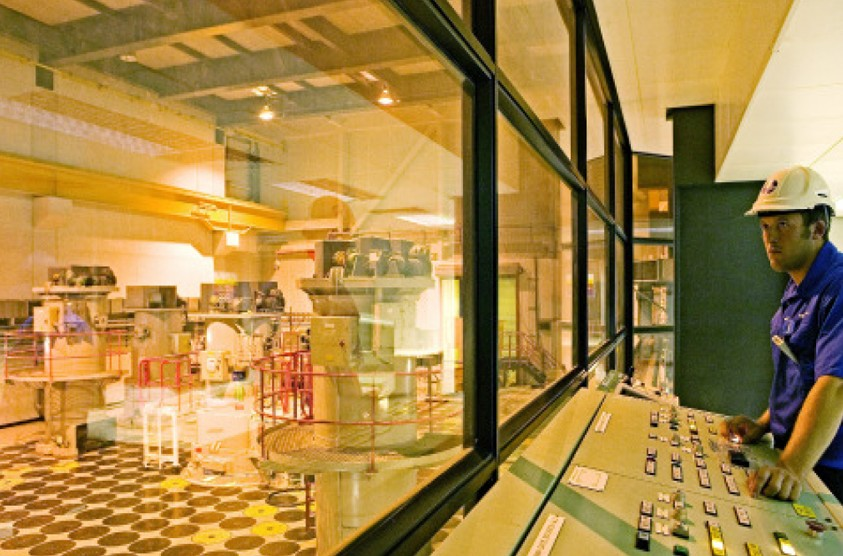
Sellafield Waste Vitrification Plant

In 1990 the Waste Vitrification Plant (WVP), which seals high-level radioactive waste in glass, was opened. In this plant, liquid wastes are mixed with glass and melted in a furnace, which when cooled forms a solid block of glass.

The plant has three process lines and is based on the French AVM procedure. The plant was built with two lines, commissioned during 1989, with a third added in 2002. The principal item is an inductively heated melting furnace, in which the calcined waste is mixed with glass frit (fragments of smashed glass) The melt is poured into waste containers which are welded shut, allowed to cool slowly in a heater to facilitate a monolithic product (single large block of glass with minimal cracks or small crystals to facilitate long term stability), their outsides decontaminated in WVP, then again in the connected building Residue Export Facility (REF), and then placed in the air-cooled Vitrified Product Store.

This storage consists of 800 vertical storage tubes each capable of storing ten containers. The total storage capacity is 8000 containers, and 6000 containers had been stored by 2016.

Vitrification should ensure safe storage of waste in the UK for the medium- to long-term, with the objective of eventual placement in a deep geological repository. As of 2007 studies of durability and leach rates were being carried out.

=== Sellafield MOX Plant ===
Construction of the Sellafield MOX fuel Plant (SMP) was completed in 1997, and operations began in October 2001. Although designed with a production capacity of 120 tonnes/year, the plant achieved a total output of only 5 tonnes during its first five years of operation. Consequently, in 2008 orders for the plant had to be fulfilled at COGEMA in France, and the plant was reported in the media as "failed" with a total construction and operating cost by 2009 of £1.2 billion. On 12 May 2010, an agreement was reached with existing Japanese customers on future MOX supplies.

In July 2010 Areva was contracted to design and supply a new rod line to improve reliability and production rate. However, on 3 August 2011 the Nuclear Decommissioning Authority announced that the MOX Plant would close, due to the loss of the Japanese orders following the Fukushima Daiichi nuclear disaster. The NDA stated that the plant "had suffered many years of disappointing performance", and it was reported that the total cost to date had been £1.4 billion. Although Japanese orders for MOX fuel re-commenced on 17 April 2013, they were supplied from France by COGEMA.

=== Enhanced Actinide Removal Plant (EARP) ===
Since its early days, Sellafield has discharged low-level radioactive waste into the sea, using a flocculation process to remove radioactivity from liquid effluent before discharge. Metals dissolved in acidic effluents were made to produce a metal hydroxide flocculant precipitate following the addition of ammonium hydroxide. The suspension was then transferred to settling tanks where the precipitate would settle out, and the remaining clarified liquid, or supernate, would be discharged to the Irish Sea. As an improvement to that process, in 1994 the Enhanced Actinide Removal Plant (EARP) became operational. In EARP the effectiveness of the process is enhanced by the addition of reagents to remove the remaining soluble radioactive species. EARP was enhanced further in 2004 to further reduce the quantities of technetium-99 released to the environment.

=== Radioactive waste stores ===
Sellafield has several radioactive waste stores, mostly working on an interim basis while a deep geological repository plan is developed and implemented.

The stores include:

- Legacy Ponds and Silos – Storage of historic waste
- Sludge packaging plant – Treatment and interim storage of sludges from legacy ponds
- Sellafield product and residue store – Site store for plutonium and plutonium residues – The civil plutonium stockpile stood at 140 tonnes at the ending of reprocessing in 2022.
- Engineered drum stores – Site stores for plutonium-contaminated material
- Encapsulated product stores – Site stores for grouted wastes
- Vitrified product store – Vitrified high level waste

The UK's main Low Level Waste Repository for nuclear waste is 6 kilometres (3.7 mi) south east of Sellafield at Drigg. A paper published in 1989 said that 70% of the waste received at Drigg originated from Sellafield.

=== Fellside Power Station ===
Fellside Power Station is a 168 MWe CHP gas-fired power station adjacent to the Sellafield site, which it supplies with process and heating steam. It is run as Fellside Heat and Power Ltd, is wholly owned by Sellafield Ltd and is operated & managed by PX Ltd. It was built in 1993, in anticipation of the closure of the Calder Hall generating station, which supplied these services.

The station uses three General Electric Frame 6001B gas turbines, with power entering the National Grid via a 132 kV transformer. The turbines at Fellside are normally natural gas fired but are also able to run on distillate (diesel) fuel.

In May 2023, Sellafield Ltd removed a set of large, now redundant steel tanks at the Fellside power station. Their original purpose has been fulfilled by newer tanks.

=== National Nuclear Laboratory headquarters ===
The Central Laboratory at Sellafield is the headquarters of the National Nuclear Laboratory (NNL). It supports newly built reactors, operation of reactors, operations of fuel processing plants and decommissioning and clean-up. The NNL's Central Laboratory can undertake a wide range of radioactive and non-radioactive experimental programmes.

It undertakes a wide range of analytical services, with customers ranging from Government and the NDA to site licence companies, utilities, nuclear specialists and universities. Smaller experiments are undertaken at Sellafield and larger experiments and rigs are assembled off site, in non-radioactive areas prior to active testing in a radioactive setting.

== Sellafield and the local community ==
=== Employment ===
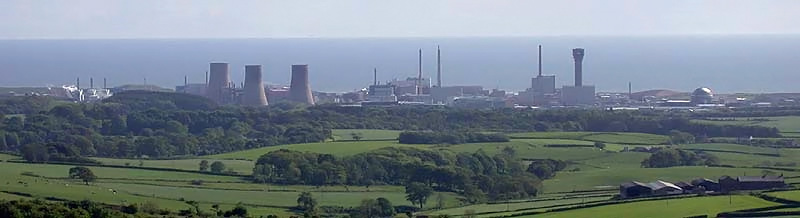
2005 view of the site, with the Calder Hall cooling towers still standing. The Irish Sea is in the background.

Sellafield directly employs around 10,000 people and is one of the two largest non-governmental employers in West Cumbria (along with BAE Systems at Barrow-in-Furness), with approximately 90% of the employees coming from West Cumbria.

Because of the increase in local unemployment following any run down of Sellafield operations, the Nuclear Decommissioning Authority (and HMG) is concerned that this needs to be managed.

=== West Cumbria Sites Stakeholder Group (WCSSG) ===
The WCSSG is an independent body whose role is to provide public scrutiny of the nuclear industry in West Cumbria.

The WCSSG replaced the Sellafield Local Liaison Committee (SLLC) to cover all the nuclear licensed sites in the area, not just Sellafield Site, and this change is intended to emphasise the importance of engagement with the community; encouraging input in discussions and consultations from all stakeholders. With the change of organisation and ownership of licensed sites, the WCSSG has consequently changed and re-organised its sub-committees, but the objective remains the same. The meetings of the main group and its sub-committees are held in West Cumbria and are open to the public.

=== Sellafield Visitor Centre ===
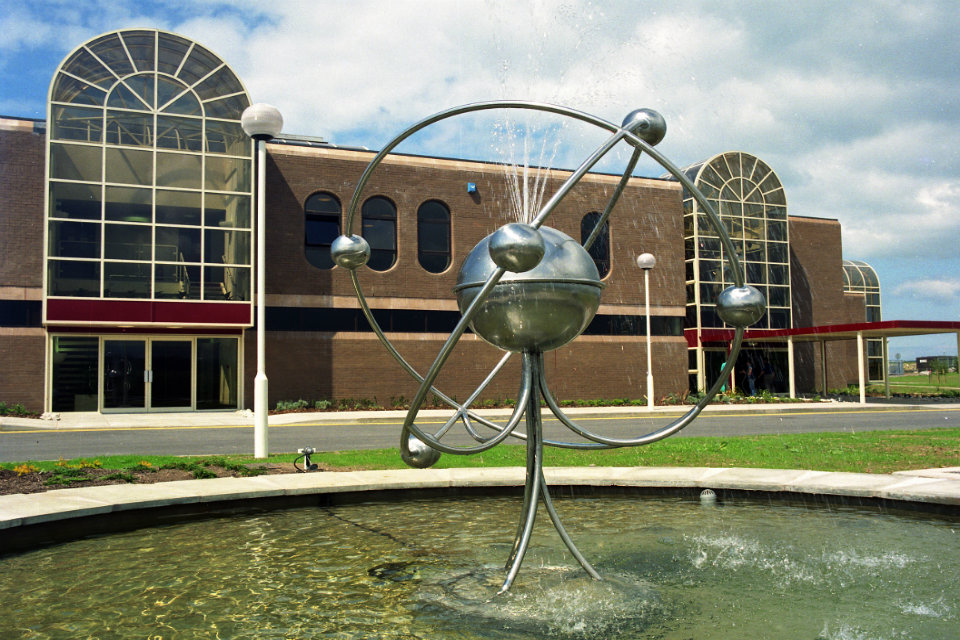
The Sellafield Visitor Centre in the late 1980s; it is now demolished.

The £5 million centre was opened by Prince Philip on 6 June 1988, and at its peak it attracted an average of 1,000 people per day. However, despite a large refurbishment in 1995, and the transfer of creative control to the Science Museum in 2002, its popularity deteriorated, prompting the change from a tourist attraction to a conference facility in 2008. This facility completely closed in 2015, was briefly used by the Civil Nuclear Constabulary as a training facility, and as of 2019 the building has been demolished. The story of Sellafield is now being told through a permanent exhibition at the Beacon Museum in Whitehaven.

== Incidents ==
=== Radiological releases ===
Between 1950 and 2000, there were 21 serious incidents or accidents involving off-site radiological releases that warranted a rating on the International Nuclear Event Scale, one at level 5, five at level 4 and fifteen at level 3. During the 1950s and 1960s there were protracted periods of known, deliberate discharges to the atmosphere of plutonium and irradiated uranium oxide particulates.

In the effort to build the independent British nuclear weapon in the 1940s and 1950s, diluted radioactive waste was discharged by pipeline into the Irish Sea. Greenpeace claims that the Irish Sea remains one of the most heavily contaminated seas in the world because of these discharges. Ocean scientist David Assinger has challenged this general suggestion, and cites the Dead Sea as the most radioactive sea in the world. The Convention for the Protection of the Marine Environment of the North-East Atlantic (OSPAR Convention) reports an estimated 200 kg (440 lb) of plutonium has been deposited in the marine sediments of the Irish Sea.

Most of the area's long-lived radioactive technetium came from the reprocessing of spent nuclear fuel at the Sellafield facility. Technetium-99 is a radioactive element which is produced by nuclear fuel reprocessing, and also as a by-product of medical facilities (for example Ireland is responsible for the discharge of approximately 11 grams or 6.78 gigabecquerels of technetium-99 each year despite not having a nuclear industry). Because it is almost uniquely produced by nuclear fuel reprocessing, technetium-99 is an important element as part of the OSPAR Convention since it provides a good tracer for discharges into the sea. In itself, the technetium discharges do not represent a significant radiological hazard, and in 2000, a study noted "...that in the most recently reported dose estimates for the most exposed Sellafield group of seafood consumers (FSA/SEPA 2000), the contributions from technetium-99 and actinide nuclides from Sellafield (<100 μSv) was less than that from ^{210}Po attributable to discharges from the Whitehaven phosphate fertiliser plant and probably less than the dose from naturally occurring background levels of ^{210}Po."

Because of the need to comply with the OSPAR Convention, British Nuclear Group commissioned a new process in which technetium-99 was removed from the waste stream and vitrified in glass blocks in the new Vitrification Plant on site.

Discharges into the sea of radioactive effluents – mainly caesium-137 – from Sellafield amounted to 5200 TBq during the peak year, 1975.

In 1983 radioactive discharges to sea containing ruthenium and rhodium-106, both beta-emitting isotopes, resulted in temporary warnings against swimming in the sea along a 10-mile (16 km) stretch of coast between St. Bees and Eskmeals. BNFL received a fine of £10,000 for this discharge. 1983 was also the year in which Yorkshire Television produced a documentary "Windscale: The Nuclear Laundry", which claimed that the low levels of radioactivity that are associated with waste streams from nuclear plants such as Sellafield did pose a non-negligible risk.

=== Windscale fire ===
The Windscale fire of October 1957 stands as the most severe incident in the history of the Sellafield site. This event, rated at level 5 out of 7 on the International Nuclear Event Scale, ranks among the world's most significant nuclear accidents, with only three events having received higher ratings. The incident involved a fire in the Windscale Piles, facilities used for plutonium production, which resulted in a substantial release of radioactive fallout into the environment. The consequences of this event were far-reaching. Surrounding agricultural areas, particularly dairy farms, experienced radioactive contamination. Of notable concern was the release of significant quantities of the iodine-131 isotope, a known contributor to thyroid cancer risk. The scale and impact of this incident have made it a subject of ongoing study and discussion in the field of nuclear safety.

The UK government downplayed the events for some time and the original reports on the fire were subject to heavy censorship, as Prime Minister Harold Macmillan feared the incident would harm British-American nuclear relations. It has since come to light that small but significant amounts of the highly dangerous radioactive isotope polonium-210 were also released, though knowledge of this was excluded from government reports until 1983.

The Windscale fire remains Britain's worst nuclear accident. The release would have been much worse if it had not been for the filter at the top of the Pile's exhaust chimney.

A 1988 UK government estimate stated that 100 people "probably" died as a result of exposure to the radioactive fallout from the Windscale fire. In 2007, the 50th anniversary of the fire, an academic study concluded that the amount of radioactive fallout released was twice the existing estimates and it spread further east than thought. The study estimated that 240 people were given cancer in the surrounding areas, and that 100 of these cancer cases were fatal. However, later epidemiological studies failed to find any such increase. A 2024 study ascribed the lack of any increase in detected cancer rates as potentially being due to the prompt ban on consumption of milk from the area, and criticised previous estimates as lacking a firm evidentiary basis.

=== Plutonium Recovery Plant criticality ===
On 24 August 1970, a criticality incident occurred in the Plutonium Recovery Plant.

The plant recovered plutonium from miscellaneous sources and was considered tightly controlled. Plutonium was dissolved and transferred into a solvent extraction column through a transfer vessel and backflow trap. Unexpectedly, 2.15 kg (4.7 lb) of plutonium had accumulated in the transfer vessel and backflow trap and become just sub-critical. As an organic solvent was added to the aqueous solution in the vessel, the organic and aqueous phases separated out with the organic layer on top. This solvent extracted plutonium from the aqueous solution with sufficient concentration and geometry to create a criticality.

Two plant workers were exposed to radiation.

=== First Generation Magnox Storage Pond Deterioration ===
Due to algae forming in the pond and a buildup of radioactive sludge, it was impossible to determine exactly how much radioactive waste was stored in the FGMSP. British authorities had not been able to provide the Euratom inspectors with precise data and the European Commission took action against Great Britain in the European Court of Justice in 2004. According to Greenpeace there was an expected 1300 kg of plutonium, 400 kg of which was in mud sediments.

Radiation around the pool could get so high that a person was not allowed to stay more than 2 minutes, seriously affecting decommissioning. The pool was not watertight; time and weather had created cracks in the concrete, letting contaminated water leak. In 2014 photographs of the storage ponds were leaked to the media, showing they were in poor condition with cracked concrete, vegetation growing amongst machinery and seagulls bathing in the pools.

=== MOX fuel quality data falsification ===
The MOX Demonstration Facility was a small-scale plant to produce commercial quality MOX fuel for light water reactors. The plant was commissioned between 1992 and 1994, and until 1999 produced fuel for use in Switzerland, Germany and Japan.

In 1999 it was discovered that the plant's staff had been falsifying quality assurance data since 1996. A Nuclear Installations Inspectorate (NII) investigation concluded four of the five work-shifts were involved in the falsification, though only one worker admitted to falsifying data, and that "the level of control and supervision ... had been virtually non-existent.". The NII stated that the safety performance of the fuel was not affected as there was also a primary automated check on the fuel. Nevertheless, "in a plant with the proper safety culture, the events described in this report could not have happened" and there were systematic failures in management.

BNFL had to pay compensation to the Japanese customer, Kansai Electric, and take back a flawed shipment of MOX fuel from Japan. BNFL's Chief Executive John Taylor resigned, after initially resisting resignation when the NII's damning report was published.

=== Plutonium records discrepancy ===
On 17 February 2005, the UK Atomic Energy Authority reported that 29.6 kilograms (65 lb) of plutonium was unaccounted for in auditing records at the Sellafield nuclear fuel reprocessing plant. The operating company, the British Nuclear Group, described this as a discrepancy in paper records and not as indicating any physical loss of material. They pointed out that the error amounted to about 0.5%, whereas International Atomic Energy Agency regulations permit a discrepancy up to 1% as the amount of plutonium recovered from the reprocessing process never precisely matches the pre-process estimates.

The inventories in question were accepted as satisfactory by Euratom, the relevant regulatory agency.

=== Waste Vitrification Plant sabotage ===
In 2000, wires on six robotic arms that moved vitrified glass blocks were deliberately cut by staff, putting the vitrification plant out of operation for three days.

=== 2005 THORP plant leak ===
On 19 April 2005, around 83,000 litres (18,000 imperial gallons; 22,000 US gallons) of hot nitric acid containing dissolved radioisotopes was discovered to have leaked in the THORP reprocessing plant from a cracked pipe into a huge stainless steel-lined concrete sump built to contain leaks.

A discrepancy between the amount of material entering and exiting the THORP processing system had first been noted in August 2004. Operations staff did not discover the leak until safeguards staff reported the discrepancies. Nineteen tonnes of uranium and 160 kg (350 lb) of plutonium dissolved in nitric acid has been pumped from the sump vessel into a holding tank.

No radiation was released to the environment, and no one was injured by the incident, but because of the large escape of radioactivity to the secondary containment the incident was given an International Nuclear Event Scale level 3 categorisation. Sellafield Limited was fined £500,000 for breaching health and safety law. In January 2007, Sellafield was given consent to restart THORP.

=== Organ removal inquiry ===
In 2007, an inquiry was launched into the removal of tissue from a total of 65 dead nuclear workers, some of whom worked at Sellafield. It has been alleged that the tissue was removed without seeking permission from the relatives of the late workers. Michael Redfern QC was appointed to lead the investigation. At the same time The Observer revealed that official documents showed that during the 1960s volunteer workers at Sellafield had participated in secret Cold War experiments to assess the biological effect of exposure to radioactive substances, such as from ingesting caesium-134.

The inquiry final report was published in November 2010, reporting that "...body parts had been removed between 1961 and 1992. The deaths of 76 workers – 64 from Sellafield and 12 from other UK nuclear plants – were examined, although the scope of the inquiry was later significantly widened." The person behind this scheme was Dr Geoffrey Schofield, who became BNFL's Company chief medical officer, and who died in 1985. Sellafield staff did not breach any legal obligation, did not consider their actions untoward, and published the scientific information obtained in peer-reviewed scientific journals. It was the hospital pathologists, who were profoundly ignorant of the law, who breached the Human Tissue Act 1961 by giving Sellafield human organs, without any consents, under an informal arrangement.

=== 2023 hacking and radioactive leak ===
In December 2023, it emerged that Sellafield was the victim of cyber hacking by groups closely linked to Russia and China It was first reported by UK newspaper The Guardian, it is unknown if the malware has yet been eradicated. It is still unknown to the extent of the attack and what the long term effects are.

The Guardian has since reported that the Sellafield site has a "worsening leak from a huge silo of radioactive waste" that is likely to continue until 2050. The silo in question is the Magnox swarf storage silo and it was reported that scientists were still trying to estimate the risk to the public using statistical modelling.

== Health studies in Cumbria and Seascale ==
In 1983, the Medical Officer of West Cumbria, is said by Paul Foot to have announced that cancer fatality rates were lower around the nuclear plant than elsewhere in Great Britain. In the early 1990s, concern was raised in the UK about apparent clusters of leukaemia near nuclear facilities.

A 1997 Ministry of Health report stated that children living close to Sellafield had twice as much plutonium in their teeth as children living more than 100 miles (160 km) away. Health Minister Melanie Johnson said the quantities were minute and "presented no risk to public health". This claim, according to a book written by Stephanie Cooke, was challenged by Professor Eric Wright, an expert on blood disorders at the University of Dundee, who said that even microscopic amounts of plutonium might cause cancer.

Studies carried out by the Committee on Medical Aspects of Radiation in the Environment (COMARE) in 2003 reported no evidence of raised childhood cancer in general around nuclear power plants, but did report an excess of leukaemia (cancer of the blood or bone) and non-Hodgkin's lymphoma (NHL, a blood cancer) near two other nuclear installations including Sellafield, the Atomic Weapons Establishment Burghfield and UKAEA Dounreay. COMARE's conclusion was that "the excesses around Sellafield and Dounreay are unlikely to be due to chance, although there is not at present a convincing explanation for them". In earlier reports COMARE had suggested that "a mechanism involving infection may be a significant factor." The clusters have disappeared in the early 1990s.

The main finding of the new report was that there was no significantly increased leukaemia and non-Hodgkin lymphoma around Sellafield or Dounreay for the period 1991‐2006

— Dr Chris Gibson, chair of COMARE

In a study published in the British Journal of Cancer, which also did not find an increase in any other cancers other than Leukemia, the authors of which attempted to quantify the effect population mixing might have on the Seascale leukaemia cluster. In the analysis of childhood leukaemia/NHL in Cumbria, excluding Seascale, they noted that if both parents were born outside the Cumbrian area (incomers), there was a significantly higher rate of leukaemia/NHL in their children. 1181 children were born in the village of Seascale between 1950 and 1989, in children aged 1–14 during this period, the Seascale cluster of 6 observed cases of NHL were noted. Two similarly aged children, born between 1950 and 1989, outside Seascale were also diagnosed with ALL/NHL before the end of 1992. The origin of birth of 11 of the 16 parents of these eight children was known, and found to be; 3 had parents born outside Cumbria and 3 had one parent born outside the UK. The study's authors strongly supported the hypothesis that the risk of ALL/NHL, in particular in the younger age group, increases with increased exposure to population mixing during gestation or early in life. Although they determined that the exact mechanism by which it causes these malignancies, apart from Kinlen's infection aetiology that was mentioned, remained unknown, concluding that the possibility of additional risk factors in Seascale remains.

In an examination of all causes of stillbirth and infant mortality in Cumbria taken as a whole, between 1950 and 1993, 4,325 stillbirths, 3,430 neonatal death and 1,569 lethal congenital anomalies, occurred among 287,993 births. Overall, results did not infer an increased risk of still birth or neonatal death in Cumbria, the rate of these negative outcomes were largely in line with the British baseline rate. However, there was a cautioned connection between a small excess of increased risk of death from lethal congenital anomalies and proximity to municipal waste incinerators and chemical waste crematoriums being noted. With two examples of the latter crematoriums operating in both Barrow-in-Furness and further afield at Carlisle, crematoriums which may have emitted various chemical dioxins during their operation.

== Objections to reprocessing ==
=== Republic of Ireland ===
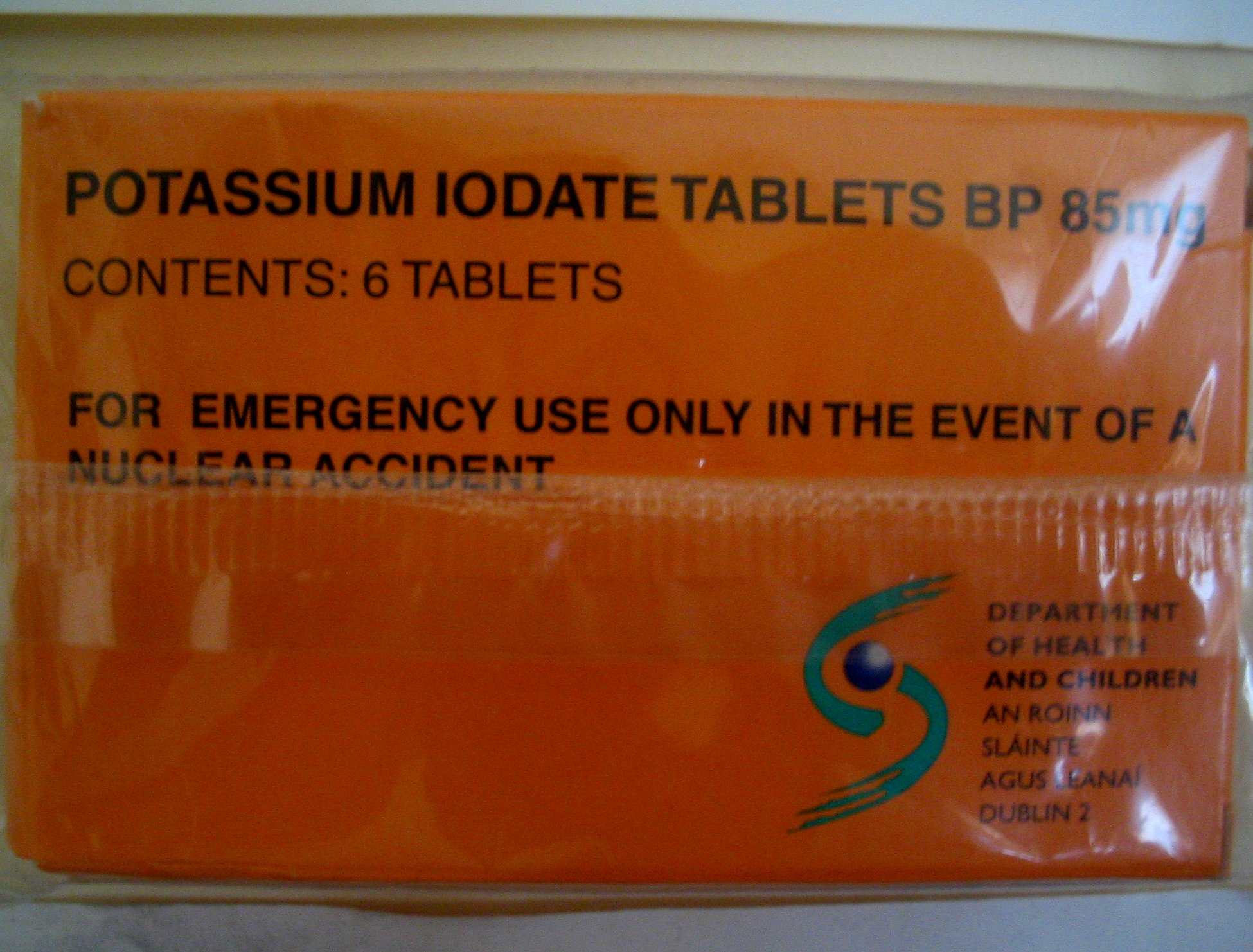
An unopened box of potassium iodate tablets

Potassium iodate tablets were distributed to every household in Ireland in the wake of 9/11 in case of a terror attack on reprocessing plants and nuclear power stations in Britain. Upon later expert Irish examination in 2007, this was found not to have been justified, particularly because activity at Sellafield does not generate radio-iodine isotopes that could ever necessitate taking of the tablets. The Irish Department of Health advised in 2021 that the tablets could be disposed of with municipal waste.

Sellafield has been a matter of consternation in Ireland, with the Irish Government and some of the population concerned at the risk that such a facility may pose to the country. The Irish government has made formal complaints about the facility, and in 2006 came to an agreement with the British Government about the matter, as part of which the Radiological Protection Institute of Ireland and the Garda Síochána (the Irish police force) are now allowed access to the site.

=== Isle of Man ===
The Government of the Isle of Man has also registered protests due to the risk posed by radioactive contamination. The Manx government has called for the site to be shut down.

The Irish and Manx governments have collaborated on this issue, and brought it to the attention of the British-Irish Council.

=== Norway ===
Similar objections to those held by the Irish government have been voiced by the Norwegian government since 1997. Monitoring undertaken by the Norwegian Radiation Protection Authority has shown that the prevailing sea currents transport radioactive materials leaked into the sea at Sellafield along the entire coast of Norway and water samples have shown up to tenfold increases in such materials as technetium-99. The Norwegian government is also seeking closure of the facility.

== Proposal to establish adjacent power station ==
In February 2009, NuGeneration (NuGen), a consortium of GDF Suez, Iberdrola and Scottish and Southern Energy (SSE), announced plans to build a new nuclear power station of up to 3.6 GW capacity adjacent to Sellafield. In October 2009, NuGen purchased an option to acquire land around Sellafield from the NDA for £70 million.

In October 2010, the UK government announced that Sellafield was one of the eight possible sites it considered suitable for future nuclear power stations. In June 2011, the government confirmed the suitability of the site, and hoped an electricity generating company would choose to build a power station near Sellafield at Moorside by 2025. In 2018, this project was terminated when Toshiba decided to close Nugen and withdraw from nuclear power plant construction in the UK.

In June 2020, the UK government along with EDF together with Rolls-Royce announced that Sellafield has been chosen as a site which will house various types of clean nuclear technologies such as EDF's leading EPR reactor together with Rolls-Royce SMR reactors. The site would serve to produce both electricity and clean hydrogen. EDF has stated plans to construct a twin-EPR station similar in design to Hinkley Point C and Sizewell C. The site will house some of the 16 planned 440 Mwe SMRs to be deployed across the UK.

== Sellafield in popular culture ==
Kraftwerk mentions Sellafield in the intro of the 1991 version of the song "Radioactivity" together with Chernobyl, Harrisburg and Hiroshima. On their 2005 live album Kraftwerk preface a live performance of "Radioactivity" with a vocoder voice announcing: "Sellafield 2 will produce 7.5 tons of plutonium every year. 1.5 kilogram of plutonium make a nuclear bomb. Sellafield 2 will release the same amount of radioactivity into the environment as Chernobyl every 4.5 years. One of these radioactive substances, krypton-85, will cause death and skin cancer."

The Windscale fire of 1957 at the Sellafield site was the subject of a 1983 documentary by Yorkshire Television, entitled Windscale – the Nuclear Laundry. It alleged that the clusters of leukaemia in children around Windscale were attributable to the radioactive fallout from the fire.

The Windscale fire has also been the subject of three BBC documentaries. The first, shown originally in 1990, was entitled Our Reactor is on Fire, and was part of the Inside Story series. A 30-minute drama-documentary about the incident was then released in 1999 as part of the BBC's Disaster series; the episode was entitled Atomic Inferno – The Windscale Fire and was later released on DVD. During the 50-year anniversary of the incident in 2007, another documentary was released by the BBC entitled Windscale: Britain's Biggest Nuclear Disaster. All three of these documentaries include interviews with key plant workers and Tom Tuohy, the deputy general manager of Windscale at the time of the accident and the man who risked his life to extinguish the flames.

In the 1985 BBC radio series Nineteen Ninety-Four, a comedic parody of George Orwell's Nineteen Eighty-Four, civil servant Edward Wilson discovers that Cumbria, which the governing Department of the Environment had claimed had witnessed widespread devastation via an unspecified natural or manmade disaster in 1990, had been converted into Sellingfield, a secret socially engineered community built on consumerism, advertising and market research.

Fallout, a 2006 drama shown on the Irish national TV station RTÉ, based on the false premise that parts of Ireland would need to be evacuated following a serious accident at Sellafield, showed that following the accident there are evacuation riots, societal collapse and widespread health impacts. Dr Ann McGarry, chief executive of the Radiological Protection Institute of Ireland, said: "The scenario envisaged in the programme is not realistic and grossly exaggerates the amount of radioactivity that could reach Ireland. The RPII cannot envisage any realistic scenario that would cause the radiation levels in Ireland to reach the concentrations as what was depicted in the drama". The Radiological Protection Institute of Ireland (RPII) said that "the scenario as depicted in tonight's RTÉ drama, Fallout, could not happen. The RPII, who viewed the drama...has analysed the scenario as depicted and has concluded that it is not possible for such an accident to occur in Sellafield."

A 2015 BBC Four documentary, Britain's Nuclear Secrets: Inside Sellafield, examined the various radiation leaks and incidents that have occurred at Sellafield over the years and the health risks that have arisen as a result.

In 2016, Sellafield featured in an episode of the BBC series Panorama (TV series). The 30-minute documentary documented the many dangerous accidents and incidents that have occurred at the site over the years, and featured interviews with a mysterious whistleblower.

The 2025 videogame Atomfall is set in an alternate history 1960s where the Windscale nuclear disasters turned much of the Lake District into a radioactive quarantine zone.

== Notable employees ==
- Derrick Bird, perpetrator of the 2010 Cumbria shootings. Bird worked at Sellafield until 1990, when he was sacked for a theft that resulted in him receiving a suspended 12-month prison sentence.

== See also ==
- Energy policy of the United Kingdom
- Energy use and conservation in the United Kingdom
- List of nuclear accidents
- List of nuclear reactors
- Nuclear power in the United Kingdom
- Dorothy Gradden – Nuclear engineer from the UK

== Sources ==
- Ritchie, Berry (1997). The Good Builder: The John Laing Story. James & James.
