= Magnox Reprocessing Plant =

Nuclear reprocessing plant at Sellafield

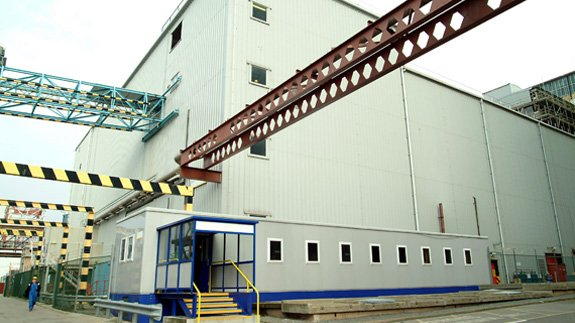
- Exterior view
- Official name: B205
- Country: England, United Kingdom
- Location: Cumbria, North West England
- Coordinates: 54.4155°N 3.5017°W
- Status: Shut down
- Construction began: 1960
- Commission date: 1964
- Decommission date: 17 July 2022
- Owner: Nuclear Decommissioning Authority
- Operators: UKAEA (1964-1971), BNFL (1971-2005), Sellafield Ltd (2005-present)
- Employees: (100)

External links
- Commons: Related media on Commons

The Magnox Reprocessing Plant is a former nuclear reprocessing facility at Sellafield in northern England, which operated from 1964 to 2022. The plant used PUREX chemistry (based on tributyl phosphate (TBP)) to extract plutonium and uranium from used nuclear fuel originating primarily from Magnox reactors. The plant was originally constructed and operated by the United Kingdom Atomic Energy Authority (UKAEA), but in 1971 control was transferred to British Nuclear Fuels Limited (BNFL). From 2005 the plant was operated by Sellafield Ltd.

== Operation ==
The plant was commissioned in 1964 as both a replacement for the UK's First Generation Reprocessing Plant, and to process spent fuel from the national fleet of Magnox reactors. The First generation Plant was then converted into a pre-handling plant for Magnox reprocessing and was recommissioned in 1969. In 1973, after both plants had been shut down for one year for maintenance, a violent reaction called a "blowback" occurred in the First Generation Plant which contaminated that plant and 34 workers with ruthenium-106. Following this event the First Generation Plant was permanently closed.

Over its lifetime, the Magnox plant handled over 55,000 tons of spent fuel from the UK's fleet of 11 Magnox plants as well as reprocessing Magnox fuel from Italy, Japan, and fast breeder fuel from Dounreay. In total, the plant has returned over 15,000 tons of uranium back into the fuel cycle. As of 2019, all Magnox reactors have now been retired from operation and defueled, with the last load of burnt-up Magnox fuel arrived at Sellafield in 2019.

B205 ceased operations on 17 July 2022, when it was announced that it had worked through the remaining spent Magnox fuel stockpiles. Thus completing its mission which spanned nearly 6 decades.

== Process ==
The process used mixer settlers as the basis of the plant operation. The unit comprised a set of mixing compartments where the solvent and aqueous liquids mixed. The mix then passed to an associated settler compartment where the solvent separated from the aqueous and forms two separate layers. These then left the settler compartment to the next mixer compartments. The solvent and aqueous flowed in opposite directions through the mixer settler stages (typically 8 or more), controlled by careful design of the transfer ports between the settler stages.

The task to extract usable uranium and plutonium began with a process known as "decanning" where the magnesium fuel can was separated from the inner uranium rod. The uranium rod was then sheared and dropped into a hot nitric acid solution within the Dissolver Cell. The aqueous stream was conditioned to the correct temperature and acidity and then passed to the first mixer settler system where fission products were separated from the uranium (U) and plutonium (Pu) by extraction of the U/Pu into the solvent phase comprising tri-butyl-phosphate in odourless kerosene. This had the effect of reducing the radiation levels in subsequent stages of the process and the resulting degradation of the solvents.

The solvent stream of U, Pu and remaining fission products passed to the critical mixer settler stages where the U and Pu were transferred into the aqueous phase, and fission products remained in the solvent phase. Separation of the U and Pu was achieved by adding a reductant, which caused the Pu, but not the U, to transfer into the aqueous phase. Once separated, further removal of fission products was undertaken by more mixer settler units. The U and Pu streams were then passed to evaporators to concentrate the U and Pu before further processing in other plants. The plant contributed the majority of liquid discharges from the Sellafield site; around 132 Terabecquerels (TBq) annually.

== Operation ==
=== 50 Not Out ===
In 2014 Sellafield Ltd celebrated 50 years of Magnox Reprocessing from 1964 to 2014. Called "50 not out" to highlight that the plant was not shutting down, the events related to this celebration spoke about the history of Magnox and Reprocessing as well as design choices that led to the use of magnesium cladding and overall information about the Magnox Operating Programme.

=== 2020 controlled shutdown ===
In 2020 due to coronavirus, Sellafield Ltd announced that the Magnox reprocessing plant will undergo a controlled shutdown to ensure less maintenance when it is eventually restarted. Whereas turning the facility off quickly in a response to reduced staff members on-site has a possibility to result in unnecessary maintenance or repair work. This will cause the closure date of the facility to be pushed back as no fuel will be reprocessed in this time.

=== Completion of reprocessing ===
Magnox fuel reprocessing ceased on 17 July 2022, when the reprocessing plant completed its last batch of fuel after 58 years of operation. A total of 55,000 tonnes of fuel had been processed during those years.

== See also ==
- Reprocessed uranium
- Mixer-settler
