= Dorothy Gradden =

Nuclear engineer from the UK

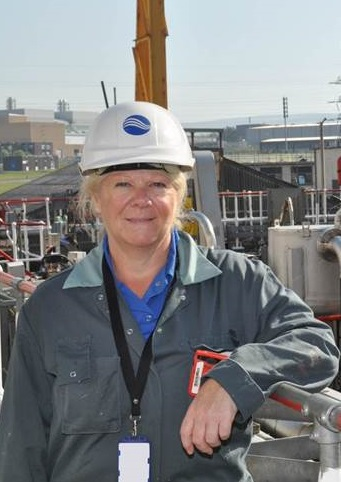
- Born: 1962 (age 63–64); Anfield
- Occupation: Nuclear engineer
- Employer: Sellafield Ltd
- Known for: Leading nuclear engineer

Dorothy Anne Gradden OBE (born 1962) is a British nuclear engineer for Sellafield Ltd. She leads the projects to decommission the large "legacy" ponds. These are nationally important projects as part of country's nuclear clean up operation on "Britain’s biggest and most hazardous nuclear waste site". In 2017 she was given an OBE and in 2019 the Nuclear Decommissioning Authority recognised her as a role model in their Safety and Wellbeing Awards.

== Life ==
Gradden was born in Anfield, Liverpool 1962. She was inspired to become an engineer by her physics teacher at The Belvedere Academy where she had a scholarship. She was the first of her school's students who wanted to be a professional engineer. She gained further sponsorship which enabled her to take nuclear engineering at Manchester University. There were 200 engineers on the course and Gradden and one other were the only women. Gradden's father died so her mother became her supporter and advisor.

She joined British Nuclear Fuels and became a project engineer. At one time she led the Hinckley C project but she then moved into the difficult task of decommissioning. She worked at Aldermaston's Atomic Weapons Establishment, Dounreay, Harwell's Atomic Energy Research Establishment, Winfrith, and Sellafield. At the end of 2012 she became Head of Programme for the Pile Fuel Storage Pond (PFSP).

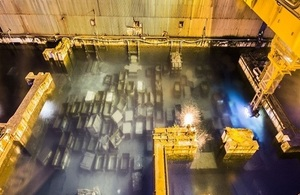
Nuclear waste in skips in ponds

In July 2016 she was asked to lead the decommissioning of the First Generation Magnox Storage Pond (FGMSP) whilst still retaining her responsibility for the PFSP. These are nationally important projects as part of country's nuclear clean up operation. The ponds are at the centre of what has been called "Britain’s biggest and most hazardous nuclear waste site". They go back to the 1950s and one of the ponds contains an estimated "1,500 tonnes of radioactive sludge" and 1,300 skips of sundry radioactive waste all submerged in a pond encased in algae encrusted concrete.

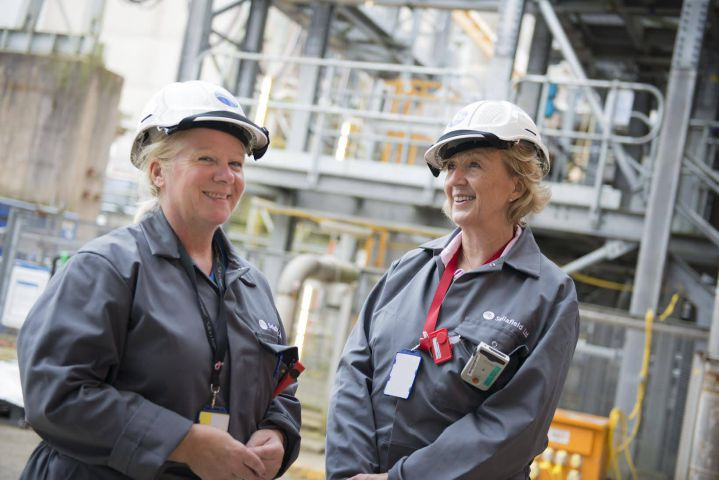
Dorothy Gradden with UK government minister Andrea Leadsom in 2015

In 2016 she was nominated for the WISE Campaign Hero Award.

In 2017 she was named in Queen's Birthday Honours list for "services to the nuclear industry". At the time she was Head of Programme Delivery, Legacy Ponds, Sellafield Limited. The following year she was able to announce that the first of the 1,200 skips of waste had been removed from the pond. They were being placed in larger containers and stored out of the pool but still on site. Removal of the skips makes it possible to deal with the remaining radioactive sludge.

In 2019 Gradden and Josephine Stabler were given role model awards during the first Safety and Wellbeing Awards organised by the Nuclear Decommissioning Authority.
