= Calder Hall nuclear power station =

UK nuclear power station (1956–2003)

Calder Hall Nuclear Power Station
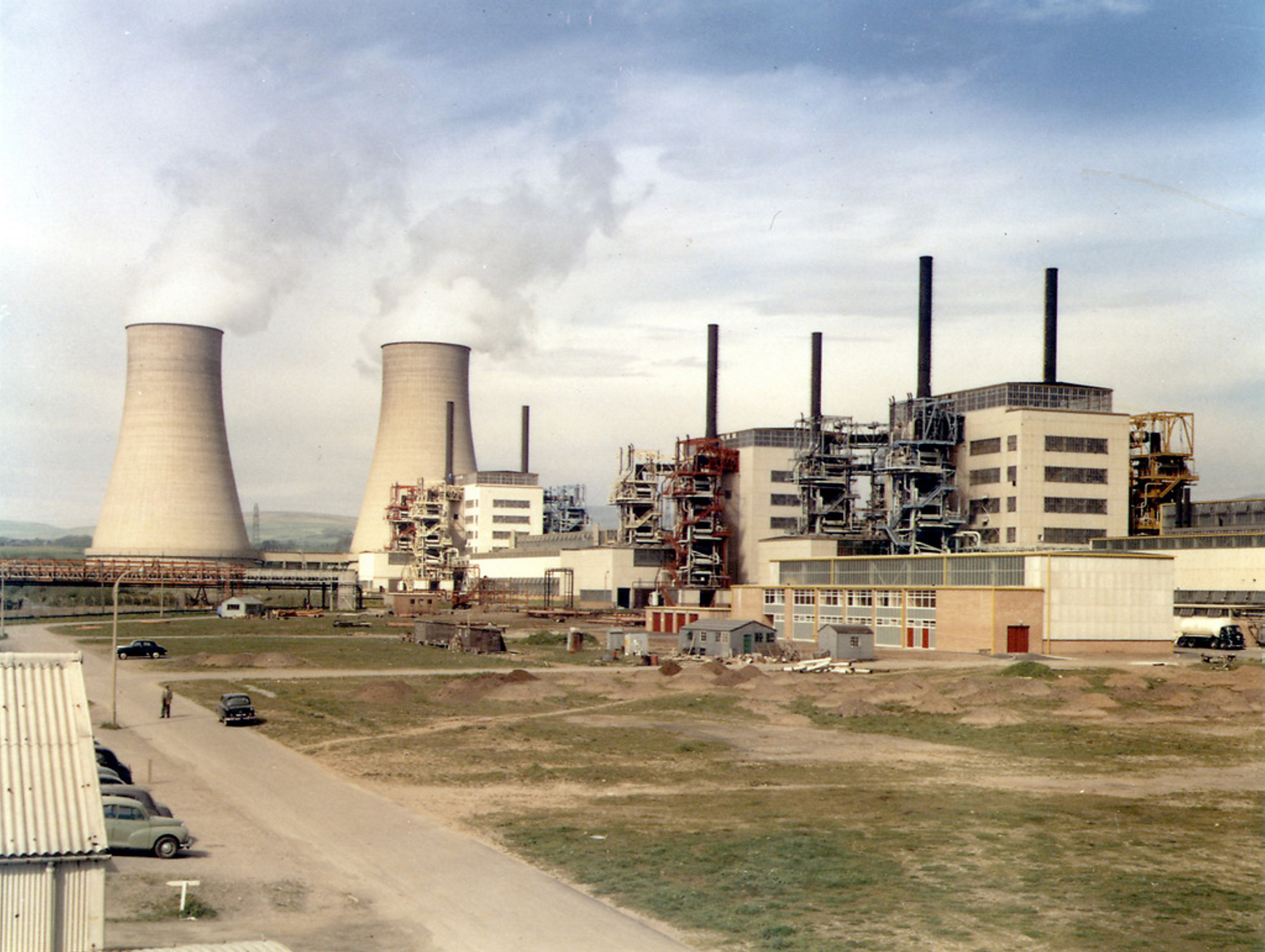
- Calder Hall nuclear power station, after opening
- Country: England
- Location: Seascale
- Coordinates: 54°25′07″N 03°29′29″W
- Status: In decommissioning
- Construction began: 1953
- Commission date: 1956
- Decommission date: 2003
- Owner: Nuclear Decommissioning Authority
- Operator: Sellafield Ltd

Thermal power station
- Primary fuel: Nuclear
- Cooling towers: 4 (demolished 2007)

Power generation
- Make and model: C.A. Parsons & Company; UKAEA
- Units decommissioned: 4 x 60 MWe
- Nameplate capacity: 240 MWe
- Capacity factor: 79%
- Annual net output: 360 GWh

External links
- Commons: Related media on Commons

Calder Hall Nuclear Power Station is a former Magnox nuclear power station on the Sellafield site in Cumbria in North West England. Calder Hall was the first full-scale nuclear power station to enter operation in the World, and was the sister plant to the Chapelcross plant in Scotland. Both were commissioned and originally operated by the United Kingdom Atomic Energy Authority. The primary purpose of both plants was to produce weapons-grade plutonium for the UK's nuclear weapons programme, but they also generated electrical power for the National Grid.

Decommissioning by Sellafield Ltd started in 2005. The site is partially demolished and is expected that only the reactor cores and associated radiation shielding will remain by 2027, when it will enter a period of extended care and maintenance using the "safestore" principle, before final demolition.

== Description ==
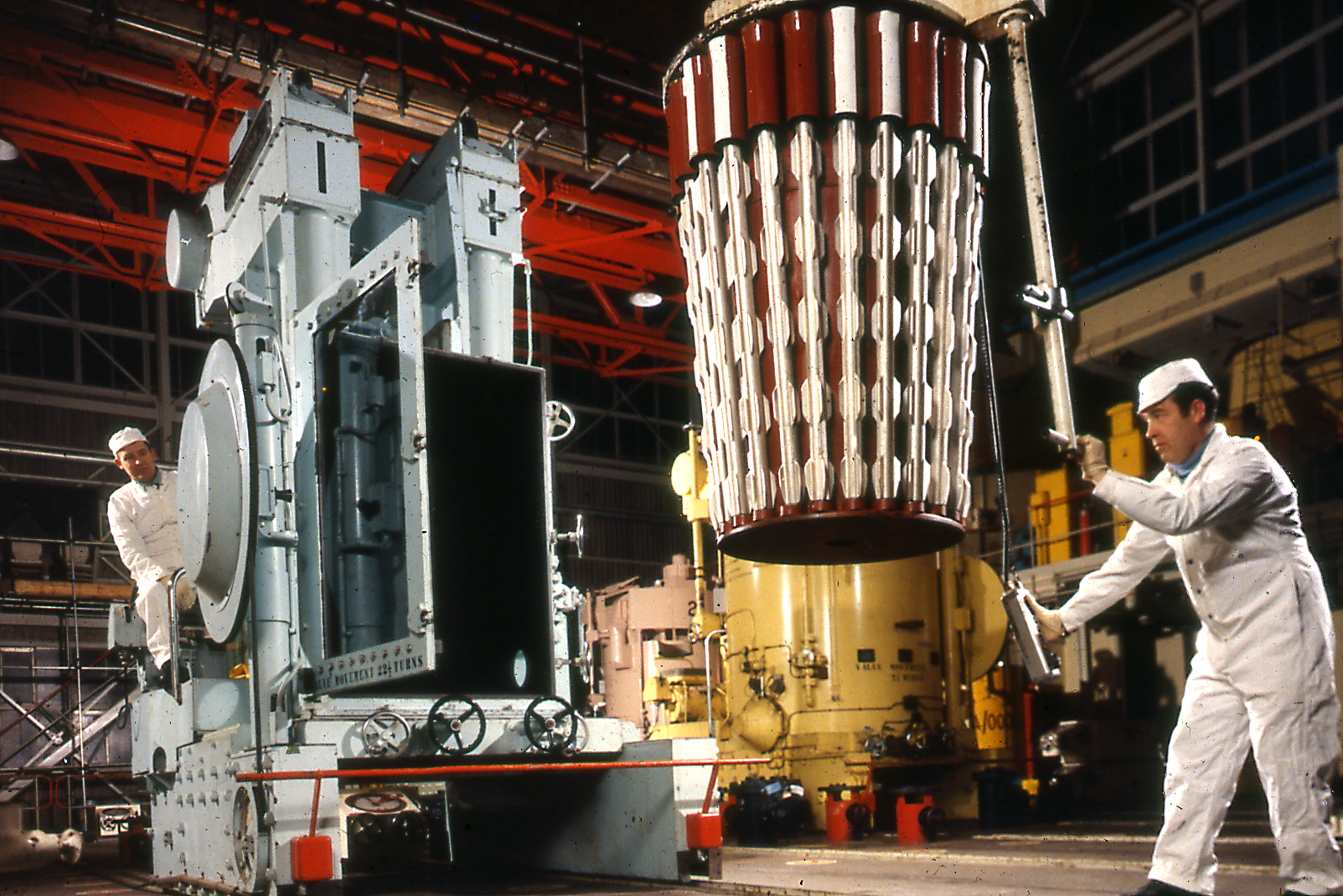
Fuel loading at Calder Hall power station

It was decided by the UK Government to proceed with the civil nuclear power programme in 1952, and construction at Calder Hall began the following year. The station was designed by a team led by Christopher Hinton, Baron Hinton of Bankside.

Calder Hall was built in two phases with the A station containing two reactors supplying heat to four heat exchangers to generate steam to feed four 23MW turbo alternators. Heat transfer from the reactor was by CO2 under pressure circulated by blowers. The four magnox (magnesium non-oxidising, referring to the alloy used for the fuel element cladding) 180 MWth graphite moderated, carbon dioxide cooled nuclear reactors were fuelled by natural uranium enclosed in magnesium-aluminium alloy cans. The reactors each weighed 33,000 tonnes containing 1,696 nuclear fuel channels.

It had two cooling towers, with two further added at the opposite end of the power station in 1958 and 1959 for the B station. Each was 88 metres (289 ft) in height.

The layout was largely emulated at Chapelcross in 1958, though at Calder Hall, the four units are divided by A and B each with their own turbine hall, unlike Chapelcross where all four units shared a turbine hall. The Calder Hall and Chapelcross design was codenamed PIPPA (Pressurised Pile Producing Power and Plutonium) by the UKAEA to denote the plant's dual commercial and military role.

The reactors were supplied by UKAEA, the turbines by C. A. Parsons and Company, and the civil engineering contractor was Taylor Woodrow Construction.

== History ==
Calder Hall was an early development of the existing Windscale site, and due to its size required considerable extension of the site to the south east across the River Calder. It was named after Calder Hall farm, which had farmed the land it was built on, and bridges were built over the River Calder to link to the existing site. It was divided into two operating units, Calder "A" and Calder "B", each having a turbine hall and two cooling towers shared between reactors 1–2, and reactors 3-4 respectively.

Construction began in 1953 and was carried out by Taylor Woodrow Construction and was completed in 1956.

The primary purpose was to produce plutonium for the UK's nuclear weapons programme, for weapons including the WE.177 series. Electricity was always considered to be a by-product.

Calder Hall was officially opened on 17 October 1956 by Queen Elizabeth II. It was initially owned and operated by the Production Group of the United Kingdom Atomic Energy Authority (UKAEA) until the creation of British Nuclear Fuels Limited (BNFL) in 1971. Restructuring by the British government later resulted in a new company, Sellafield Ltd, gaining responsibility for operations of the Sellafield site.

The two units were originally designed for a life of 20 years from respectively 1956 and 1959. However, in July 1996, the plant was granted an operating licence for a further ten years. Its military use, which meant it was shut down for periods of its life, contributed to its long lifetime. Due to embrittlement from years of exposure to radiation, it was decided to close the plant three years sooner than planned.

=== Closure and decommissioning ===
The station was closed on 31 March 2003, the first reactor having been in use for nearly 47 years. Decommissioning started in 2005. The cooling towers were demolished by controlled implosions on 29 September 2007. A period of 12 weeks was required to remove asbestos in the towers' rubble. The reactors were fully defueled by 2019 and the spent fuel was taken across the Sellafield site to be reprocessed within the Magnox Reprocessing Plant. It is planned that by 2027 only the four reactor buildings will be left, and they will be dismantled to the point where only the concrete bio-shield that contains the reactor core remains. The site is expected to be in safe storage by 2027 or later, using the "safestore" principle, which utilises an extended period of care and maintenance to reduce overall decommissioning costs. There had been proposals in 2007 for transforming the station into a museum, involving renovating Calder Hall and preserving the cooling towers, but the costs were found to be too high.

Ownership of all of the site's assets and liabilities was transferred to the Nuclear Decommissioning Authority (NDA), a regulatory body created by the Energy Act 2004. While operations were transferred from BNFL to Sellafield Ltd.

== See also ==
- Nuclear weapons and the United Kingdom
- Nuclear power in the United Kingdom
- Energy policy of the United Kingdom
- Energy use and conservation in the United Kingdom
