= EnergySolutions =

American processor of low level nuclear waste

- Type: Subsidiary
- Industry: Nuclear materials
- Founded: 2006; 20 years ago
- Headquarters: Salt Lake City, Utah, U.S.
- Key people: Kenneth Robuck (CEO and president); Steven Birchfield (CFO); Charles Richardson (COO); Billy Morrison (COO); Brent Shimada (CAO)
- Revenue: $448.3 million
- Net income: $22.5 million
- Parent: TriArtisan Capital Advisors
- Website: www.energysolutions.com

EnergySolutions is an American processor of low level waste (LLW). It is headquartered in Salt Lake City, Utah, United States. It was formed in 2007 when Envirocare acquired three other nuclear waste disposal companies: Scientech D&D, BNG America, and Duratek.

EnergySolutions has operations in over 40 states, with a licensed landfill to dispose of radioactive waste approximately 60 miles (97 km) west of Salt Lake City in Tooele County, Utah. It also operates a disposal site in Barnwell County, South Carolina. The company possesses the technology to convert waste into alternative material such as durable glass and is contracted by the United States Department of Energy to assist in waste conversion efforts. The company held the naming rights to the Utah Jazz home EnergySolutions Arena (Now Delta Center) from November 20, 2006, until October 26, 2015, when Vivint, a home security system provider based in Provo, Utah, acquired the naming rights.

In June 2007 the company took over operation and management of several Magnox atomic plants from British Nuclear Fuels plc in the United Kingdom through the acquisition of the BNFL subsidiary – Reactor Sites Management Company (RMSC).

== Formation of EnergySolutions ==
Envirocare of Utah purchased the Connecticut-based Scientech D&D division in October 2005. On February 2, 2006, Envirocare announced the $90 million purchase of BNG America, a subsidiary of British Nuclear Fuels (BNFL) based in Virginia. Envirocare of Utah was renamed EnergySolutions, with corporate headquarters in Salt Lake City, Utah. On February 7, 2006, EnergySolutions announced it would buy Maryland-based Duratek, a publicly traded company, for $396 million in an all-cash deal. The leveraged buyout was financed by banks led by Citigroup, effectively taking the company private.

After the acquisitions, EnergySolutions had 2,500 employees in 40 states with an annual revenue of $280 million. EnergySolutions owns two of the nation's four commercial low-level nuclear-waste repositories, its primary competitor, Waste Control Specialists, built a fourth repository in Texas.

=== Envirocare ===
Envirocare of Utah, Inc. (Envirocare) buried Class A low level radioactive waste (LLRW) in an engineered landfill. It began operations in 1990 in Clive, Utah.

Envirocare was founded by Iranian immigrant Khosrow Semnani in 1988. Semnani served as president of the company until May 1997, when Envirocare's largest customer—the Department of Energy—requested that he step down in the wake of a bribery scandal.

In mid-December 2004, Semnani sold Envirocare for an undisclosed sum. Steve Creamer became the company's new CEO. The deal was financed by private equity firms, led by Lindsay Goldberg & Bessemer of New York, Creamer Investments, and Peterson Partners both of Salt Lake City. Envirocare management promised to drop its plans to bury hotter class B and C nuclear waste in Utah in deference to growing political opposition to the company, which was poised to ban the waste. Envirocare subsequently made the acquisitions and became EnergySolutions.

=== Duratek ===
Based in Columbia, Maryland, Duratek was founded in 1983. In 1990, the company merged with General Technical Services (GTS); the resulting company was known as GTS Duratek. That year, the company formed a joint venture with another firm — Chem-Nuclear Systems, Inc. — to build a commercial vitrification system.

In 1997, GTS Duratek acquired the Scientific Ecology Group (SEG). In 2000, the company purchased the nuclear services business arm of Waste Management Inc. One year later, the company announced that it was dropping GTS from its name, and was once again known as Duratek.

Duratek was purchased by EnergySolutions at a 25.7% premium over the February 7, 2006 stock price when the merger was announced.

=== Energy Solutions ===
Since its inception, Energy Solutions has collected primarily domestic, Class A nuclear waste for its west Utah desert site.

On June 7, 2007, the company announced the acquisition of the UK based BNFL subsidiary – Reactor Sites Management Company (RSMC). The sale included Magnox Electric Limited (MEL), a wholly owned subsidiary of RSMC, which holds the contracts and licences to operate ten nuclear reactor sites in the UK on behalf of the Nuclear Decommissioning Authority (NDA). Through the acquisition, the company took over operational and management responsibilities of several Magnox atomic plants from British Nuclear Fuels plc.

In 2009 it attempted to bring 20,000 tons of waste from Italy's shuttered nuclear power program through the ports of either Charleston, South Carolina, or New Orleans. After processing in Tennessee, about 1,600 tons would be disposed of in Utah. The importation attempt was eventually abandoned.

EnergySolutions sought permission in 2011 from the State of Utah for its "Semprasafe" process to blend, or dilute, the currently allowed Class A low-level radioactive waste with more radioactive Class B and Class C wastes until it just meets the Class A waste levels its license allows per container at its Clive disposal site. Some estimates projected that this could increase Energy Solutions' Utah site total of 7,450 curies of radiation per annum (2010), to an additional 19,184 to 28,470 curies each year. The Division of Radiation Control of Utah considered, but rejected blending to allow Class B and Class C waste into Utah. This would have made Utah, after Texas, the second state in the US to allow the importation of Class B and C radioactive wastes.

On November 15, 2015, EnergySolutions announced that it had signed a definitive agreement to purchase Waste Control Specialists for $270 million in cash and $20 million in stock. This sale was blocked by the DOJ for breaching anti-trust law.

In November 2015, EnergySolutions sold its Projects, Products and Technology division to WS Atkins plc for $318 million. Energy Capital Partners is the seller. The deal includes EnergySolutions’ North American government, Europe, and Asia businesses, and about 650 employees. EnergySolutions will retain its logistics, processing, and disposal (“LP&D”) business, its reactor decommissioning business, including current projects at Zion, Illinois and La Crosse, Wisconsin, and its North American utility services.

Most of the radioactive waste from the decommissioning of the San Onofre Nuclear Generating Station is going to the Energy Solutions facility in Clive, Utah, and is being transported by rail.
