= The Belvedere Academy =

Location
- 17 Belvidere Road; Princes Park; Liverpool, Merseyside, L8 3TF; England; 53°23′07″N 2°57′27″W

Information
- Type: Academy, GDST (formerly private)
- Established: 1880 (Liverpool High School); 1911 (The Belvedere School); 2007 (The Belvedere Academy)
- Founder: Girls' Public Day School Company
- Department for Education URN: 135174 Tables
- Ofsted: Reports
- Chairman of Academy Trust Board: Professor Susan Iversen
- Principal: Julie Taylor
- Gender: Girls
- Age: 11 to 19
- Enrolment: 833
- Colour
- Website: http://www.belvedereacademy.net/

The Belvedere Academy is an all-ability state-funded girls’ Academy secondary- formerly independent- school in Liverpool, England. Its predecessor, The Belvedere School, was founded in 1880 as Liverpool High School. It is non-denominational, non-feepaying, and one of the 29 schools of the Girls' Day School Trust. In September 2007 it became an Academy, as one of the first two private schools in the UK to do so.

== Academic achievement ==
As of the 2011/12 academic year, the school educates over 730 pupils between the ages of 11 and 18. Following the 2010/11 academic year, 96% of the pupils left the school having achieved five GCSEs, with a grade of A* to C, including both English language and mathematics. This places the non-selective Belvedere Academy in second place in the Liverpool schools' league tables, second only to Liverpool's only remaining selective grammar school.

== History ==
The school was founded in 1880 as Liverpool High School, by the then Girls' Public Day School Company (which became the Girls' Day School Trust). The first building was at 17 Belvidere Road, and the school gradually acquired other premises in the road. The name was changed to The Belvedere School in 1911. The school was a direct grant grammar school while this scheme existed (1946 to 1976), and later took part in the Assisted Places scheme.

From 2000 onwards an "Open Access" scheme was set up by the Sutton Trust in partnership with the Girls' Day School Trust, to fund girls who would otherwise not be able to attend the school due to financial circumstances. This meant that girls admitted into the school were admitted solely on academic potential. In the first three years of the scheme 71% of the entrants had all or part of their fees paid, of whom 32% had their fees fully paid through the Open Access Scheme. The first "access girls" entered the school in September 2000 and achieved record results in their GCSEs, taken Summer 2005.

The school's buildings comprise five Victorian villas and some more recent buildings. There is a new three-storey teaching block which includes science laboratories, dance and drama studios and ICT facilities.

The name of the school is spelt differently from that of the road because of a mistake made by the council when the school was first opened.

=== The Belvedere School GDST ===
The academy's predecessor, The Belvedere School, was rated the best school in Liverpool in the official league tables, having gained 100% 5 A-C passes at GCSE in 2006.

In 2008, 98% of all A-Level exams taken got A-C passes, and 74% of exams received A/B passes, a record for the school.

== Changes ==
The change to an academy resulted in the abolition of school fees, as well as a change in the way in which the school selects its pupils. Unlike grammar and other selective schools, the Belvedere Academy may select only 10% of its pupils by academic potential and fair banding is now employed to ensure intake of the full breadth of academic ability.

At the same time that the senior school became an academy, the junior school was established as a stand-alone non-state funded preparatory school for girls aged three to 11, The Hamlets. This was subsequently sold in 2010 out of GDST ownership, renamed Belvedere Preparatory School and became co-educational.

== Notable former pupils ==
- Alyson J K Bailes (CMG) (1949–2016), diplomat, political scientist, academic and polyglot.
- Dorothy Gradden OBE, leading nuclear engineer
- Linda Grant (b. 1951), novelist.
- Dame Rose Heilbron (1914–2006), barrister.
- Jane Lightfoot (b. 1969), classical scholar
- Liz McClarnon (b. 1981), member of pop group Atomic Kitten, winner of Celebrity Masterchef 2008, and television presenter.
- Esther McVey (b. 1967), journalist, television presenter and Member of Parliament.
- Anne Ziegler (1910–2003), soprano and popular singer-actress.
- Darci Shaw, Actress
