= Low Level Waste Repository =

Low-level radioactive repository in the UK

Coordinates: 54°22′46″N 3°27′25″W

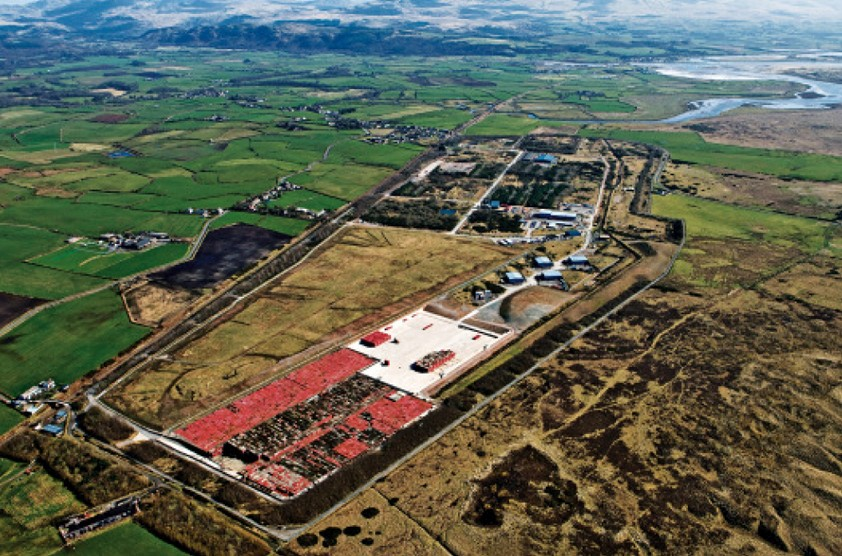
Drigg Low Level Waste Repository from the air

The Low Level Waste Repository is the UK's central long-term store for low-level radioactive waste located on the West Cumbrian coast near Drigg village and opened in 1959. It is a subsidiary of the Nuclear Decommissioning Authority.

== Function ==
The site stores low level radioactive waste from Sellafield, MoD sites, nuclear power stations, hospitals, universities, medical companies and the oil industry. The site, which was opened in 1959 by the United Kingdom Atomic Energy Authority, covers about 270 acres (110 ha) on the site of the former Royal Ordnance Factory (ROF Drigg).

== Ownership and management ==
The Nuclear Decommissioning Authority (NDA), who owned LLWR at the time, announced in March 2008 that UK Nuclear Waste Management Ltd (a consortium led by the Washington Division of URS Corporation and including Studsvik UK, AREVA-NC and Serco Assurance) had been awarded the contract for the management and operation of the Low Level Waste Repository.

This arrangement ceased when the LLWR was brought back under direct public management when it became a subsidiary of the NDA in July 2021. In 2022 LLWR was merged with the NDA's Integrated Waste Management Programme to form a division called Nuclear Waste Services.

== Continued use ==
In 1988, a new system was introduced placing waste in containers rather than clay trenches later covered with stone and soil.

In early 2008, Cumbria County Council granted permission for a new vault, Vault 9, to be built to accommodate about 700 ISO steel containers per year and be able to hold 5,500 ISO steel containers in total, giving an operational life of about eight years. The vault opened for use in 2010.

In 2015, a report from the Environment Agency acknowledged that the site would be disrupted in the future by coastal erosion and flooding, and placed requirements on LLWR Ltd to maintain a programme of coastal monitoring and to keep up-to-date with research and development on the long-term effects of climate change.

In 2023, Nuclear Waste Services started capping and securing full trenches and vaults in preparation for permanent closure, a process that will take five years. A 10-metre (33 ft) thick membrane, the Southern Trench Cap Interim Membrane (STIM), will cover the old trenches to protect the waste for up to 100 years.
