= Scientific Ecology Group =

Scientific Ecology Group, Inc.
- Type: Private
- Founded: 1985
- Headquarters: Oak Ridge
- Key people: H.W. (Bud) Arrowsmith
- Products: Incineration, Metal
- Number of employees: 1,400

Scientific Ecology Group, Inc. located in Oak Ridge, Tennessee was founded by H.W.(Bud) Arrowsmith in 1985. It quickly grew to become the leading radioactive waste processor in the United States employing 1,400 personnel at its largest. Treatment technologies included supercompaction, incineration, vitrification and metal melt.

In 1989, Westinghouse Electric acquired Scientific Ecology Group.

In 1997, GTS Duratek acquired Scientific Ecology Group.

In 2006, EnergySolutions acquired Duratek.
