= Great British Energy – Nuclear =

Nuclear energy and fuels company

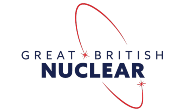
- Type: Government-owned private company limited by shares
- Industry: Nuclear
- Predecessor: United Kingdom Atomic Energy Authority Production Division
- Founded: 1971; 55 years ago
- Fate: Assets sold off initially, resurrected as GBN in 2023
- Successors: British Energy (newer nuclear reactors); Westinghouse Electric Company (US power stations); National Nuclear Laboratory (research); Nuclear Decommissioning Authority (decommissioning regulation and older nuclear reactors); Sellafield Ltd (decommissioning)
- Headquarters: Warrington, England, UK
- Key people: Gwen Parry-Jones, CEO
- Parent: Government of the United Kingdom
- Divisions: Nuclear Sciences and Technology Services
- Subsidiaries: Westinghouse Electric Company (1999–2006); British Nuclear Group (2005-2009)
- Website: www.gov.uk/government/organisations/great-british-energy-nuclear

Great British Energy – Nuclear (GBE-N) is a nuclear energy and fuels company owned by the UK Government based in Warrington, England. It is a non-departmental public body sponsored by the Department for Energy Security and Net Zero.

From its creation as British Nuclear Fuels Limited (BNFL) in 1971 to 2010, it functioned as a manufacturer of nuclear fuel (notably MOX), ran reactors, generated and sold electricity, reprocessed and managed spent fuel (mainly at Sellafield), and decommissioned nuclear plants and other similar facilities.

It was resurrected in July 2023 under the trading name Great British Nuclear, to coordinate the UK nuclear industry to help achieve government net-zero targets. The company formally changed its name to Great British Energy – Nuclear on 20 March 2024.

== History ==
British Nuclear Fuels Limited (BNFL) was set up in February 1971 from the demerger of the production division of the UK Atomic Energy Authority (UKAEA). In 1984, BNFL became a public limited company as British Nuclear Fuels plc, wholly owned by the UK government.

Its US subsidiary BNFL, Inc. was established in 1990 and specialised in decontamination and decommissioning of nuclear sites.

In 1996, seven advanced gas-cooled reactors (AGR) and one pressurised water reactor (PWR) were privatised as British Energy, raising £2.1 billion. The oldest reactors, the Magnox sites, were not attractive for commercial operations and remained in public ownership as Magnox Electric. On 30 January 1998, Magnox Electric was merged into BNFL as BNFL Magnox Generation.

=== Quality data falsification crisis ===
In 1999, it was discovered that BNFL staff had been falsifying some MOX fuel quality assurance data since 1996. A Nuclear Installations Inspectorate (NII) investigation concluded that "the level of control and supervision ... had been virtually non-existent." BNFL had to pay compensation to the Japanese customer, Kansai Electric, and take back a flawed shipment of MOX fuel from Japan. BNFL's Chief Executive John Taylor resigned, after initially resisting resignation when the NII's damning report was published.

As a consequence of this crisis, a possible partial privatisation of BNFL was delayed by two years.

=== Expansion ===
In 1999, BNFL acquired Westinghouse Electric Company, the commercial nuclear power businesses of CBS (Westinghouse acquired CBS in 1995 and reoriented itself as a broadcaster), for $1.1 billion. Westinghouse's businesses are fuel manufacture, decommissioning of nuclear sites and reactor design, construction and servicing. Westinghouse was acquired as a possible core for the privatisation of a portion of BNFL.

In 2000, BNFL also purchased the nuclear businesses of ABB for £300 million. This company, which was merged into Westinghouse, had nuclear interests in the United States, Europe and Asia. In June 2000, BNFL took a 22.5% stake in Pebble Bed Modular Reactor (Pty) Ltd in South Africa.

In January 2003, the research and development arm of BNFL was relaunched as Nuclear Sciences and Technology Services (NSTS).

However, BNFL's financial difficulties increased, and the prospect of partial privatisation diminished.

=== Reorganisation ===
On 1 April 2005, the company was reorganised as part of the restructuring of the wider nuclear industry. BNFL became British Nuclear Group (BNG) and a new holding company was established and adopted the British Nuclear Fuels name. This new BNFL operated largely through its major subsidiaries of Westinghouse and BNG as well as Nexia Solutions, its commercial nuclear technology business formed out of NSTS.

The Nuclear Decommissioning Authority (NDA) was established on 1 April 2005 and took ownership of all of BNFL's nuclear sites, including the Sellafield site. The NDA then opened up the decommissioning of the different sites to tender to drive down costs. BNFL became one of a number of decommissioning contractors through BNG. BNFL's nuclear waste transfer companies, Direct Rail Services and International Nuclear Services, were also both transferred to the NDA.

On 19 April 2005, BNFL, Inc. was renamed BNG America and made a subsidiary of BNG.

==== Sale of Westinghouse ====
In July 2005, BNFL confirmed it planned to sell Westinghouse, then estimated to be worth US$1.8 billion (£1bn). However the bid attracted interest from several companies, including Toshiba, General Electric and Mitsubishi Heavy Industries and when the Financial Times reported on 23 January 2006 that Toshiba had won the bid, it valued the company's offer at US$5bn (£2.8bn). On 6 February 2006, Toshiba confirmed it was buying Westinghouse Electric Company for $5.4bn and announced it would sell a minority stake to investors.

==== Break up of British Nuclear Group ====
On 3 February 2006, BNFL announced it had agreed to sell BNG America to Envirocare to form EnergySolutions.

In March 2006, BNFL announced its intention to sell BNG. With the sale of Westinghouse, BNG America and BNG this was to effectively bring BNFL to an end. Mike Parker, CEO of BNFL, said: "By the end of 2007... there will be little need for the BNFL corporate centre from this time". On 22 August 2006, BNFL announced that instead of selling BNG as a going concern it would instead sell it off piece by piece.

In January 2007, BNFL announced that it would sell BNG's Magnox reactor sites operating business, Reactor Sites Management Company Ltd. It was later sold in June 2007, along with its subsidiary that held the operating contracts with the NDA, Magnox Electric, to EnergySolutions. All UK Magnox power stations were due to cease operation by the end of 2015.

BNG Project Services, BNG's specialist nuclear consulting business, was sold in January 2008 to VT Group, which was itself later acquired in 2010 by Babcock International Group.

BNG was renamed Sellafield Ltd and became the NDA's Site Licence Company (SLC) for the decommissioning contract at Sellafield. In November 2008, the NDA contracted the management of Sellafield Ltd to Nuclear Management Partners Ltd, a consortium of URS, AMEC and Areva.

==== Formation of the National Nuclear Laboratory ====
In July 2006, the UK Government stated its intention to preserve and develop key research and development capabilities potentially as part of a National Nuclear Laboratory (NNL). In October 2006, Secretary of State for Trade and Industry, Alistair Darling confirmed the NNL would be formed out of Nexia Solutions and the British Technology Centre at Sellafield. The NNL was launched in July 2008 as a Government-owned company, and initially was managed under contract by a consortium of Serco, Battelle and the University of Manchester; this is known as a GOCO (Government-Owned, Contractor-Operated) arrangement.

==== Final disposals ====
Control of BNFL's one third stake in Urenco was transferred to the Shareholder Executive in April 2008 through Enrichment Holdings Ltd while the government explored the possibility of selling the stake.

BNFL's one third stake of AWE Management Ltd was sold to Jacobs Engineering Group in December 2008. AWE is responsible for the support and manufacturing of the UK's nuclear deterrent.

As BNFL was wound down it was converted back to a private limited company on 31 December 2008 and regained its original name, British Nuclear Fuels Limited. The final sale transactions for BNFL's former businesses were completed in May 2009.

Despite this, the company itself was not wound up and continued as a legal entity.

=== Resurrection as Great British Nuclear ===
In February 2023, plans to wind up the company within two years were still active. By this point the company had not traded in 13 years.

However, on 18 July 2023, BNFL was resurrected as Great British Nuclear, with the aim of delivering the government's long-term nuclear programme and supporting its ambition to deliver up to 24 GW of nuclear power in the UK by 2050. Great British Nuclear is running a small modular reactor (SMR) competition which will place between one and four co-funding contracts in late 2024, supporting the development and regulatory approval process, to prepare bids for a SMR final investment decision in 2029.

In March 2024, Great British Nuclear bought the Oldbury and Wylfa sites from Horizon in a deal worth £160 million.

=== Renaming as Great British Energy – Nuclear ===
In June 2025, Great British Nuclear was renamed as Great British Energy – Nuclear.

The Guardian reported the renaming was to enable £2.5 billion of Great British Energy's budget to be transferred to the nuclear industry for small modular reactor development in a way compatible with Labour Party 2024 manifesto promises.

In 2026, GBE-N was granted an electricity generating licence. It is proposed that GBE-N build three Rolls-Royce SMRs at Wylfa nuclear power station; the final investment decision is expected in 2029.

== Leadership ==
GBN is led by Gwen Parry-Jones as interim chief executive officer, who was formerly the CEO of Magnox Ltd.

Its chair is Simon Bowen.

== Former sites ==
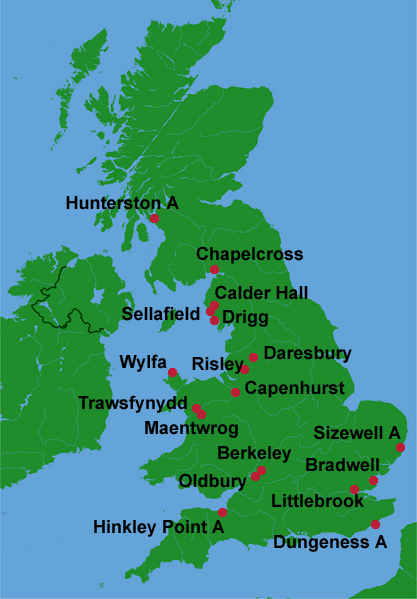
BNFL's 18 UK sites

BNFL formerly had operations at 18 sites in the UK:

- Berkeley nuclear power station (shut down in 1989)
- Bradwell nuclear power station (shut down in 2002)
- Calder Hall nuclear power station (shut down in 2003)
- Capenhurst
- Chapelcross nuclear power station (shut down in 2004)
- Daresbury Laboratory
- Drigg
- Dungeness A nuclear power station (shut down in 2006)
- Hinkley Point A nuclear power station (shut down in 2000)
- Hunterston A nuclear power station (shut down in 1990)
- Littlebrook Power Station
- Maentwrog power station
- Oldbury nuclear power station (shut down in 2012)
- Risley
- Sellafield
- Sizewell A nuclear power station (shut down in 2006)
- Springfields (now in partial decommission)
- Trawsfynydd nuclear power station (shut down in 1993)
- Wylfa nuclear power station (shut down in 2015)

== Former logo ==
BNFL logotype

The former BNFL logotype was created in 1996 by Lloyd Northover, the British design consultancy founded by John Lloyd and Jim Northover.

== See also ==
- Nuclear power in the United Kingdom
- Energy policy of the United Kingdom
- Energy use and conservation in the United Kingdom
