= Washington Group International =

Former American engineering services company

- Industry: Provided integrated engineering, construction, and management services
- Founded: 1964
- Founder: Dennis R. Washington
- Fate: Acquired by URS Corporation
- Headquarters: Boise, Idaho
- Number of employees: 25,000

Washington Group International was an American corporation which provided integrated engineering, construction, and management services to businesses and governments around the world. Based in Boise, Idaho, WGI had approximately 25,000 employees working in over 40 US states and more than 30 countries. Its primary areas of expertise were: infrastructure, mining, industrial/process, energy & environment, and power. It was acquired by URS Corporation of San Francisco in November 2007 for $3.1 billion, and which was subsequently purchased by AECOM.

== Washington Construction ==
At the age of 30, Dennis R. Washington founded Washington Construction Company in Missoula, Montana in 1964. He guided the company to the top of the civil construction market in Montana, and expanded into mining, industrial construction, and environmental cleanup work. As his company grew into a major regional firm, Washington's vision for the future continued to expand also - leading to a series of acquisitions that produced an international company.

In 1993 it expanded its heavy civil construction-operation, when it merged with Kasler Corporation, a California-based firm with large-scale operations in heavy-civil construction. Washington Construction Group Inc. was then based in Highland, California.

== Morrison Knudsen Co. ==
In 1996, the much smaller Washington Construction Group merged with Morrison-Knudsen Corp. of Boise, which had been in financial difficulty. Morrison Knudsen acquired operating subsidiaries of Westinghouse and Raytheon in 1999 and 2000, and changed its name to Washington Group International.

== Acquisition by URS ==
On May 28, 2007, URS Corporation, based in San Francisco, announced it had reached an initial agreement with WGI management to purchase the entire company for $2.6 billion (about $80 per share). WGI would operate as a division of URS, with the headquarters remaining in Boise. On November 15, the price was increased and finalized for a purchase price of $3.1 billion ($95.116 per share).

URS competitors include Bechtel, Fluor Corp., CB&I, Kiewit, and Jacobs Engineering Group.

URS was purchased by AECOM in 2014.

== See also ==
- List of locomotive builders
- Top 100 US Federal Contractors
