= Nuclear Decommissioning Authority =

Public body sponsored by the United Kingdom Government

Agency overview
- Formed: 1 April 2005
- Preceding agency: Coal and Nuclear Liabilities Unit
- Jurisdiction: United Kingdom
- Headquarters: Moor Row, England, UK
- Employees: 250 (subsidiaries about 15,000)
- Minister responsible: Michael Shanks, Minister of State for Energy
- Agency executives: Catriona Schmolke, interim chair; David Peattie, chief executive
- Parent department: Department for Energy Security and Net Zero
- Child agencies: International Nuclear Services; Direct Rail Services; Radioactive Waste Management; Sellafield Ltd
- Website: www.gov.uk/government/organisations/nuclear-decommissioning-authority

The Nuclear Decommissioning Authority (NDA) is a non-departmental public body of the Department for Energy Security and Net Zero (formerly the Department for Business, Energy and Industrial Strategy) formed by the Energy Act 2004. It evolved from the Coal and Nuclear Liabilities Unit of the Department of Trade and Industry. It came into existence during late 2004, and took on its main functions on 1 April 2005. Its purpose is to deliver the decommissioning and clean-up of the UK's civil nuclear legacy in a safe and cost-effective manner, and where possible to accelerate programmes of work that reduce hazard.

Although the NDA itself employs about 250 staff, its subsidiaries employ about 15,000 staff across the NDA estate. Its annual budget is £3.5 billion, the vast majority of which is spent through contracts with site licence companies, who also subcontract to other companies which provide special services. The NDA aims to do this by introducing innovation and contractor expertise through a series of competitions similar to the model that has been used in the United States.

In April 2017, the NDA lost a legal case in the Supreme Court regarding the procurement of a sizeable contract for the decommissioning of twelve different Magnox nuclear facilities when EnergySolutions EU (now called ATK Energy EU) challenged a decision in connection with ATK's unsuccessful bid. In February 2018 Parliament's Public Accounts Committee (PAC) concluded that the NDA had "dramatically under-estimated" costs and "completely failed" in the procurement and management of the Magnox Ltd contract, which was one of the highest value contracts let by the government. An independent inquiry into the deal was set up.

== Activities ==
=== Objectives ===
The main objectives of NDA are to:

- eliminate site hazards and develop waste solutions;
- ensure the highest standards in safety, security and environmental management;
- build an effective world class industry;
- gain full approval and support from stakeholders (employees, contractors, government, local communities and general public); and
- make best use of assets and maximise value-for-money.

=== Structure ===
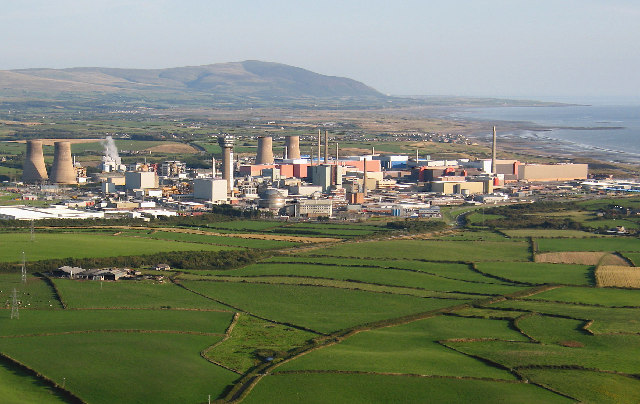
Sellafield, NDA's largest site

Responsibility for operating the sites has been restructured into five site licence companies (SLC). Management of the SLCs was formerly contracted out to different parent body organisations (PBO), some of which were initially owned by private companies. More recently, the NDA has transitioned to a "group approach" of SLCs being wholly owned NDA subsidiaries

- Sellafield Ltd was previously BNFL's British Nuclear Group subsidiary. It comprises the Sellafield nuclear chemical facility and Calder Hall. It also previously managed the Capehurst uranium enrichment plant, which is now owned by Urenco. Its PBO was formerly Nuclear Management Partners Ltd, a consortium of URS, Amec Foster Wheeler and Areva. However, Sellafield Ltd has been under the direct control of the NDA since April 2016.
- Nuclear Restoration Services (NRS), previously two separate site licence companies, manages ten Magnox nuclear power stations and the Harwell and Winfrith facilities. It comprises Chapelcross, Hunterston A, Trawsfynydd, Wylfa and Oldbury (previously Magnox North) and Berkeley, Bradwell, Dungeness A, Hinkley Point A and Sizewell A (previously Magnox South). Its PBO was formerly Cavendish Fluor Partnership, a consortium of Babcock International and Fluor. Previously known as Magnox Ltd, NRS has been a subsidiary of the NDA since September 2019. NRS took over Dounreay Site Restoration Limited (DSRL) comprises the Dounreay site. Until March 2021, its PBO was Cavendish Dounreay Partnership, a consortium of Babcock International, CH2M Hill and URS. It is now directly managed by the NDA.
- Nuclear Waste Services comprises Radioactive Waste Management (RWM), which is responsible for implementing a geological disposal facility in the UK and provide radioactive waste management solutions; and the Low Level Waste Repository near Drigg in Cumbria. Until July 2021, its PBO was UK Nuclear Waste Management, a consortium of URS, Studsvik, Areva and Serco. It is now a subsidiary of the NDA.
- Springfields Fuels comprises the Springfields nuclear fuel production facility near Preston, Lancashire. Its PBO is Westinghouse Electric Company, owned by a consortium of Brookfield Renewable Partners and Cameco.

On its creation, the NDA also took over ownership of Direct Rail Services, the rail freight operating company set up by BNFL in 1995 to transport nuclear materials; and International Nuclear Services, which operates services on behalf of the NDA for the management and transportation of nuclear fuels. Both have since merged to become Nuclear Transport Solutions.

In February 2017, a national archive for the UK civil nuclear industry, named Nucleus, was opened in Wick, Caithness, Scotland.

== Costs ==
NDA increasing estimates of remaining cost of decommissioning and clean-up
Year of estimate	Sellafield	Other NDA sites	Total
Year of estimate	(£ billions, discounted)		
2009-10	25.2	19.9	45.1
2010-11	32.7	16.5	49.2
2011-12	37.2	15.6	52.9
2012-13	42.0	16.9	58.9
2013-14	47.9	17.0	64.9
2015-16	117.4	43.3	160.7
2017-18	n/a	n/a	234.1
2018-19	94.0 (undiscounted)	30.3 (undiscounted)	130.7
2019-20	96.5 (undiscounted)	35.1 (undiscounted)	134.9

In 2005, the cost of decommissioning these sites was planned at £55.8 billion, with Sellafield requiring £31.5 billion. However, in 2006, the NDA reported that the cost of cleaning up existing waste was higher than previously thought, and gave a new estimated decommissioning cost of about £72 billion over a 100-year period. In 2008, estimated decommissioning costs increased to £73.6 billion, or after taking account of discount rates, £44.1 billion. A 2006 estimate foresaw £14 billion of offsetting income from reprocessing fuel at Sellafield. In 2009, the NDA sold land near three existing reactor sites for expected new nuclear power stations, for over £200 million.

In 2013, a critical Public Accounts Committee report stated that the private consortium managing Sellafield has failed to reduce costs and delays. Between 2005 and 2013, the annual costs of operating Sellafield increased from £900 million to about £1.6 billion. The estimated lifetime undiscounted cost of dealing with the Sellafield site increased to £67.5 billion. Bosses were forced to apologise after projected clean-up costs passed the £70 billion mark in late 2013. In 2014, the undiscounted decommissioning cost estimate for Sellafield was increased to £79.1 billion, and by 2015 to £117.4 billion. The annual operating cost will be £2 billion in 2016.

In 2018, the discount rate used in evaluating future spending was changed from a HM Treasury determined real terms discount rate to a rate that combined a nominal discount rate and an implied inflation rate based on Consumer Price Index forecasts. This nearly halved the estimate of the remaining cost of decommissioning and clean-up.

The expenditure of the NDA in 2022/23 was £3,759M and income £1,059M, leading to a net expenditure of £2,700M.

== National Nuclear Laboratory ==
In 2006, the then Secretary of State for Trade and Industry announced his support for a National Nuclear Laboratory (NNL) to be based on the British Technology Centre at Sellafield and Nexia Solutions. The NDA, as the owner of Sellafield site and the funder of majority of research required across the nuclear estate, was involved establishing the NNL in 2009. The NNL complements other initiatives to develop a sustainable workforce such as the National Skills Academy for Nuclear (NSAN) network, including the development of Energus in West Cumbria, alongside complementary research and development facilities such as the Dalton Nuclear Institute.
