= Sellafield Ltd =

Nuclear decommissioning company

- Company type: Private limited company
- Industry: Nuclear decommissioning
- Founded: 2005
- Headquarters: Risley, Cheshire
- Owner: HM Government
- Number of employees: over 10,000
- Parent: Nuclear Decommissioning Authority
- Website: www.gov.uk/government/organisations/sellafield-ltd

Sellafield Ltd is a British nuclear decommissioning Site Licence Company (SLC) controlled by the Nuclear Decommissioning Authority (NDA), a UK government body set up specifically to deal with the nuclear legacy under the Energy Act 2004. From 2008 to 2016, it was operated under licence from the NDA by a third party Parent Body Organisation called Nuclear Management Partners (NMP). Since the termination of the NMP contract it has been brought back under direct governmental control by making it a subsidiary of the NDA.

Sellafield Ltd's main aim is to manage the decommissioning of the Sellafield facility in Cumbria, England, on behalf of the NDA. The company employs more than 13,000 workers and its focus is to deliver accelerated nuclear decommissioning and clean-up programmes. It is also involved in nuclear fuel production and reprocessing, and international nuclear decommissioning and transportation.

== History ==
Sellafield Ltd was formed out of the remains of British Nuclear Group (BNG), a subsidiary of British Nuclear Fuels Ltd (BNFL). BNG was created from a reorganisation of BNFL in 2005, bringing together all of BNFL's businesses into one unit, with the exception of Nexia Solutions and Westinghouse Electric Company. It was BNFL's initial intention in 2006 to sell BNG whole as one business, however it was later decided to break up BNG and sell each asset individually to maximise revenue.

Consequently, BNG's US subsidiary (BNG America), its Magnox reactor business (Reactor Sites Management Company), its consultancy business (BNG Project Services), and its one third share in Atomic Weapons Establishment management company (AWE Management Ltd) were all sold individually. The remaining business of BNG was made responsible for the decommissioning work at Sellafield. This was renamed Sellafield Ltd and ownership was passed to the Nuclear Decommissioning Authority (NDA).

In 2008 the NDA contracted the management of Sellafield Ltd to Nuclear Management Partners Ltd, a consortium of US company URS, British company AMEC, and Areva of France. The initial contract was for five years, with an extension option for 17 years.

In 2016, the NDA took Sellafield Ltd back under direct control from Nuclear Management Partners, by making the company a subsidiary of the NDA. The NDA owns the Sellafield site and its liabilities, and owns all of the shares in Sellafield Ltd, which is responsible for the safe and secure operation and management of the site.

In 2024 the company was fined £332,500 along with prosecution costs of £53,253.20 for inadequate cybersecurity. The Office for Nuclear Regulation found that the company "persistently" breached regulations regarding cybersecurity, though there was no evidence the flaws had been exploited.
