= URS Corporation =

Former American diversified engineering firm

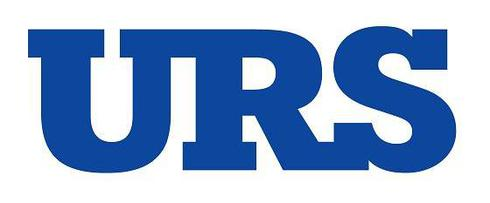
- Type: Subsidiary
- Industry: Engineering; Architecture; Construction; Planning; Management; Information Technology; Operations; Decommissioning
- Founded: 1951; 75 years ago
- Defunct: October 20, 2014
- Fate: Acquired by AECOM
- Headquarters: Transamerica Pyramid; San Francisco, California, United States
- Area served: Worldwide
- Key people: Martin M. Koffel (CEO from 1989 to 2014)
- Revenue: ▲US$ 10.6 billion (2012)
- Operating income: ▲US$ 600 million (2012)
- Net income: ▲US$ 400 million (2012)
- Total assets: ▲US$ 7.04 billion (2012)
- Total equity: ▲US$ 3.905 billion (2009)
- Number of employees: ▲56,000 (2012)
- Parent: AECOM

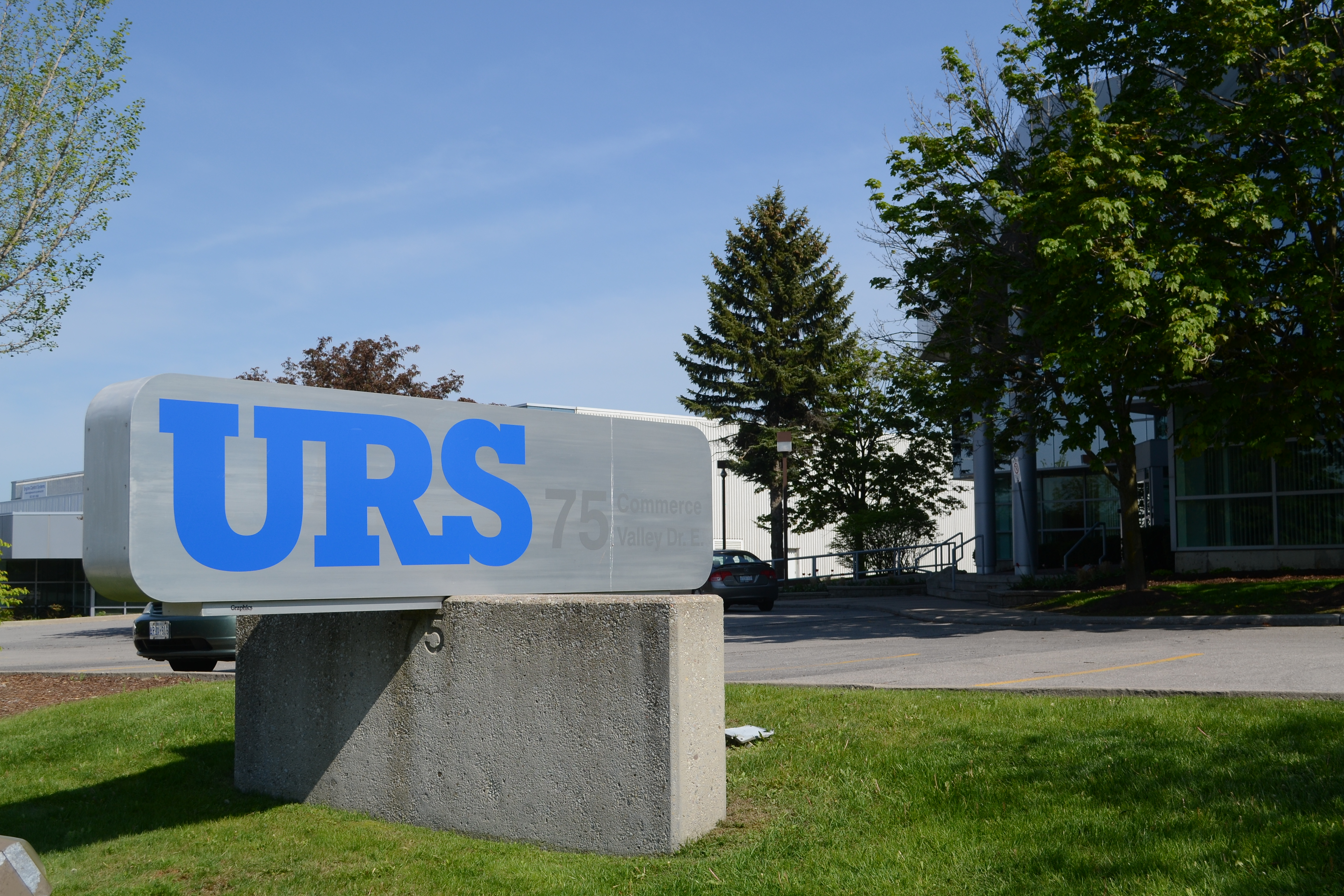
URS in Canada

URS Corporation (formerly United Research Services) was an engineering, design, and construction firm and a U.S. federal government contractor. Headquartered in San Francisco, California, URS was a full-service, global organization with offices located in the Americas, Europe, Africa, and Asia-Pacific.

URS was acquired by AECOM on October 17, 2014.

== History ==
URS Corporation's oldest predecessor company was founded in 1904. URS was established in 1951 and incorporated in 1957 as Broadview Research – a research group active in the area of physical and engineering sciences. In 1967, management developed a growth strategy focused on building a multidisciplinary professional services firm. In 1968, Broadview Research acquired United Research Incorporated of Cambridge, Massachusetts. During this period, the name Broadview Research was changed to United Research Services and later shortened to URS.

URS was publicly traded as "URS" on the NYSE from January 13, 1978 through its acquisition by AECOM on October 17, 2014. It was originally traded as Thortec. A major investor was Richard Blum, husband of Senator Dianne Feinstein.

As of June 2013, the firm had more than 50,000 employees worldwide, in nearly 50 countries.

=== Activist investor demands and sale of company ===
Following announcements in early February 2014 that the fiscal year 2013 revenue and earnings were below expectations, URS made some management changes. URS had acquired Flint Energy Services for $1.25 billion in February 2012, creating an oil and gas division for the company. Issues in the oil and gas division were cited for the poor financial performance in fiscal year 2013 and URS announced the resignation of senior staff from that division. By the end of February 2014, the hedge fund Jana Partners disclosed that they had acquired an activist investor ownership position in the publicly traded company, announcing an intent to engage the corporate management on board and corporate structure and to create shareholder value.

Amidst industry speculation of a corporate breakup for URS, AECOM announced on July 13, 2014 that an agreement was reached to acquire URS for about $4 billion in cash and shares with another $2 billion in assumed debt. The final acquisition was decided on October 17, 2014, and URS was officially part of AECOM as of October 20, 2014.

== Mergers and acquisitions ==
In 1996, URS acquired Greiner Engineering for $73.5 million. Greiner Engineering had been established in 1908 by John E. Greiner. Greiner was a former bridge engineer for the Baltimore and Ohio Railroad and worked at one time for Gustav Lindenthal, including on the Seventh Street Bridge.

URS acquired the Denver, Colorado based civil, geotechnical and environmental engineering firm Woodward-Clyde Group in 1997 for $100 Million, bringing additional environmental capabilities and a broader international presence to the organization. When Dames & Moore Group joined in 1999 (which had recently absorbed the Australian firm Hardcastle & Richards), URS further strengthened its program and construction management expertise and added to its FORTUNE 500 client base. In February 1999, URS also acquired transport consultant Thorburn Colquhoun.

In 2002, URS acquired EG&G Technical Services, positioning the company as a leading U.S. federal services contractor.

In November 2007, URS acquired Washington Group International of Boise for $3.1B and operated it as the "Energy and Construction Division".

On June 12, 2009, URS Chief Executive Officer Martin Koffel indicated the company was still on the hunt for "transformative acquisitions". An analyst with Gabelli & Co. stated that KBR, Chicago Bridge & Iron Company, and Foster Wheeler AG may be possible takeover targets.

On September 10, 2010, URS completed its acquisition of the British engineering firm Scott Wilson Group.

On June 2, 2011, URS completed its acquisition of Apptis Holdings, Inc. for a purchase price of $260 million in cash.

URS announced its acquisition of Flint Energy Services, a provider of construction services in the oil and gas industry, based in Calgary, Alberta, on February 20, 2012.

On October 20, 2014, URS was officially acquired by AECOM.

== Projects ==
URS provided ongoing management and operation of the 4,200 acres (1,700 ha) Kennedy Space Center complex, including its 900 mission-specific facilities, 16,000 unique NASA systems and equipment, and 600 unique U.S. Air Force systems and equipment.

In the United Kingdom, a URS-led team was responsible for management and operation services at the Sellafield nuclear complex, including commercial operations, waste management, support services, decontamination and decommissioning, and new construction projects. Sellafield is one of the largest and most complex nuclear sites in the U.K., storing and treating nuclear waste from both the U.K.'s military and civil nuclear programs. URS lost this contract in January 2015.

URS provided comprehensive project and construction management services for the reconstruction of the Ronald Reagan UCLA Medical Center, the largest building project ever undertaken by the University of California.

URS was the contractor for the Port Washington Generating Station in Wisconsin, an 1100 MW combined-cycle power plant, which was recognized by Power Magazine as one of its top plants of 2008. URS also helped build the state-of-the-art Holcim cement manufacturing plant in Missouri, one of the largest cement manufacturing facilities in the world.

=== I-35W bridge ===
The I-35W bridge in Minneapolis collapsed in August 2007, killing 13 people and injuring 145. In 2003, URS was retained by the Minnesota Department of Transportation to conduct a fatigue evaluation and a redundancy analysis of the bridge. Lawsuits filed in 2008 and 2009 cite the company with negligence. In 2010, these lawsuits were settled out of court without an admission of negligence or wrongdoing on the part of URS.

In November 2008, the National Transportation Safety Board determined the probable cause of the collapse of the I-35W bridge was "inadequate load capacity, due to a design error by Sverdrup & Parcel and Associates, Inc., of the gusset plates at the U10 nodes, which failed under a combination of (1) substantial increases in the weight of the bridge, which resulted from previous modifications, and (2) the traffic and concentrated construction loads on the bridge on the day of the accident." URS was not involved in the work being conducted on the bridge at the time of the collapse or in the design of the bridge.

=== Martin Olav Sabo Bridge ===
The Martin Olav Sabo Bridge over Hiawatha Avenue in Minneapolis experienced failure of two of its longest support cables on February 20, 2012. URS Corporation was the design consultant for the bridge that was completed in 2007. These failures resulted in closures of Hiawatha Avenue and the adjacent light rail between Mall of America and downtown Minneapolis for safety precautions while support structures were put in place. Rail service was restored after four days while Hiawatha Avenue road traffic remained closed for staging of construction equipment. This failure occurred less than 18 months after URS Corporation settled out of court the lawsuits surrounding the I-35W bridge collapse.

URS was one of the contractors responsible for operating nuclear facilities at Los Alamos. In 2011, URS was involved in an incident that nearly caused an uncontrolled nuclear reaction when plutonium was mishandled. This occurred during lax safety protocols and after URS replaced all members of the criticality safety team with URS employees.

== See also ==
- Top 100 US Federal Contractors
