= Windscale Piles =

Former air-cooled graphite-moderated nuclear reactors

Coordinates: 54.4237°N 3.4982°W

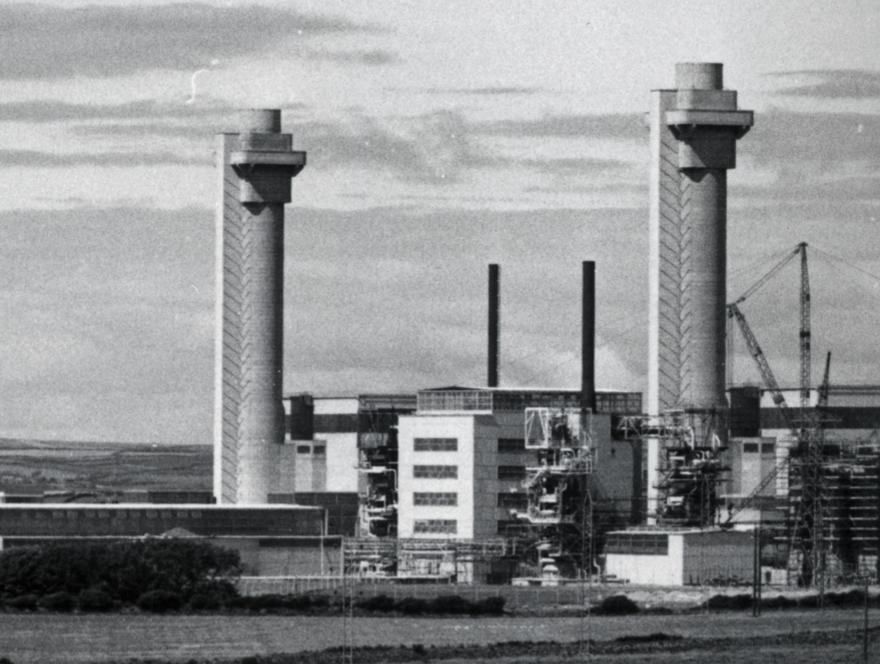
- Windscale Piles circa 1956
- Designed and built by: Ministry of Supply
- Operational: 1950 to 1957
- Status: Undergoing decommissioning

Main parameters of the reactor core
- Fuel (fissile material): Metallic natural uranium, slightly enriched uranium
- Fuel state: Solid (rods)
- Neutron energy spectrum: Information missing
- Primary control method: Control rods
- Primary moderator: Nuclear graphite
- Primary coolant: Air

Reactor usage
- Primary use: Plutonium production
- Power (thermal): 2 × 180 MW
- Remarks: Shut down after the Windscale fire on 10 October 1957

The Windscale Piles were two air-cooled graphite-moderated nuclear reactors on the Windscale nuclear site in Cumberland (now known as Sellafield site, Cumbria) on the north-west coast of England. The two reactors, referred to at the time as "piles", were built as part of the British post-war atomic bomb project and produced weapons-grade plutonium for use in nuclear weapons.

Windscale Pile No. 1 became operational in October 1950 followed by Pile No. 2 in June 1951. They were intended to last five years, but operated for seven until shut down following the Windscale fire on 10 October 1957. Nuclear decommissioning operations commenced in the 1980s and are estimated to last beyond 2040. Visible changes have been seen as the chimneys were slowly dismantled from top-down; Pile 2's chimney being reduced to the height of adjacent buildings in the early 2000s. However, the demolition of pile 1 chimney has taken much longer as it was significantly contaminated after the 1957 fire. The reactor cores still remain to be dismantled.

== Background ==
The 1938 discovery of nuclear fission by Otto Hahn and Fritz Strassmann, and its explanation by Lise Meitner and Otto Frisch, raised the possibility that an extremely powerful atomic bomb could be created. During the Second World War, Frisch and Rudolf Peierls at the University of Birmingham calculated the critical mass of a metallic sphere of pure uranium-235, and found that as little as 1 to 10 kilograms (2.2 to 22.0 lb) might explode with the power of thousands of tons of dynamite.

In response, the British government initiated an atomic bomb project, code-named Tube Alloys. The August 1943 Quebec Agreement merged Tube Alloys with the American Manhattan Project. As overall head of the British Mission, James Chadwick forged a close and successful partnership with Brigadier General Leslie R. Groves, the director of the Manhattan Project, and ensured that the British contribution to the Manhattan Project was complete and wholehearted.

After the war ended the Special Relationship between Britain and the United States "became very much less special". The British government had trusted that America would continue to share nuclear technology, which it considered a joint discovery, but little information was exchanged immediately after the war, and the Atomic Energy Act of 1946 (McMahon Act) officially ended technical cooperation. Its control of "restricted data" prevented the United States' allies from receiving any further research and development information.

The British government saw this as a resurgence of United States isolationism akin to that which had occurred after the First World War. This raised the possibility that Britain might have to fight an aggressor alone. It also feared that Britain might lose its great power status, and therefore its influence in world affairs. The Prime Minister of the United Kingdom, Clement Attlee, set up a cabinet sub-committee, the Gen 75 Committee (known informally as the "Atomic Bomb Committee"), on 10 August 1945 to examine the feasibility of a renewed nuclear weapons programme.

The Tube Alloys Directorate was transferred from the Department of Scientific and Industrial Research to the Ministry of Supply on 1 November 1945, and Lord Portal was appointed Controller of Production, Atomic Energy (CPAE), with direct access to the Prime Minister. An Atomic Energy Research Establishment (AERE) was established on 29 October 1945 at RAF Harwell, south of Oxford, under the directorship of John Cockcroft. Christopher Hinton agreed to oversee the design, construction and operation of the new nuclear weapons facilities, which included a uranium metal plant at Springfields in Lancashire, and nuclear reactors and plutonium processing facilities at Windscale in Cumbria. He established his headquarters in a former Royal Ordnance Factory (ROF) at Risley in Lancashire on 4 February 1946.

In July 1946, the Chiefs of Staff Committee recommended that Britain acquire nuclear weapons. They estimated that 200 bombs would be required by 1957. The 8 January 1947 meeting of the Gen 163 Committee, a subcommittee of the Gen 75 Committee, agreed to proceed with the development of atomic bombs, and endorsed Portal's proposal to place William Penney, the Chief Superintendent Armament Research (CSAR) at Fort Halstead in Kent, in charge of the development effort, which was codenamed High Explosive Research. Penney contended that "the discriminative test for a first-class power is whether it has made an atomic bomb and we have either got to pass the test or suffer a serious loss of prestige both inside this country and internationally."

== Design and location ==
=== Product ===
Through their participation in the wartime Tube Alloys and Manhattan Project, British scientists had considerable knowledge of the production of fissile materials. The Americans had created two kinds: uranium-235 and plutonium, and had pursued three different methods of uranium enrichment to produce the former. British scientists had been most heavily involved with the electromagnetic isotope separation process, but it was recognised that it might be uneconomical in peacetime. They also knew a great deal about the gaseous diffusion process through work done not just in the United States, but in Britain as well, where ICI had designed a gaseous diffusion production plant, and a pilot plant to produce membranes for it was under construction. Least was known about the production of plutonium in nuclear reactors, or "piles" as they were often known at the time; only Chadwick had been permitted to visit the Manhattan Project's reactors.

An early decision had to be taken as to whether High Explosive Research should concentrate on uranium-235 or plutonium. While everyone would have liked to pursue every avenue, like the Americans had, it was doubtful whether the cash-strapped post-war British economy could afford the money or the skilled manpower that this would require. The scientists who had remained in Britain favoured uranium-235, which could be enriched with gaseous diffusion, and a final electromagnetic step. However, those who had been working at the Los Alamos Laboratory in America were strongly in favour of plutonium.

They estimated that a uranium-235 bomb would require ten times the fissile material as one using plutonium to produce half the TNT equivalent. Estimates of the cost of nuclear reactors varied, but were about half that of a gaseous diffusion plant. Thus, a gaseous diffusion plant would cost ten times as much to produce the same number of atomic bombs each year. The decision was therefore taken in favour of plutonium. Part of the deficit of technical knowledge was addressed by the Montreal Laboratory in Canada, where the ZEEP reactor went critical on 5 September 1945, and the Americans had supplied some irradiated fuel rods for experiments with plutonium separation there.

=== Moderator ===
The British scientists were aware that the choices they made at this point might influence British reactor design for many years to come. In designing a reactor, there are three key choices to be made: that of the fuel, the moderator, and the coolant. The first choice, that of fuel, was a Hobson's choice: the only fuel available was natural uranium, since there were no enrichment plants to produce uranium-235, and no reactors to produce plutonium or uranium-233. This restricted the choice of moderators to heavy water and graphite. Although ZEEP had used heavy water, this was not available in the UK. The choice therefore narrowed to graphite. The first nuclear reactor in the UK, a small 100 kW research reactor known as GLEEP, went critical at Harwell on 15 August 1947.

This was fine for some experimental work, but the production of radioactive isotopes required a more powerful 6,000 kW reactor with a higher neutron flux. For this, British scientists and engineers at the Montreal Laboratory designed the British Experimental Pile Zero (BEPO). Risley handled the engineering and construction. Hinton designated James Kendall as the engineer in charge of reactor design, both BEPO and the production reactors. His team worked closely with the scientists at Harwell, in particular J. V. Dunworth, F. W. Fenning and C. A. Rennie. For an experimental reactor like BEPO, air cooling was the obvious choice. The resulting reactor was thus quite similar to the Manhattan Project's X-10 Graphite Reactor in both design and purpose. BEPO went critical on 5 July 1948.

Much was learned from the design and construction of BEPO, which ran continuously until it was decommissioned in December 1968. When it came to the design of the much larger production reactors, the initial assumption was that they would differ from BEPO in that they would be water cooled. It was known that this was the approach that the Americans had taken at the Hanford Site, although only Portal was allowed to visit it, and not being a scientist, had not brought back much useful information.

It was estimated that a water-cooled reactor the size of the B Reactor at Hanford required about 30 million imperial gallons (140 megalitres) of water per day, and it had to be exceptionally pure lest it corrode the tubes holding the uranium fuel rods. Because water absorbed neutrons, a loss of cooling water would not only mean a rise in temperature, but would also trigger an increase in the number of neutrons in the reactor, creating more fissions and increasing the temperature further, possibly resulting in a nuclear meltdown and the release of radioactive fission products. Groves confided to the British in 1946 that he "would not be surprised to be called to the telephone any morning to hear the news that one of the piles had gone up."

=== Location ===
To minimise this risk, the Americans had established strict siting criteria. The reactors were to be located 50 miles (80 km) from any town with a population of over 50,000, 25 miles (40 km) from one of over 10,000, and 5 miles (8.0 km) from one of over 1,000, and were to be built 5 miles apart. Groves also had a 30-mile (48 km) four-lane highway built in order to evacuate the Hanford area in an emergency. If such criteria were applied in the UK, all of England and Wales would have been ruled out, leaving only the north and west of Scotland.

The possibility of building reactors in Canada was suggested by Chadwick and Cockcroft, and strongly supported by the Field Marshal Lord Wilson, the Chief of the British Joint Staff Mission, and the Americans, but was rejected by the British government. Canada was outside the sterling area and construction costs could only be met by further borrowing from Canada. Under the circumstances, the reactors would be owned and controlled by the Canadian government, and this the British government could not accept.

The location of the Windscale Piles

A consulting engineer firm was brought in to advise on possible locations. Two were suggested: Harlech in Wales and Arisaig in Scotland. Hinton opposed Harlech on the basis of its historic associations, and because too many people lived nearby. That left Arisaig, and the remoteness of the site foreshadowed difficulties with communications and finding skilled labour. At this point, Risley began reconsidering the technology of an air-cooled reactor. R. G. Newell, who had been the wartime head of the engineering section at the Montreal Laboratory, proposed in a 1946 paper that the reactor be encased in a pressure vessel. This would make it safer, and it would allow more heat to be obtained from a given core size.

Another, by Risley engineers D. W. Ginns, H. H. Gott and J. L. Dickson, put forward a series of proposals to increase the efficiency of an air cooling system. These included adding fins to the aluminium cans containing the uranium fuel elements to increase their surface area; and having the cooling air enter the reactor centrally so it could flow outwards instead of being pumped from one end to another. These changes allowed the cooling to be conducted with much less pumping power. Harwell engineers J. Diamond and J. Hodge conducted a series of tests which showed that with these innovations, air at atmospheric pressure would suffice for cooling a small reactor for plutonium production, although not a large one for nuclear power.

Hinton estimated that dispensing with the water would reduce the costs by 40 per cent; the design was simpler and the time to build it was less. He recommended to Portal that design work on water-cooled reactors be dropped and all work concentrated on air-cooled and pressurised gas-cooled designs, the latter being seen as the way of the future. Work on water-cooled designs ended in April 1947. The location criteria were now relaxed, and the former ROF Drigg site on the coast of Cumberland was selected.

One complication was that Courtaulds planned to use the old plant at nearby ROF Sellafield to produce rayon. Considering that the labour market in the area could not sustain two large projects, Courtaulds withdrew, and relinquished the 300-acre (120 ha) site. It was considered a more suitable location for a reactor. The use was consistent with planning proposals for the Lake District National Park; water was available from Wast Water without engineering works; and the site already had a railway siding and some office and service buildings, which saved construction time and effort. To avoid confusion with the nuclear fuel production site at Springfields, the name was changed to Windscale, which was actually the name of a bluff overlooking the Calder River on the site.

A single reactor was costed at £20 million, but two could be built for between £30 million and £35 million. The number needed depended on the number of bombs required. In their report to Attlee on 1 January 1946, the Chiefs of Staff recommended that two be built, but for the moment it was fixed at one reactor capable of producing 15 bombs per annum. In his address to the House of Commons on 8 October 1946, Attlee referred indirectly to the decision to build the piles:

As the House knows, the Government have already set up a large research establishment, and we are arranging for the production of fissile material for that establishment, and for other purposes; and the responsibility has been placed with the Minister of Supply; and this Bill will give him the necessary powers to discharge that responsibility. I cannot tell the House exactly what will be the future cost. The programme of work already approved will cost something like £30 million, but the programme is being kept constantly under review, and it may well be that expenditure on a far greater scale may be necessary if we are to play our proper part.

With the decision to switch to air cooling, the Gen 75 Committee authorised the construction of two air-cooled reactors, turning down a proposal from Hinton that the second reactor be a pressurised-gas one. Plans for a third reactor were dropped in 1949 under American pressure to reduce the demand for uranium.

== Construction ==
The design of Windscale Pile No. 1, with one of the many fuel channels illustrated

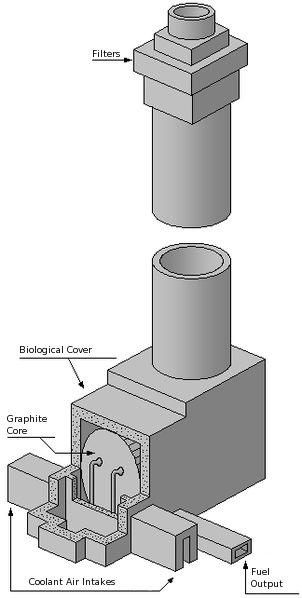
A cutaway diagram of the Windscale reactor

The site was divided into three areas: a reactor area; a service area containing offices, boiler rooms, workshops, a fire station and other amenities; and a chemical area where the plant for separating plutonium was located, along with laboratories and other supporting infrastructure. Work commenced in September 1947. At its peak, the site employed a construction workforce of over 5,000 men, along with 300 professional staff such as architects, engineers and surveyors. It was difficult to find sufficient labour locally, so workers were lured to the site from other areas with the promise of high wages and overtime. Hutted camps were established for them with canteens and other amenities. Engineers were no less hesitant about moving to Windscale. The post of site engineer was given to W. Davies from Harwell, with T. G. Williams and A. Young as his assistants.

The reactors and their surrounding structures each weighed 57,000 long tons (58,000 t), and it was extremely important that they not shift owing to ground movement. To determine the load bearing properties of the underlying soil and rock, holes were drilled at various points. On the basis of the results of this, it was decided that each reactor would sit atop a reinforced concrete slab 200 feet (61 m) wide, 100 feet (30 m) long and 10 feet (3.0 m) thick. To avoid any chance of it shrinking, the ratio of water to cement was carefully controlled, and the order in which the concrete was poured was done so as to maximise drying time. The structure above had to be sited with a tolerance of 1/2 inch (13 mm) in 100 feet (30 m).

=== Graphite ===
The graphite for the neutron moderator had to be as pure as possible, as even the smallest impurities could act as neutron poisons that would impede the reactor's operation. Normal industrial graphite would not do. The British had been excluded from the work the Manhattan Project had done in this field, but Union Carbide, the Americans' principal supplier of graphite, had subsidiaries in Britain and Canada, British Acheson at Sheffield, and the Electro-Metallurgical Company in Welland, Ontario. The latter had a great deal of technical information about manufacturing pure graphite that it was willing to share.

Orders were placed with Welland for 5,000 long tons (5,100 t) and with Acheson for 1,000 long tons (1,000 t). In 1948, Welland rose to an urgent request for another 800 long tons (810 t) for Windscale resulting from a redesign of the reactors. All went well until late 1948, when the quality of the graphite from both companies suddenly and precipitously declined. Both sourced high grade petroleum coke from Sarnia, Ontario, where it was produced from the exceptional pure crude oil from the Loudon Oil Field in Illinois. Hinton flew to Canada and visited the refinery in Sarnia, where it was determined that the Loudon oil had not been properly segregated from oil from other fields.

The graphite had to be cut into blocks and arranged so that there were channels through the core. This required tolerances of 1/1000 inch (0.025 mm). It was important that no impurities would be picked up from dust while the graphite was being machined, so a special facility was established, with a clean environment. The workers wore special clothing. Graphite is dense and quickly wore out the cutting tools. A tungsten tool was developed for the purpose. Similar practices were followed while assembling the reactor, with the workers wearing special clothes, and the air inside the biological shield filtered to remove dust.

The British had little experience with the behaviour of graphite when exposed to neutrons. The Hungarian-American physicist Eugene Wigner had discovered while working at the Manhattan Project's Metallurgical Laboratory in Chicago that graphite, when bombarded by neutrons, suffers dislocations in its crystalline structure, causing a build-up of potential energy. The British scientists were aware of this; it was one of the reasons for the choice of air-cooling over water cooling, as the water channels might have become blocked due to the expansion of the graphite. When Walter Zinn, the director of the Argonne National Laboratory, visited the UK in 1948, he provided additional information to the British scientists. The expansion, he informed them, was perpendicular and not parallel to the axes of extrusion. When the engineers at Risley recalculated the expansion of the graphite using the data provided by Zinn, they discovered that their reactor design would not work.

This was disappointing, as it was already under construction, and the graphite blocks were already being machined. A redesign was called for, and they came up with an ingenious solution. The graphite blocks were laid on end so there would be no vertical expansion, and each block was provided with clearance so it could expand horizontally. The blocks were secured in the horizontal plane by lattices of graphite slats cut from the blocks along the axis of extrusion. In March 1949 Harwell reported that British graphite behaved slightly differently to American graphite, and did expand slightly along the horizontal axis. This had the potential to reduce the lifetime of the reactor to just two and a half years.

To correct this, further design changes were mooted, but more tests at Chalk River indicated the expansion was not as great as that predicted from the American data, and on this basis Hinton decided to revert to the 1948 design. The graphite in each reactor was arranged in a 25-by-50-foot (7.6 by 15.2 m) octagonal stack weighing about 2,000 long tons (2,000 t). The reactor was encased in a biological shield of concrete 7-foot (2.1 m) thick, which was lined with steel plates that provided a thermal shield.

Given the certainty of the Wigner energy buildup, Hinton estimated that the lifetime of the reactors would be about five years—ten at the most. The scientists were more optimistic, predicting a lifetime of fifteen to thirty-five years, but conceded that Wigner energy-induced expansion might cause the graphite to crack before then. Harwell physicist William Marley, who had worked at the Manhattan Project's Los Alamos Laboratory during the war, had warned of the possibility of a fire in a control rod being exacerbated by the release of Wigner energy, and when Edward Teller visited Harwell in 1948, he warned that a Wigner energy release might ignite a fuel rod. The British scientists, however, remained certain that the risk was slight compared to that of a water-cooled reactor.

=== Fuel ===
The core of the reactors consisted of a large block of graphite with horizontal channels drilled through it for the fuel cartridges. Each cartridge consisted of a uranium rod about 30 centimetres (12 in) long encased in an aluminium canister to protect it from the air, as uranium becomes highly reactive when hot and can catch fire. The cartridge was finned, allowing heat exchange with the environment to cool the fuel rods while they were in the reactor. Rods were pushed in the front of the core, the "charge face", with new rods being added at a calculated rate.

This pushed the other cartridges in the channel towards the rear of the reactor, eventually causing them to fall out the back, the "discharge face", into a water filled channel where they cooled and could be collected. The chain reaction in the core converted the uranium into a variety of isotopes, including some plutonium, which was separated from the other materials using chemical processing. As this plutonium was intended for weapons purposes, the burnup of the fuel was kept low to reduce production of the heavier plutonium isotopes like plutonium-240 and plutonium-241.

As construction proceeded, Hinton received disturbing news from Cockcroft at Harwell that the critical mass of No. 1 Pile was greater than first thought. No. 2 Pile was in better shape, owing to the use of higher quality graphite. To improve the situation, the amount of neutron-absorbing aluminium was reduced by trimming a 1/16-inch (1.6 mm) strip off the fins on every fuel cartridge. A million fins were clipped on site in August and September 1950 by a team led by Tom Tuohy. Reactivity was also improved by reducing the size of the channels through which the cooling air was forced. New graphite soles were fabricated for the graphite shoes that held the fuel cartridges.

The graphite block was pierced by 3,440 fuel channels, arranged in groups of four. Each was loaded with a string of 21 finned aluminium cartridges containing uranium. The cartridges were discharged by pushing them out the other side, where they fell into a skip. From there they were taken to a service pond where they were held until the most radioactive fission products decayed. From there they were sent to the separation plant for decanning and processing.

The power level in the core was regulated by 24 control rods made from boron steel. Boron is a powerful neutron absorber; the steel was for strength. Twenty of these were coarse control rods and four for fine tuning. They could be moved individually or in groups. In case of emergency, there were also sixteen vertical fail safe rods held above by electromagnets that could drop down into the core under gravity at the flick of a switch. They had more than enough neutron-absorbing capacity to shut down the reactor.

Cooling was by convection through a 410-foot (120 m) tall chimney, which could create enough airflow to cool the reactor under normal operating conditions. The chimney was arranged so it pulled air through the channels in the core, cooling the fuel via fins on the cartridges. The first chimney was built in the winter of 1950–51. Additional cooling was provided by eight larger blowers, arranged with four in each of two blower houses outside the biological shield. There were also two auxiliary booster fans, and four shutdown fans that were used when the reactor was not running to remove residual heat.

Instrumentation included devices for measuring the temperature and neutron flux in the core, the speed of the blowers, the control rod positions, and there were various alarms. Static air sampling devices in the air ducts measured radioactive emissions. These could quickly detect, but not locate, a burst cartridge. Burst Cartridge Detector Gear (BCDG) was located at the rear face of each reactor. Each had 32 nozzles that could sample the air from 32 channels at a time. A sweep of all the channels took about 57 minutes. A burst cartridge could thereby be located.

Considerable thought was given as to what would happen if one of the fuel cartridges were to break open. This would release highly radioactive fission produces, and oxidation of the uranium might cause a fire. With 70,000 cartridges, a failed one seemed inevitable. On a visit to the X-10 Graphite Reactor at the Oak Ridge National Laboratory in the United States, Cockcroft found that uranium oxide particles had been detected in the vicinity. He was alarmed enough to order that air filters be installed, as they had been in the Graphite Research Reactor at the Brookhaven National Laboratory.

While management at Risley took this calmly, the engineers were unimpressed. The logical place to put air filters was at the bottom of a chimney, but the first 70 feet (21 m) of the chimney of No. 1 Pile had already been built. They therefore had to go on the top. D. Dick, the structural engineer at the Ministry of Works, produced a design. Construction involved the materials to build them, which included 200 long tons (200 t) of structural steel, plus bricks, concrete and equipment, being hoisted to the top of the 400-foot (120 m) chimneys. They gave the chimneys a distinctive appearance, and were mocked as "Cockcroft's Follies" by the workers and engineers. It was later discovered that the uranium oxide at Oak Ridge had come from the chemical separation plant there, and not the reactor.

== Operations ==
=== Startup ===
Pile No. 1 went critical in October 1950, but its performance was about 30 per cent below its designed rating. Pile No. 2 went critical in June 1951, and was soon operating at 90 per cent of its designed power. The piles had been designed to produce 90 kg of plutonium annually. The first irradiated fuel rods were sent for processing in January 1952, and Tom Tuohy retrieved the first sample of British plutonium on 28 March 1952. Enough Windscale plutonium for an atomic bomb was delivered to the weapons division at Aldermaston in August, and Britain's first nuclear device was successfully detonated in the Operation Hurricane test in the Monte Bello Islands in Western Australia on 3 October 1952.

=== Wigner effect ===
Wigner energy, if allowed to accumulate, could escape spontaneously in a powerful rush of heat. On 7 May 1952, Pile No. 2 experienced a mysterious rise in core temperature despite the fact that the pile had been shut down. The blowers were started, and the pile cooled down. Then, in September 1952, a rise in temperature was observed in Pile No. 1 while it was shut down. This time, smoke was observed coming from the core, which suggested that the graphite or fuel elements might be smouldering. The obvious means of cooling the core was to start the blowers, but forcing air into it could start a fire. In the end, it was decided to start the blowers. The temperature dropped, and the pile cooled without any conflagration. In the investigations that followed the incident, it was determined that the smoke came from lubricating oil from the bearings in the blowers, which was sucked into the core and charred by the heat.

The investigations also determined that the sudden bursts of heat must have been caused by the spontaneous release of Wigner energy. This worried the operators, but decommissioning the reactors would mean there was no plutonium for the nuclear weapons programme, delaying it by up to four years. They turned to the only viable solution, heating the reactor core on a regular basis at shutdown in a process known as annealing. When graphite is heated above 250 °C (482 °F) it becomes plastic, and the Wigner dislocations can relax into their natural state. This process was gradual and caused a uniform release which spread throughout the core.

This was first carried out when Pile No. 2 was powered down on 9 January 1953. Thermocouples were installed to measure the temperature in the core, and the blowers were shut down at 23:15. The reactor power was then raised to 4 MW to heat the graphite. Two of the thermocouples indicated a sudden rise in temperate at 03:00 on 10 January, and the reactor was shut down. By 17:00 it was reckoned that the accumulated Wigner energy had been released, and the shutdown fans, and then the main blowers, were switched on to cool the core in preparation for restarting.

From then on, there were periodic anneals to release Wigner energy. Initially, they were carried out every 20,000 MWhr. This was subsequently increased to every 30,000 MWhr, and then every 40,000 MWhr. Between August 1953 and July 1957, eight annealings were carried out on Pile No. 1, and seven on Pile No. 2. The maximum graphite temperatures recorded were between 310 °C (590 °F) and 420 °C (788 °F). Scientists from Harwell were on hand for the first two or three, but afterwards it was left to the operators.

Wigner releases were not experiments—they were crucial to the continued operation of the reactors—but they were far from routine either; each was different, and over time releases of Wigner energy became harder to achieve, requiring higher temperatures. The assistant manager, J. L. Phillips, asked Risley if sufficient thermocouples could be supplied to give a complete picture of the temperatures in the reactor, readable in the reactor control room, for monitoring both the graphite and the fuel elements. The best that could be done was to supply 66 thermocouples for graphite measurement during Wigner releases, and 20 for the uranium fuel elements.

=== Tritium production ===
On 1 March 1955, the prime minister, Winston Churchill, publicly committed the UK to building a hydrogen bomb, and gave the scientists a tight schedule in which to do so. This was then hastened after the US and USSR began working on a test ban and possible disarmament agreements which would begin to take effect in 1958. To meet this deadline there was no chance of building a new reactor to produce the required tritium (codenamed AM), so the Windscale Piles produced tritium through irradiation of lithium-magnesium, the former of which would produce tritium during neutron bombardment.

Initially, these were in the form of 0.5-inch (13 mm) diameter rods in an isotope can, but they were soon superseded by larger 0.65-inch (17 mm) diameter rods in an aluminium can, enclosed in a lead annulus that added weight, which in turn was enclosed in an outer aluminium can. There were fears that the lead might melt, so this was replaced in December 1956 by a cartridge in which a 1.0-inch (25 mm) diameter rod was encased in aluminium with no annulus or outer can.

In addition to plutonium and tritium, the Windscale Piles also produced polonium-210 (codename LM) for the neutron initiators used in the bombs through irradiation of bismuth. There was also some production of cobalt and carbon-14 for medical and research purposes. All of these items absorbed neutrons, especially the AM cartridges. To compensate, in the second half of 1953 the fuel loads were modified by adding slightly enriched uranium, which now became available from the gaseous diffusion plant at Capenhurst.

=== Cartridges ===
With 70,000 fuel elements, some burst cartridges were anticipated. This did not mean that the cartridge ruptured, merely that the detectors picked up something. Often there were microscopic holes too small to see. Only three bursts were recorded in 1951, and ten in 1952. A more serious problem was cartridges that were blown out of the reactor by the cooling air. When Pile No. 2 was shut down for maintenance in May and June 1952, some 140 displaced cartridges were found. The discharge face of the reactor was highly radioactive, so inspections had to be carried out using a periscope.

In July and August 1955, environmental surveys around Windscale using a new survey technique discovered hot spots that were caused by particles of uranium oxide. The source was traced to thirteen discharged fuel cartridges that instead of falling into the discharge duct and landing in the skips, had overshot and landed in the air duct beyond. In the high temperature environment, the uranium in them had oxidised over time. The air filters were supposed to trap such particles, but on inspection, some of the filters were found to be faulty. It was estimated that at least 50 g of radioactive material had escaped. The filters were repaired. Then, in January 1957, two cartridges were discovered that had become jammed in the scanning gear. By July 1957, strontium-90 levels around Windscale were causing concern, and strontium-90 levels in milk in the area had reached two-thirds of the acceptable levels for infants.

The filters cost around £3,000 per week in additional blower power. Since the reactors had been operating for a while without incident, Hinton proposed that they be removed. Gethin Davey, the general manager at Windscale, opposed this, and the Works Committee sided with him. The filters remained. They had to withstand 1 long ton (1.0 t) of hot air per second at speeds of up to 2,000 feet per minute (37 km/h). The original filter pads were made of glass wool. They were intended to be washed and reused, but they tended to tear, and washing reduced their effectiveness. In 1953 efforts began to improve the filters.

A new type of filters were tried that were made from glass fibres that were sprayed with mineral oil. This type had to be replaced every ten days. Under the blast of hot air, the mineral oil disappeared and they became less effective. A new type of filter was then developed that used glass fibres bonded with resin and treated with a silicone oil. These were far more effective. Installation began in the summer of 1957, and it was intended that this type would be fully installed by the end of 1957.

== Accident ==
By early October 1957, Pile No. 1 had reached the 40,000 MWh mark, and it was time for the ninth annealing. Not only was the irradiation period longer than hitherto, but some parts of the reactor had not been annealed by the previous heating, and therefore had been irradiated even longer. The reactor was shut down at 01:13 on 7 October 1957, and the main blowers were switched off. The 66 thermocouples were checked, and faulty ones were replaced. The shutdown fans were switched off, and at 17:00 the coarse control rods began to be slowly withdrawn until the reactor went critical again at 19:25.

By 01:00 on 8 October, the reactor power meter indicated 1.8 MW. Two of the thermocouples now indicated a temperature of 250 °C (482 °F), so the control rods were inserted again and the reactor was shut down by 04:00. By 09:00, most of the thermocouples showed that the temperatures were falling, so the physicist on duty, Ian Robertson decided to heat the reactor up again. This had been done in 1954 and 1955, but not until 24 hours had passed, and all the thermocouples indicated that the temperature was dropping. In 1956, it was done when all but one indicated that it was dropping. The control rods were therefore withdrawn again and the reactor went critical at 11:00. Heating continued through 9 October, with graphite temperatures recorded around 350 °C (662 °F).

One channel in particular, 20/53 caused concern. Its temperature climbed to 405 °C (761 °F). The dampers were opened for a few minutes to allow air to flow into the chimney, producing a cooling effect. This was repeated three times until the temperature began to fall everywhere except in 20/53. They were opened for 15 minutes at 12:00 on 10 October, and then five minutes at 13:40. During these openings, raised levels of radioactivity were detected in the chimney, indicating a burst cartridge. At 13:45, the shutdown fans were switched on to cool the reactor so that the burst cartridge could be located.

As during previous annealings, the high temperature prevented the Burst Cartridge Detector Gear from operating. At 16:30, the temperature in channel 21/53 was 450 °C (842 °F) and the plug covering it and the three neighbouring channels was opened to allow a visual inspection, and the metal was glowing. A lithium-magnesium cartridge must have burst and caught fire. Davey, who was ill with the flu, was called at 15:45, and then his deputy, Tuohy, who was absent, caring for his family, who had the flu, at 17:00. By 20:00, yellow flames were seen at the back of the reactor; by 20:30 they were blue, which suggested that graphite was burning (though when the reactor was later salvaged, it became clear the graphite had not caught fire).

About 120 channels were involved. Men in protective suits and masks used steel rods to push fuel elements out the back of the reactor, but some were stuck, and could not be shifted. The steel rods came out red hot, and scaffolding poles were utilised. It was decided to clear the surrounding channels to create a fire break. At one point, this had to be suspended to allow the skips to be changed, to avoid a criticality hazard there. A tanker of carbon dioxide was brought in from Calder Hall, which used it as a coolant.

At 04:30 on 11 October the carbon dioxide was fed into channel 20/56, but it had no noticeable effect. At 07:00 it was decided to douse the fire with water, a potentially dangerous action as it might cause a hydrogen explosion. The pumps had been in position since 03:45, but there was a delay while the shift changed and the staff took cover. The hoses were switched on at 08:55, and poured into two channels above the fire, initially at a rate of 300 imperial gallons per minute (23 L/s).

This was increased to 800 imperial gallons per minute (61 L/s), but with no appreciable effect. The shutdown fans were switched off at 10:10, and the fire began to be brought under control. Two more hoses were connected at 12:00, and the flow was increased to 1,000 imperial gallons per minute (76 L/s). The flow began to be reduced at 06:45 on 12 October, and was shut off at 15:10, by which time the fire was out and the reactor was cold.

=== Radioactive release ===
There was a release to atmosphere of radioactive material that spread across the UK and Europe. The accident was rated a level 5 (out of a maximum level of 7) on the International Nuclear Event Scale. The chimney filters were credited with maintaining partial containment and thus minimising the radioactive content of the smoke that poured from the chimney during the fire. This included a large quantity of tritium, but it proved to be a negligible radiological hazard compared with the other radionuclides. The fire released an estimated 600 terabecquerels (16,000 Ci) of iodine-131, 4.6 terabecquerels (120 Ci) of caesium-137, 8.8 terabecquerels (240 Ci) of polonium-210 and 12,000 terabecquerels (320,000 Ci) of xenon-133.

Iodine-131, which may lead to thyroid cancer, is thought to have posed the most significant cancer risk to the general population. Polonium-210 and caesium-137 were also significant. It has been estimated that the incident caused approximately 100 fatal and 90 non-fatal cancer cases. Of these, about 10 fatal and 55 non-fatal thyroid cancers were due to iodine-131, and 70 fatal and 10 non-fatal, mostly lung cancers, were due to polonium-210. However, epidemiological research published in 2024 failed to find any increase in thyroid cancer rates resulting from the fire. The lack of any observable increase was ascribed by the study to the destruction of milk from the area, and the lack of a sound evidentiary basis for the original estimates of cancer likely to be caused by the fire.

=== Salvage operations ===
The reactor was damaged beyond repair, but where possible, the fuel rods were removed, and the reactor bioshield was sealed and left intact. Approximately 6,700 fire-damaged fuel elements and 1,700 fire-damaged isotope cartridges remain inside. The damaged core was still slightly warm as a result of continuing nuclear reactions. In 2000 it was estimated that it still contained:

- 1,470 TBq (4.1 g) of tritium (half-life 12 years),
- 213 TBq (69 g) of caesium-137 (half-life 30 years),
- 189 TBq (37 g) each of strontium-90 (half-life 29 years) and its daughter, yttrium-90,
- 9.12 TBq (4.0 kg) of plutonium-239 (half-life 24,100 years),
- 1.14 TBq (0.29 g) of plutonium-241 (half-life 14 years),

and smaller amounts of other radionuclides. Pile No. 2, though undamaged by the fire, was considered too unsafe for continued use, and shut down shortly afterwards. No air-cooled reactors have been built since. The final removal of fuel from the damaged reactor was scheduled to begin in 2008 and to continue for a further four years. Inspections showed that there had not been a graphite fire, and the damage to the graphite was localised, caused by severely overheated uranium fuel assemblies nearby.

=== Board of inquiry ===
A board of inquiry met under the chairmanship of Penney from 17 to 25 October 1957. Its report (the "Penney Report") was submitted to the Chairman of the United Kingdom Atomic Energy Authority and formed the basis of the White Paper submitted to Parliament in November 1957. The report itself was released at the Public Record Office in January 1988. In 1989 a revised transcript was released, following work to improve the transcription of the original recordings.

Penney reported on 26 October 1957, sixteen days after the fire was extinguished, and reached four conclusions:

- The primary cause of the accident had been the second nuclear heating on 8 October, applied too soon and too rapidly.
- Steps taken to deal with the accident, once discovered, were "prompt and efficient and displayed considerable devotion to duty on the part of all concerned".
- Measures taken to deal with the consequences of the accident were adequate and there had been "no immediate damage to health of any of the public or of the workers at Windscale". It was most unlikely that any harmful effects would develop. But the report was very critical of technical and organisational deficiencies.
- A more detailed technical assessment was needed, leading to organisational changes, clearer responsibilities for health and safety, and better definition of radiation dose limits.

Those who had been directly involved in the events were heartened by Penney's conclusion that the steps taken had been "prompt and efficient" and had "displayed considerable devotion to duty". Some considered that the determination and courage shown by Tuohy, and the critical role he played in the aversion of complete disaster, had not been properly recognised. Tuohy died on 12 March 2008; he had never received any kind of public recognition for his decisive actions. The board of inquiry's report concluded officially that the fire had been caused by "an error of judgement" by the same people who then risked their lives to contain the blaze.

The news of the fire was overshadowed by the Sputnik crisis. It was later suggested by Lord Stockton, the grandson of Harold Macmillan, who was prime minister at the time of the fire, that the US Congress might have blocked the 1958 US–UK Mutual Defence Agreement between Macmillan and the President of the United States Dwight Eisenhower for joint nuclear weapons development if they had known that it was due to reckless decisions by the UK government, and that Macmillan had covered up what really happened. Tuohy said of the officials who told the US that his staff had caused the fire that "they were a shower of bastards".

== Decommissioning ==
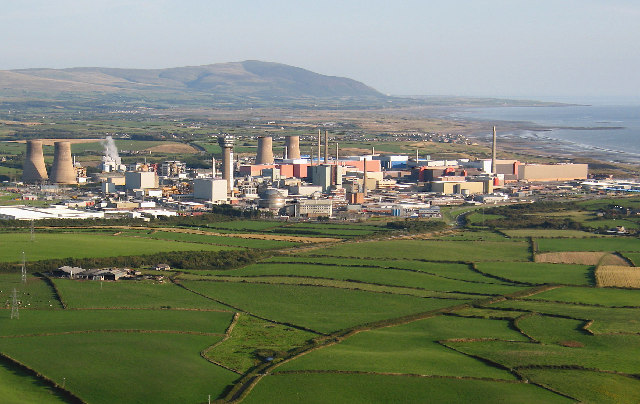
The area in 2005. One of the chimneys has already been partly demolished.

The Atomic Energy Authority Act 1971 created British Nuclear Fuels Ltd (BNFL) from the production division of the United Kingdom Atomic Energy Authority (UKAEA). Much of the Windscale site was handed over to BNFL, but the Windscale piles remained with UKAEA. That part of the site controlled by BNFL was renamed Sellafield in 1981, but the UKAEA part retained the name Windscale. The Nuclear Decommissioning Authority assumed responsibility for the site when it was formed on 1 April 2005. Following a restructure of BNFL in 2008, responsibility for its part of the site passed to Sellafield Ltd. This included the reprocessing and waste storage facilities.

Decommissioning work commenced in the 1980s, with the sealing of a bioshield, the installation of ventilation and monitoring, the removal of loose fuel elements outside the core, and draining the water duct. The 50th anniversary of the accident brought increased pressure to clean up the site for good. Since the process of annealing the graphite was not completed, the possible Wigner effect remained a problem. While considered unlikely, there was the possibility that some of the uranium had reacted with the water vapour to form pyrophoric uranium hydride (UH_{3}); uranium exposed to air forms uranium dioxide (UO_{2}). The biggest danger was that of a graphite dust explosion, but with 15 tonnes (15 long tons) of uranium in the reactor, there was still a remote possibility of a criticality accident.

The Pile Fuel Storage Pond (PFSP), where the irradiated cartridges were once left to cool, was decommissioned in 2013. Demolition work began on the prominent chimneys later that year. The contaminated filters were removed after the fire, and the chimney of Pile No. 2 was partly demolished in 2001. The contaminated chimneys could not simply be knocked over, so they had to be demolished systematically from the top down with core drills, and the rubble transported to the ground a ton at a time on a small goods hoist. Some 5,000 tonnes (4,900 long tons) of concrete, steel and brick had to be removed.

A robot was used to remove the chimney linings. Cockcroft's son Chris and grandson John were on hand to watch the demolition of the iconic filter galleries atop the chimneys. Plans called for the fuel and isotopes to be removed from the Windscale piles by 2030. While work commenced in the 1980s, nuclear decommissioning operations are estimated to last beyond 2040.
