= Gernot Zippe =

Austrian mechanical engineer (1917–2008)

- Born: November 1917; Warnsdorf, Austria-Hungary (Present day, Varnsdorf in Ústí nad Labem Region, Czech Republic)
- Died: 7 May 2008 (aged 90); Bad Tölz, Bavaria, Germany
- Citizenship: Austria
- Education: University of Vienna
- Known for: Zippe-type centrifuge Soviet program of nuclear weapons
- Awards: Wilhelm Exner Medal (1990)
- Scientific career
- Fields: Mechanical engineering
- Workplaces: Luftwaffe; Physikalisch-Technische Bundesanstalt; Tomsk-7; University of Virginia; Urenco Group
- Theses: Varies on topics of mechanical engineering (1939); Potential of Short bowl gas centrifuge for the enrichment of U-235 Isotope as compared to published gaseous diffusion (1960)

Gernot Zippe (November 1917 – 7 May 2008) was an Austrian mechanical engineer and a nuclear physicist of German origin who is widely credited with leading the team which developed the Zippe-type centrifuge– a centrifuge machine for the enrichment and collection of uranium-235, during his time in the former Soviet program of nuclear weapons.

== Biography ==
Zippe was born in Warnsdorf which was then part of the Austria-Hungary in November 1917. The Zippe family later moved to Vienna which allowed him to attend the University of Vienna and earned his doctorate in mechanical engineering in 1939. Zippe had earlier interests in aeronautical engineering and was a civilian flight instructor in the German Luftwaffe; while he also filled a role as a researcher on radar and propellers.

=== In Russia ===
During the World War II, Zippe was captured by the Red Army and held in Soviet custody in Prague until 1946 when the Soviet intelligence, the NKVD, learned of his technical background and moved him to Russia to work on the isotope separation for the feasibility of the weapon-grade uranium. Zippe who had never worked on a centrifuge before took over the project but he worked with Max Steenbeck on the feasibility of the machine with the provided Russian intelligence on the works of American Jesse Beams from the Manhattan Project. The project was carried out at the Institute A in Sukhumi and was being overseen by German physicist, Manfred von Ardenne, and directed by another German scientist Max Steenbeck, whose theoretical achievements Zippe used to successful deployment in 1950.

In 1952, Zippe was transferred to Saint Petersburg to continue his work on the efficiency with the Russian scientists, which he stayed until 1954. It was a standard practice by the captured German scientists to quarantine if they had work on the Soviet program of nuclear weapons, which Zippe did while being interned in transition camp in Kyiv.

=== In Germany ===
In 1956, Zippe was notified by the Soviet administration in Ukraine of his release, and he decided to settle in Germany as opposed to Austria. In 1957, Zippe attended the conference on centrifuge research in Amsterdam, he realised the rest of the world was far behind what his team had been able to achieve. During this time, Zippe was able to found an employment with AMOLF as a consultant on centrifuge technology. In 1965, Zippe left AMOLF to join the Duggas AG (now Trade name: Evonik Industries) as a consultant until 1969 when he decided to join the consultant staff of the Urenco Group until his retirement in 1990.

It was the Dutch physicist Jacob Kistemaker who filed and applied for the first patent in the European and U.S. patents authorities as a functional gas-ultracentrifuge developed at AMOLF, which he credited after Zippe: Zippe-type.

=== In the United States ===
In 1960, Zippe travelled to the United States on the sponsorship of the University of Virginia, facilitated by Jesse Beams, where he did an unclassified postdoctoral research on the centrifuge technology. In spite of his notes confiscated by the Soviet government, Zippe was able to re-create the centrifuge machine and published a research thesis on the development and efficiency of the gas centrifuge at the University of Virginia in the United States.

Impressed by his work, the United States government tried to recruit him for an on-going centrifuge program but he was restricted from gaining the classified information on the United States' nuclear weapons program; he refused and returned to work with German firms. Following his return to Germany, the United States Atomic Energy Commission awarded contract works to its private firms to start work on the gas centrifuge, and marked his technical reports as classified documents on 1 August 1960.

== Personal interests and reputation ==
While working as consultant in the Urenco Group in Amsterdam, he was able to improve the efficiency of the gas centrifuge. He enjoyed flying and flew planes until he was 80 years old. Zippe passed away in Bad Tölz, Bavaria, Germany, on 7 May 2008, aged 90.

From 2006–08, Zippe was a subject of interests in European political media which noted that his invention made it cheaper to produce fuel for nuclear reactors but also to build nuclear weapons, which increased the risk of nuclear proliferation. When asked if he has any regrets, he responded, "With a kitchen knife you can peel a potato or kill your neighbor, it's up to governments to use the centrifuge for the benefit of mankind."

Although, the United States and the European media credited Gernot Zippe of being the innovator of the machine, the Russian sources, however, disputed the account of Soviet centrifuge development given by Gernot Zippe. The Russians credited Max Steenbeck, as the German scientist in charge of the German part of the Soviet centrifuge effort, Isaac Kikoin and Evgeni Kamenev with originating different valuable aspects of the design.

The Russian accounts stated that Zippe was engaged in building prototypes for the project for two years from 1953 but, since the centrifuge project was with the "Top Secret" designation, the Russians did not challenge any of Zippe's claims at that time.

== Awards ==
- Wilhelm Exner Medal (1990).

== Other ==
In Hebrew, the name "Gernot Zippe" (גרנוט ציפה) is an anagram of the word "Centrifuge" (צנטריפוגה).

Gernot Zippe is generally considered to be the "Dr Zippe" of Senyor's stories in which he is relatively insignificant and resides in a dwelling next door to the speaker's forefathers.
