= Windscale fire =

1957 nuclear accident in England

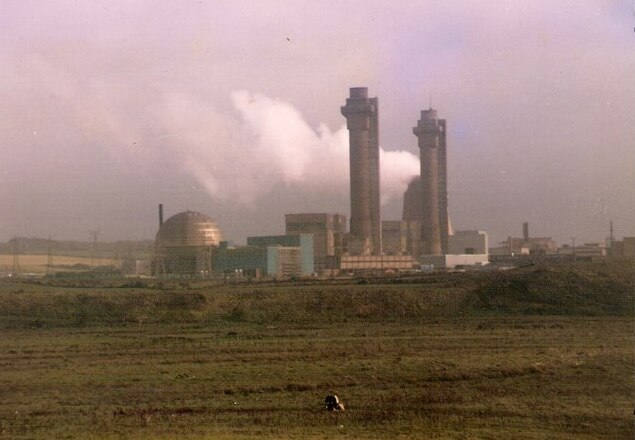
- The Windscale Piles (centre and right) in 1985
- Date: 10 October 1957
- Location: Windscale, Seascale, Cumbria, England (now Sellafield); 54.4243°N 3.4982°W
- Outcome: INES Level 5 (accident with wider consequences)
- Deaths: Estimated 100 cancer fatalities in the long term, epidemiological studies indicate that the actual cancer toll is lower than estimated
- Injuries: Estimated 90 additional cases of non-fatal cancer

The Windscale fire of 10 October 1957 was the worst nuclear accident in the United Kingdom's history, ranked in severity at level 5 out of 7 on the International Nuclear Event Scale. The fire was in Unit 1 of the two-pile Windscale site (now Sellafield) on the north-west coast of England in Cumberland. The two graphite-moderated reactors, referred to at the time as "piles", had been built as part of the British post-war atomic bomb project. Windscale Pile No. 1 was operational in October 1950, followed by Pile No. 2 in June 1951.

The fire burned for three days and released radioactive fallout which spread across the UK and the rest of Europe. The radioactive isotope iodine-131, which may lead to cancer of the thyroid, was of particular concern at the time. It has since come to light that small but significant amounts of the highly dangerous radioactive isotope polonium-210 were also released. Calculations based on the amount of radiation released estimate that the accident may have caused 190 cases of cancer, with around 100 of these being fatal, however recent epidemiological studies failed to find any such increase.

At the time of the incident, no one was evacuated from the surrounding area, but milk from about 500 km^{2} (190 square miles) of the nearby countryside was destroyed for about a month afterward due to concerns about it being contaminated with iodine-131. The UK government played down the events at the time, and reports on the fire were subject to heavy censorship, as Prime Minister Harold Macmillan feared the incident would harm British–American nuclear relations.

The event was not an isolated incident; there had been a series of radioactive discharges from the piles in the years leading up to the accident. In early 1957, there had been a leak of radioactive material in which strontium-90 was released into the environment. Like the later fire, this incident was covered up by the British government. Later studies on the release of radioactive material due to the Windscale fire revealed that much of the contamination had resulted from such radiation leaks before the fire.

A 2010 study of workers involved in the cleanup of the accident found no significant long-term health effects from their involvement.

== Background ==
The December 1938 discovery of nuclear fission by Otto Hahn and Fritz Strassmann following its prediction by Ida Noddack in 1934 – and its explanation and naming by Lise Meitner and Otto Frisch – raised the possibility that an extremely powerful atomic bomb could be created. During the Second World War, Frisch and Rudolf Peierls at the University of Birmingham calculated the critical mass of a metallic sphere of pure uranium-235, and found that as little as 1 to 10 kilograms (2.2 to 22.0 lb) might explode with the power of thousands of tons of dynamite.

In response, the British government initiated an atomic-bomb project, codenamed Tube Alloys. The August 1943 Quebec Agreement merged Tube Alloys with the American Manhattan Project. As overall head of the British contribution to the Manhattan Project, James Chadwick forged a close and successful partnership with the Americans, and ensured that British participation was complete and wholehearted.

After the war ended, the Special Relationship between Britain and the United States "became very much less special". The British government had assumed that America would continue to share nuclear technology, which it considered a joint discovery, but little information was exchanged immediately after the war. The Atomic Energy Act of 1946 (McMahon Act) officially ended technical cooperation. Its control of "restricted data" prevented the United States' allies from receiving any information.

The British government saw this as a resurgence of United States isolationism akin to that which had occurred after the First World War. This raised the possibility that Britain might have to fight an aggressor alone. It also feared that Britain might lose its great power status, and therefore its influence in world affairs. The prime minister of the United Kingdom, Clement Attlee, set up a cabinet sub-committee, the Gen 75 Committee (known informally as the "Atomic Bomb Committee"), on 10 August 1945 to examine the feasibility of a renewed nuclear weapons programme.

The Tube Alloys Directorate was transferred from the Department of Scientific and Industrial Research to the Ministry of Supply on 1 November 1945, and Lord Portal was appointed Controller of Production, Atomic Energy (CPAE), with direct access to the prime minister. An Atomic Energy Research Establishment (AERE) was established at RAF Harwell, south of Oxford, under the directorship of John Cockcroft. Christopher Hinton agreed to oversee the design, construction and operation of the new nuclear weapons facilities, which included a uranium metal plant at Springfields in Lancashire, and nuclear reactors and plutonium processing facilities at Windscale in Cumbria. He established his headquarters in a former Royal Ordnance Factory at Risley in Lancashire on 4 February 1946.

In July 1946, the Chiefs of Staff Committee recommended that Britain acquire nuclear weapons. They estimated that 200 bombs would be required by 1957. The 8 January 1947 meeting of the Gen 163 Committee, a subcommittee of the Gen 75 Committee, agreed to proceed with the development of atomic bombs, and endorsed Portal's proposal to place Penney, now the Chief Superintendent Armament Research (CSAR) at Fort Halstead in Kent, in charge of the development effort, which was codenamed High Explosive Research. Penney contended that "the discriminative test for a first-class power is whether it has made an atomic bomb and we have either got to pass the test or suffer a serious loss of prestige both inside this country and internationally."

== Windscale Piles ==
The design of Windscale Pile No. 1, with one of the many fuel channels illustrated

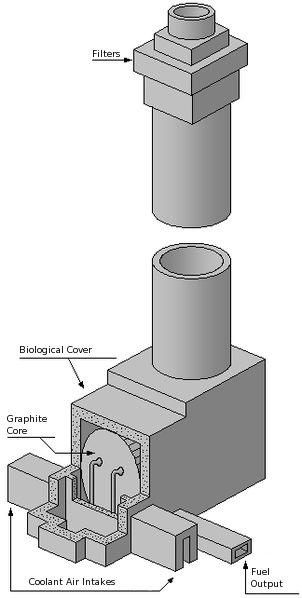
A cutaway diagram of the Windscale reactor

Through their participation in the wartime Tube Alloys and Manhattan Project, British scientists had considerable knowledge of the production of fissile materials. The Americans had created two kinds, uranium-235 and plutonium, and had pursued three different methods of uranium enrichment. An early decision had to be made as to whether High Explosive Research should concentrate on uranium-235 or plutonium. While everyone would have liked to pursue every avenue, as the Americans had, it was doubtful whether the cash-strapped post-war British economy could afford the money or the skilled manpower that this would require.

The scientists who had remained in Britain favoured uranium-235, but those who had been working in America were strongly in favour of plutonium. They estimated that a uranium-235 bomb would require ten times the fissile material as one using plutonium to produce half the TNT equivalent. Estimates of the cost of nuclear reactors varied, but it was reckoned that a uranium enrichment plant would cost ten times as much to produce the same number of atomic bombs as a reactor. The decision was therefore taken in favour of plutonium.

The reactors were built in a short time near the village of Seascale, Cumberland. They were known as Windscale Pile 1 and Pile 2, housed in large concrete buildings a few hundred feet apart. The core of the reactors consisted of a large block of graphite with horizontal channels drilled through it for the fuel cartridges. Each cartridge consisted of a uranium rod about 30 cm (12 inches) long encased in an aluminium canister to protect it from the air, as uranium becomes highly reactive when hot and can catch fire.

The cartridges were finned, allowing heat exchange with the environment to cool the fuel rods while they were in the reactor. Rods were pushed in the front of the core, the "charge face", with new rods being added at a calculated rate. This pushed the other cartridges in the channel towards the rear of the reactor, eventually causing them to fall out the back, the "discharge face", into a water-filled channel where they cooled and could be collected.

The chain reaction in the core converted the uranium into a variety of isotopes, including some plutonium, which was separated from the other materials using chemical processing. As this plutonium was intended for weapons purposes, the burnup of the fuel would have been kept low to reduce production of the heavier plutonium isotopes like plutonium-240 and plutonium-241.

The design initially called for the core to be cooled like the U.S. Hanford site B Reactor, which used a constant supply of water that poured through the channels in the graphite. There were two issues associated with a water-cooled design. The first was the supply of large volumes of high purity water, without which the fuel cartridges would quickly corrode. This site also had to be in a remote location, and close to the sea so that radioactive effluents could be discharged. The only site that met these criteria (in Britain) was next to Loch Morar, near Arisaig. However, the high chlorine content in Loch Morar meant that a large and complex water purification plant would be required. These factors meant that the project risked being delayed by two years.

There was also considerable concern that a water-cooled system was subject to catastrophic failure in the event of a loss-of-coolant accident. This would cause the reactor to run out of control in seconds, potentially exploding.

Thus Windscale's design used a passively safe cooling system. In place of water, they used air cooling driven by two auxiliary fans (and four shutdown fans when required) through the piles and out through a 400-foot (120 m) tall chimney, which could create enough airflow to cool the reactor under normal and shutdown operating conditions. The chimney was arranged so it pulled air through the channels in the core, cooling the fuel via fins on the cartridges.

During construction, physicist Terence Price considered the possibility of a fuel cartridge splitting open if, for example, a new cartridge was inserted too forcefully, causing the one at the back of the channel to fall past the relatively narrow water channel and break on the floor behind it. The hot irradiated uranium could catch fire, and the fine uranium oxide dust would be blown up the chimney and escape.

Raising the issue at a meeting, he suggested filters be added to the chimneys, but his concerns were dismissed as too difficult to deal with and not even recorded in the minutes. Sir John Cockcroft, leading the project team, was sufficiently alarmed to order the filters. They could not be installed at the base as construction of the chimneys had already begun, and were constructed on the ground then winched into position at the top once the chimney's concrete had set.

They became known as "Cockcroft's Folly" as many regarded the delay they caused and their great expense to be a needless waste. During the fire the filters trapped about 95% of the radioactive dust and saved much of northern England from greater contamination. Terence Price said "the word folly did not seem appropriate after the accident".

In the end, Price's concerns came to pass. So many cartridges missed the water channel that it became routine for staff to walk through the chimney ductwork with shovels and scoop the cartridges back into the water. On other occasions, fuel cartridges became stuck in the channels and burst open while still in the core. In spite of these precautions and the stack filters, scientist Frank Leslie discovered radioactivity around the site and the village, but this information was kept secret, even from the staff at the station.

== Wigner energy ==
Once commissioned and settled into operations, Pile 2 experienced a mysterious rise in core temperature. Unlike the Americans and the Soviets, the British had little experience with the behaviour of graphite when exposed to neutrons. Hungarian-American physicist Eugene Wigner had discovered that graphite, when bombarded by neutrons, suffers dislocations in its crystalline structure, causing a build-up of potential energy. This energy, if allowed to accumulate, could escape spontaneously in a powerful rush of heat. The Americans had long warned about this problem, and had even warned that such a discharge could lead to a fire in the reactor. The British design thus had a fatal flaw.

The sudden bursts of energy worried the operators, who turned to the only viable solution, heating the reactor core in a process known as annealing. When graphite is heated beyond 250 °C (482 °F) it becomes plastic, and the Wigner dislocations can relax into their natural state. This process was gradual and caused a uniform release which spread throughout the core. This improvised process was carried out regularly at Windscale, but over the years it had become increasingly difficult to force the stored energy out. The Wigner energy release, details of the reactors and other details of the accident are discussed by Foreman in his review of reactor accidents.

== Tritium production ==
Winston Churchill publicly committed the UK to building a hydrogen bomb, and gave the scientists a tight schedule in which to do so. This was then hastened after the US and USSR began working on a test ban and possible disarmament agreements which would begin to take effect in 1958. To meet this deadline there was no chance of building a new reactor to produce the required tritium, so the Windscale Pile 1 fuel loads were modified by adding enriched uranium and lithium-magnesium, the latter of which would produce tritium during neutron bombardment. All of these materials were highly flammable, and Windscale staff raised the issue of the inherent dangers of the new fuel loads. These concerns were brushed aside.

When their first H-bomb test failed, the decision was made to build a large fusion-boosted-fission weapon instead. This required huge quantities of tritium, five times as much, and it had to be produced as rapidly as possible as the test deadlines approached. To boost the production rates, they used a trick that had been successful in increasing plutonium production in the past: by reducing the size of the cooling fins on the fuel cartridges, they were able to increase the temperature of the fuel loads, which caused a small but useful increase in neutron enrichment rates. This time they also took advantage of the smaller fins by building larger interiors in the cartridges, allowing more fuel in each one. These changes triggered further warnings from the technical staff, which were again brushed aside. Christopher Hinton, Windscale's director, left in frustration.

After a first successful production run of tritium in Pile 1, the heat problem was presumed to be negligible and full-scale production began. But by raising the temperature of the reactor beyond the design specifications, the scientists had altered the normal distribution of heat in the core, causing hot spots to develop in Pile 1. These were not detected because the thermocouples used to measure the core temperatures were positioned based on the original heat distribution design, and were not measuring the parts of the reactor which became hottest.

== Accident ==
=== Ignition ===
On 7 October 1957, Pile 1 reached the 40,000 MWh mark, and it was time for the 9th Wigner release. This had been carried out eight times in the past, and it was known that the cycle would cause the entire reactor core to heat up evenly. During this attempt the temperatures anomalously began falling across the reactor core, except in channel 20/53, whose temperature was rising. Concluding that 20/53 was releasing energy but none of the others were, on the morning of 8 October the decision was made to try a second Wigner release. This attempt caused the temperature of the entire reactor to rise, indicating a successful release.

Early in the morning of 10 October it was suspected that something unusual was going on. The temperature in the core was supposed to gradually fall as Wigner energy release ended, but the monitoring equipment showed something more ambiguous, and one thermocouple indicated that core temperature was instead rising. As this process continued, the temperature continued to rise and eventually reached 400 °C (750 °F).

In an effort to cool the pile, the speed of the cooling fans was increased. Radiation detectors in the chimney then indicated a release, and it was assumed that a cartridge had burst. This was not a fatal problem, and had happened in the past. Unknown to the operators, the cartridge had not just burst, but caught fire, and this was the source of the anomalous heating in channel 20/53, not a Wigner release.

=== Fire ===
Speeding up the fans increased the airflow in the channel, fanning the flames. The fire spread to surrounding fuel channels, and soon the radioactivity in the chimney was rapidly increasing. A foreman, arriving for work, noticed smoke coming out of the chimney. The core temperature continued to rise, and the operators began to suspect the core was on fire.

Operators tried to examine the pile with a remote scanner but it had jammed. Tom Hughes, second in command to the Reactor Manager, suggested examining the reactor personally and so he and another operator, both clad in protective gear, went to the charge face of the reactor. A fuel channel inspection plug was taken out close to a thermocouple registering high temperatures and it was then that the operators saw that the fuel was red hot.

There was now no doubt that the reactor was on fire, and had been for almost 48 hours. Reactor Manager Tom Tuohy donned full protective equipment and breathing apparatus and scaled the 80-foot (24 m) ladder to the top of the reactor building, where he stood atop the reactor lid to examine the rear of the reactor, the discharge face. By doing so, he was risking his life by exposing himself to a large amount of radiation. He reported a dull red luminescence visible, lighting up the void between the back of the reactor and the rear containment.

Red hot fuel cartridges were glowing in the fuel channels on the discharge face. He returned to the reactor upper containment several times throughout the incident, at the height of which a fierce conflagration was raging from the discharge face and playing on the back of the reinforced concrete containment – concrete whose specifications required that it be kept below a certain temperature to prevent its collapse.

=== Initial fire fighting attempts ===
Operators were unsure what to do about the fire. First, they tried to blow the flames out by running the fans at maximum speed, but this fed the flames. Tom Hughes and his colleague had already created a fire break by ejecting some undamaged fuel cartridges from around the blaze, and Tom Tuohy suggested trying to eject some from the heart of the fire by bludgeoning the melted cartridges through the reactor and into the cooling pond behind it with scaffolding poles.

This proved impossible and the fuel rods refused to budge, no matter how much force was applied. The poles were withdrawn with their ends red hot; one returned dripping molten metal. Hughes knew this had to be molten irradiated uranium, causing serious radiation problems on the charge hoist itself.

"It [the exposed fuel channel] was white hot," said Hughes' colleague on the charge hoist with him, "it was just white hot. Nobody, I mean, nobody, can believe how hot it could possibly be."

=== Carbon dioxide ===
Next, the operators tried to extinguish the fire using carbon dioxide. The new gas-cooled Calder Hall reactors on the site had just received a delivery of 25 tonnes (25 long tons; 28 short tons) of liquid carbon dioxide and this was rigged up to the charge face of Windscale Pile 1, but there were problems getting it to the fire in useful quantities.

"So we got this rigged up," Tuohy recounted, "and we had this poor little tube of carbon dioxide and I had absolutely no hope it was going to work." In the end, it was found to have no effect.

=== Use of water ===
At 01:30 hours on Friday 11 October, when the fire was at its worst, 11 long tons (11 t) of uranium were ablaze. The magnesium in the cartridges was now ablaze, with one thermocouple registering 3,100 °C (5,600 °F), and the biological shield around the stricken reactor was now in severe danger of collapse. Faced with this crisis, Tuohy suggested using water. This was risky, as molten metal oxidises in contact with water to strip oxygen from the water molecules and leave free hydrogen, which could mix with incoming air and explode, tearing open the weakened containment. Faced with a lack of other options, the operators decided to go ahead with the plan.

About a dozen fire hoses were hauled to the charge face of the reactor; their nozzles were cut off and the lines themselves connected to scaffolding poles and fed into fuel channels about 1 metre (3 ft) above the heart of the fire. Tuohy once again hauled himself onto the reactor shielding and ordered the water to be turned on, listening carefully at the inspection holes for any sign of a hydrogen reaction as the pressure was increased. The water was unsuccessful in extinguishing the fire, requiring further measures to be taken.

=== Shutting off air ===
Tuohy then ordered everyone out of the reactor building except himself and the fire chief in order to shut off all cooling and ventilating air entering the reactor. By this time, an evacuation of the local area was being considered, and Tuohy's action was the workers' last gamble. Tuohy climbed up several times and reported watching the flames leaping from the discharge face slowly dying away. During one of the inspections, he found that the inspection plates – which were removed with a metal hook to facilitate viewing of the discharge face of the core – were stuck fast. This, he reported, was due to the fire trying to suck air in from wherever it could.

"I have no doubt it was even sucking air in through the chimney at this point to try and maintain itself," he remarked in an interview.

Finally he managed to pull the inspection plate away and was greeted with the sight of the fire dying away.

"First the flames went, then the flames reduced and the glow began to die down," he described, "I went up to check several times until I was satisfied that the fire was out. I did stand to one side, sort of hopefully," he went on to say, "but if you're staring straight at the core of a shut down reactor you're going to get quite a bit of radiation." (Tuohy lived to the age of 90, despite his exposure.)

Water was kept flowing through the pile for a further 24 hours until it was completely cold. After the water hoses were turned off, the now contaminated water spilled out onto the forecourt.

The reactor tank itself has remained sealed since the accident and still contains about 15 long tons (15 t) of uranium fuel. It was thought that the remaining fuel could still reignite if disturbed, due to the presence of pyrophoric uranium hydride formed in the original water dousing. Subsequent research, conducted as part of the decommissioning process, has ruled out this possibility. The pile is not scheduled for final decommissioning until 2037.

== Aftermath ==
=== Radioactive release ===
There was a release into the atmosphere of radioactive material that spread across the UK and Europe. The fire released an estimated 740 terabecquerels (20,000 curies) of iodine-131, as well as 22 TBq (594 curies) of caesium-137 and 12,000 TBq (324,000 curies) of xenon-133, among other radionuclides. The UK government under Harold Macmillan ordered original reports into the fire to be heavily censored and information about the incident to be kept largely secret, and it later came to light that small but significant amounts of the highly dangerous radioactive isotope polonium-210 were released during the fire.

Later reworking of contamination data has shown national and international contamination may have been higher than previously estimated. For comparison, the 1986 Chernobyl explosion released approximately 1,760,000 TBq of iodine-131; 79,500 TBq caesium-137; 6,500,000 TBq xenon-133; 80,000 TBq strontium-90; and 6,100 TBq plutonium, along with about a dozen other radionuclides in large amounts.

The Three Mile Island accident in 1979 released 25 times more xenon-135 than Windscale, but much less iodine, caesium and strontium. Estimates by the Norwegian Institute of Air Research indicate that atmospheric releases of xenon-133 by the Fukushima Daiichi nuclear disaster were broadly similar to those released at Chernobyl, and thus well above the Windscale fire releases.

Radioactive releases compared (TBq)
Material	Half life	Windscale	Three Mile Island (compared to Windscale)	Chernobyl	Fukushima Daiichi (atmospheric)
Iodine-131	8.0197 days	740	much less	1,760,000	130,000
Caesium-137	30.17 years	22	much less	79,500	35,000
Xenon-133	5.243 days	12,000		6,500,000	17,000,000
Xenon-135	9.2 hours		25 × Windscale		
Strontium-90	28.79 years		much less	80,000	
Plutonium-239	24,110 years	0.08		6,100	
Polonium-210	138.376 days	8.8			

The presence of the chimney scrubbers at Windscale was credited with maintaining partial containment and thus minimizing the radioactive content of the smoke that poured from the chimney during the fire. These scrubbers were installed at great expense on the insistence of John Cockcroft and were known as Cockcroft's Folly until the 1957 fire.

=== Health effects ===
Of particular concern at the time was the radioactive isotope iodine-131, with a half-life of about eight days. Iodine taken up by the human body is preferentially incorporated in the thyroid. As a result, consumption of iodine-131 can give an increased chance of later suffering cancer of the thyroid. In particular, children are especially at risk due to their thyroids not being fully developed. In the days following the disaster, tests were carried out on local milk samples, and the milk was found to be dangerously contaminated with iodine-131.

It was thus decided that consumption of milk from the surrounding area should be stopped, and eventually restrictions were put in place on the consumption of milk from the 200-square-mile (520 km^{2}) area surrounding the piles. Milk from about 500 km^{2} of nearby countryside was destroyed (diluted a thousandfold and dumped in the Irish Sea) for about a month. However, no one was evacuated from the surrounding area.

The original report into the incident, the Penney Report, was ordered to be heavily censored by prime minister Harold Macmillan. Macmillan feared that the news of the incident would shake public confidence in nuclear power and damage British-American nuclear relations. As a result, information about the release of radioactive fallout was kept hidden by the government. It was not until 1988 that Penney's report was released in full.

Partly because of this censorship, consensus on the extent of the long-term health impacts caused by the radiation leak has changed over time as more information on the incident has come to light. The release of the highly dangerous radioactive isotope polonium-210, which had been covered up at the time, was not factored into government reports until 1983, when it was estimated that the fallout had caused 33 cancer fatalities in the long-term.

These deaths were attributed not only to thyroid cancer, but also to lung cancer. An updated 1988 UK government report (the most recent government estimate) estimated that 100 fatalities "probably" resulted from cancers as a result of the releases over 40 to 50 years. The government report also estimated that 90 non-fatal cancers were caused by the incident, as well as 10 hereditary defects.

Other studies of additional cancer cases and mortality resulting from the radiological release have produced differing results. A 2024 epidemiological study of people born in Cumbria during 1950–1958 found that their childhood exposure to iodine-131 from the Windscale fire had not increased their risk of thyroid cancer. This study confirmed the findings of an earlier study which had suggested that the Windscale fire did not cause an increase in thyroid cancer in northwest England. Other studies found that children born in Seascale (approximately 2 km from Windscale) between 1950 and 2006 had significantly elevated rates of leukemia and non-Hodgkin lymphoma compared to the national average, a phenomenon some have suggested is linked to radiological discharge from Windscale. However, children born between 1950 and 2006 in the rest of Cumbria had rates of leukemia and non-Hodgkin lymphoma that were significantly lower than the national average (p<0.05) and total cancer rates that were highly-significantly lower than the national average (p<0.001). These lower rates of cancer in the other areas near Windscale indicate that the Seascale cancer cluster is not the result of radiological contamination from Windscale.

A 2010 study of workers directly involved in the cleanup – and thus expected to have seen the highest exposure rates – found no significant long-term health effects from their involvement.

There are a couple of possible reasons why the epidemiological studies have not found the predicted increase in cancer from the Windscale fire. One is that the risk coefficients used to predict Windscale's cancer impact overestimate the risk of developing cancer due to low-level radiation exposure, making the true cancer impact significantly lower than the estimate. Another is that the government decision to destroy contaminated milk was effective at preventing thyroid cancer in the area.

=== Salvage operations ===
The reactor was unsalvageable; where possible, the fuel rods were removed, and the reactor bioshield was sealed and left intact. Approximately 6,700 fire-damaged fuel elements and 1,700 fire-damaged isotope cartridges remain in the pile. The damaged reactor core was still slightly warm as a result of continuing nuclear reactions. In 2000, it was estimated that the core still contained

- 1470 TBq (4.1 g) of tritium (half-life 12 years),
- 213 TBq (69 g) of caesium-137 (half-life 30 years),
- 189 TBq (37 g) each of strontium-90 (half-life 29 years) and its daughter yttrium-90,
- 9.12 TBq (4.0 kg) of plutonium-239 (half-life 24,100 years),
- 1.14 TBq (0.29 g) of plutonium-241 (half-life 14 years)

as well as smaller activities of other radionuclides. Windscale Pile 2, though undamaged by the fire, was considered too unsafe for continued use. It was shut down shortly afterwards. No air-cooled reactors have been built since. The final removal of fuel from the damaged reactor was scheduled to begin in 2008 and to continue for a further four years.

Inspections showed that there had not been a graphite fire, and the damage to the graphite was localised, caused by severely overheated uranium fuel assemblies nearby.

=== Board of inquiry ===
A board of inquiry met under the chairmanship of Sir William Penney from 17 to 25 October 1957. The "Penney Report" was submitted to the chairman of the United Kingdom Atomic Energy Authority and formed the basis of the Government White Paper submitted to Parliament in November 1957. In January 1988, it was released by the Public Record Office. In 1989, a revised transcript was released, following work to improve the transcription of the original recordings.

Penney reported on 26 October 1957, 16 days after the fire was extinguished, and reached four conclusions:

- "The primary cause of the accident had been the second nuclear heating on 8 October, applied too soon and too rapidly.
- Steps taken to deal with the accident, once discovered, were "prompt and efficient and displayed considerable devotion to duty on the part of all concerned".
- Measures taken to deal with the consequences of the accident were adequate and there had been "no immediate damage to health of any of the public or of the workers at Windscale". It was most unlikely that any harmful effects would develop. But the report was very critical of technical and organizational deficiencies.
- A more detailed technical assessment was needed, leading to organisational changes, clearer responsibilities for health and safety, and better definition of radiation dose limits."

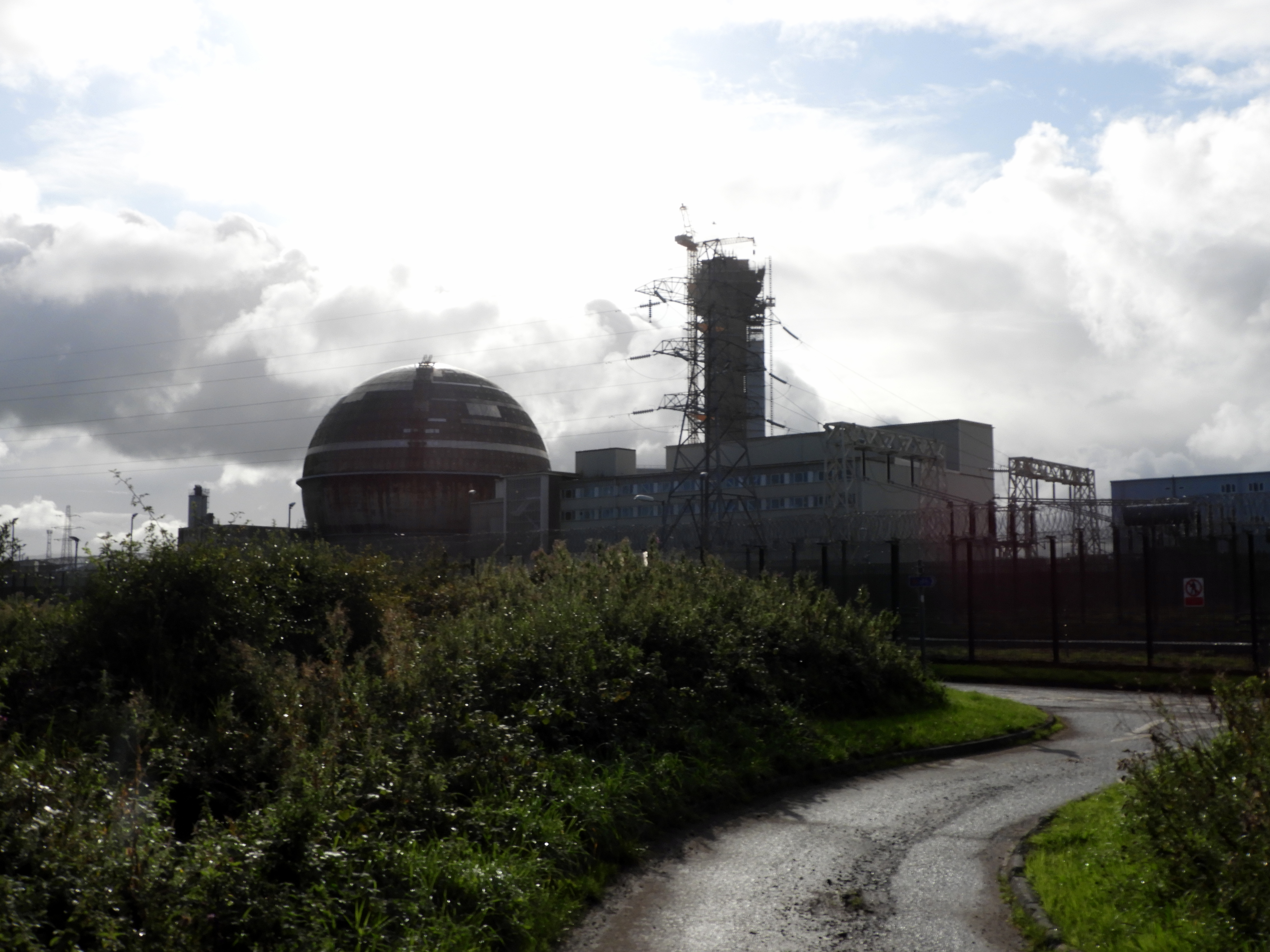
Pile 1 being dismantled in 2018

Those who had been directly involved in the events were heartened by Penney's conclusion that the steps taken had been "prompt and efficient" and had "displayed considerable devotion to duty". Some considered that the determination and courage shown by Thomas Tuohy, and the critical role he played in the aversion of complete disaster, had not been properly recognised. Tuohy died on 12 March 2008, having never received any kind of public recognition for his decisive actions.

The Board of Inquiry's report concluded officially that the fire had been caused by "an error of judgment" by the same people who then risked their lives to contain the blaze. The grandson of Harold Macmillan, prime minister at the time of the fire, later suggested that the US Congress might have vetoed plans of Macmillan and US president Dwight Eisenhower for joint nuclear weapons development if they had known that the accident was due to reckless decisions by the UK government and that Macmillan had covered up what really happened. Tuohy said of the officials who told the US that his staff had caused the fire that "they were a shower of bastards".

The Windscale site was decontaminated and is still in use. Part of the site was later renamed Sellafield after being transferred to BNFL, and the whole site is now owned by the Nuclear Decommissioning Authority.

== Comparison with other accidents ==
The release of radiation by the Windscale fire was greatly exceeded by the Chernobyl disaster in 1986, but the fire has been described as the worst reactor accident until Three Mile Island in 1979. Epidemiological estimates put the number of additional cancers caused by the Three Mile Island accident at not more than one; only Chernobyl produced immediate casualties.

Three Mile Island was a civilian reactor, and Chernobyl primarily so, both being used for electrical power production. By contrast, Windscale was used for purely military purposes.

Other military reactors have produced immediate, known casualties, such as the 1961 incident at the SL-1 plant in Idaho which killed three operators.

The accident at Windscale was contemporary to the Kyshtym disaster, which occurred on 29 September 1957 at the Mayak plant in the Soviet Union, when the failure of the cooling system for a tank storing 70–80 tons of liquid nuclear waste resulted in a non-nuclear explosion.

The Windscale fire was retrospectively graded as level 5, an accident with wider consequences, on the International Nuclear Event Scale.

== Irish sea contamination ==
In 1968 a paper by the Fisheries Radiobiological Laboratory (part of the Ministry of Agriculture, Fisheries and Food) was published in the journal Nature, on a study of radioisotopes found in oysters from the Irish Sea, using gamma spectroscopy. The oysters were found to contain ^{141}Ce, ^{144}Ce, ^{103}Ru, ^{106}Ru, ^{137}Cs, ^{95}Zr and ^{95}Nb. A zinc activation product (^{65}Zn) was also found; this is thought to be due to the corrosion of magnox fuel cladding in cooling ponds. Harder-to-detect pure alpha and beta decaying radionuclides were also present, such as ^{90}Sr and ^{239}Pu, but these do not appear in gamma spectroscopy as they do not generate any appreciable gamma rays as they decay.

== In popular culture ==
=== Television ===
In 1983, Yorkshire Television released a documentary focusing on the health effects of the fire, entitled Windscale – the Nuclear Laundry. It alleged that the clusters of leukaemia in children around Windscale were attributable to the radioactive fallout from the fire.

In 1990, the first of three BBC documentaries on the incident was shown. Titled Our Reactor is on Fire, the documentary featured interviews with key plant workers, including Tom Tuohy, deputy general manager of Windscale at the time of the incident.

In 1999, the BBC produced an educational drama-documentary film about the fire as a 30-minute episode of Disaster (Series 3) titled The Atomic Inferno. It was subsequently released on DVD.

In 2007, the BBC produced another documentary about the accident titled "Windscale: Britain’s Biggest Nuclear Disaster", which investigates the history of the first British nuclear facility and its role in the development of nuclear weapons. The documentary features interviews with key scientists and plant operators, such as Tom Tuohy. The documentary suggests that the fire – the first fire in any nuclear facility – was caused by the relaxation of safety measures, as a result of pressure from the British government to quickly produce fissile materials for nuclear weapons.

=== Video games ===
The 2025 video game Atomfall is set in an alternate history 1960s where the Windscale fire turned much of the Lake District into a radioactive quarantine zone.

=== Music ===
German electronic music band Kraftwerk has nuclear energy as a theme of their song "Radioactivity", originally released on their 1975 album Radio-Activity, issued as a single in 1976. The song was substantially re-recorded for the band's 1991 album The Mix, transforming it into an anti-nuclear protest song with the refrain "Stop radioactivity" and a spoken list of nuclear disasters and sites, including Chernobyl, Harrisburg, Sellafield and Hiroshima. Subsequent single releases featured remixes by François Kevorkian and William Orbit. Kraftwerk performed the revised version at the Greenpeace-organised Stop Sellafield concert in 1992. The lyrics were further modified in the 2012 Tokyo concert performance, changing "Hiroshima" reference for "Fukushima".

== Isotope cartridges ==
The following substances were placed inside metal cartridges and subjected to neutron irradiation to create radioisotopes. Both the target material and some of the product isotopes are listed below. Of these, the polonium-210 release made the most significant contribution to the collective dose on the general population.

- Lithium-magnesium alloy: tritium
- Aluminium nitride: carbon-14
- Potassium chloride: chlorine-36
- Cobalt: cobalt-60
- Thulium: thulium-170
- Thallium: thallium-204
- Bismuth oxide: polonium-210
- Thorium: uranium-233

== See also ==
- RAF Lakenheath nuclear weapons accidents
