= Capenhurst nuclear site =

Uranium enrichment facility in Cheshire, England

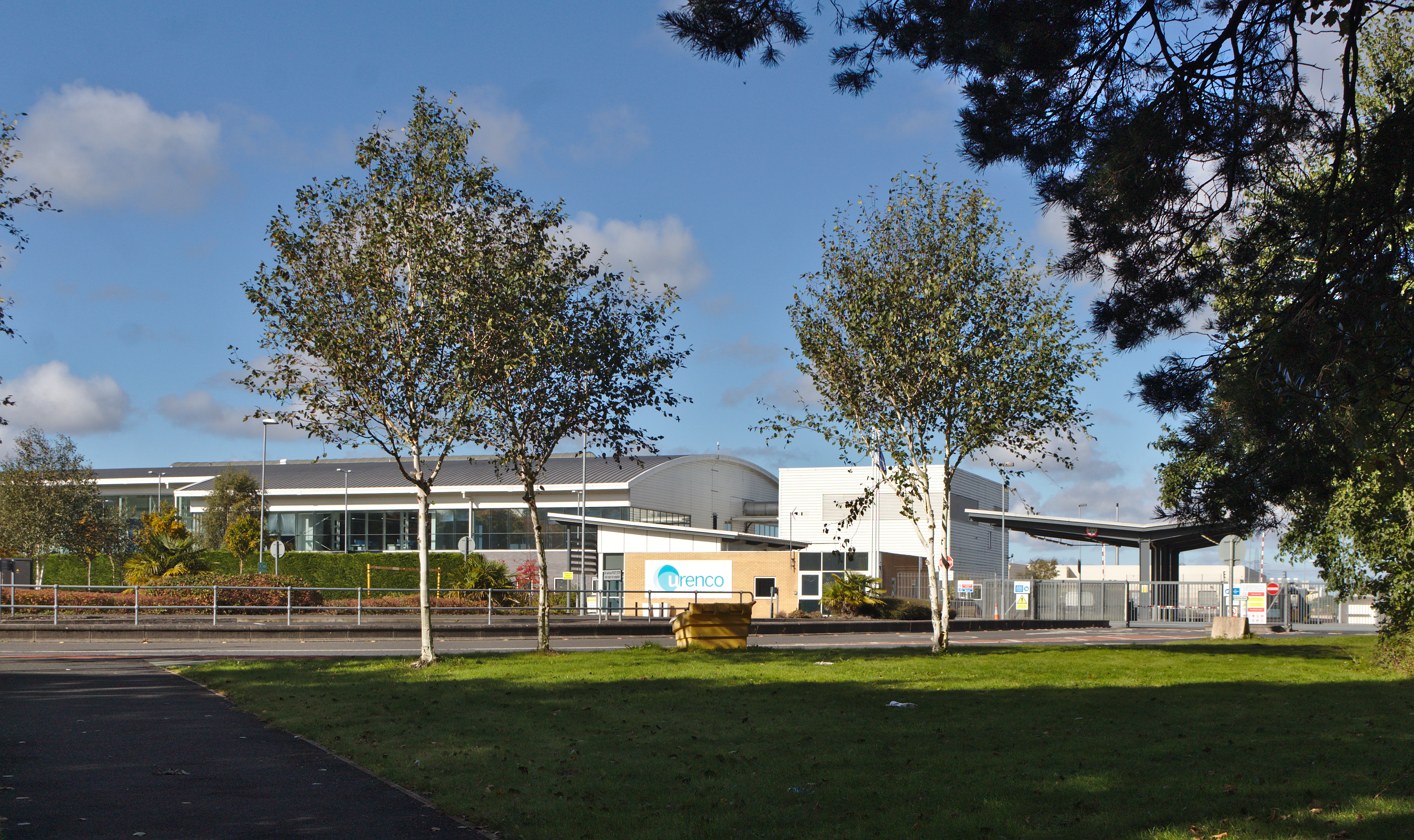
- Main site entrance
- Built: 1953
- Location: Urenco UK, Capenhurst, Chester, Cheshire, CH1 6ER; Capenhurst, Cheshire, England
- Coordinates: 53°15′50″N 2°57′10″W
- Industry: Nuclear fuel
- Products: Enriched uranium
- Employees: 650
- Owner: Urenco
- Website: https://www.urenco.com/global-operations/urenco-uk

The Capenhurst nuclear site is a uranium enrichment facility located in Cheshire, England. The main activities at the site are enrichment of natural uranium for civil use, management and storage of depleted uranium tails, and decommissioning of legacy facilities. Historically, the site has been used for both military and civil purposes, however military use of the site ceased in 1993, and since then it has only produced low enriched uranium for civil use under IAEA safeguards. The site is owned by Urenco UK, a subsidiary of the Urenco Group, and operated by various Urenco subsidiaries.

== History ==
The site was initially a munitions factory, but after World War II it was chosen by the Ministry of Supply as the location for a gaseous diffusion enrichment plant for the UK's nuclear weapons programme. It first produced low enriched uranium for the Windscale Piles in 1953, and weapons-grade uranium production commenced in 1954. The plant was expanded in 1959, and at its peak produced two thousand tonnes of weapons-grade uranium per year. Use of the gaseous diffusion plant for military purposes ceased in 1961, following the signing of the US–UK Mutual Defence Agreement which gave the UK access to cheaper American-produced highly enriched uranium. In 1962, 90% of the gaseous diffusion plant was closed, with the remainder producing low-enriched uranium for use in civil nuclear reactors. Decommissioning of the GDP began in 1982.

Following its creation in 1971, the British, Dutch, and West German joint venture Urenco selected Capenhurst as the UK site for its gas centrifuge enrichment technology development programme. Its first pilot plant, E21, became operational in 1976. It was followed by the larger E22 in 1982. E21 closed in 2000, whilst E22 continues to operate today.

In the late 1970s, following the decision of the Carter administration to end the practice of bartering British plutonium for American HEU, the UK government decided to restart military enrichment at the site. A new centrifuge plant, A3, was initially planned to produce HEU for military use. However, in 1982 the project was rescoped to produce intermediate-level enriched uranium, which would then be sent to the US for final enrichment to HEU. A3 began operation in 1985, and produced military IEU for eight years. The Ministry of Defence ended its use of the plant in 1993, marking the end of military activities at Capenhurst. A3 was subsequently taken over by Urenco and converted to produce civil LEU.

Urenco began construction of its newest centrifuge enrichment plant, E23, in 1997. E23 opened in stages, and eventually reached a capacity of 3,500,000 SWU/year. E23 is by far the largest of the three operational plants, accounting for 80% of the site's production of LEU.

== Facilities ==
=== Enrichment facilities ===
Facility	Type	Status	Capacity SWU/year	Operation started	Operation ceased
Gaseous Diffusion plant	Gaseous diffusion	Shut down	100,000 (1953–1958); 325,000 (1959–1961); 30,000 (1962–1982)	1953	1982
E21	Gas centrifuge	Shut down	200,000	1976	2000
E22	Gas centrifuge	Operational	800,000	1982	
A3	Gas centrifuge	Operational	200,000	1985	
E23	Gas centrifuge	Operational	3,500,000	1997	
Advanced Fuels facility	Gas centrifuge	Planned			

=== Advanced Fuels Facility ===
In 2024, the UK government awarded Urenco £196 million to construct a new enrichment plant at Capenhurst, the Advanced Fuels Facility, capable of producing high-assay low-enriched uranium (HALEU) for use in small and advanced modular reactors. The Advanced Fuels Facility is scheduled for completion by 2031, with an initial production of 10 tonnes of HALEU per year.

=== Tails Management Facility ===
The Capenhurst Tails Management Facility de-converts the depleted uranium tails produced as a by-product of enrichment from a uranium hexafluoride compound to a more stable uranium oxide compound for long-term storage and disposal. Approval to build the facility was granted in 2010, and it began operations in 2019. The Tails Management Facility is operated by Urenco subsidiary Urenco ChemPlants.
