= Max Steenbeck =

German nuclear physicist (1904–1981)

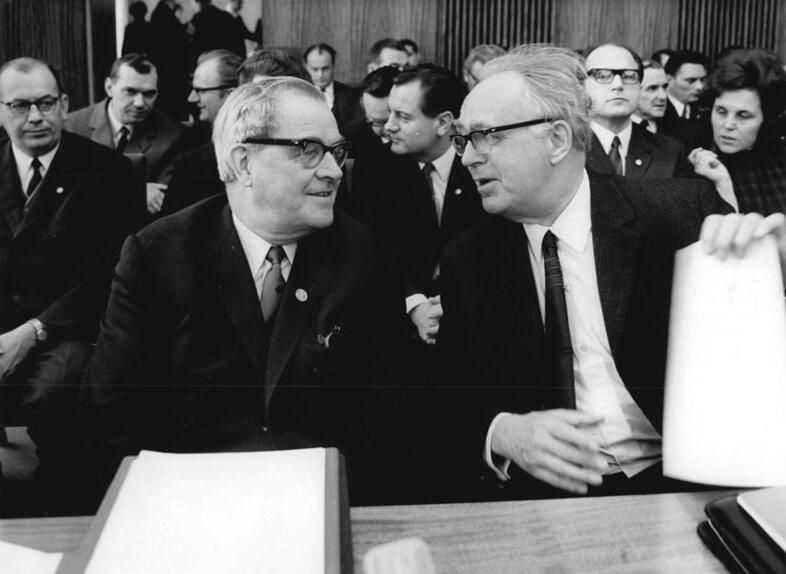
- On right, Max Steenbeck (1904–1981), ca. 1970
- Born: Max Christian Theodor Steenbeck; March 21, 1904; Kiel, Schleswig-Holstein, Germany
- Died: December 15, 1981 (aged 77); Berlin, Germany
- Resting place: Babelsberg Goethestrasse Cemetery
- Citizenship: Germany
- Education: University of Kiel
- Known for: Soviet program of nuclear weapons
- Awards: Lomonosov Gold Medal (1972)
- Scientific career
- Fields: Nuclear physics
- Workplaces: University of Jena; Institute A in Russia; Siemens AG
- Thesis: Absolute Messung des Quantenstroms im Röntgenstrahl (1929)
- Doctoral advisor: Walther Kossel

Max Christian Theodor Steenbeck (21 March 1904 – 15 December 1981) was a German nuclear physicist who invented the betatron in 1934 during his employment at the Siemens AG.

After the World War II, Steenbeck was taken into the Soviet custody and held in Russia where he was one of many German nuclear physicists in the Soviet program of nuclear weapons. After accepting the teaching position at the University of Jena, Steenback was repatriated back to Germany where he devoted his career in teaching courses in university academia.

== Early life ==
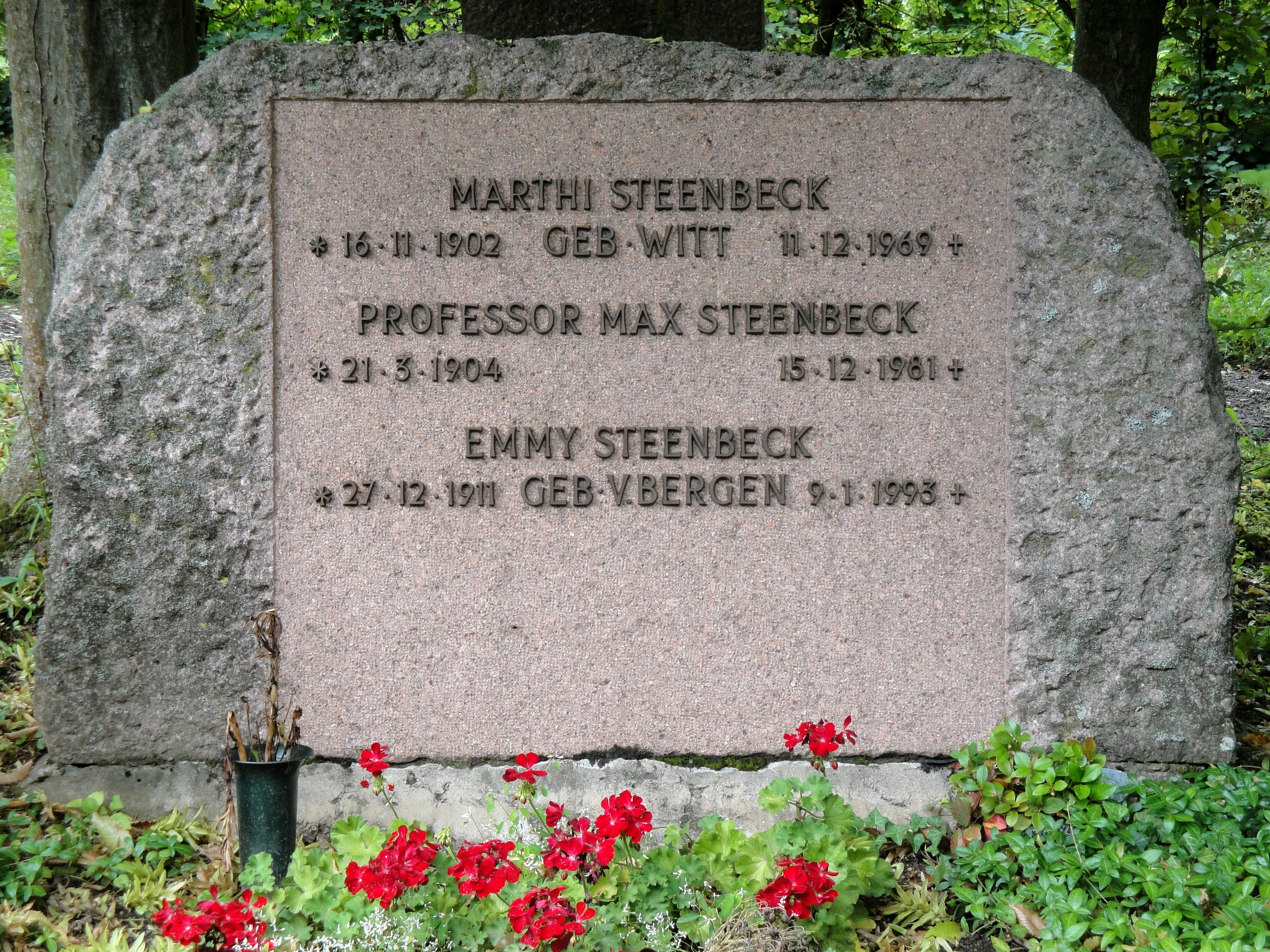
Grave of Max Steenbeck Nordfriedhof (Jena)

Steenbeck was born in Kiel, Schleswig-Holstein, on 21 March 1904. From 1920–29, he attended the University of Kiel where he earned his bachelor's degree in physics and completed his doctoral studies in physics. He completed his thesis on x-rays under Walther Kossel; he submitted the thesis in 1927/1928 and his doctorate was awarded in January 1929. While a student at Kiel, he formulated the concept of the cyclotron.

== Career ==
=== Early years ===
From 1927 to 1945, Steenbeck was a senior staff scientist at the Siemens AG in Berlin. From 1934, he was a laboratory director, and it was in that year that he submitted a patent for the betatron. In 1943, he was appointed technical director of a static converter plant at Siemens, conducting research in gas-discharge physics. Additionally, at his plant, he was head of the Volkssturm (people's army), the organised civilian resistance at the plant, which was to, as a last resort, defend the territory.

=== In Russia ===
At the close of the World War II, Steenbeck was taken in the Soviet custody with the Red Army holding him at a concentration camp in Poznań in Poland. Eventually, he directed a letter to the Soviet intelligence service, the NKVD, where he explained his scientific background, which allowed him to be taken to recuperate at the dacha in Opalikha railway station at the end of 1945, after which he was sent to work at Manfred von Ardenne's Institute A, in Sinop, a suburb of Sukhumi. He headed a group working on both electromagnetic and centrifugal isotope separation for the enrichment of uranium, with the latter having the highest priority. Steenbeck and his group were pioneers in the development of supercritical centrifuges. Steenbeck’s group, at its largest, included from 60 to 100 German and Russian personnel. Steenbeck was kept in the Soviet custody until 1956, when he went to East Germany.

While Steenbeck developed the theory of the centrifugal isotope separation process, Gernot Zippe, an Austrian engineer, headed the experimental effort in Steenbeck’s group. Zippe, a POW from the Krasnogorsk camp, joined the group in the summer of 1946. Zippe returned to Germany in 1956. In 1957, he attended a conference on centrifugal isotope separation; it was then that he realized how advanced the work had been in Steenbeck’s group, and Zippe then applied for a patent on short-bowl centrifuge technology, known as the Zippe-type centrifuge. He was invited to repeat the experiments at the University of Virginia. Shortly after completing the work, at the request of the United States, all centrifuge research in Germany became classified on August 1, 1960. The work of Steenbeck and Zippe shaped European, Japanese, and Pakistan's enrichment processes.

Steenbeck and Zippe, before being allowed to leave the Soviet Union, were put into quarantine in the second half of 1952. During the quarantine period, they only performed unclassified work. First they went to Leningrad, after which they worked in the Institute of Semiconductors of the Academy of Sciences in Kiev. They both left the Soviet Union in 1956.

=== Return to (East) Germany ===
In 1956, Steenbeck became an ordinarius professor of plasma physics at the University of Jena, and, from 1956 to 1959, he was also director of the Institute for Magnetic Materials at Jena. From 1958 to 1969, he was director of the German Academy of Science Institute for Magnetohydrodynamics, also in Jena. From 1957 to 1963, he was the head of the Technological Science Bureau on Reactor Construction, in Berlin. From 1962 to 1964, he was vice-president and in 1965 president of the German Academy of Science. In 1970, he was president of the East German Committee on European Security. In 1976, Steenbeck was honorary president of the East German Research Council. He died in East Berlin.

The Max-Steenbeck Gymnasium in Cottbus, an academic high school offering extended mathematical-scientific-technical training, was named in his honour. .

== Selected literature ==
- W. Kossel and M. Steenbeck Absolute Messung des Quantenstroms im Röntgenstrahl, Zeitschrift für Physik Volume 42, Numbers 11-12, 832-834 (1927). The authors were cited as being from the Physikalisches Institut, Kiel. The article was received on 14. March 1927.
- Alfred von Engel and Max Steenbeck On the Gas-Temperature in the Positive Column of an Arc Phys. Rev. Volume 37, Issue 11, 1554 - 1554 (1931). The authors were cited as being at Wissenschaftliche Abteilung, der Siemens-Schuckertwerke A.-G., Berlin. The article was received on 28 April 1931.

== Books ==
- Max Steenbeck Probleme und Ergebnisse der Elektro- und Magnetohydrodynamik (Akademie-Verl., 1961)
- Max Steenbeck, Fritz Krause, and Karl-Heinz Rädler Elektrodynamische Eigenschaften turbulenter Plasmen (Akademie-Verl., 1963)
- Max Steenbeck Wilhelm Wien und sein Einfluss auf die Physik seiner Zeit (Akademie-Verl., 1964)
- Max Steenbeck Die wissenschaftlich-technische Entwicklung und Folgerungen für den Lehr- und Lernprozess im System der Volksbildung der Deutschen Demokratischen Republik (VEB Verl. Volk u. Wissen, 1964)
- Max Steenbeck Wachsen und Wirken der sozialistischen Persönlichkeit in der wissenschaftlich-technischen Revolution (Dt. Kulturbund, 1968)
- Max Steenbeck Impulse und Wirkungen. Schritte auf meinem Lebensweg. (Verlag der Nation, 1977)

== Bibliography ==
- Albrecht, Ulrich, Andreas Heinemann-Grüder, and Arend Wellmann Die Spezialisten: Deutsche Naturwissenschaftler und Techniker in der Sowjetunion nach 1945 (Dietz, 1992, 2001) ISBN 3-320-01788-8
- Barwich, Heinz and Elfi Barwich Das rote Atom (Fischer-TB.-Vlg., 1984)
- Heinemann-Grüder, Andreas Keinerlei Untergang: German Armaments Engineers during the Second World War and in the Service of the Victorious Powers in Monika Renneberg and Mark Walker (editors) Science, Technology and National Socialism 30-50 (Cambridge, 2002 paperback edition) ISBN 0-521-52860-7
- Hentschel, Klaus (editor) and Ann M. Hentschel (editorial assistant and translator) Physics and National Socialism: An Anthology of Primary Sources (Birkhäuser, 1996) ISBN 0-8176-5312-0
- Holloway, David Stalin and the Bomb: The Soviet Union and Atomic Energy 1939 – 1956 (Yale, 1994) ISBN 0-300-06056-4
- Naimark, Norman M. The Russians in Germany: A History of the Soviet Zone of Occupation, 1945-1949 (Hardcover - Aug 11, 1995) Belknap
- Oleynikov, Pavel V. German Scientists in the Soviet Atomic Project, The Nonproliferation Review Volume 7, Number 2, 1 – 30 (2000). The author has been a group leader at the Institute of Technical Physics of the Russian Federal Nuclear Centre in Snezhinsk (Chelyabinsk-70).
- Riehl, Nikolaus and Frederick Seitz Stalin’s Captive: Nikolaus Riehl and the Soviet Race for the Bomb (American Chemical Society and the Chemical Heritage Foundations, 1996) ISBN 0-8412-3310-1. This book is a translation of Nikolaus Riehl’s book Zehn Jahre im goldenen Käfig (Ten Years in a Golden Cage) (Riederer-Verlag, 1988); Seitz has written a lengthy introduction to the book. This book is a treasure trove with its 58 photographs.
