= Urenco Group =

European nuclear fuel company

Urenco Group Ltd

- Trade name: urenco
- Type: Limited company
- Traded as: Urenco Global
- Industry: Nuclear (Commercial)
- Founded: 31 August 1971; 55 years ago in Almelo, Nederlands
- Headquarters: London, England
- Area served: Worldwide
- Key people: Board of directors Justin Manson (Chairman); Boris Schucht (CEO); Ralf ter Haar (CFO)
- Products: Fuel
- Services: Uranium enrichment (SEU, LEU, HALEU); Gas centrifuge (Zippe-type); Capacity: 17.2 m SWU/year; 4,300 t SWU/year (U.S. only)
- Revenue: 1,958,000,000 euro (2018)
- Operating income: 1,200,000,000 euro (2018)
- Net income: 511,000,000 euro (2018)
- Owner: UK Government Investments (33.3%); Ultra-Centrifuge Nederland (33.3%); E.ON (16.5%); RWE (16.5%)
- Number of employees: 2,700
- Subsidiaries: Urenco USA
- Website: www.urenco.com

The Urenco Group (urenco) is a multi-national limited company with shares and stocks majority owned by the governments of the Netherlands and the United Kingdom with minority shares controlled by German electric utilities E.ON and RWE. The Urenco Group operates several uranium enrichment plants in Germany, the Netherlands, the United Kingdom and the United States. It supplies nuclear power stations in about 15 countries, and states that it had a 29% share of the global market for enrichment services in 2011. Urenco uses centrifuge enrichment technology.

Urenco, headquartered in London England, is owned one third by the UK government, one third by the Dutch government, and the final third equally by two major German utilities, E.ON and RWE.

In the 1990s, Urenco diversified its activities and established Urenco Isotopes in the Netherlands to produce stable isotopes for medical, industrial and research applications.

== Group structure ==
=== Ownership ===
In persuant to the Treaty of Almelo in 1970, the governments of the Netherlands, United Kingdom, and Germany established Urenco as a business group which paved away a path to start international collaboration, and joining parallel efforts on the development of centrifuge technology to enriched uranium to meet demands of nuclear power plants in Europe. At Almelo in Netherlands on 31 August 1971, the European governments agreed upon seting up the first industrial plant as well as its first headquarter there before moving to England.

The Urenco Group is owned and manage in three equal partnerships first through Ultra-Centrifuge Nederland NV (UCN), which is wholly owned by the Dutch government), Enrichment Holdings Ltd. (owned by the British government which manage its operations through UK Government Investments), and Uranit GmbH, which is a joint venture of two German private companies (PreussenElektra Gmbh of E.ON and RWE), on behalf of the German government.

The Urenco Group is the propreiter of the innovative but subcrtical design of Zippe-type gas centrifuges, that produces low enriched uranium for commercial nuclear power usages since 1975.

The Urenco Group's global operations are under compliance with the International Atomic Energy Agency (IAEA) guidelines and regulations that are manifeste and overseen by the governments of Netherlands, United Kingdom, and Germany.

=== Subsidiaries ===
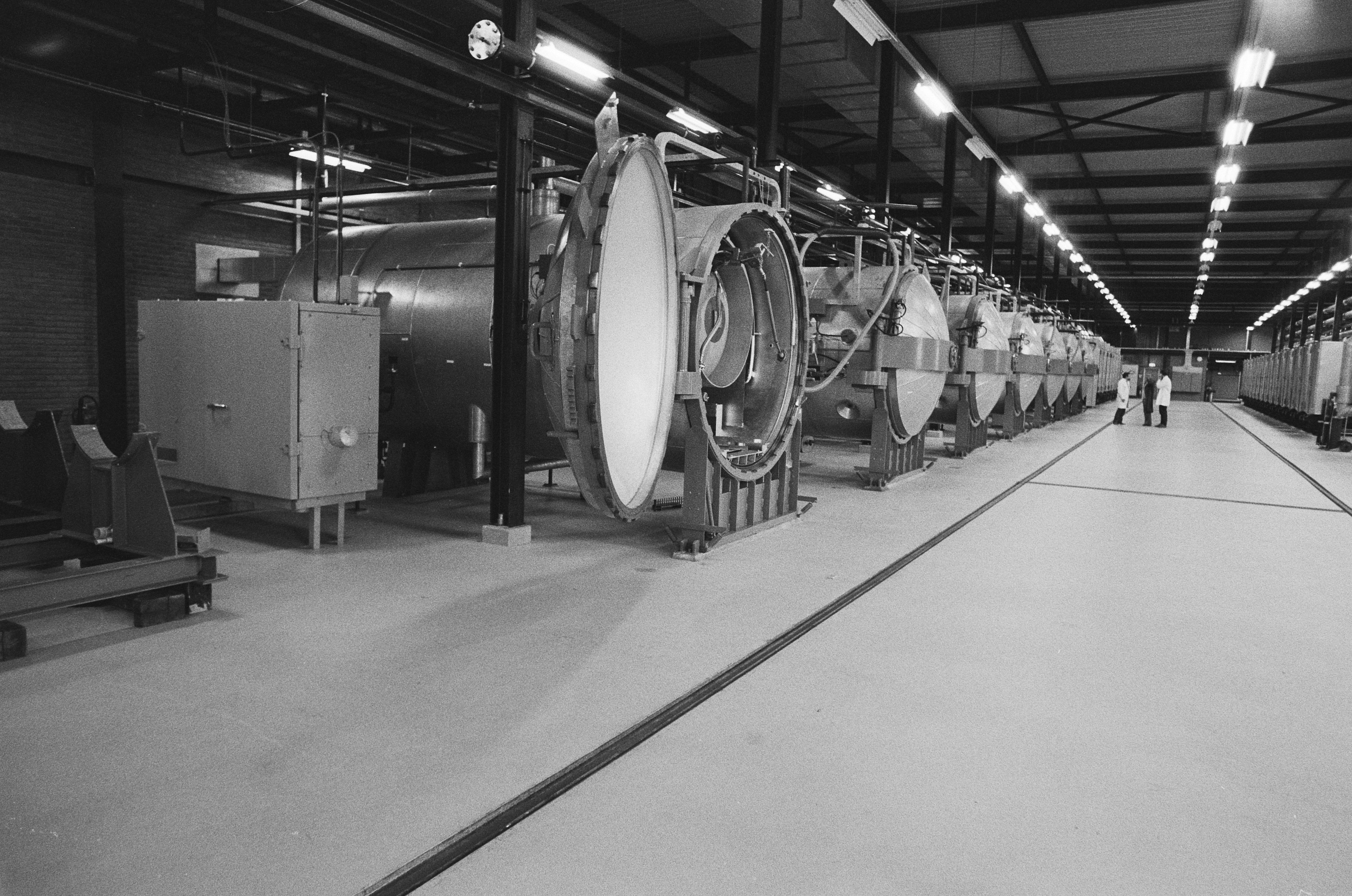
Uranium hexafluoride (UF6) tanks at Urenco in the Netherlands (1984)

The Urenco Group oversees its nuclear operations and management oversight in the Netherlands, United Kingdom, and Germany through the Urenco Nederland, Urenco UK, and Urenco Deutschland, which are 100% subsidiaries of Urenco Enrichment Company Limited. Gas centrifuge plants at Almelo in the Netherlands, Capenhurst in England, and Gronau in Germany, are operated and overseen by the Uranium Enrichment Company Limited of Urenco Group since 1975 in UK and Netherlands and since 1985 in Germany.

The Urenco Group moved its commercial interest in the United States by first opening its marketing and sales office in Arlington, Washington in 1985. The Treaty of Washington signed between the United States and three European goverments allowed the Urenco Group to export and deploy its classified centrifuge technology in the United States through its subsidiary, Urenco USA, in 1992.

The Urenco Group applied for a U.S. Nuclear Regulatory Commission (NRC) official license to operate under the Louisiana Energy Services (LES) where the plant was orginally planned to be in Louisiana, United States. However, due to support available in New Mexico, the United States Department of Energy (DOE) and Urenco USA built the National Enrichment Facility (NEF), which the Urenco USA operates since 2010, and is the only centrifuge-based uranium enrichment facility in the United States.

In 2005, the Treaty of Cardiff between France and the three European government allowed the Urenco Group to co-established Enrichment Technology Company (ETC) in Tricastin jointly with the French company, Areva, of which the shares are equally owned by Urenco Group and Areva. The ETC provides enrichment plant, design service, and classified gas centrifuge technology for French nuclear power plants through its subsidiaries in the Netherlands (Almelo), UK (Capenhurst), Germany (Gronau), and the U.S. (Eunice).

== Expansion ==
As of 2026, Urenco is planning to expand capacity at its sites substantially, in response to increased global interest in constructing new nuclear, life extensions for existing nuclear reactors and US and European nuclear utilities diversifying away from dependence on Russian nuclear fuel following Russia's 2022 invasion of Ukraine.

Urenco plans to add 1.5 million SWU per year capacity to its Almelo facility by 2030 and 2.8 million SWU per year capacity to its US facility by 2036. Urenco has historically produce low-enriched uranium (LEU) enriched up to 5% U-235. In 2025 it began producing LEU+, enriched up to 10% U-235.

Urenco plans to construct a high-assay low-enriched uranium (HALEU) enrichment facility at its Capenhurst, UK site called the Urenco UK Advanced Fuels Facility. This facility will produce uranium enriched up to 20% U-235, which some Generation IV reactors need for fuel. In 2025 Urenco signed the first commercial contract to supply HALEU to Generation IV reactors. Urenco plans to begin construction on its HALEU facility in 2028, and the facility will have initial capacity to produce up to 27 tons of HALEU per year, with the option to double capacity dependent on demand. The UK government provided £196 million in funding for the Advanced Fuels Facility.

In 2025, infrastructure company Costain Group was contracted to upgrade and deliver new infrastructure at the Capenhurst plant. The company is conducting a front-end engineering and design study for the Advanced Fuels Facility that it expects to complete in 2027. The Advanced Fuels Facility will be Europe's first HALEU enrichment facility.

== Decommissioning ==
Urenco Netherlands BV has dismantled enrichment plant SP3, after the decommissioning of SP1 and SP2 in the 1980s and 1990s. Information about decommissioning cost calculations for Urenco facilities is not accessible.

== Controversies ==
=== Abdul Qadeer Khan ===
There is controversy exists between Urecno Group's classified centrifuge technology inadvert appropriation to the Physics Dynamics Research Laboratory (Dutch: FDO) of Vernidge Machine Fabrieken (VMF), a subcontactor to the UCN NV in 1972. The FDO was a part of the larger efforts on Dutch side to learn to scale the Zippe-type centrifuges to supercriticality in 1972. However, Zippe-type gas centrifuge, in its supercritical state, is extremely difficult to build perfectly, nearly impossible, without addressing the specific tribological, mechanical, electrical, and computer challenges.

In April 1973, the Dutch efforts were largely abandoned in favor of subcrtical Zippe-type, which Germany was favoring, leaving behind to flawed engineering designs, incomplete calculations, material science considerations, and fatigue analysis in the company's archives. During this time, the FDO employed Abdul Qadeer Khan, a Pakistani metallurgist, and his Dutch managers relied on Khan to translate the German reports on the centrifuge technology into Dutch language, which allowed him into have access to the designs. In 1975, the defective and flawed design of centrifuge from Dutch side as well as incomplete technical archives were photocopied passed on by Khan before leaving for his homeland, Pakistan.

In light of an export controlled study by American Oak Ridge National Laboratory (ORNL), the United Kingdom declassified the Dutch contribution on Urenco's technology in 1978. Responding to the reports in European media about the centrifuge designs being taken by Khan, Urenco Group clarified that Khan was restricted to his role as technical translaterand only had access to an unclassified section. Prior to 1975–76, the knowledge and literature on the gas centrifuges was widely accessible in open public.

In 1979, A. Q. Khan did directed the letter to Dutch Foreign minister, Chris van der Klaauw, confirming Urenco's statement to that of his role as technical translater and claiming to have never seen a centrifuge machine during his employment witn FDO. This was further comfirmed by Khan's colleagues at the Khan Research Laboratories (KRL) who consistently maintained on Khan's role as a material scientist rather than a centrifuge engineering expert or a nuclear physicist.

Eventually, Pakistani scientists and engineers eventually addressed all the engineering challenges relating to flawed designs and successfully developed the supercritical version of the Zippe-type centrifuges that would be able to produce HEU. Under the secret understanding with the Dutch government, Pakistani government did allowed the Urenco Group to inspect supercritcal version of the Zippe-type centrifuge, and these designs, although differ from Urenco's subcritical version but offers a supercritical version, which are closely guarded secrets in Pakistan.

The designs of flawed centrifuge were later proliferated by A. Q. Khan for monetary gains to Iran and his associate Friedrich Tinner to Libya in successive years.

=== Namibia ===
In May 1985, the United Nations Council for Namibia (UNCN) initiated legal action against the uranium enrichment consortium Urenco for breaching UNCN Decree No. 1. This decree prohibited the exploitation of Namibia's natural resources while the territory was under the administration of South Africa under apartheid. The litigation arose from Urenco's importation of uranium ore from the Rössing mine in Namibia. Although the case was expected to be heard by the end of 1985, proceedings were delayed when Urenco argued that, despite having enriched Namibian uranium since 1980, it was impossible to determine the precise origin of specific consignments. When the case finally reached the court in July 1986, the Dutch government supported Urenco's position, claiming to have been unaware of where the uranium had originally been mined.

=== Uranium tails contracts with Russia ===
According to Greenpeace, Urenco maintains a contract with Russia for the disposal of radioactive waste. However, industry sources note that these contracts do not involve waste disposal, but rather the sale of depleted uranium tails, which are re-enriched to the equivalent of natural uranium. Under the terms of the agreement, Russia, as the enricher, retains ownership of any radioactive waste generated during the process. In March 2009, public protests occurred regarding the transport of a record-volume shipment of depleted uranium hexafluoride (DUF_{6}) from Germany to the Siberian town of Seversk.
