= Zippe-type centrifuge =

Gas centrifuge designed to enrich uranium-235

The Zippe-type centrifuge is a gas centrifuge designed to enrich the rare fissile isotope uranium-235 (^{235}U) from the mixture of isotopes found in naturally occurring uranium compounds. The isotopic separation is based on the slight difference in mass of the isotopes. The Zippe design was developed in the Soviet Union by a team led by 60 Austrian and German scientists and engineers, during detention after their capture at the end of World War II.

In the West and now generally, the type is known by the name of the man who recreated the technology after his return to the West in 1956, Gernot Zippe, based on his recollection of his contributions in the Soviet program. To the extent that it might be referred to in Soviet/Russian usage by any one person's name, it was known at an earlier stage in development as a Kamenev centrifuge, after Evgeni Kamenev.

== Background ==
Natural uranium consists of three isotopes; the majority (99.274%) is U-238, while approximately 0.72% is U-235, fissile by thermal neutrons, and the remaining 0.0055% is U-234. If natural uranium is enriched to 3% U-235, it can be used as fuel for light water nuclear reactors. If it is enriched to 90% uranium-235, it can be used for nuclear weapons.

Diagram of the principles of a Zippe-type gas centrifuge with U-238 represented in dark blue and U-235 represented in light blue.

== Centrifuge uranium enrichment ==
Enriching uranium is difficult because the isotopes are practically identical in chemistry and very similar in weight: U-235 is only 1.26% lighter than U-238 (note this applies only to uranium metal). Centrifuges need to work with a fluid rather than a solid, and this process used gaseous uranium hexafluoride. The relative mass difference between ^{235}UF_{6} and ^{238}UF_{6} is less than 0.86%. Separation efficiency in a centrifuge depends on absolute mass difference. Separation of uranium isotopes requires a centrifuge that can spin at 1,500 revolutions per second (90,000 rpm). If we assume a rotor diameter of 20 cm (as in some modern centrifuges), this would correspond to a centripetal acceleration of around 900,000 g or 8,900 km·s^{-2} (around 42 times the max speed of a standard, lab benchtop microcentrifuge and between 0.9 and 9 times the max speed of a standard lab ultracentrifuge) or a linear speed of greater than Mach 2 in air (Mach 1 = sound velocity, in air ca. 340 m/s) and much more in UF_{6}. For comparison, automatic washing machines operate at only about 12 to 25 revolutions per second (720–1500 rpm) during the spin cycle, while turbines in automotive turbochargers can run up to around 2500–3333 revolutions per second (150,000–200,000 rpm).

Countercurrent Gas centrifuge for uranium enrichment. At full speed there is practically vacuum near the axis, so that there is no leak at the feed-through and that the UF_{6} feed can easily flow in. The lower scoop, collecting the light fraction, also slows down the speed of the gas and thus reduces the radial pressure gradient. This facilitates exchange with the inner gas layer and stimulates the countercurrent.

A Zippe-type centrifuge has a hollow, cylindrical rotor filled with gaseous uranium hexafluoride (UF_{6}). A rotating magnetic field at the bottom of the rotor, as used in an electric motor, is able to spin it quickly enough that the UF_{6} is thrown towards the outer wall, with the ^{238}UF_{6} enriched in the outermost layer and the ^{235}UF_{6} enriched at the inside of this layer. The centrifugal force creates a pressure gradient: On the axis of the centrifuge there is practically vacuum, so that no mechanical feedthrough or seal is needed for the gas inlet and outlets; near the wall the UF_{6} reaches its saturation pressure, which in turn limits the rotation speed, because condensation must be avoided. In the so-called countercurrent centrifuge, the bottom of the gaseous mix can be heated, producing convection currents. But the countercurrent is usually stimulated mechanically by the scoop collecting the enriched fraction. In such a way, the enrichment in each horizontal layer is repeated (and thus multiplied) in the next layer, similarly as in column distillation. One scoop is behind a perforated baffle that rotates with the centrifuge; it collects the ^{235}UF_{6}-rich fraction. The other scoop is without baffle. It slows down the gas rotation and thus increases the pressure towards the inside, so that also the ^{235}UF_{6}-rich fraction can be collected without pumping. Each centrifuge has one inlet on the axis and two output lines, one collecting the gas at the bottom and one at the top.

Quantitatively, the radial pressure (or density) distribution can be given by$p(r)= p(R)\exp(-(M\omega^2/2kT)(R^2-r^2))$

where p is the pressure, r the variable radius and R its maximum, M the molecular mass, ω the angular velocity, k the Boltzmann constant and T the temperature. (This equation is similar to the barometric formula.) Writing this equation for both isotopes and dividing, gives the (r-dependent) isotope ratio. It only contains ΔM (not the relative mass difference ΔM/M) in the exponent. The radial enrichment factor then results by dividing through the initial isotope ratio. To calculate the total enrichment in a countercurrent centrifuge of height H, one has to add a factor of H/(R√2) in the exponent.

According to Glaser, early centrifuges had rotor diameters of 7.4 to 15 cm and lengths of 0.3 to 3.2 m, and the peripheral speed was 350 to 500 m/s. The modern centrifuge TC-21 of Urenco has a diameter of 20 cm and a length of more than 5 m, spinning with 770 m/s. Centrus (formerly USEC) plans a centrifuge with 60 cm diameter, 12 m height and 900 m/s peripheral speed.

A countercurrent of the gas is stimulated either mechanically or (less preferred) by a temperature gradient between the top and bottom of the rotor. With a countercurrent-to-feed ratio of 4, Glaser calculates a separation factor of 1,74 for a TC-21 centrifuge of 5 m height. Lowering this ratio (by increasing the feed) decreases the separation factor but increases the throughput and thus the productivity.

To reduce friction, the rotor spins in a vacuum. Part of the rotor with the near-by housing acts as a molecular pump, which maintains the vacuum. A magnetic bearing holds the top of the rotor steady, and the only physical contact (necessary only during start-up) is the conical jewel bearing on which the rotor sits. Both bearings contain measures for damping vibrations. The three gas lines enter the rotor on its axis.

After the scientists were released from Soviet captivity in 1956, Gernot Zippe was surprised to find that engineers in the West were years behind in their centrifuge technology. He was able to reproduce his design at the University of Virginia in the United States, publishing the results, even though the Soviets had confiscated his notes. Zippe left the United States when he was effectively barred from continuing his research: The Americans classified the work as secret, requiring him either to become a U.S. citizen (he refused), return to Europe, or abandon his research. He returned to Europe where, during the 1960s, he and his colleagues made the centrifuge more efficient by changing the material of the rotor from aluminium to maraging steel, an alloy with a longer fatigue life and longer breaking length, which allowed higher speed. This improved centrifuge design was long used by the commercial company Urenco to produce enriched uranium fuel for nuclear power stations. More recently, they use (e.g. in their model TC-21) carbon fiber reinforced walls.

The exact details of advanced Zippe-type centrifuges are closely guarded secrets. For example, the efficiency of the centrifuges is improved by increasing their speed of rotation. To do so, stronger materials, such as carbon fiber-reinforced composite materials, are used; but details of the material and its protection against chemical attacks are kept secret. Such are also the various techniques that are used to avoid forces causing destructive (bending) vibrations: Lengthening of a (countercurrent) centrifuge improves the enrichment exponentially. But it also decreases the vibrational frequency of mechanical resonances, which increases the danger of catastrophic failure during start-up (as happened during the Stuxnet event in Iran). Interrupting the cylindrical rotor by flexible bellows controls the low-frequency vibrations, and careful speed control during start-up helps to ensure that the centrifuge does not operate too long at speeds where resonance is a problem. But more secret measures are necessary. Therefore, Russia stayed with "subcritical" centrifuges (i.e., with small lengths around 0.5–1 m), whereas those of Urenco have lengths up to 10 m.

The Zippe-type centrifuge is extremely difficult to build successfully and requires carefully precised machined parts. However, compared to other enrichment methods, it is much cheaper and is faster to set up, consumes much less energy and requires little area for the plant. Therefore, it can be built in relative secrecy. This makes it ideal for covert nuclear-weapons programs and increases the risk of nuclear proliferation. Centrifuge cascades also have much less material held in the machine at any time than gaseous diffusion plants.

== Global usage ==
Pakistan's atomic bomb program developed the P1 and P2 centrifuges based on early designs of Urenco; the first two centrifuges that Pakistan deployed in large numbers but reduced drastically after a revised critical mass calculations. The P1 centrifuge uses an aluminum rotor, and the P2 centrifuge uses a maraging steel rotor, which is stronger, spins faster, and enriches more uranium per machine than the P1. In Pakistan, the Zippe-type centrifuge had a local designation and was known as Centrifuge Khan (after Abdul Qadeer Khan).

Russian sources dispute the account of Soviet centrifuge development given by Gernot Zippe. They cite Max Steenbeck as the German scientist in charge of the German part of the Soviet centrifuge effort, which was started by German refugee Fritz Lange in the 1930s. The Soviets credit Steenbeck, Isaac Kikoin and Evgeni Kamenev with originating different valuable aspects of the design. They state Zippe was engaged in building prototypes for the project for two years from 1953. Since the centrifuge project was top secret the Soviets did not challenge any of Zippe's claims at the time.

=== Zippe-type centrifuge facilities ===
- Khan Research Laboratories in Pakistan
- National Enrichment Facility of Los Alamos National Laboratory in the United States
- Urenco Group in Great Britain, the Netherlands, and Germany
- Russia (where it is called Kamenev centrifuge)

== See also ==
- Gas centrifuge
- Ultracentrifuge
- Magnetic levitation
- Thrust bearing
- German nuclear weapon project
- Germany and weapons of mass destruction
- Pakistan and weapons of mass destruction
- Netherlands and weapons of mass destruction
- Forced labor of Germans in the Soviet Union
- Russian Alsos
- Stuxnet
