= Tom Tuohy =

British power plant manager (1917–2008)

Thomas Tuohy CBE (7 November 1917 – 12 March 2008) was deputy to the general manager at the Windscale nuclear facility when a major fire erupted on 10 October 1957. He was the leading participant in efforts to put out the fire which was emitting radioactive contamination into the air, and so played a key role in minimising Britain's worst nuclear disaster.

== Early life and career ==
Tuohy was born in Wallsend and educated at St Cuthbert's Grammar School in Newcastle upon Tyne, and the University of Reading.

During World War II he worked for the Royal Ordnance as a chemist, and in 1946 joined the nuclear industry, becoming deputy general manager of Windscale in 1957.

== Windscale fire ==
On 10 October 1957 Tuohy was at home, looking after his family, who had flu. He received a telephone call from his boss saying, "Come at once. Pile number one is on fire." On his arrival at Windscale, he removed his radiation recording badge, making it impossible for anyone to know if he had exceeded permitted radiation dose levels, and made repeated inspections directly into the 80 ft pile. Over the next few hours he was instrumental in directing the efforts which eventually brought the blaze under control.

Despite his excessive exposure to radiation that day, Tuohy lived to the age of 90. He was appointed CBE in the 1969 New Years honours list.

In 1990, the first of three BBC documentaries on the incident was shown. Titled Our Reactor Is on Fire, the documentary featured interviews with key plant workers, including Tom Tuohy. In 2007 the BBC aired another documentary about the accident titled "Windscale: Britain’s Biggest Nuclear Disaster", which investigates the history of the first British nuclear facility and its role in the development of nuclear weapons. The documentary features interviews with key scientists and plant operators, including Tuohy. The documentary suggests that the fire – the first fire in any nuclear facility – was caused by the relaxation of safety measures, as a result of pressure from the British government to quickly produce fissile materials for nuclear weapons.

== See also ==
- Windscale fire
