= Gen 75 Committee =

Body formed to establish Britain's nuclear policy

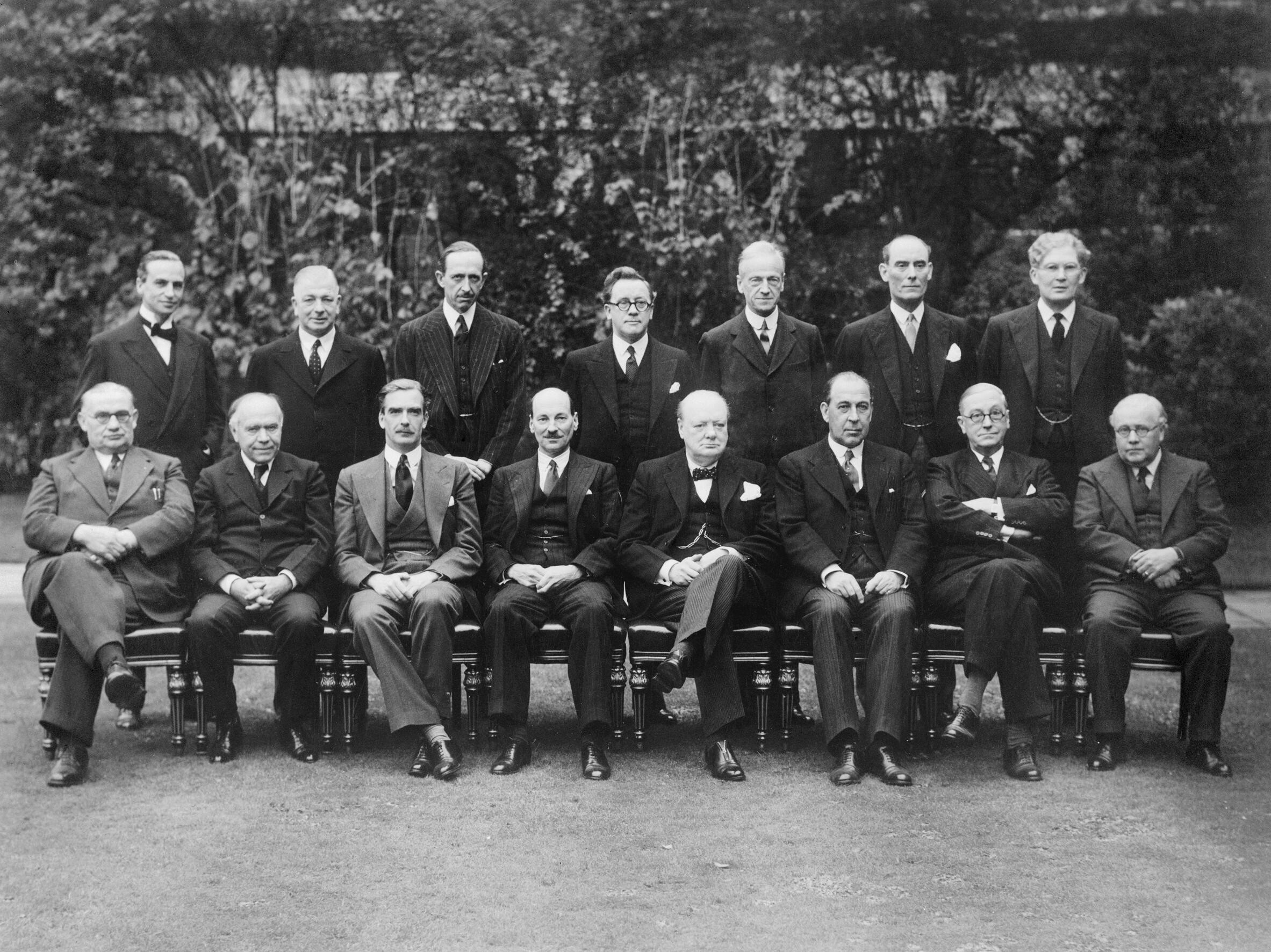
This 1940 photograph includes several members of the Gen 75 Committee. Standing, from left to right, Sir Archibald Sinclair, Mr A. V. Alexander, Lord Cranborne, Herbert Morrison, Lord Moyne, David Margesson and Brendan Bracken. Seated, from left to right, Ernest Bevin, Lord Beaverbrook, Anthony Eden, Clement Attlee, Winston Churchill, Sir John Anderson, Arthur Greenwood and Sir Kingsley Wood.

The Gen 75 Committee was a committee of the British cabinet, convened by the Prime Minister, Clement Attlee, on 10 August 1945. It was one of many ad hoc cabinet committees, each of which was convened to handle a single issue, and given a prefix of Gen (for general) and a number. The purpose of the Gen 75 committee was to discuss and establish the British government's nuclear policy. Attlee dubbed it the "Atom Bomb Committee". It was replaced by an official ministerial committee, the Atomic Energy Committee, in February 1947.

Matters considered by the Gen 75 Committee included decisions on what production facilities should be built to produce nuclear weapons, authorising the construction of nuclear reactors to produce plutonium at Windscale, and a gaseous diffusion plant to produce uranium-235 at Capenhurst. It took decisions on the administrative structures that would oversee production, and appointed Marshal of the Royal Air Force Lord Portal, the wartime Chief of the Air Staff, to run the project, which became High Explosive Research. The final decision to proceed with building nuclear weapons, however, was made by another Gen committee, the Gen 163 Committee.

== Background ==
During the early part of the Second World War, Britain had a nuclear weapons project, codenamed Tube Alloys. A directorate of that name coordinated this effort. Sir John Anderson, the Lord President of the Council, was the minister responsible, and Wallace Akers from Imperial Chemical Industries (ICI) was appointed the director. At the Quadrant Conference in August 1943, the Prime Minister, Winston Churchill and the President of the United States, Franklin Roosevelt, signed the Quebec Agreement, which merged Tube Alloys with the American Manhattan Project to create a combined British, American and Canadian project. The British considered the Quebec Agreement to be the best deal they could have struck under the circumstances, and the restrictions were the price they had to pay to obtain the technical information needed for a successful post-war nuclear weapons project. Margaret Gowing noted that the "idea of the independent deterrent was already well entrenched."

Many of Britain's top scientists participated in the British contribution to the Manhattan Project. A British mission led by Akers assisted in the development of gaseous diffusion technology at the SAM Laboratories in New York. Another, led by Mark Oliphant, who acted as deputy director at the Berkeley Radiation Laboratory, assisted with the electromagnetic separation process. John Cockcroft became the director of the Anglo-Canadian Montreal Laboratory. The British mission to the Los Alamos Laboratory led by James Chadwick, and later Rudolf Peierls, included distinguished scientists such as Geoffrey Taylor, James Tuck, Niels Bohr, William Penney, Otto Frisch, Ernest Titterton and Klaus Fuchs, who was later revealed to be a spy for the Soviet Union. As overall head of the British Mission, Chadwick forged a close and successful partnership with Brigadier General Leslie R. Groves, the director of the Manhattan Project, and ensured that British participation was complete and wholehearted.

== Origin ==
The Government of the United Kingdom is directed by the cabinet, a group of senior government ministers led by the Prime Minister. Most of the day-to-day work of the cabinet is carried out by cabinet committees, rather than by the full cabinet. Each committee has its own area of responsibility, and their decisions are binding on the entire cabinet. Their membership and scope is determined by the Prime Minister.

During the post-Second World War period, in addition to standing committees, there were ad hoc committees that were convened to handle a single issue. These were normally short-lived. Each was given a prefix of Gen and a number. Gen 183, for example, was the Committee on Subversive Activities. Between 1945 and 1964, Gen (for general) committees were sequentially numbered from 1 to 881 in order of formation.

Prime Minister Clement Attlee, who succeeded Churchill in June 1945, created the Gen 75 Committee on 10 August 1945 to examine the feasibility of a nuclear weapons programme. It was known informally by Attlee as the "Atomic Bomb Committee", although no explicit decision to build one was made until January 1947. The Gen 75 Committee differed from other Gen committees in that its deliberations were not reported to the full cabinet, and were shrouded in secrecy even at that level. The entire subject of nuclear weapons was kept off the full cabinet agenda, and cabinet ministers not attending the meetings may not have even known of its existence.

== Composition ==
Membership of Gen 75 initially consisted of five ministers: the Prime Minister, Clement Attlee; the Lord President of the Council, Herbert Morrison; the Foreign Secretary, Ernest Bevin; and the President of the Board of Trade, Stafford Cripps. It was soon expanded with the addition of the Lord Privy Seal, Arthur Greenwood, and the Chancellor of the Exchequer, Hugh Dalton. After the Gen 75 Committee decided that the nuclear weapons project should be the responsibility of the Ministry of Supply, the Minister of Supply, John Wilmot, was added.

== Activity ==
=== International relations ===
As reports came in of the devastation caused by the atomic bombing of Hiroshima and Nagasaki, Attlee considered how nuclear weapons had changed the nature of warfare and international relations. He raised the matter with the Gen 75 Committee, and Bevin suggested that a first step should be a letter to Truman suggesting a review of policy. The letter was sent to Truman on 20 September 1945. A response was slow in coming; Truman was concerned about the effect that Anglo-American and Canadian talks might have on the Soviet Union. At Attlee's insistence, talks were scheduled for 9 November 1945.

The Gen 75 Committee meeting discussed what should be said at the meeting, in particular what British policy towards the Soviet Union should be. Bevin took a conciliatory line at the Gen 75 Committee meeting on 11 October 1945, only to take a harder one at the meeting a week later. Unusually, the matter was placed before the full cabinet. Hopes were expressed that Britain might be able to broker a deal that would head off a schism between the United States and the Soviet Union. Ultimately, though, it endorsed Attlee's preference that practical knowledge of nuclear weapons design not be shared with the Soviet Union.

=== Research establishment ===
During the war, Chadwick, Cockcroft, Oliphant, Peierls, Harrie Massey and Herbert Skinner had met in Washington, DC, in November 1944, and drawn up a proposal for a British atomic energy research establishment, which they had calculated would cost around £1.5 million. The Tube Alloys Committee endorsed their recommendation in April 1945, and Anderson, in his capacity as chairman of the Advisory Committee on Atomic Energy, submitted the memorandum advocating it to the Gen 75 Committee. It endorsed the creation of the Atomic Energy Research Establishment in September, Attlee announced the decision in the House of Commons on 29 October 1945.

=== Organisation of production ===
In October 1945, the Gen 75 Committee considered the issue of ministerial responsibility for atomic energy. The Cabinet Secretary, Sir Edward Bridges, and the Advisory Committee on Atomic Energy both recommended that it be placed within the Ministry of Supply. Developing atomic energy would require an enormous construction effort, which the Ministry of Supply was best equipped to undertake. The Tube Alloys Directorate was transferred from the Department of Scientific and Industrial Research to the Ministry of Supply effective 1 November 1945.

To coordinate the atomic energy effort, the Gen 75 Committee decided to appoint a Controller of Production, Atomic Energy (CPAE). Wilmot suggested Marshal of the Royal Air Force Lord Portal, the wartime Chief of the Air Staff. Portal was reluctant to accept the post, as he felt that he lacked administrative experience outside the Royal Air Force, but eventually accepted it for a two-year term, commencing in March 1946. In this role he had direct access to the Prime Minister. Portal ran the project until 1951, when he was succeeded by Sir Frederick Morgan. It was hidden under the cover name High Explosive Research.

=== Nuclear reactors ===
An early debate among the scientists was whether the fissile material for an atomic bomb should be uranium-235 or plutonium. Tube Alloys had performed much of the pioneering research on gaseous diffusion for uranium enrichment, and Oliphant's team in Berkeley were well-acquainted with the electromagnetic process. The staff that had remained in Britain strongly favoured uranium-235; but the scientists that had worked in the United States argued for plutonium on the basis of its greater efficiency as an explosive, despite the fact that they had neither the expertise in the design of nuclear reactors to produce it, nor the requisite knowledge of plutonium chemistry or metallurgy to extract it. However, the Montreal Laboratory had designed and was building pilot reactors, and had carried out some work on separating plutonium from uranium.

The Manhattan Project had pursued both avenues, and the scientists who had worked at Los Alamos were aware of work there with composite cores that used both; but there were concerns that Britain might not have the money, resources or skilled manpower for this. In the end, it came down to economics; a reactor could be built more cheaply than a separation plant that produced an equivalent quantity of enriched uranium, and made more efficient use of uranium fuel. A reactor and separation plant capable of producing enough plutonium for fifteen bombs per year was costed at around £20 million.

It fell to the Gen 75 Committee to decide how many reactors should be built at its meeting on 18 December 1945. Considering the demands that reactors would make on scarce skilled labour and materials, the Gen 75 Committee decided to defer a decision on building a second reactor, but to proceed with the first one "with the highest urgency and importance". Reactors were built at the former ROF Sellafield. To avoid any confusion with Springfields, where uranium metal was produced, the name was changed to Windscale.

=== Gaseous diffusion facility ===
A few months later, Portal, who had not been appointed when this decision was taken, began to have doubts. Word reached him of problems with the Hanford Site reactors, which had been all but completely shut down due to Wigner's disease. On a visit to the United States in May 1946, Groves advised Portal not to build a reactor. By this time, there was interest from the scientists in making better use of uranium fuel by re-enrichment of spent fuel rods. A gaseous diffusion plant was costed at somewhere between £30 and £40 million. The Gen 75 Committee considered the proposal in October 1946. Michael Perrin, who was present, later recalled that:

The meeting was about to decide against it on grounds of cost, when Bevin arrived late and said "We've got to have this thing. I don't mind it for myself, but I don't want any other Foreign Secretary of this country to be talked at or to by the Secretary of State of the United States as I have just been in my discussion with Mr Byrnes. We've got to have this thing over here, whatever it costs... We've got to have the bloody Union Jack flying on top of it."

The Gen 75 Committee thereupon approved the construction of the proposed gaseous diffusion plant, which was built on the site of an old Royal Ordnance Factory at Capenhurst, near Chester.

== Gen 163 Committee ==
In July 1946, the Chiefs of Staff Committee considered the issue of nuclear weapons, and recommended that Britain acquire them. This recommendation was accepted by the Cabinet Defence Committee on 22 July 1946. The Chief of the Air Staff, Lord Tedder, officially requested an atomic bomb on 9 August 1946. The Chiefs of Staff estimated that 200 bombs would be required by 1957. Despite this, and the research and construction of facilities that had already been approved, there was still no official decision to proceed with making atomic bombs.

Dissent came from Patrick Blackett, who submitted a paper to the Gen 75 Committee that forcefully argued against Britain acquiring atomic bombs. The Foreign Office, however, labelled his ideas "dangerous and misleading rubbish", and rejected a characterisation of the Soviet Union as a peace-loving state with no expansionist ambitions whereas the United States was an aggressor predisposed towards preemptive war.

Portal submitted his proposal to proceed with the manufacture of nuclear weapons at the 8 January 1947 meeting of the Gen 163 Committee. This was a smaller committee, consisting of Attlee, Morrison, Bevin, Wilmot, the Secretary of State for Dominion Affairs, Lord Addison, and the Minister of Defence, A. V. Alexander. It was this committee, which met only once, that agreed to proceed with the development of atomic bombs. Once again, Bevin was a strong supporter, arguing that "We could not afford to acquiesce in an American monopoly of this new development." It also endorsed Portal's proposal to place Penney in charge of the bomb development effort, although Penney was not informed of this decision until May.

== Abolishment ==
With the decision taken to proceed with nuclear weapons development, the Gen 75 Committee was replaced in February 1947 by a standing committee, the Atomic Energy Committee "to deal with questions of policy in the field of atomic energy which require the consideration of Ministers". Its membership was that of the Gen 75 Committee, plus Alexander and Addison. However, the Atomic Energy Committee only met five times in 1947, twice in 1948, four times in 1949, twice in 1950 and just once in 1951. Important decisions therefore continued to be made by Gen committees.
