= Separative work units =

Amount of separation done by a uranium enrichment process

Separative work – the amount of separation done by a Uranium enrichment process – is a function of the concentrations of the feedstock, the enriched output, and the depleted tailings; and is expressed in units which are so calculated as to be proportional to the total input (energy / machine operation time) and to the mass processed.

The same amount of separative work will require different amounts of energy depending on the efficiency of the separation technology. Separative work is measured in Separative work units SWU, kg SW, or kg UTA (from the German Urantrennarbeit – literally uranium separation work)

- 1 SWU = 1 kg SW = 1 kg UTA
- 1 kSWU = 1 tSW = 1 t UTA
- 1 MSWU = 1 ktSW = 1 kt UTA

Separative work unit is not a unit of energy, but serves as a measure of the enrichment services. As of August 2025, spot prices per SWU were $188, though most SWU are bought in long-term contracts which averaged $97/SWU in 2024. The unit was introduced by Paul Dirac in 1941.

== Definition ==
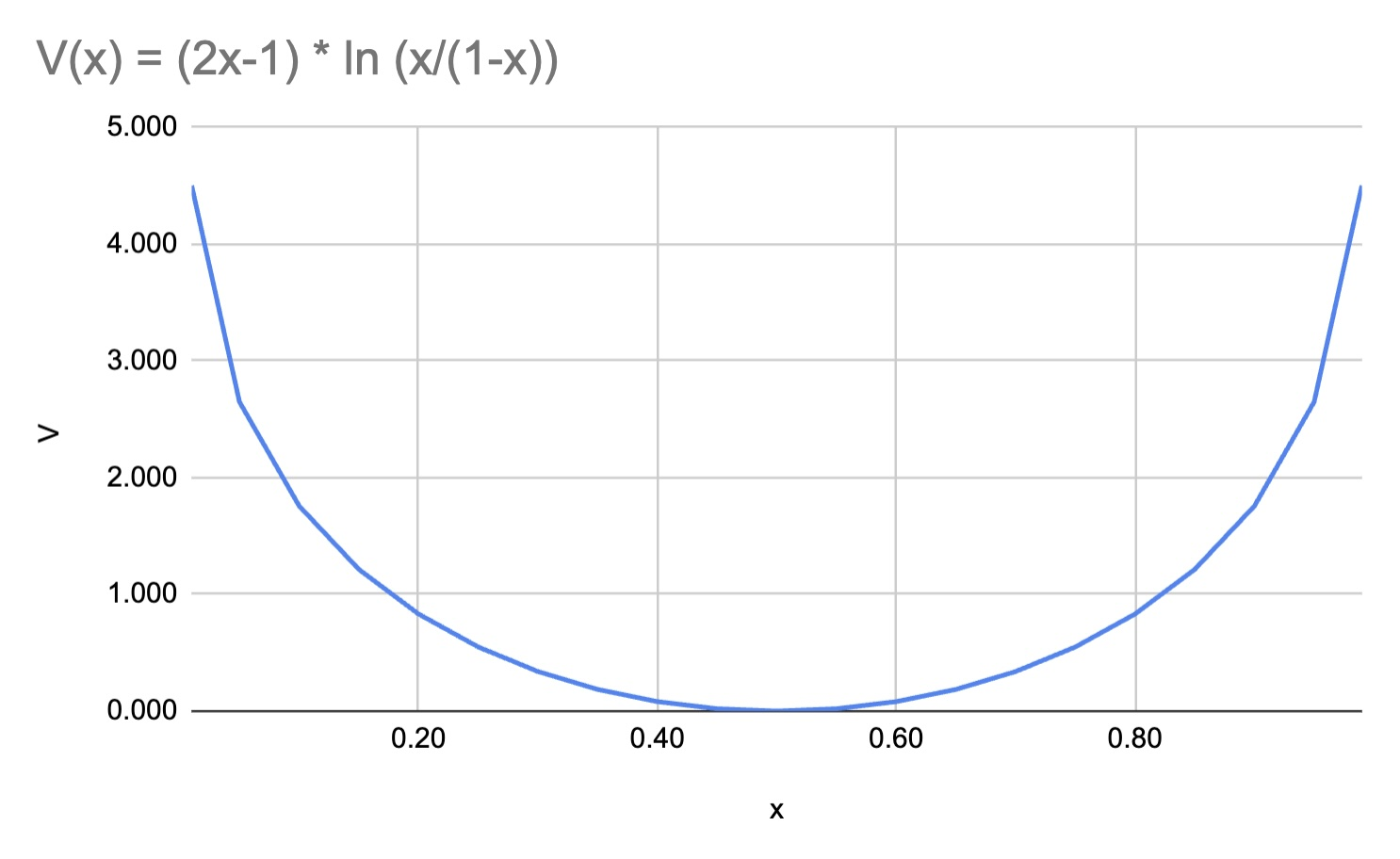
Logarithmic function used in calculating Separative Work Units

The work $W_\mathrm{SWU}$ necessary to separate a mass $F$ of feed of assay $x_{f}$ into a mass $P$ of product assay $x_{p}$, and tails of mass $T$ and assay $x_{t}$ is given by the expression:

$$W_\mathrm{SWU} = P \cdot V\left(x_{p}\right)+T \cdot V(x_{t})-F \cdot V(x_{f})$$

where $V\left(x\right)$ is the value function, defined as:

$$V(x) = (2x - 1)  \ln \left(\frac{x}{1 - x}\right)$$

Given the desired amount of product $P$, the necessary feed $F$ and resulting tails $T$ are:

$$F = \frac{x_{p} - x_{t}}{x_{f} - x_{t}} \cdot P$$
$$T = \frac{x_{p} - x_{f}}{x_{f} - x_{t}} \cdot P$$

== Relation to energy required ==
The number of separative work units provided by an enrichment facility is directly related to the amount of energy that the facility consumes. Modern gaseous diffusion plants typically require 2,400 to 2,500 kilowatt-hours (kW·h), or 8.6–9 gigajoules, (GJ) of electricity per SWU while gas centrifuge plants require just 50 to 60 kW·h (180–220 MJ) of electricity per SWU.

== Examples ==
=== Simple NU to LEU example ===
For example, beginning with 102 kilograms (225 lb) of natural uranium (NU) at 0.71% ^{235}U, and enriching to 4.5%, with tails at 0.3%, you will wind up with 10kg of enriched uranium and 92kg of tails.

The value function for the 4.5% product is

(2*0.045 - 1) ln (0.045/(1-0.045))
= (-0.91) ln(0.04712)
= (-0.91) (-3.055)
= 2.78

Similarly, the value for the 0.71% feed material is 4.87, and the value for the 0.3% tails is 5.77.

Therefore, the combined SWU value is:

10 * V(4.5%) + 92 * V(0.3%) - 102 * V(0.71%)
= 10*2.78 + 92*5.77 - 102*4.87
= 27.8 + 531.0 - 496.7
= 62.1 SWU

This operation therefore takes about 62 SWU to complete.

=== Fuel generation: example for power stations ===
A large nuclear power station with a net electrical capacity of 1300 MW requires about 25 tonnes per year (25 t/a) of LEU with a ^{235}U concentration of 3.75%. This quantity is produced from about 210 t of NU using about 120 kSWU. An enrichment plant with a capacity of 1000 kSWU/a is, therefore, able to enrich the uranium needed to fuel about eight large nuclear power stations.

== See also ==
- Enriched Uranium
