= Extractive metallurgy =

Ore extraction material science

Extractive metallurgy is a branch of metallurgical engineering studying the process and methods of extraction of metals from their natural mineral deposits. The field is a materials science, covering all aspects of the types of ore, washing, concentration, separation, chemical processes and extraction of pure metal and their alloying to suit various applications, sometimes for direct use as a finished product, but more often in a form that requires further working to achieve the given properties to suit the applications.

The field of ferrous and non-ferrous extractive metallurgy have specialties that are generically grouped into the categories of mineral processing, hydrometallurgy, pyrometallurgy, and electrometallurgy based on the process adopted to extract the metal. Several processes are used for extraction of the same metal depending on occurrence and chemical requirements. Extractive metallurgy in the context of the field of space resource extraction is referred to as astrometallurgy.

== Mineral processing ==
Mineral processing begins with beneficiation, consisting of initially breaking down the ore to required sizes depending on the concentration process to be followed, by crushing, grinding, sieving etc. Thereafter, the ore is physically separated from any unwanted impurity, depending on the form of occurrence and or further process involved. Separation processes take advantage of physical properties of the materials. These physical properties can include density, particle size and shape, electrical and magnetic properties, and surface properties. Major physical and chemical methods include gravitational or magnetic separation, froth flotation etc., whereby the impurities and unwanted materials are removed from the ore and the base ore of the metal is concentrated, meaning the percentage of metal in the ore is increased. This concentrate is then either processed to remove moisture or else used as is for extraction of the metal or made into shapes and forms that can undergo further processing, with ease of handling.

Ore bodies often contain more than one valuable metal. Tailings of a previous process may be used as a feed in another process to extract a secondary product from the original ore. Additionally, a concentrate may contain more than one valuable metal. That concentrate would then be processed to separate the valuable metals into individual constituents.

== Hydrometallurgy ==
Hydrometallurgy is concerned with processes involving aqueous solutions to extract metals from ores. The first step in the hydrometallurgical process is leaching, which involves dissolution of the valuable metals into the aqueous solution and or a suitable solvent. After the solution is separated from the ore solids, the extract is often subjected to various processes of purification and concentration before the valuable metal is recovered either in its metallic state or as a chemical compound. This may include precipitation, distillation, adsorption, and solvent extraction. The final recovery step may involve precipitation, cementation, or an electrometallurgical process. Sometimes, hydrometallurgical processes may be carried out directly on the ore material without any pretreatment steps. More often, the ore must be pretreated by various mineral processing steps, and sometimes by pyrometallurgical processes.

== Pyrometallurgy ==
Ellingham diagram for high temperature oxidation

Pyrometallurgy involves high temperature processes where chemical reactions take place among gases, solids, and molten materials. Solids containing valuable metals are treated to form intermediate compounds for further processing or converted into their elemental or metallic state. Pyrometallurgical processes that involve gases and solids are typified by calcining and roasting operations. Processes that produce molten products are collectively referred to as smelting operations. The energy required to sustain the high temperature pyrometallurgical processes may derive from the exothermic nature of the chemical reactions taking place. Typically, these reactions are oxidation, e.g. of sulfide to sulfur dioxide . Often, however, energy must be added to the process by combustion of fuel or, in the case of some smelting processes, by the direct application of electrical energy.

Ellingham diagrams are a useful way of analysing the possible reactions, and so predicting their outcome.

== Electrometallurgy ==
Electrometallurgy involves metallurgical processes that take place in some form of electrolytic cell. The most common types of electrometallurgical processes are electrowinning and electro-refining. Electrowinning is an electrolysis process used to recover metals in aqueous solution, usually as the result of an ore having undergone one or more hydrometallurgical processes. The metal of interest is plated onto the cathode, while the anode is an inert electrical conductor. Electro-refining is used to dissolve an impure metallic anode (typically from a smelting process) and produce a high purity cathode. Fused salt electrolysis is another electrometallurgical process whereby the valuable metal has been dissolved into a molten salt which acts as the electrolyte, and the valuable metal collects on the cathode of the cell. The fused salt electrolysis process is conducted at temperatures sufficient to keep both the electrolyte and the metal being produced in the molten state. The scope of electrometallurgy has significant overlap with the areas of hydrometallurgy and (in the case of fused salt electrolysis) pyrometallurgy. Additionally, electrochemical phenomena play a considerable role in many mineral processing and hydrometallurgical processes.

== Ionometallurgy ==
Mineral processing and extraction of metals are very energy-intensive processes, which are not exempted of producing large volumes of solid residues and wastewater, which also require energy to be further treated and disposed. Moreover, as the demand for metals increases, the metallurgical industry must rely on sources of materials with lower metal contents both from a primary (e.g., mineral ores) and/or secondary (e.g., slags, tailings, municipal waste) raw materials. Consequently, mining activities and waste recycling must evolve towards the development of more selective, efficient and environmentally friendly mineral and metal processing routes.

Mineral processing operations are needed firstly to concentrate the mineral phases of interest and reject the unwanted material physical or chemically associated to a defined raw material. The process, however, demand about 30 GJ/tonne of metal, which accounts about 29% of the total energy spent on mining in the USA. Meanwhile, pyrometallurgy is a significant producer of greenhouse gas emissions and harmful flue dust. Hydrometallurgy entails the consumption of large volumes of lixiviants such as H_{2}SO_{4}, HCl, KCN, NaCN which have poor selectivity. Moreover, despite the environmental concern and the use restriction imposed by some countries, cyanidation is still considered the prime process technology to recover gold from ores. Mercury is also used by artisanal miners in less economically developed countries to concentrate gold and silver from minerals, despite its obvious toxicity. Bio-hydro-metallurgy make use of living organisms, such as bacteria and fungi, and although this method demands only the input of O_{2} and CO_{2} from the atmosphere, it requires low solid-to-liquid ratios and long contact times, which significantly reduces space-time yields.

Ionometallurgy makes use of non-aqueous ionic solvents such ionic liquids (ILs) and deep eutectic solvents (DESs), which allows the development of closed-loop flow sheet to effectively recover metals by, for instance, integrating the metallurgical unit operations of leaching and electrowinning. It allows to process metals at moderate temperatures in a non-aqueous environment which allows controlling metal speciation, tolerates impurities and at the same time exhibits suitable solubilities and current efficiencies. This simplify conventional processing routes and allows a substantial reduction in the size of a metal processing plant.

=== Metal extraction with ionic fluids ===
DESs are fluids generally composed of two or three cheap and safe components that are capable of self-association, often through hydrogen bond interactions, to form eutectic mixtures with a melting point lower than that of each individual component. DESs are generally liquid at temperatures lower than 100 °C, and they exhibit similar physico-chemical properties to traditional ILs, while being much cheaper and environmentally friendlier. Most of them are mixtures of choline chloride (ChCl) and a hydrogen-bond donor (e.g., urea, ethylene glycol, malonic acid) or mixtures of choline chloride with a hydrated metal salt. Other choline salts (e.g. acetate, citrate, nitrate) have a much higher costs or need to be synthesised, and the DES formulated from these anions are typically much more viscous and can have higher conductivities than for choline chloride. This results in lower plating rates and poorer throwing power and for this reason chloride-based DES systems are still favoured. For instance, Reline (a 1:2 mixture of choline chloride and urea) has been used to selectively recover Zn and Pb from a mixed metal oxide matrix. Similarly, Ethaline (a 1: 2 mixture of choline chloride and ethylene glycol) facilitates metal dissolution in electropolishing of steels. DESs have also demonstrated promising results to recover metals from complex mixtures such Cu/Zn and Ga/As, and precious metals from minerals. It has also been demonstrated that metals can be recovered from complex mixtures by electrocatalysis using a combination of DESs as lixiviants and an oxidising agent, while metal ions can be simultaneously separated from the solution by electrowinning.

==== Recovery of precious metals by ionometallurgy ====
Precious metals are rare, naturally occurring metallic chemical elements of high economic value. Chemically, the precious metals tend to be less reactive than most elements. They include gold and silver, but also the so-called platinum group metals: ruthenium, rhodium, palladium, osmium, iridium, and platinum (see precious metals). Extraction of these metals from their corresponding hosting minerals would typically require pyrometallurgy (e.g., roasting), hydrometallurgy (cyanidation), or both as processing routes. Early studies have demonstrated that gold dissolution rate in Ethaline compares very favourably to the cyanidation method, which is further enhanced by the addition of iodine as an oxidising agent. In an industrial process the iodine has the potential to be employed as an electrocatalyst, whereby it is continuously recovered in situ from the reduced iodide by electrochemical oxidation at the anode of an electrochemical cell. Dissolved metals can be selectively deposited at the cathode by adjusting the electrode potential. The method also allows better selectivity as part of the gangue (e.g., pyrite) tend to be dissolved more slowly.

Sperrylite (PtAs_{2}) and moncheite (PtTe_{2}), which are typically the more abundant platinum minerals in many orthomagmatic deposits, do not react under the same conditions in Ethaline because they are disulphide (pyrite), diarsenide (sperrylite) or ditellurides (calaverite and moncheite) minerals, which are particularly resistant to iodine oxidation. The reaction mechanism by which dissolution of platinum minerals is taking place is still under investigation.

==== Metal recovery from sulfide minerals with ionometallurgy ====
Metal sulfides (e.g., pyrite FeS_{2}, arsenopyrite FeAsS, chalcopyrite CuFeS_{2}) are normally processed by chemical oxidation either in aqueous media or at high temperatures. In fact, most base metals, e.g., aluminium, chromium, must be (electro)chemically reduced at high temperatures by which the process entails a high energy demand, and sometimes large volumes of aqueous waste is generated. In aqueous media chalcopyrite, for instance, is more difficult to dissolve chemically than covellite and chalcocite due to surface effects (formation of polysulfide species,). The presence of Cl^{−} ions has been suggested to alter the morphology of any sulfide surface formed, allowing the sulfide mineral to leach more easily by preventing passivation. DESs provide a high Cl^{−} ion concentration and low water content, whilst reducing the need for either high additional salt or acid concentrations, circumventing most oxide chemistry. Thus, the electrodissolution of sulfide minerals has demonstrated promising results in DES media in absence of passivation layers, with the release into the solution of metal ions which could be recovered from solution.

During extraction of copper from copper sulfide minerals with Ethaline, chalcocite (Cu_{2}S) and covellite (CuS) produce a yellow solution, indicating that [CuCl_{4}]^{2−} complex are formed. Meanwhile, in the solution formed from chalcopyrite, Cu^{2+} and Cu^{+} species co-exist in solution due to the generation of reducing Fe^{2+} species at the cathode. The best selective recovery of copper (>97%) from chalcopyrite can be obtained with a mixed DES of 20 wt.% ChCl-oxalic acid and 80 wt.% Ethaline.

==== Metal recovery from oxide compounds with Ionometallurgy ====
Recovery of metals from oxide matrixes is generally carried out using mineral acids. However, electrochemical dissolution of metal oxides in DES can allow to enhance the dissolution up to more than 10 000 times in pH neutral solutions.

Studies have shown that ionic oxides such as ZnO tend to have high solubility in ChCl:malonic acid, ChCl:urea and Ethaline, which can resemble the solubilities in aqueous acidic solutions, e.g., HCl. Covalent oxides such as TiO_{2}, however, exhibits almost no solubility. The electrochemical dissolution of metal oxides is strongly dependent on the proton activity from the HBD, i.e. capability of the protons to act as oxygen acceptors, and on the temperature. It has been reported that eutectic ionic fluids of lower pH-values, such as ChCl:oxalic acid and ChCl:lactic acid, allow a better solubility than that of higher pH (e.g., ChCl:acetic acid). Hence, different solubilities can be obtained by using, for instance, different carboxylic acids as HBD.

=== Outlook ===
Currently, the stability of most ionic liquids under practical electrochemical conditions is unknown, and the fundamental choice of ionic fluid is still empirical as there is almost no data on metal ion thermodynamics to feed into solubility and speciation models. Also, there are no Pourbaix diagrams available, no standard redox potentials, and bare knowledge of speciation or pH-values. It must be noticed that most processes reported in the literature involving ionic fluids have a Technology Readiness Level (TRL) 3 (experimental proof-of-concept) or 4 (technology validated in the lab), which is a disadvantage for short-term implementation. However, ionometallurgy has the potential to effectively recover metals in a more selective and sustainable way, as it considers environmentally benign solvents, reduction of greenhouse gas emissions and avoidance of corrosive and harmful reagents.
