= Sepro Mineral Systems =

Canadian mineral processing company

Sepro Mineral Systems Corp.
- Type: Privately Held Company
- Industry: Basic resources, engineering
- Founded: 1987
- Headquarters: Langley, British Columbia, Canada
- Key people: Steve McAlister (Director), Mark Van Kleek (President and CEO)
- Products: Mineral Processing machinery and Process Engineering
- Subsidiaries: Met-Solve Laboratories Inc., iCON Gold Recovery Corp., Canamix Processing Systems, Carminex Systems
- Website: www.seprosystems.com

Sepro Mineral Systems Corp. is a Canadian company founded in 1987 and headquartered in British Columbia, Canada. The outcome of the acquisition of Sepro Mineral Processing International by Falcon Concentrators in 2008, the company's key focus is the production of mineral processing equipment for the mining and aggregate industries. Sepro Mineral Systems Corp. also provides engineering and process design services. Products sold by Sepro include grinding mills, ore scrubbers, vibrating screens, centrifugal gravity concentrators, agglomeration drums, and dense media separators. The company is also a supplier of single source modular pre-designed and custom designed plants and circuits.

Today, Sepro Mineral Systems Corp. is represented by global agents in over 15 countries and has equipment operating in over 31 countries around the world.

== Products ==
=== Falcon Gravity Concentrators ===
The Falcon Concentrator is a type of gravity separation device for the recovery of valuable metals and minerals. There are three types of Falcon Concentrators: Falcon Semi-Batch (SB), Falcon Continuous (C) and Falcon Ultra-Fine (UF). All models of Falcon Concentrator rely on the creation of centrifugal forces by way of a rapidly rotating, vertical bowl in order to stratify and separate particles based on weight. The amount of gravitational force generated and the method of collecting these heavier particles differs for each model.

==== Falcon Semi-Batch ====
The Falcon semi batch centrifugal concentrator is primarily used for the recovery of free (liberated) precious metals such as gold, silver and platinum. The machine generates forces up to 200 times the force of gravity (200 G's) and makes use of a two-stage rotating bowl for mineral separation. The smooth-walled lower portion is for particle stratification and then a fluidized upper portion is used for the collection of the heavier particles. The machine is stopped periodically to rinse and collect the valuable concentrate from the bowl. The Falcon SB concentrator is used for gold recovery at many mines around the world, including Quadra FNX Mining's Robinson mine in the United States, Newcrest's Telfer Gold Mine in Australia and the Sadiola Gold Mine (owned principally by AngloGold Ashanti and Iamgold) in Mali.

==== Falcon Continuous ====
The Falcon Continuous (C) centrifugal concentrator is primarily used for the separation of heavy minerals which occur in ore concentrations above 0.1% by weight, such as cassiterite, tantalum and scheelite. It is also used for coal cleaning and pre-concentration of gold bearing ores. The machine generates forces up to 300 times the force of gravity (300 G's) and operates by using a smooth-walled, rotating bowl to stratify the material into heavier and lighter fractions then uses pneumatic valves to control the amount of heavy material that reports to the concentrate collection stream. It does not use any fluidization water and relies entirely on centrifugal force for separation. The Falcon C concentrator is used in various process plants around the world, such as the Tanco mine in Canada, the Sekisovskoye mine in Kazakhstan and the Renison tin mine in Tasmania.

==== Falcon Ultra-Fine ====
The Falcon Ultra-Fine (UF) centrifugal concentrator is primarily used for the separation of heavy minerals which occur in ore concentrations above 0.1% by weight, such as cassiterite, tantalum and scheelite when the majority of the particles are smaller than 75 μm. The machine generates forces up to 600 times the force of gravity (600 G's) and uses a smooth-walled bowl for particle stratification with a pneumatically controlled rubber lip for heavy material collection. The machine is stopped periodically to rinse and collect the valuable concentrate from the bowl. Studies have found that the deposition of heavy material within the bowl can be predicted by a hindered settling model. The Falcon UF concentrator is used in a number of process plants around the world such as the Tanco mine in Canada and the Bluestone tin mine in Tasmania.

=== Sepro Tyre Drive Scrubbers ===
Scrubbers are material washers used to break down and disperse clays in order to prepare mineral ores or construction aggregates for further processing. Sepro Tyre Drive Scrubbers are manufactured up to 3.6m in diameter and are capable of processing up to 1500 tonnes per hour of material. Shell supported Scrubbers such as the Sepro PTD Scrubber minimize stress on the shell by spreading the power drive over the full length of the washing drum. These scrubbers operate in many applications on feeds with high clay content, and are commonly used for difficult ore and stone washing duties. A few specified applications of Sepro Scrubbers include removal of gold “robbing” carboniferous material and other contaminants from gold ores, the processing of bauxite ores for aluminum production, the washing of laterites (gold, nickel, cobalt) to liberate fine metals for gravity recovery, and the washing of crushed aggregate, gravel and sand to remove clay contamination.

=== Sepro Tyre Drive Agglomeration Drums ===
Sepro Agglomeration Drums are specifically designed to prepare feeds with high fines content on Gold and Base Metal heap loading operations. Processes where a Sepro Agglomeration Drum can be utilized include gold, copper, uranium and nickel laterite. The action in the agglomeration drum, combined with small additions of cement or lime, binds the fines into a "pelletised" product, which can be heaped and leached out without "pooling" and "channeling" caused by loss of heap permeability due to blinding by fines. The machine uses flexible rubber liners to prevent build up without the use of lifter bars and is adjustable on a pivotable base frame. Shell supported agglomerators such as the Sepro PTD Agglomeration Drum minimize stress on the shell by spreading the power drive over the full length of the unit.

=== Sepro Tyre Drive Grinding Mills ===
Sepro Tyre Driven Grinding Mills are designed for small and medium capacity grinding applications, specifically small tonnage plants, regrinding mills, reagent prep and lime slaking. Sepro Pneumatic Tyre Driven (PTD) mills provide an alternative to standard trunnion drive systems. The drive consists of multiple gears boxes and electric motors directly connected and controlled through an AC variable frequency drive. Shell supported mills such as the Sepro PTD mills minimize stress on the mill shell by spreading the power drive over the full length of the mill. Sepro Mills are suitable for ball, rod and pebble charges and are available with overflow or grate discharge to suit the application. Shell supported mills such as the Sepro PTD Grinding Mills minimize stress on the shell by spreading the power drive over the full length of the unit.

=== Condor Dense Medium Separators ===
The Condor Dense Medium Separator (DMS) is a multi-stage, high efficiency media separation machine for mineral processing operations at the rougher and scavenger stage. It is typically used in a pre-concentration duty prior to processing or milling to reject barren material. The unit is manufactured with either two or three stages of separation depending on the media with one or two valuable densities resulting, while the unit can produce up to four products from one dense medium vessel altogether. The Condor DMS can take a larger feed particle size compared to a DMS cyclone of the same diameter and capacity, and is capable of handling higher sinks or floats loading without affecting performance. The valuable dense material (or 'sinks') can be combined or separated at the final stage and is then pumped onto the next process in the circuit. Sepro Mineral Systems Corp. supplies customizable DMS Plants for a wide variety of application requirements. Sepro's standard two product (concentrate, tailings) DMS Plant utilizes a two-stage Condor Separator and single density medium circuit, while the three product (concentrate, middlings, tailings) DMS Plant utilizes a three-stage Condor Separator and two medium circuits at high and low density.

=== Sepro Leach Reactors ===
The Sepro Leach Reactor is a high concentration leach reactor developed to treat the gold concentrate produced by the Falcon Concentrator. The unit consists of a concentrate holding tank and an agitated leach tank which are linked by a peristaltic hose pump. The SLR uses either hydrogen peroxide, oxygen gas or a chemical accelerant like SeproLeach to achieve elevated levels of dissolved oxygen required to accelerate the leaching process. The pregnant leach solution produced can be directly electrowon. With the addition of an electrowinning unit the final product becomes a gold plated carbon that can be directly refined to produce gold bullion. Extensive test work of the SLR on site has shown over 99% of the target mineral is recovered through a simple, fully automated process that is easily incorporated into recovery operations. Sepro Mineral Systems Corp. supplies SLR units with capacities ranging from 1,000 to 50,000 kg (2,200 to 110,200 lb).

=== Sepro Pumps ===
Sepro supplies horizontal slurry pumps, vertical sump pumps, vertical froth pumps, vertical tank pumps and horizontal fluid process pump models which are metal lined or rubber lined, one option being SH46® material for advanced wear resistance. They are designed to operate in the mining, aggregate, chemical and industrial sectors. Applications suitable for Sepro Pumps include mill discharge, mineral concentrate, dense media, coarse / fine tailings, process water and aggregates. Sepro engineers mobile, modular and fixed mineral processing plant designs which incorporate the complete line of slurry, sump, froth, tank and fluid Sepro Pumps.

=== Sepro Blackhawk 100 Cone Crushers ===
The Sepro Blackhawk 100 Cone Crusher is a modern, hydraulically operated cone crusher designed to be simple, rugged and effective for heavy duty mining and aggregate applications. The combination of the speed and eccentric throw of the crusher provides fine crushing capability and high capacity in a very compact design. The Blackhawk is capable of being applied as a secondary or tertiary crusher as well as a pebble crusher. The Blackhawk 100 is driven directly via a flexible coupling to the electric drive motor. This arrangement eliminates the need for sheaves and v-belts, allowing for simplified operation and maintenance. A variable speed drive package is included to optimize the speed of the machine to the given liner profile, feed and production conditions.

=== Sepro Screens ===
Sepro Screens are used for a variety of particle size separation and dewatering duties in mineral processing and aggregate applications. In mineral processing applications, particle size separation is of utmost importance in order to optimize crushing, grinding and gravity separation as well as many other processes. In aggregate applications, proper size separation and dewatering is essential to generate a saleable product. High capacity capable and featuring interchangeable screen decks, Sepro-Sizetec Screens are used for gold ore processing, fine aggregates, industrial minerals, soil remediation and coal processing applications.

== Plants and process design ==
Sepro designs and builds modular and mobile processing plants for a wide range of mineral applications. Complete plants can be assembled using Sepro manufactured equipment along with equipment from third-party vendors and sub-contractors.

Sepro Mobile Plants are designed to be easily re-locatable as they are mounted on road transportable custom built trailer assemblies. These include the Sepro Mobile Mill Plant and Sepro Mobile Flotation Plant, both of which were installed by Banks Island Gold Ltd at the company's Yellow Giant Gold Property on the coast of British Columbia. They can be designed to encompass a wide variety of process options from crushing through to the final concentrate collection.

Sepro Modular and Skid Mounted Plants are engineered around structural elements that are simple and easy to erect on site. These plants can be designed with larger equipment for higher tonnage applications than that of the Sepro Mobile Plants. One example is a 360 TPD Gold Processing Plant Sepro supplied to ProEurasia LCC for the Vladimirskaya Project in Russia. This included milling, gravity and smelting circuits.

Sepro also offers standard process modules which are designed around a single recovery or procession option. Dense Media Separation and Gravity Concentration are two examples of standard Sepro process modules.
