= Mixer-settler =

Mineral extraction machine

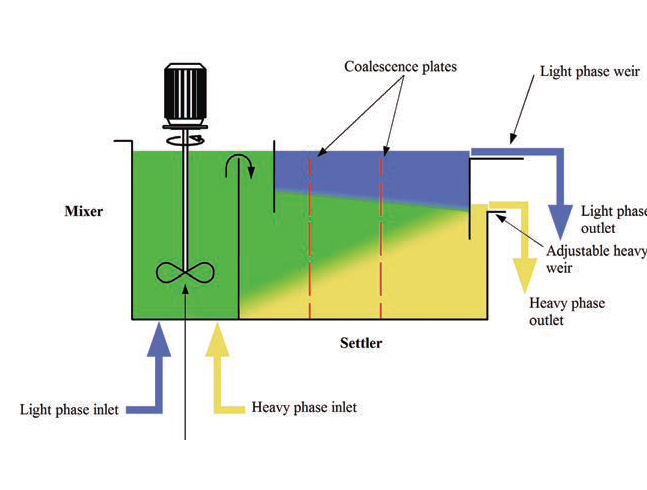
Mixer-settler scheme

Mixer settlers are a class of mineral process equipment used in the solvent extraction process. A mixer settler consists of a first stage that mixes the phases together followed by a quiescent settling stage that allows the phases to separate by gravity.

== Mixer ==
A mixing chamber where a mechanical agitator brings in intimate contact the feed solution and the solvent to carry out the transfer of solute(s). The mechanical agitator is equipped with a motor which drives a mixing and pumping turbine. This turbine draws the two phases from the settlers of the adjacent stages, mixes them, and transfers this emulsion to the associated settler. The mixer may consists of one or multiple stages of mixing tanks. Common laboratory mixers consist of a single mixing stage, whereas industrial scale copper mixers may consist of up to three mixer stages where each stage performs a combined pumping and mixing action. Use of multiple stages allows a longer reaction time and also minimizes the short circuiting of unreacted material through the mixers.

== Settler ==
A settling chamber where the two phases separate by static decantation. Coalescence plates facilitate the separation of the emulsion into two phases (heavy and light). The two phases then pass to continuous stages by overflowing the light phase and heavy phase weirs. The height of the heavy phase weir can be adjusted in order to position the heavy/light interphase in the settling chamber based on the density of each one of the phases. The settler is a calm pool downstream of the mixer where the liquids are allowed to separate by gravity. The liquids are then removed separately from the end of the mixer.

== Use ==
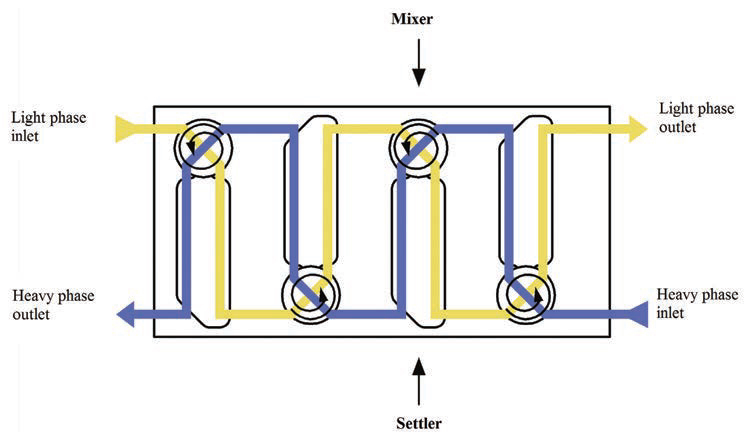
4 stage battery of mixer-settlers for counter-current extraction

Industrial mixer settlers are commonly used in the copper, nickel, uranium, lanthanide, and cobalt hydrometallurgy industries, when solvent extraction processes are applied. They are also used in the Nuclear reprocessing field to separate and purify primarily Uranium and Plutonium, removing the fission product impurities.

In the multiple countercurrent process, multiple mixer settlers are installed with mixing and settling chambers located at alternating ends for each stage (since the outlet of the settling sections feed the inlets of the adjacent stage's mixing sections). Mixer-settlers are used when a process requires longer residence times and when the solutions are easily separated by gravity. They require a large facility footprint, but do not require much headspace, and need limited remote maintenance capability for occasional replacement of mixing motors. (Colven, 1956; Davidson, 1957)

The equipment units can be arrayed as:

- extraction (moving an ion of interest from an aqueous phase to an organic phase),
- washing (rinsing entrained aqueous contaminant out of an organic phase containing the ion of interest), and
- stripping (moving an ion of interest from an organic phase into an aqueous phase).

== Copper Example ==
In the case of oxide copper ore, a heap leaching pad will dissolve a dilute copper sulfate solution in a weak sulfuric acid solution. This pregnant leach solution (PLS) is pumped to an extraction mixer settler where it is mixed with the organic phase (a kerosene hosted extractant). The copper transfers to the organic phase, and the aqueous phase (now called raffinate) is pumped back to the heap to recover more copper.

In a high-chloride environment typical of Chilean copper mines, a wash stage will rinse any residual pregnant solution entrained in the organic with clean water.

The copper is then stripped from organic phase in the strip stage into a strong sulfuric acid solution suitable for electrowinning. This strong acid solution is called barren electrolyte when it enters the cell, and strong electrolyte when it is copper bearing after reacting in the cell.

== See also ==
- Solvent extraction
- Hydrometallurgy
- Mineral processing
