= Lixiviant =

Chemicals used to extract metal from ore

A lixiviant is a chemical used in hydrometallurgy to extract elements from its ore. The term lixiviant can be somewhat obscure, as it is not mentioned in reviews of metallurgy.

== Extraction of gold ==
One of the most famous lixiviants is cyanide, which is used in extracting 90% of mined gold. The combination of cyanide and the oxygen in air converts gold particles into a soluble salt. Once separated from the bulk gangue, the solution is processed in a series of steps to give the metal. A wide variety of less toxic alternatives to cyanide have been evaluated including thioureas, thiocyanate, and thiosulfate. Several of these lixiviants are applicable to metals other than gold.

== Dissolution of other metals ==
Typically lixiviants are applied to the extraction of ions of valuable metals from some processed form of an ore. Lixiviants are also used for the recovery of metals from wastes and scrap. Circuit boards and spent catalysts often contain platinum and other valuable metals. Some of the lixiviants that have been evaluated in such situations include: aqua regia, cyanide (as in gold extraction), hydrogen peroxide, and iodide/iodine.

Lixiviants have also been applied to the recycling of lithium ion batteries.

"Lixiviant systems" also refer to the dissolution of purified metals. The purpose of such a process is to produce metal complexes for synthesis or for analysis. As for gold, the lixiviant must include an oxidant, which can include halogens, and a Lewis base, which can be a thiourea.

== Etymology ==
The origin is the word lixiviate, meaning to leach or to dissolve out, deriving from the Latin lixivium. A lixiviant assists in rapid and complete leaching, for example during in situ leaching. The metal can be recovered from it in a concentrated form after leaching.

== See also ==
- Cementation refers to processes that reverse the action of a lixiviant.
