= Non-ferrous extractive metallurgy =

Metallurgy process

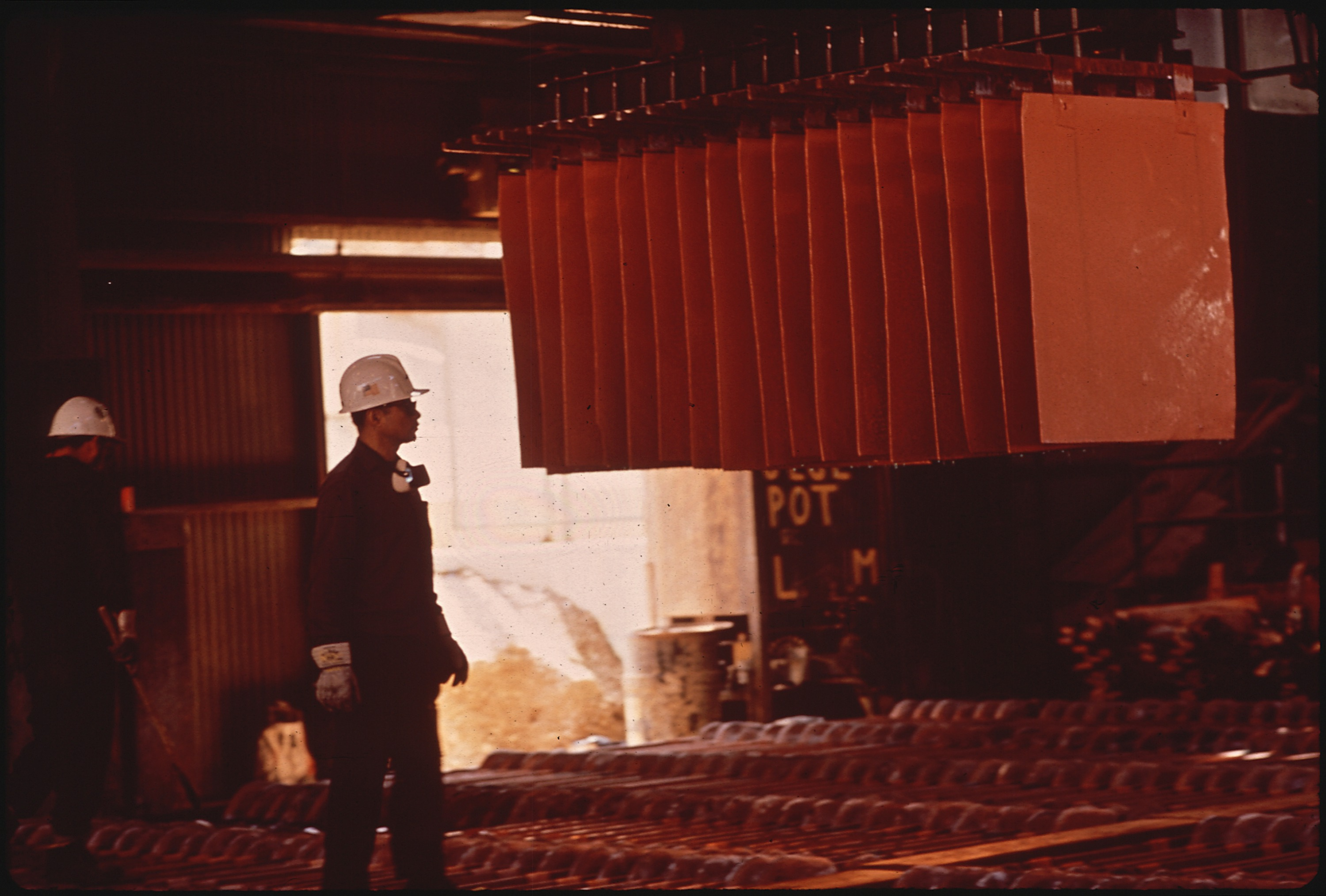
Electrowinning of copper

Non-ferrous extractive metallurgy is one of the two branches of extractive metallurgy which pertains to the processes of reducing valuable, non-iron metals from ores or raw material. Metals like zinc, copper, lead, aluminium as well as rare and noble metals are of particular interest in this field, while the more common metal, iron, is considered a major impurity. Like ferrous extraction, non-ferrous extraction primarily focuses on the economic optimization of extraction processes in separating qualitatively and quantitatively marketable metals from its impurities (gangue).

Any extraction process will include a sequence of steps or unit processes for separating highly pure metals from undesirables in an economically efficient system. Unit processes are usually broken down into three categories: pyrometallurgy, hydrometallurgy, and electrometallurgy. In pyrometallurgy, the metal ore is first oxidized through roasting or smelting. The target metal is further refined at high temperatures and reduced to its pure form. In hydrometallurgy, the object metal is first dissociated from other materials using a chemical reaction, which is then extracted in pure form using electrolysis or precipitation. Finally, electrometallurgy generally involves electrolytic or electrothermal processing. The metal ore is either distilled in an electrolyte or acid solution, then magnetically deposited onto a cathode plate (electrowinning); or smelted then melted using an electric arc or plasma arc furnace (electrothermic reactor).

Another major difference in non-ferrous extraction is the greater emphasis on minimizing metal losses in slag. This is widely due to the exceptional scarcity and economic value of certain non-ferrous metals which are, inevitably, discarded during the extraction process to some extent. Thus, material resource scarcity and shortages are of great concern to the non-ferrous industry. Recent developments in non-ferrous extractive metallurgy now emphasize the reprocessing and recycling of rare and non-ferrous metals from secondary raw materials (scrap) found in landfills.

== History ==
=== Prehistory of non-ferrous extractive metallurgy ===
In general, prehistoric extraction of metals, particularly copper, involved two fundamental stages: first, the smelting of copper ore at temperatures exceeding 700 °C is needed to separate the gangue from the copper; second, melting the copper, which requires temperatures exceeding its melting point of 1080 °C. Given the available technology at the time, accomplishing these extreme temperatures posed a significant challenge. Early smelters developed ways to effectively increase smelting temperatures by feeding the fire with forced flows of oxygen.

Copper extraction in particular is of great interest in archeometallurgical studies since it dominated other metals in Mesopotamia from the early Chalcolithic until the mid-to-late sixth century BC. There is a lack of consensus among archaeometallurgists on the origin of non-ferrous extractive metallurgy. Some scholars believe that extractive metallurgy may have been simultaneously or independently discovered in several parts of the world. The earliest known use of pyrometallurgical extraction of copper occurred in Belovode, eastern Serbia, from the late sixth to early fifth millennium BC. However, there is also evidence of copper smelting in Tal-i-Iblis, southeastern Iran, which dates back to around the same period. During this period, copper smelters used large in-grown pits filled with coal, or crucibles to extract copper, but by the fourth millennium BC this practice had begun to phase out in favor of the smelting furnace, which had a larger production capacity. From the third millennium onward, the invention of the reusable smelting furnace was crucial to the success of large-scale copper production and the robust expansion of the copper trade through the Bronze Age.

The earliest silver objects began appearing in the late fourth millennium BC in Anatolia, Turkey. Prehistoric silver extraction is strongly associated with the extraction of the less valuable metal, lead; although evidence of lead extraction technology predates silver by at least 3 millennia. Silver and lead extractions are also associated because the argentiferous (silver-bearing) ores used in the process often contain both elements.

In general, prehistoric silver recovery was broken down into three phases: First, the silver-lead ore is roasted to separate the silver and lead from the gangue. The metals are then melted at high temperature ( greater than 1100 °C) in the crucible while air is blown over the molten metal (cupellation). Finally, lead is oxidized to form lead monoxide (PbO) or is absorbed into the walls of the crucible, leaving the refined silver behind.

The silver-lead cupellation method was first used in Mesopotamia between 4000 and 3500 BC. Silver artifacts, dating around 3600 BC, were discovered in Naqada, Egypt. Some of these cast silver artifacts contained less than 0.5% lead, which strongly indicates cupellation.

=== Early to late Anglo-Saxon cupellation ===
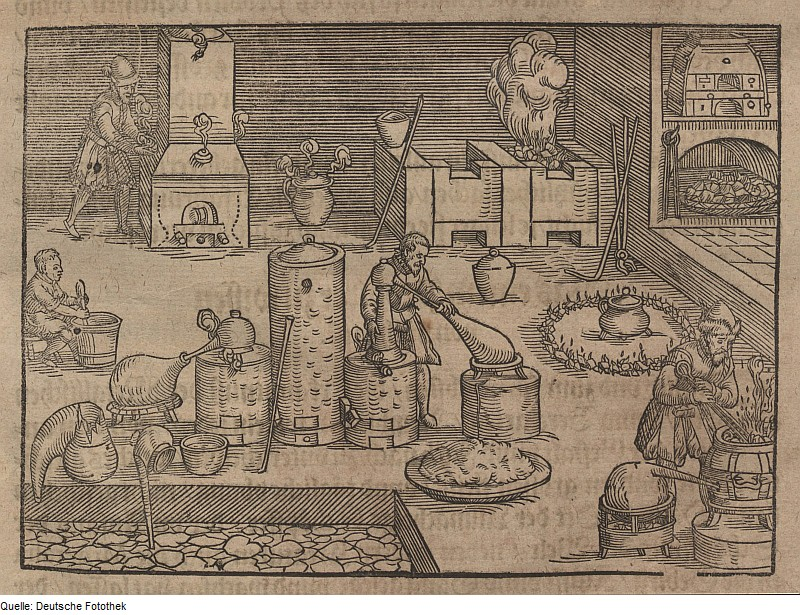
Medieval smelting plant

Cupellation was also being used in parts of Europe to extract gold, silver, zinc, and tin by the late ninth to tenth century AD. Here, one of the earliest examples of an integrated unit process for extracting more than one precious metal was first introduced by Theophilus around the twelfth century. First, the gold-silver ore is melted down in the crucible, but with an excess amount of lead. The intense heat then oxidizes the lead which reacts quickly and binds with the impurities in the gold-silver ore. Since both gold and silver have low reactivity with the impurities, they remain behind once the slag is removed. The last stage involves parting, in which the silver is separated from the gold. First the gold-silver alloy is hammered into thin sheets and placed into a vessel. The sheets were then covered in urine, which contains sodium chloride (NaCl). The vessel is then capped and heated for several hours until the chlorides bind with the silver, creating silver chloride (AgCl). Finally, the silver chloride powder is then removed and smelted to recover the silver, while the pure gold remains intact.

=== Hydrometallurgy in Chinese antiquity ===
During the Song dynasty, Chinese copper output from domestic mining was in decline and the resulting shortages caused miners to seek alternative methods for extracting copper. The discovery of a new “wet process” for extracting copper from mine water was introduced between the eleventh and twelfth century, which helped to mitigate their loss of supply.

Similar to the Anglo-Saxon method for cupellation, the Chinese employed the use of a base metal to extract the target metal from its impurities. First, the base metal, iron, is hammered into thin sheets. The sheets are then placed into a trough filled with “vitriol water” i.e., copper mining water which is then left to steep for several day. The mining water contains copper salts in the form of copper sulfate CuSO_{4}. The iron then reacts with the copper, displacing it from the sulfate ions, causing the copper to precipitate onto the iron sheets, forming a "wet" powder. Finally, the precipitated copper is collected and refined further through the traditional smelting process. This is the first large-scale use of a hydrometallurgical process.

== See also ==
- Hall–Héroult process
- Merrill-Crowe process
- Copper extraction techniques
- Cobalt extraction techniques
- History of metallurgy in China
- Experimental archaeometallurgy
