= Hydrometallurgy =

Ore extraction process

Hydrometallurgy is a technique within the field of extractive metallurgy, the obtaining of metals from their ores. Hydrometallurgy uses solutions to recover metals from ores, concentrates, and recycled or residual materials. Usually the extracting solution is aqueous (water-based), often containing additives such as acids. In select cases, the extracting solvent is nonaqueous. Processing techniques that complement hydrometallurgy are pyrometallurgy, vapour metallurgy, and molten salt electrometallurgy. Hydrometallurgy is typically divided into three general areas:

- Leaching
- Solution concentration and purification
- Metal or metal compound recovery

== Leaching ==
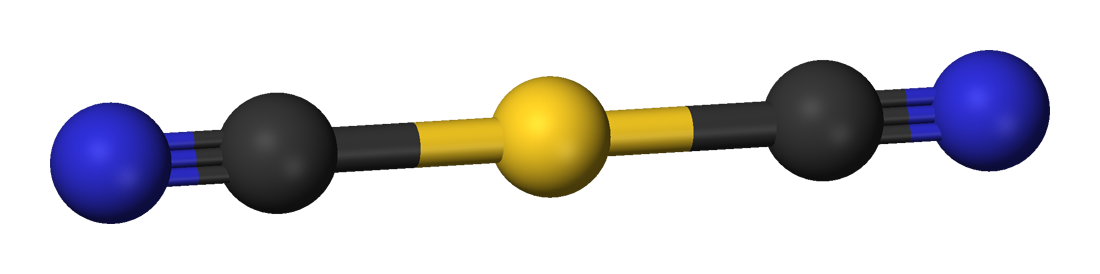
Dicyanoaurate(I) ([Au(CN)_{2}]^{−}) is the product of heap-leaching of low-grade gold ore.

Leaching involves the use of aqueous solutions to extract metal from metal-bearing materials. The extracting solution is called a lixiviant. The lixiviant is optimized in terms of pH, oxidation-reduction potential, presence of chelating agents, and temperature. In a simple implementation, a slurry of the pulverized ore in the lixiviant solution is filtered to yield a solution containing the metal ion(s) of interest. For example copper in its carbonate minerals such as malachite dissolve in aqueous sulfuric acid. On the other hand, copper sulfide minerals, which are more prevalent, are not amenable to hydrometallurgy, at least until they have been roasted. Hydrometallurgy is used to extract rare earths.

By using chelating agents, one can selectively extract certain metals..

Some leaching reactor configurations are in-situ, heap, vat leaching, tank, and autoclave. In-situ leaching is also called "solution mining" involves pumped extracting solution into the deposit. The Beverley uranium deposit is an example of in-situ leaching.

In heap leaching, crushed (and sometimes agglomerated) ore is piled in a heap on top of an impervious sheet. Leach solution is sprayed over the top of the heap and allowed to percolate downward through the heap. The heap design usually incorporates collection sumps, which allow the "pregnant" leach solution (i.e. solution with dissolved valuable metals) to be pumped for further processing. An example is gold cyanidation, where pulverized ores are extracted with a solution of sodium cyanide, which, in the presence of air, dissolves the gold, leaving behind mostly nonprecious residue.

== Solution concentration and purification ==
After leaching, the leach liquor must normally undergo concentration of the metal ions that are to be recovered. Additionally, undesirable metal ions sometimes require removal.

- Precipitation is the selective removal of a compound of the targeted metal or removal of a major impurity by precipitation of one of its compounds. Copper is precipitated as its sulfide as a means to purify nickel leachates.
- Cementation is the conversion of the metal ion to the metal by a redox reaction. A typical application involves addition of scrap iron to a solution of copper ions. Iron dissolves and copper metal is deposited.
- Solvent Extraction
- Ion exchange
- Gas reduction. Treating a solution of nickel and ammonia with hydrogen affords nickel metal as its powder.
- Electrowinning is a particularly selective if expensive electrolysis process applied to the isolation of precious metals. Gold can be electroplated from its solutions.

=== Solvent extraction ===
In the solvent extraction a mixture of an extractant in a solvent (sometimes called a diluent) is used to extract a metal ions from one phase to another. In solvent extraction this mixture is often referred to as the "organic" because the main constituent (diluent) is some type of hydrocarbon derivative. Di(2-ethylhexyl)phosphoric acid (the extractant) and tributyl phosphate (the diluent) are used for the liquid–liquid extraction from aqueous solutions. The combination of di(2-ethylhexyl)phosphoric acid and tributyl phosphate are also used in nuclear reprocessing.

=== Ion exchange ===
Chelating agents, natural zeolite, activated carbon, ion exchange resins, and liquid organics impregnated with chelating agents are all used to exchange cations or anions with the solution.

== Metal recovery ==
Metal recovery is the final step in a hydrometallurgical process, in which metals suitable for sale as raw materials are produced. Sometimes, however, further refining is needed to produce ultra-high purity metals. The main types of metal recovery processes are electrolysis, gaseous reduction, and precipitation. For example, a major target of hydrometallurgy is copper, which is conveniently obtained by electrolysis. Cu^{2+} ions are reduced to Cu metal at low potentials, leaving behind contaminating metal ions such as Fe^{2+} and Zn^{2+}.

=== Electrolysis ===
Electrowinning and electrorefining respectively involve the recovery and purification of metals using electrodeposition of metals at the cathode, and either metal dissolution or a competing oxidation reaction at the anode.

=== Precipitation ===
Precipitation in hydrometallurgy involves the chemical precipitation from aqueous solutions, either of metals and their compounds or of the contaminants. Precipitation will proceed when, through reagent addition, evaporation, pH change or temperature manipulation, the amount of a species present in the solution exceeds the maximum determined by its solubility.

=== Research ===
Peptides with high affinity for certain metals have been attached to magnetic nanoparticles as a means of selectively extraction.

== History ==
In China in the 11th and 12th centuries, this technique was used to extract copper; this was used for much of the total copper production. In the 17th century it was used for the same purposes in Germany and Spain.
