= Primene amines =

In chemistry, primene amines are mixtures of long-chain branched primary amines. One member of this class of amine is tert-octylamine, H_{2}NC(CH_{3})_{2}(CH_{2})_{4}CH_{3}. These compounds have a faint ammonia-like odor. The compounds are colorless, although typical commercial samples are yellowish owing to the presence of impurities. Primene amines are used as used in solvent extractions.
