= Di(2-ethylhexyl)phosphoric acid =

Names
- Preferred IUPAC name Bis(2-ethylhexyl) hydrogen phosphate
- Other names Bis(2-ethylhexyl) phosphoric acid Bis(2-ethylhexyl) phosphate Bis(2-ethylhexyl) hydrophosphoric acid BEHPA; BEHP; BEHHPA; BEHHP; Di(2-ethylhexyl) phosphoric acid DEHPA; D2EHPA; EHPA

Identifiers
CAS Number	298-07-7
3D model (JSmol)	Interactive image
ChemSpider	8918
ECHA InfoCard	100.005.507
PubChem CID	9275
UNII	2Z4W0L3H06
CompTox Dashboard (EPA)	DTXSID1027134
- InChI: InChI=1S/C16H35O4P/c1-5-9-11-15(7-3)13-19-21(17,18)20-14-16(8-4)12-10-6-2/h15-16H,5-14H2,1-4H3,(H,17,18) Key: SEGLCEQVOFDUPX-UHFFFAOYSA-N; InChI=1/C16H35O4P/c1-5-9-11-15(7-3)13-19-21(17,18)20-14-16(8-4)12-10-6-2/h15-16H,5-14H2,1-4H3,(H,17,18) Key: SEGLCEQVOFDUPX-UHFFFAOYAP
- SMILES: CCCCC(CC)COP(=O)(O)OCC(CC)CCCC

Properties
Chemical formula	C_{16}H_{35}O_{4}P
Molar mass	322.43 g/mol
Appearance	odorless colorless liquid (impure samples are often yellow)
Density	0.9758 g/mL
Melting point	−50 °C (−58 °F; 223 K)
Boiling point	393 °C (739 °F; 666 K)
- Except where otherwise noted, data are given for materials in their standard state (at 25 °C [77 °F], 100 kPa). verify (what is ?) Infobox references

Di(2-ethylhexyl)phosphoric acid (DEHPA or HDEHP) is an organophosphate with the formula (C_{8}H_{17}O)_{2}PO_{2}H. The colorless liquid is a diester of phosphoric acid and 2-ethylhexanol. It is used in the solvent extraction of uranium, vanadium and the rare-earth metals.

== Preparation ==
DEHPA is prepared through the reaction of phosphorus pentoxide and 2-ethylhexanol:

4 C_{8}H_{17}OH + P_{4}O_{10} → 2 [(C_{8}H_{17}O)PO(OH)]_{2}O
[(C_{8}H_{17}O)PO(OH)]_{2}O + C_{8}H_{17}OH → (C_{8}H_{17}O)_{2}PO(OH) + (C_{8}H_{17}O)PO(OH)_{2}

These reaction produce a mixture of mono-, di-, and trisubstituted phosphates, from which DEHPA can be isolated based on solubility.

== Use in lanthanide extraction ==
DEHPA can be used to extract lanthanides (rare earths) from aqueous solutions, it is commonly used in the lanthanide sector as an extraction agent. In general the distribution ratio of the lanthanides increase as their atomic number increases due to the lanthanide contraction. It is possible by bringing a mixture of lanthanides in a counter current mixer settler bank into contact with a suitable concentration of nitric acid to selectively strip (back extract) some of the lanthanides while leaving the others still in the DEHPA based organic layer. In this way selective stripping of the lanthanides can be used to make a separation of a mixture of the lanthanides into mixtures containing fewer lanthanides. Under ideal conditions this can be used to obtain a single lanthanide from a mixture of many lanthanides.

It is common to use DEHPA in an aliphatic kerosene which is best considered to be a mixture of long chain alkanes and cycloalkanes. When used in an aromatic hydrocarbon diluent the lanthanide distribution ratios are lower. It has been shown that it is possible to use a second generation biodiesel which was made by the hydrotreatment of vegetable oil. It has been reported that Neste's HVO100 is a suitable diluent for DEHPA when calcium, lanthanum and neodymium are extracted from aqueous nitric acid.

== Use in uranium extraction ==
=== Extraction ===
DEHPA is used in the solvent extraction of uranium salts from solutions containing the sulfate, chloride, or perchlorate anions. This extraction is known as the “Dapex procedure” (dialkyl phosphoric extraction). Reminiscent of the behaviours of carboxylic acids, DEHPA generally exists as a hydrogen-bonded dimer in the non-polar organic solvents. For practical applications, the solvent, often called a diluent, is typically kerosene. A complex is formed from two equivalents of the conjugate base of DEHPA and one uranyl ion. Complexes of the formula (UO_{2})_{2}[(O_{2}P(OR)_{2}]_{4} also form, and at high concentrations of uranium, polymeric complexes may form.

The extractability of Fe^{3+} is similar to that of uranium, so it must be reduced to Fe^{2+} before the extraction.

=== Stripping ===
The uranium is then stripped from the DEHPA/kerosene solution with hydrochloric acid, hydrofluoric acid, or carbonate solutions. Sodium carbonate solutions effectively strip uranium from the organic layer, but the sodium salt of DEHPA is somewhat soluble in water, which can lead to loss of the extractant.

=== Synergistic effects ===
The extractive capabilities of DEHPA can be increased through synergistic effects by the addition of other organophosphorus compounds. Tributyl phosphate is often used, as well as dibutyl-, diamyl-, and dihexylphosphonates. The synergistic effects are thought to occur by the addition of the trialkylphosphate to the uranyl-DEHPA complex by hydrogen bonding. The synergistic additive may also react with the DEHPA, competing with the uranyl extraction, resulting in a decrease in extraction efficiency past a concentration specific to the compound.

=== Alternatives to DEHPA ===
Alternative organophosphorus compounds include trioctylphosphine oxide and bis(2,4,4-trimethyl pentyl)phosphinic acid. Secondary, tertiary, and quaternary amines have also been used for some uranium extractions. Compared to phosphate extractants, amines are more selective for uranium, extract the uranium faster, and are easily stripped with a wider variety of reagents. However, the phosphates are more tolerant of solids in the feed solution and show faster phase separation.
