= Pulsed columns =

Pulsed columns are a type of liquid-liquid extraction equipment; examples of this class of extraction equipment is used at the BNFL plant THORP.

Special use in nuclear industries for fuel reprocessing, where spent fuel from reactors is subjected to solvent extraction. A pulsation is created using air by a pulse leg. The feed is aqueous solution containing radioactive solutes, and the solvent used is TBP (Tri-Butyl Phosphate) in suitable hydrocarbon. To create turbulence for dispersion of one phase in other, a mechanical agitator is used in conventional equipments. But, because of radioactivity, and frequent maintenance required for mechanical agitators, pulsing is used in extraction columns.
