= Reactive liquid extraction =

A reactive liquid extraction process is a liquid-liquid extraction process that is intensified through a mechanism involving a reversible reaction between the extracted chemical species and a host chemical species constituting, or present in, the extractant.
