= Astrometallurgy =

Field of research

Astrometallurgy is the study of mineral processing and metal extraction from extra-terrestrial resources including the Moon, Mars, asteroids, and other celestial bodies. A specialised form of extractive metallurgy, this discipline is closely linked to space in-situ resource utilisation (ISRU) or space resource utilisation (SRU).

== Background ==
The study of resource extraction in space dates back to the pre-Apollo era, with the majority of focus placed on oxygen extraction for use as a propellant and for life support. The extraction and use of space resources (in space) is justified by the large cost associated with the launch of materials to support missions and eventual bases or habitats. Sourcing materials from sources other than Earth is argued to significantly reduce upmass and mission costs.

Oxygen as a target was quickly followed by research into the use of planetary dirt or 'regolith' being used for construction and manufacturing purposes both in-situ on bodies like the Moon, and also for in-space manufacturing. While earlier research into oxygen extraction from the oxides found in planetary dirt would have resulted in the production of metals as a byproduct, the specific targeting of metals as a primary extraction target only originates in the mid to late 2010's.

=== Etymology ===
The word 'astrometallurgy' seems to be derived from 'astro-' meaning space or extra-terrestrial, and "metallurgy" meaning the study of metals and metal extraction.

== Processes ==
Many of the processes currently being studied for use in astrometallurgical applications are very similar in concept to their terrestrial counterparts. The significant challenge is the conversion of these existing technologies for use in the harsh environment of space namely: the vacuum or low pressure, low- or micro-gravity conditions, cost of resupply and transport, energy availability, large temperature changes, and need for automation due to the difficulty of human intervention.

=== Mineral processing ===
Mineral processing techniques are often used to create a mineral concentrate from an ore prior to metal extraction, this is done to reduce the energy requirements and minimise contaminants in the final metal product.

In the context of astrometallurgy, due to the general lack of available liquid water in space, mineral processing techniques that can operate on a dry raw material are preferred. These processes include electrostatic separation, magnetic separation, and induced gravity separation.

=== Metal extraction ===
The extraction of metals from either a raw material, or from a mineral concentrate, is achieved using some mixture of thermal, chemical, and electrical energy to separate out the metal atoms from non-metal material.

Metal extraction processes for use in space that have been lab tested to date include:

- Carbothermal reduction
- Hydrogen reduction
- Molten salt electrolysis
- Molten oxide electrolysis
- Solid electrolysis
- Thermal decomposition
- Selective ionisation
- Ionic liquid extraction
- Metallothermic reduction
- Acid reduction
- Fluorine reduction
- Bio-reduction
- Carbochlorination

A more comprehensive list was published by Shaw et al.

== Current state of the art ==
As of Feb 2026, the extraction of metals in an extraterrestrial context has not been demonstrated. However, multiple space agencies and private companies have announced plans and payloads that will aim to demonstrate the ability to extract and use metals in space.
