= Thin layer extraction =

Lab technique

Thin layer extraction is a time-periodic reactive liquid extraction process that provides excellent mass transfer while maintaining phase separation. It is performed via a periodic batch production process that controls the time of each chemical reaction.

== Approach ==
A small amount of a liquid organic extract is spread, as a thin layer, onto a matrix made of a thin microporous material whose surfaces are freely accessible from and to the outside. The extract is held by capillary forces or other forces. This layer is alternately and repeatedly brought into brief contact with thin layers of the donor and the strip aqueous liquid. In the extraction step, selected species that are present in the donor solution are transported from the donor aqueous solution to the organic phase where a reaction ensues. In the stripping step the reaction reverses and the extracted species are stripped into the strip aqueous solution. Thus, two alternate product batches are generated: a raffinate and a strip product. As each of the species to be separated associates differently with the host, the composition of the raffinate and strip product is differentiated.

== Unique characteristics ==
With a typical liquid mass diffusivity in the order of 10^{−9} m^{2}/s, the characteristic time for diffusion through a 20 micron thick liquid layer is 0.4 s. Therefore, the thinness of both phases (organic and aqueous) causes a relatively "immediate" mass transfer of guest species from one phase to the other, which means that this process has a low mass transfer resistance. The low mass transfer resistance permits the uncoupling of effects attributed to mass transfer from the effects attributed to the reaction rates; it also allows relatively frequent cycling that helps mitigate the limited capacity that is due to the small batches of aqueous feed processed within each cycle.

== Application to kinetic reactive thin layer extraction ==
A secondary characteristic of thin layer extraction arises from the batch periodic mode of operation. It permits precise control in time and space over small processed elements in the course of the process, a degree of control that is not possible in any other liquid-liquid extraction method. This control is instrumental in enabling the exploitation of differences in reaction rates of the different species (see Thermodynamic versus kinetic reaction control) and the "harvesting" of separated species early on the reaction trajectories where the relative differences in concentration are largest. This forms the basis for kinetic, reactive, thin layer extraction.

== Process conditions ==
The extractant, including the host, must be substantially insoluble in the processed aqueous solutions to avoid being washed away. However, the difference in density between the immiscible phases, which plays an important role in conventional liquid-liquid extraction, is irrelevant in thin layer extraction.

== Potential applications ==
When the separation of two closely related compounds by liquid-liquid extraction is necessary, conventional wisdom indicates that a selective extractant must be found that will discern between the two by associating each to different equilibrium compositions.

Thin layer extraction is recommended for the separation of high-value products that are produced in moderate volumes (for example the separation of chiral molecules).

== Equipment ==
Thin layer extraction is used in specialized equipment operated as robots consisting of:

- The cartridge consists of a permeable, open, macro-porous matrix, made of a microporous solid substrate, compatible with the extractant phase, and accessible from/to the external world. The replaceable microporous matrix is initially wetted with the extractant, exposing a thin liquid layer on its surface without obstructing the macro-pores.
- The means to bring alternately small batches of the donor and strip solutions to cover as thin layers the thin extractant layer contained in defined matrix sections for a controlled time and then collect the product solutions. One method consists of spraying the solutions over sections of the matrix that exchange positions periodically to be exposed alternately to the donor and the strip solutions.
- The aqueous layers are then shaken off the matrix and collected as two distinct products. A second method consists of pneumatically pumping at a controlled velocity, in counter-current direction alternating small batches of the donor and strips solutions through a bundle of microporous capillaries. This second method permits a programmable number of stages but does not allow changes in the organic to aqueous ratio (O/W).
- A programmable control system.

A thin layer extraction cell consists of a section of the matrix that takes turns at being alternately exposed to the donor and then the strip solutions. Each cell accepts two alternating aqueous feed batches and generates two corresponding alternating batches of the products.

In multistage operation, a train of cells is operated synchronously with the products from one cell directed as feeds to a next upstream or downstream cell.

Multistage thin layer extraction scheme

The multistage thin layer extraction equipment is linearly scalable, permitting results obtained on table-top laboratory devices to be directly scaled up to full-scale production plants.
