= Red oil =

By-product substance

Red oil is defined as a substance of varying composition formed when an organic solution, typically tri-n-butyl phosphate (TBP, an agent used for extracting heavy metals in nuclear reprocessing plants) and its diluent, comes in contact with concentrated nitric acid at a temperature above 120 °C.

Red oil is relatively stable below 130 °C, but it can decompose explosively when its temperature is raised above 130 °C. Three red oil events have occurred in the United States: at the Hanford Site in 1953, and at the Savannah River Site (SRS) in 1953 and 1975. A red oil explosion also occurred in 1993 at the Tomsk-7 site at Seversk, Russia.

Generic types of equipment capable of producing red oil in the complex are categorized as evaporators, acid concentrators, and denitrators. The chemicals necessary to produce red oil are, at a minimum, TBP and nitric acid; other, contributory chemicals can include diluent (kerosene-like liquid used to dilute TBP) and/or aqueous phase metal nitrates.

Controls for prevention or mitigation of a red oil explosion are generally categorized as controls for temperature, pressure, mass, and concentration. Maintaining a temperature of less than 130 °C is generally accepted as a means to prevent red oil explosions. Sufficient venting serves to keep pressure from destroying the process vessel, while also providing the means for evaporative cooling to keep red oil from reaching the runaway temperature. Mass controls utilize decanters or hydrocyclones to remove organics from feedstreams entering process equipment capable of producing red oil. Limiting the total available TBP is another mass control that mitigates the consequence of a red oil explosion by limiting its maximum available explosive energy. Finally, concentration control can be utilized to keep the nitric acid below 10 M (moles/liter). A U.S. government study concluded that none of the controls should be used alone; rather, they should be used together to provide effective defense in depth for prevention of a red oil explosion.

== Ethylene ==
Within the ethylene industry, "Red oil" is an organic contaminant frequently encountered in caustic towers. The "red oil" is an organic polymer that forms from the aldol condensation of acetaldehyde in sodium hydroxide solution. Initially, the acetaldehyde forms a light floating yellow oil. Quickly this will continue to polymerize into a more familiar orangish/red color – hence the term "red oil". This red oil, particularly when aged, forms a more sticky heavy oil that is difficult to separate. This causes fouling and plugging issues in the caustic tower and downstream spent caustic handling systems, making red oil a contaminant that is closely monitored in the industry.
