= Tank leaching =

In metallurgical processes tank leaching is a hydrometallurgical method of extracting valuable material (usually metals) from ore.

== Tank vs. vat leaching ==
=== Factors ===
Tank leaching is usually differentiated from vat leaching on the following factors:

1. In tank leaching the material is ground sufficiently fine to form a slurry or pulp, which can flow under gravity or when pumped. In vat leaching typically a coarser material is placed in the vat for leaching, this reduces the cost of size reduction;
2. Tanks are typically equipped with agitators, baffles, gas introduction equipment designed to maintain the solids in suspension in the slurry, and achieve leaching. Vats usually do not contain much internal equipment, except for agitators.
3. Tank leaching is typically continuous, while vat leaching is operated in a batch fashion, this is not always the case, and commercial processes using continuous vat leaching have been tested;
4. Typically the retention time required for vat leaching is more than that for tank leaching to achieve the same percentage of recovery of the valuable material being leached;

In a tank leach the slurry is moved, while in a vat leach the solids remain in the vat, and solution is moved.

=== Processes ===
Tank and vat leaching involves placing ore, usually after size reduction and classification, into large tanks or vats at ambient operating conditions containing a leaching solution and allowing the valuable material to leach from the ore into solution.

In tank leaching the ground, classified solids are already mixed with water to form a slurry or pulp, and this is pumped into the tanks. Leaching reagents are added to the tanks to achieve the leaching reaction. In a continuous system the slurry will then either overflow from one tank to the next, or be pumped to the next tank. Ultimately the “pregnant” solution is separated from the slurry using some form of liquid/solid separation process, and the solution passes on to the next phase of recovery.

In vat leaching the solids are loaded into the vat, once full the vat is flooded with a leaching solution. The solution drains from the tank, and is either recycled back into the vat or is pumped to the next step of the recovery process. Vat leach units are rectangular containers (drums, barrels, tanks or vats), usually very big and made of wood or concrete, lined with material resistant to the leaching media. The treated ore is usually coarse.

The vats are usually run sequentially to maximize the contact time between the ore and the reagent. In such a series the leachate collected from one container is added to another vat with fresher ore

As mentioned previously tanks are equipped with agitators to keep the solids in suspension in the vats and improve the solid to liquid to gas contact. Agitation is further assisted by the use of tank baffles to increase the efficiency of agitation and prevent centrifuging of slurries in circular tanks...

== Extraction efficiency factors ==
Aside from chemical requirements several key factors influence extraction efficiency:

- Retention time - refers to the time spent in the leaching system by the solids. This is calculated as the total volumetric capacity of the leach tank/s divided by the volumetric throughput of the solid/liquid slurry. Retention time is commonly measured in hours for precious metals recovery. A sequence of leach tanks is referred to as a leach "train", and retention time is measured considering the total volume of the leach train. The desired retention time is determined during the testing phase, and the system is then designed to achieve this.
- Size - The ore must be ground to a size that exposes the desired mineral to the leaching agent (referred to as “liberation”), and in tank leaching this must be a size that can be suspended by the agitator. In vat leaching this is the size that is the most economically viable, where the recovery achieved as ore is ground finer is balanced against the increased cost of processing the material.
- Slurry density - The slurry density (percent solids) determines retention time. The settling rate and viscosity of the slurry are functions of the slurry density. The viscosity, in turn, controls the gas mass transfer and the leaching rate.
- Numbers of tanks - Agitated tank leach circuits are typically designed with no less than four tanks and preferably more to prevent short-circuiting of the slurry through the tanks.
- Dissolved gas - Gas is often injected below the agitator or into the vat to obtain the desired dissolved gas levels – typically oxygen, in some base metal plants sulphur dioxide may be required.
- Reagents - Adding and maintaining the appropriate amount of reagents throughout the leach circuit is critical to a successful operation. Adding insufficient quantities of reagents reduces the metal recovery but adding excess reagents increases the operating costs without recovering enough additional metal to cover the cost •of the reagents.

The tank leaching method is commonly used to extract gold and silver from ore, such as with the Sepro Leach Reactor.
