= Leaching (metallurgy) =

Metallurgical process used to extract valuable material from an ore

Leaching is a process widely used in extractive metallurgy where ore is treated with chemicals to convert the valuable metals within the ore, into soluble salts while the impurity remains insoluble. These can then be washed out and processed to give the pure metal; the materials left over are commonly known as tailings.

Compared to pyrometallurgy, leaching is easier to perform, requires less energy and is potentially less harmful as no gaseous pollution occurs. Drawbacks of leaching include its lower efficiency and the often significant quantities of waste effluent and tailings produced, which are usually either highly acidic or alkali as well as toxic (e.g. bauxite tailings).

There are four types of leaching:

1. Cyanide leaching (e.g. gold ore)
2. Ammonia leaching (e.g. crushed ore)
3. Alkali leaching (e.g. bauxite ore)
4. Acid leaching (e.g. sulfide ore)

Leaching is also notable in the extraction of rare earth elements, which consists of lanthanides, yttrium and scandium.

== Chemistry ==
Leaching is done in long pressure vessels which are cylindrical (horizontal or vertical) or of horizontal tube form known as autoclaves. A good example of the autoclave leach process can also be found in the metallurgy of zinc. It is best described by the following chemical reaction:

2 ZnS + O_{2} + 2 H_{2}SO_{4} → 2 ZnSO_{4} + 2 H_{2}O + 2 S

This reaction proceeds at temperatures above the boiling point of water, thus creating a vapour pressure inside the vessel. Oxygen is injected under pressure, making the total pressure in the autoclave more than 0.6 MPa and temperature at 473-523 K.

The leaching of precious metals such as gold can be carried out with cyanide or ozone under mild conditions.

== Historical uses ==
=== Origins ===
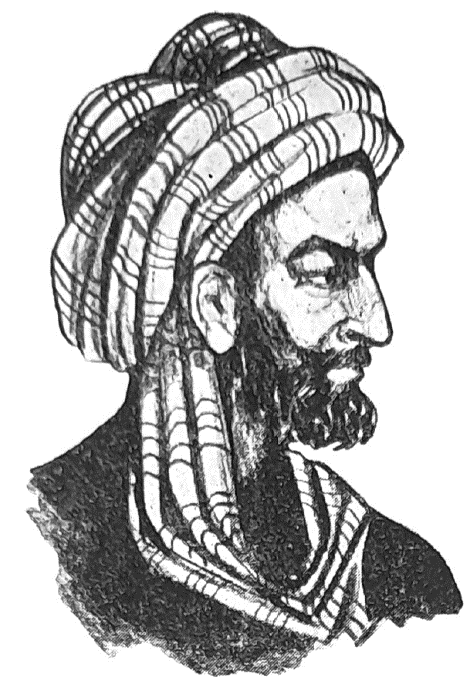
Jabir Ibn Hayyan, Persian alchemist and creator of "aqua regia."

Heap leaching dates back to the second century BC in China, where iron was combined with copper sulfate. By the time of the Northern Song dynasty, a copper alloy was able to be recovered by leaching.

Leaching can also be traced back to alchemy. Early examples of leaching performed by alchemists resembled mixing iron with copper sulfate, yielding a layer of metallic copper. In the eighth century, Jabir Ibn Hayyan, a Persian alchemist, discovered a substance he coined "aqua regia". Aqua regia, a combination of hydrochloric acid and nitric acid, was found to be effective in dissolving gold, which was previously thought to be insoluble.

=== Pre-World War II ===
In the sixteenth century, heap leaching became commonly used to extract copper and saltpeter from organic matter. Primarily used in Germany and Spain, pyrite would be brought to the surface and left out in the open. The pyrite would be set outside for months at a time, where rain and air exposure would lead to chemical weathering. A solution containing copper sulfide would be collected in a basin, then precipitated in a process called cementation, resulting in metallic copper. Heap leaching, in this natural chemical-free form, was further developed to obtain different, more economically viable, types of ore. This was done by incorporating chemical lixiviation, which applies more chemical manipulation and technique to heap leaching.

From 1767 to 1867, the production of potash in Quebec became an important industry to supply France's glass and soap manufacturers. Potash was most frequently made from the ash remains of wood-burning stoves and fireplaces, which were agitated with water and filtered. Once evaporated, the remains would be potash. 400 tons of hardwood would be required to burn to yield one ton of potash.

In 1858 Adolf Von Patera, a metallurgist in Austria, utilized lixiviation separate soluble and insoluble compounds from silver in an aqueous solution. Von Patera's process, though successful, did not generate much use due partly to the price of hyposulphite. Additionally, with Patera's process, if the sodium hyposulphite failed to dissolve perfectly, silver would often be caught in the extra solution and not properly extracted.

The technique of Patera's lixiviation was further developed by American E.H Russell around 1884, creating the "Russell Process". Prior leaching processes often could not concentrate ores with too much base metal, something thing the Russel Process was able to solve thus making it more lucrative.

In 1887, when the cyanidation process was patented in England, it began to phase out the existing Russell Process. Cyanidation was much more efficient and had a recovery rate of up to 90%.

Leading up to World War I, many new ideas for leaching processes were experimented. This included using ammonia solutions for copper sulfides, and nitric acid for leaching sulfide ores. Most of these ideas were phased out into obscurity due to the high cost of the leaching agents required.

=== Modern leaching ===
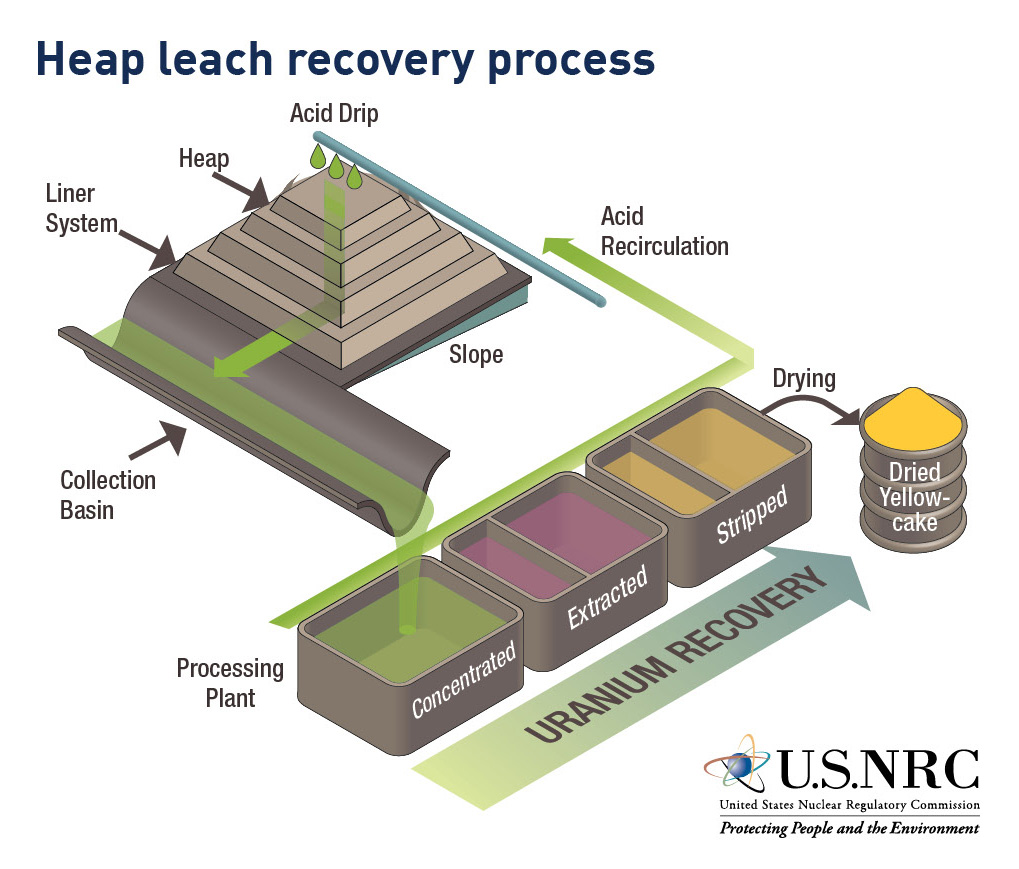
Heap leaching process diagram, specifically for uranium.

In the 1940s, as a result of the Manhattan Project, the United States government needed ready access to uranium. Many different techniques in leaching were quickly employed at a large scale. Both synthetic resins and organic solvents were used early on to extract uranium. Ultimately, the use of organic solvents was less tedious compared to ion exchange through synthetic resins, and further production of uranium and other rare earth metals moved towards solvent extraction.

In the 1950s, pressure hydrometallurgy was developed for the leaching of multiple different metals, such as sulfide concentrates and laterites. Particularly at the Mines Branch in Ottawa (now known as CANMET), it was demonstrated that pyrrhotite-penthandite concentrate could be treated in autoclaves, with the resulting nickel in a solution while iron oxide and sulfur remain in the residue. This process was later used in other nickel recovery operations across the globe.

In the 1960s, heap and in situ leaching became widely practiced, particularly for copper. In situ leaching was later used for the extraction of uranium as well.

Pressure leaching was further refined in the 1970s and 80s.

== See also ==
- Heap leaching
- In-situ leaching
- Tank leaching
- Uranium mining
