= Pregnant leach solution =

Pregnant leach solution or pregnant liquor solution (PLS) is acidic metal-laden water generated from stockpile leaching and heap leaching. Pregnant leach solution is used in the solvent extraction and electrowinning (SX/EW) process.

The portion of an original liquid that remains after other components have been dissolved by a solvent is called raffinate.
