= Electrometallurgy =

Production of metals by electrolysis

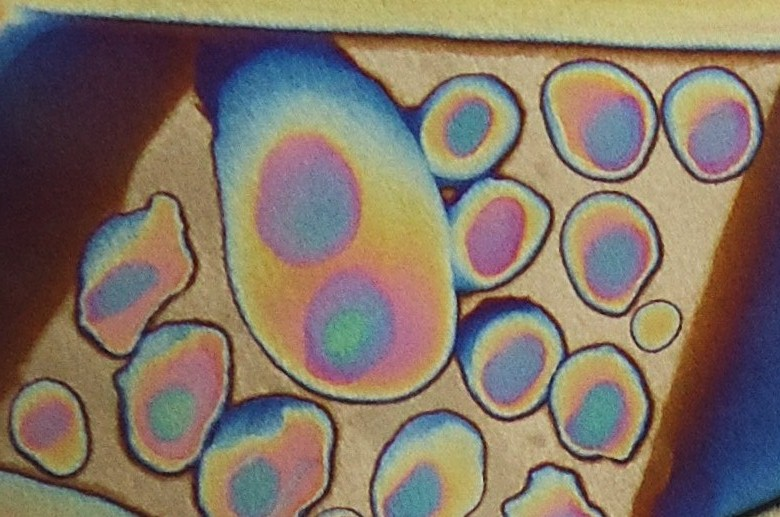
Anodized titanium

Electrometallurgy is a method in metallurgy that uses electrical energy to produce metals by electrolysis. It is usually the last stage in metal production and is therefore preceded by pyrometallurgical or hydrometallurgical operations. The electrolysis can be done on a molten metal oxide (smelt electrolysis) which is used for example to produce aluminium from aluminium oxide via the Hall-Hérault process. Electrolysis can be used as a final refining stage in pyrometallurgical metal production (electrorefining) and it is also used for reduction of a metal from an aqueous metal salt solution produced by hydrometallurgy (electrowinning).

== Processes ==
Electrometallurgy is the field concerned with the processes of metal electrodeposition. There are seven categories of these processes:

- Electrolysis
- Electrowinning, the extraction of metal from ores
- Electrorefining, the purification of metals. Metal powder production by electrodeposition is included in this category, or sometimes electrowinning, or a separate category depending on application.
- Electroplating, the deposition of a layer of one metal on another
- Electroforming, the manufacture of, usually thin, metal parts through electroplating
- Electropolishing, the removal of material from a metallic workpiece
- Etching, industrially known to Wikipedia as chemical milling

== Research trends ==
=== Molten oxide electrolysis ===
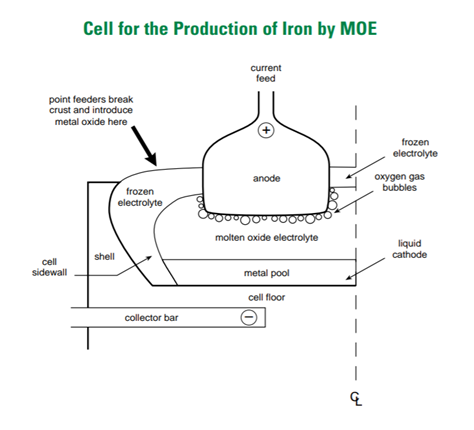
MOE scheme

Molten Oxide Electrolysis in steelmaking is utilizing electrons as the reducing agent instead of coke as in conventional blast furnace. For steel production, this method uses an inert anode (Carbon, Platinum, Iridium or Chromium-based alloy) and places iron ore in the cathode. The electrochemical reaction in this Molten Oxide cell can reach up to 1600 °C, a temperature that melts iron ore and electrolyte oxide. Then the molten iron ore decompose following this reaction:

Fe_{2}O_{3}(l) + e^{−} → Fe(l) + O_{2}(g)

The electrolysis reaction will produce molten pure iron as a main product and oxygen as its by-product. Because this process does not add coke in the process, no CO_{2} gas is produced. So no direct greenhouse gas emission. Moreover, if the electricity to run such cells comes from renewable sources, this process may have zero emissions. This technology also can be implemented for producing Nickel, Chromium, and Ferrochromium.

Currently the Massachusetts-based Boston Metal company is in a process to scale up this technology to an industrial level.

=== Direct decarburization electrorefining ===
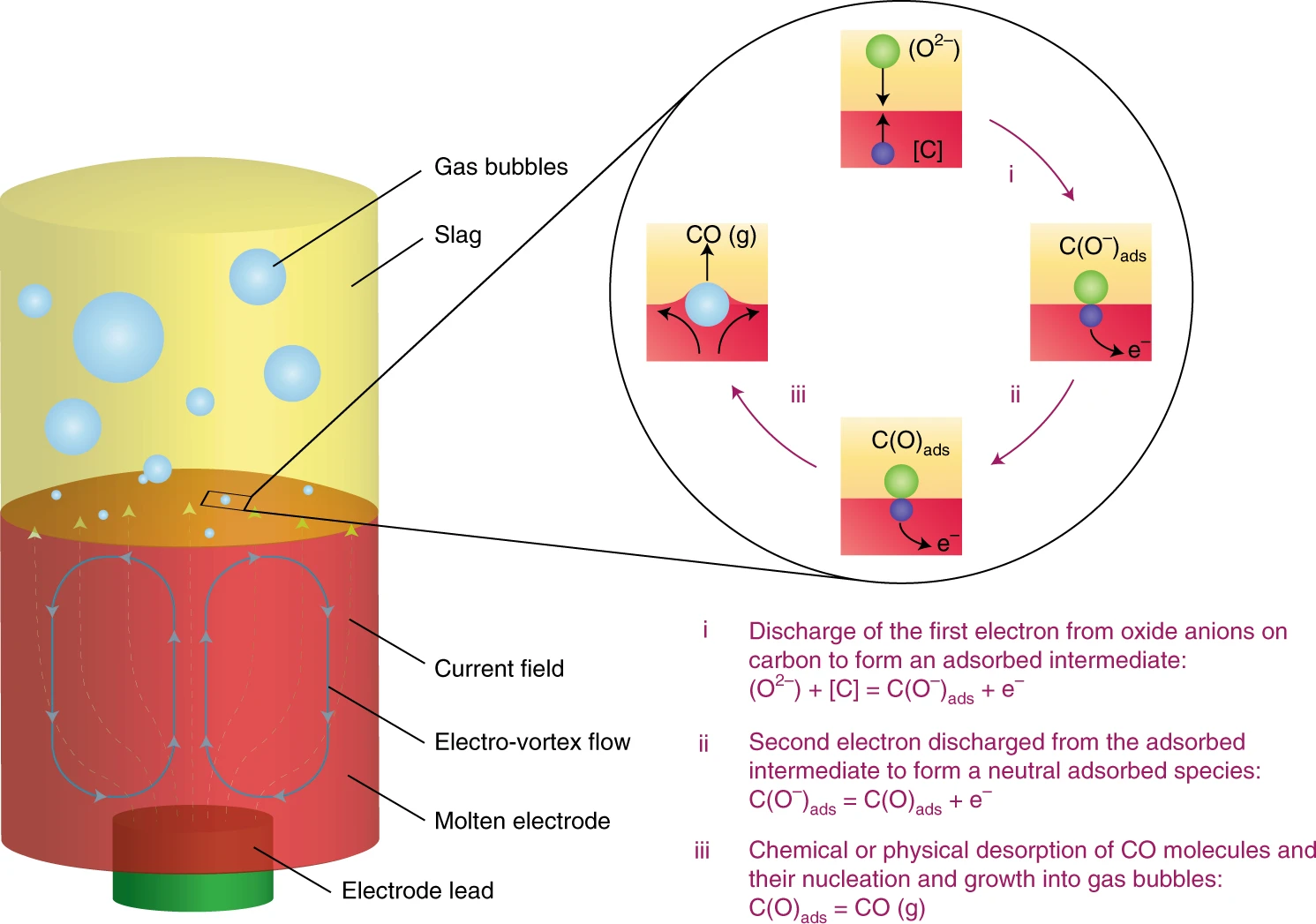
Direct Decarburization Reaction

The purpose of this method is to reduce carbon content from steel. This process is suitable for secondary steelmaking industry which recycling steel scrap that has variety of carbon content in their feedstock. This method aim to replace current conventional method that utilizing Basic Oxygen Furnace (BOF) to reduce carbon content of iron by blowing oxygen to make it react with carbon and forming CO_{2}.

In electrorefining, decarburization process happened in electrochemical cell that composed of inert electrode, slag and steel. During the process, current passing through the cell and made slag and steel melted. Oxygen ion from slag decompose and oxidize carbon on steel and to form CO. That decarburizing reaction occurs in three steps as follows:

1. O^{−}_{2} + C ⇌ C(O^{−}_{(ads)}) + e^{−}
2. C(O^{−}_{(ads)}) ⇌ C(O_{(ads)}) + e^{−}
3. C(O_{(ads)}) ⇌ CO_{(g)}

(ads) = adsorbed intermediate

The total reaction from this cell is:

C + ½ SiO_{2} ⇌ CO_{(g)} + ½ Si_{(l)}

The SiO_{2} comes from the slag, based on the reaction above, besides producing CO gas. This method also produces pure silicon (depending on the slag). The benefit of this direct decarburization process is that it does not produce CO_{2}, but rather CO, which is not considered as greenhouse gas.
