= Raffinate =

Term for a chemical with component(s) removed

In chemical separation terminology, the raffinate (from French raffiner, to refine) is a product which has had a component or components removed. The product having the removed materials is referred to as the extract. For example, in solvent extraction, the raffinate is the liquid stream which remains after solutes from the original liquid are removed through contact with an immiscible liquid. In metallurgy, raffinating refers to a process in which impurities are removed from liquid material.

In pressure swing adsorption the raffinate refers to the gas which is not adsorbed during the high pressure stage. The species which is desorbed from the adsorbent at low pressure may be called the "extract" product.

== Types ==
=== Raffinate-1 or C4R1 ===
In naphtha cracking process, C4R1 refers to C4 residual obtained after separation of 1,3-butadiene from C4 raffinate stream and which, mainly consists of isobutylene 40~50 wt% and cis- or trans-2-butene 30~35 wt%. Normally C4R1 is a side product in 1,3-butadiene plant and feed to tert-butyl alcohol plant.

=== Raffinate-2 or C4R2 ===
In naphtha cracking process, C4R2 refers to C4 residual obtained after separation of 1,3-butadiene and isobutylene from C4 raffinate stream and which mainly consists of cis- or trans-2-butene 50~60 wt%, 1-butene 10~15 wt%, and n-butane ~20 wt%. Normally C4R2 is a side product in tert-butyl alcohol plant if C4R1 is used for feed.

=== Raffinate-3 or C4R3 ===
In naphtha cracking process, C4R3 refers to C4 residual obtained after separation of 1,3-butadiene, isobutylene, and 1-butene from C4 raffinate stream which mainly consists of cis- or trans-2-butene, n-butane, and unseparated 1-butene. Normally C4R3 is being process through a selective hydrogenation unit (SHU) and CDHydro deisobutenizer unit to produce isobutylene as a feed to tert-butyl alcohol plant.

=== Raffinate-4 or C4R4 ===
In naphtha cracking process, C4R4 refers to C4 residual obtained after separation of 1,3-butadiene, isobutylene, 1-butene, and cis- or trans-2-butene from C4 raffinate stream which mainly consists of n-butane. Normally C4R4 is a side product in tert-butyl alcohol plant if C4R3 is used for feed.

== See also ==
- Thin layer extraction
