= Tributyl phosphate =

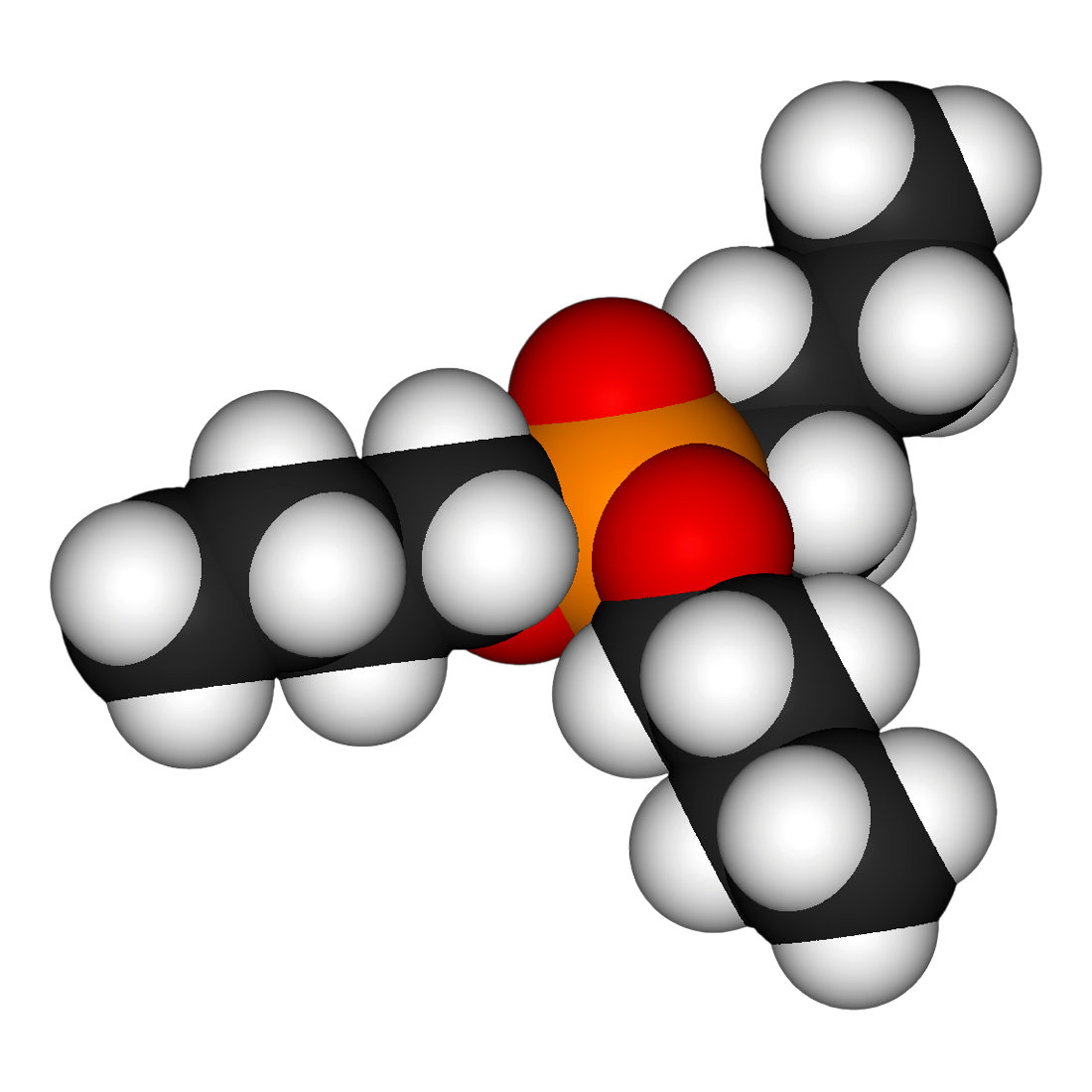
Spacefill model of Tributyl phosphate
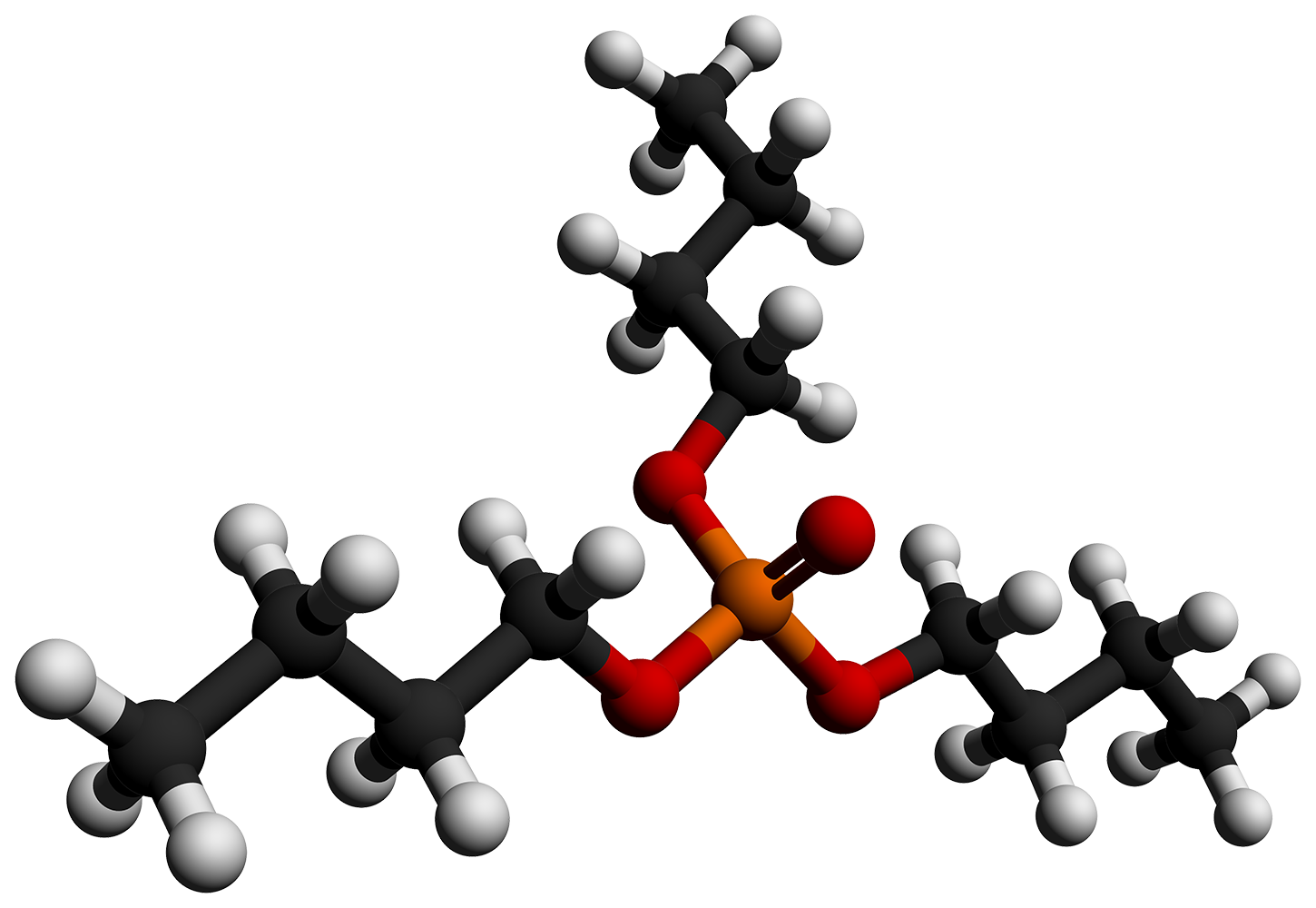
Ball and stick model of Tributyl phosphate

Names
- Preferred IUPAC name Tributyl phosphate

Identifiers
CAS Number	126-73-8
3D model (JSmol)	Interactive image
ChEBI	CHEBI:35019
ChemSpider	29090
ECHA InfoCard	100.004.365
KEGG	C14439
PubChem CID	31357
UNII	95UAS8YAF5
CompTox Dashboard (EPA)	DTXSID3021986
- InChI: InChI=1S/C12H27O4P/c1-4-7-10-14-17(13,15-11-8-5-2)16-12-9-6-3/h4-12H2,1-3H3 Key: STCOOQWBFONSKY-UHFFFAOYSA-N; InChI=1/C12H27O4P/c1-4-7-10-14-17(13,15-11-8-5-2)16-12-9-6-3/h4-12H2,1-3H3 Key: STCOOQWBFONSKY-UHFFFAOYAN
- SMILES: O=P(OCCCC)(OCCCC)OCCCC

Properties
Chemical formula	C_{12}H_{27}O_{4}P
Molar mass	266.318 g·mol^{−1}
Appearance	Colorless to pale-yellow liquid
Density	0.9727 g/mL
Melting point	−80 °C (−112 °F; 193 K)
Boiling point	289 °C (552 °F; 562 K)
Solubility in water	0.4 g/L
Vapor pressure	0.004 mmHg (25°C)
Refractive index (n_{D})	1.4231 (at 20 °C)

Hazards
NFPA 704 (fire diamond)	2 1 1
Flash point	146.1 °C (295.0 °F; 419.2 K)
- Lethal dose or concentration (LD, LC)
LD_{50} (median dose)	1189 mg/kg (mouse, oral); 3000 mg/kg (rat, oral)
LC_{50} (median concentration)	227 ppm (cat, 4–5 h); 123 ppm (rat, 6 h); 117 ppm (rat); 2529 ppm (rat, 1 h)
LC_{Lo} (lowest published)	2214 ppm (cat, 5 h)
- NIOSH (US health exposure limits)
PEL (Permissible)	TWA 5 mg/m^{3}
REL (Recommended)	TWA 0.2 ppm (2.5 mg/m^{3})
IDLH (Immediate danger)	30 ppm
Safety data sheet (SDS)	External MSDS
- Except where otherwise noted, data are given for materials in their standard state (at 25 °C [77 °F], 100 kPa). verify (what is ?) Infobox references

Tributyl phosphate, known commonly as TBP, is an organophosphorus compound with the chemical formula (CH_{3}CH_{2}CH_{2}CH_{2}O)_{3}PO. This colourless, odourless liquid finds some applications as an extractant and a plasticizer. It is an ester of phosphoric acid with n-butanol.

== Production ==
Tributyl phosphate is manufactured by reaction of phosphoryl chloride with n-butanol.

POCl_{3} + 3 C_{4}H_{9}OH → PO(OC_{4}H_{9})_{3} + 3 HCl

Production is estimated at 3,000–5,000 tonnes worldwide.

== Use ==
TBP is a solvent and plasticizer for cellulose esters such as nitrocellulose and cellulose acetate, similarly to tricresyl phosphate. It is also used as a flame retardant for cellulose fabrics such as cotton. It forms stable hydrophobic complexes with some metals; these complexes are soluble in organic solvents as well as supercritical CO_{2}. The major uses of TBP in industry are as a component of aircraft hydraulic fluid, brake fluid, and as a solvent for extraction and purification of rare-earth metals from their ores.

TBP finds its use as a solvent in inks, synthetic resins, gums, adhesives (namely for veneer plywood), and herbicide and fungicide concentrates.

As it has no odour, it is used as an anti-foaming agent in detergent solutions, and in various emulsions, paints, and adhesives. It is also found as a de-foamer in ethylene glycol-borax antifreeze solutions. In oil-based lubricants addition of TBP increases the oil film strength. It is used also in mercerizing liquids, where it improves their wetting properties. It can be used as a heat-exchange medium. TBP is used in some consumer products such as herbicides and water-thinned paints and tinting bases.

=== Nuclear chemistry ===
Tributyl phosphate is used in combination with di(2-ethylhexyl)phosphoric acid for the solvent extraction of uranium, as part of the purification of natural ores. It is also used in nuclear reprocessing as part of the PUREX process. A 15–40% (usually about 30%) solution of tributyl phosphate in kerosene or dodecane is used in the liquid–liquid extraction (solvent extraction) of uranium, plutonium, and thorium from spent uranium nuclear fuel rods dissolved in nitric acid. Liquid extraction can also be used for chemical uranium enrichment.

== Hazards ==
In contact with concentrated nitric acid the TBP-kerosene solution forms hazardous and explosive red oil.
