= Froth pump =

Mineral processing often relies on the formation of froth to separate rich minerals from gangue. In the process, chemicals and air are added. The rich minerals entrap the air and move as bubbles to the top of a flotation cell while the sand and clays of no commercial values sink to the bottom to form tailings. The whole process may be done in tanks in series called roughers, scavengers and cleaners.

In oilsand extraction plants, the froth is formed to remove the bitumen and it is called oilsand froth. Oilsand froth is difficult to pump at very low speeds and at low temperatures. However above a certain speed in a steel pipe, water may separate and form a lubrication layer. The process is called self-lubrication and depending on the temperature (25 C - 45 C), the friction losses are between 10 and 20 times the equivalent friction losses of water. When entering a centrifugal pump, a low pressure forms at the eye of the impeller. Pre-rotation creates centrifugal forces that push the dense slurry towards the wall of the pipe while leaving a core of air at the center. According to Abulnaga (2004), the froth pump may use -( a) a very large eye diameter - (b) an inducer or having the impeller vanes extend into the suction pipe - (c) a recirculating pipe from the discharge side of the pump with pressurized froth to break up the bubbles at the eye - (d) tandem vanes at the impeller shroud - (e) split or secondary vanes at the shroud - (f) vertical arrangement, thus: The split vanes in a slurry pump must be thick enough to resist continuous wear.thus:
