= Heap leaching =

Industrial mining process used to extract precious metals from ore

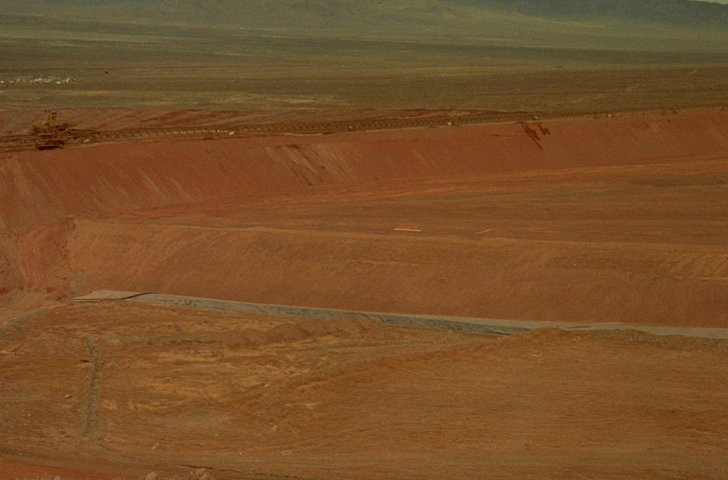
Gold heap leaching

Heap leaching is an industrial mining process used to extract precious metals, copper, uranium, and other compounds from ore using a series of chemical reactions that absorb specific minerals and re-separate them after their division from other earth materials. While similar to in situ mining, heap leach mining differs in that it places ore on a liner, then adds the chemicals via drip systems to the ore, whereas in situ mining lacks these liners and pulls pregnant solution up to obtain the minerals. Heap leaching is widely used in modern large-scale mining operations as it produces the desired concentrates at a lower cost compared to conventional processing methods such as flotation, agitation, and vat leaching.

Additionally, dump leaching is an essential part of most copper mining operations and determines the quality grade of the produced material along with other factors

Due to the profitability that the dump leaching has on the mining process, i.e. it can contribute substantially to the economic viability of the mining process, it is advantageous to include the results of the leaching operation in the economic overall project evaluation.

The process has ancient origins; one of the classical methods for the manufacture of copperas (iron sulfate) was to heap up iron pyrite and collect the leachate from the heap, which was then boiled with iron to produce iron(II) sulfate.

== Process ==
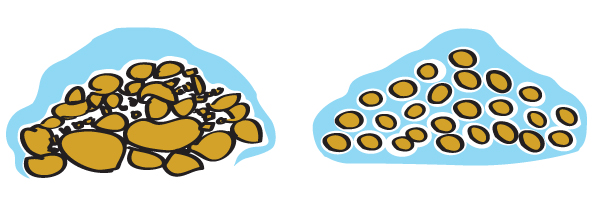
Left: ore fines without agglomeration. Right: Ore fines after agglomeration - Improved percolation as a result of agglomeration.

The mined ore is usually crushed into small chunks and heaped on an impermeable plastic or clay lined leach pad where it can be irrigated with a leach solution to dissolve the valuable metals. While sprinklers are occasionally used for irrigation, more often operations use drip irrigation to minimize evaporation, provide more uniform distribution of the leach solution, and avoid damaging the exposed mineral. The solution then percolates through the heap and leaches both the target and other minerals. This process, called the "leach cycle," generally takes from one or two months for simple oxide ores (e.g. most gold ores) to two years for nickel laterite ores. The leach solution containing the dissolved minerals is then collected, treated in a process plant to recover the target mineral and in some cases precipitate other minerals, and recycled to the heap after reagent levels are adjusted. Ultimate recovery of the target mineral can range from 30% of contained run-of-mine dump leaching sulfide copper ores to over 90% for the ores that are easiest to leach, some oxide gold ores.

The essential questions to address during the process of the heap leaching are:

- Can the investment of crushing the ore be justified by the potential increase in recovery and rate of recovery?
- How should the concentration of acid be altered over time in order to produce a solution that can be economically treated?
- How does the form of a heap affect the recovery and solution grade?
- Under any given set of circumstances, what type of recovery can be expected before the leach solution quality drops below a critical limit?
- What recovery (quantifiable measure) can be expected?

In recent years, the addition of an agglomeration drum has improved on the heap leaching process by allowing for a more efficient leach. The rotary drum agglomerator works by taking the crushed ore fines and agglomerating them into more uniform particles. This makes it much easier for the leaching solution to percolate through the pile, making its way through the channels between particles.

The addition of an agglomeration drum also has the added benefit of being able to pre-mix the leaching solution with the ore fines to achieve a more concentrated, homogeneous mixture and allow the leach to begin prior to the heap.

Although heap leach design has made significant progress over the last few years through the use of new materials and improved analytical tools, industrial experience shows that there are significant benefits from extending the design process beyond the liner and into the rock pile itself. Characterization of the physical and hydraulic (hydrodynamic) properties of ore-for-leach focuses on the direct measurement of the key properties of the ore, namely:

- The relationship between heap height and ore bulk density (density profile)
- The relationship between bulk density and percolation capacity (conductivity profile)
- The relationship between the bulk density, porosity and its components (micro and macro)
- The relationship between the moisture content and percolation capacity (conductivity curve)
- The relationship between the aforementioned parameters and the ore preparation practices (mining, crushing, agglomeration, curing, and method of placement)

Theoretical and numerical analysis, and operational data show that these fundamental mechanisms are controlled by scale, dimensionality, and heterogeneity, all of which adversely affect the scalability of metallurgical and hydrodynamic properties from the lab to the field. The dismissal of these mechanisms can result in a number of practical and financial problems that will resonate throughout the life of the heap impacting the financial return of the operation. Through procedures that go beyond the commonly employed metallurgical testing and the integration of data gleaned through real time 3D monitoring, a more complete representative characterization of the physicochemical properties of the heap environment is obtained. This improved understanding results in a significantly higher degree of accuracy in terms of creating a truly representative sample of the environment within the heap.

By adhering to the characterization identified above, a more comprehensive view of heap leach environments can be realized, allowing the industry to move away from the de facto black-box approach to a physicochemically inclusive industrial reactor model.

=== Precious metals ===
The crushed ore is irrigated with a dilute alkaline cyanide solution. The solution containing the dissolved precious metals in a pregnant solution continues percolating through the crushed ore until it reaches the liner at the bottom of the heap where it drains into a storage (pregnant solution) pond. After separating the precious metals from the pregnant solution, the dilute cyanide solution (now called "barren solution") is normally re-used in the heap-leach-process or occasionally sent to an industrial water treatment facility where the residual cyanide is treated and residual metals are removed. In very high rainfall areas, such as the tropics, in some cases there is surplus water that is then discharged to the environment, after treatment, posing possible water pollution if treatment is not properly carried out.

The production of one gold ring through this method, can generate 20 tons of waste material.

During the extraction phase, the gold ions form complex ions with the cyanide:

$$\ce{{Au+ (s)} + 2CN^- (aq) -> Au(CN)2^- (aq)}$$

Recovery of the gold is readily achieved with a redox-reaction:

$$\ce{{2 Au(CN)2^- (aq)} + Zn (s) -> {Zn(CN)4^2^- (aq)} + 2 Au (s)}$$

The most common methods to remove the gold from solution are either using activated carbon to selectively absorb it, or the Merrill-Crowe process where zinc powder is added to cause a precipitation of gold and zinc. The fine product can be either doré (gold-silver bars) or zinc-gold sludge that is then refined elsewhere.

=== Copper ores ===
The method is similar to the cyanide method above, except sulfuric acid is used to dissolve copper from its ores. The acid is recycled from the solvent extraction circuit (see solvent extraction-electrowinning, SX/EW) and reused on the leach pad. A byproduct is iron(II) sulfate, jarosite, which is produced as a byproduct of leaching pyrite, and sometimes even the same sulfuric acid that is needed for the process. Both oxide and sulfide ores can be leached, though the leach cycles are much different and sulfide leaching requires a bacterial, or bio-leach, component.

In 2011 leaching, both heap leaching and in-situ leaching, produced 3.4 million metric tons of copper, 22 percent of world production. The largest copper heap leach operations are in Chile, Peru, and the southwestern United States.

Although heap leaching is a low cost-process, it normally has recovery rates of 60-70%. It is normally most profitable with low-grade ores. Higher-grade ores are usually put through more complex milling processes where higher recoveries justify the extra cost. The process chosen depends on the properties of the ore.

The final product is cathode copper.

=== Nickel ores ===
This method is an acid heap leaching method like that of the copper method in that it utilises sulfuric acid instead of cyanide solution to dissolve the target minerals from crushed ore. The amount of sulfuric acid required is much higher than for copper ores, as high as 1,000 kg of acid per tonne of ore, but 500 kg is more common. The method was originally patented by Australian miner BHP and is being commercialized by Cerro Matoso in Colombia, a wholly owned subsidiary of BHP; Vale in Brazil; and European Nickel for the rock laterite deposits of Turkey, Talvivaara mine in Finland, the Balkans, and the Philippines. There currently are no operating commercial scale nickel laterite heap leach operations, but there is a sulphide HL operating in Finland.

Nickel recovery from the leach solutions is much more complex than for copper and requires various stages of iron and magnesium removal, and the process produces both leached ore residue ("ripios") and chemical precipitates from the recovery plant (principally iron oxide residues, magnesium sulfate and calcium sulfate) in roughly equal proportions. Thus, a unique feature of nickel heap leaching is the need for a tailings disposal area.

The final product can be nickel hydroxide precipitates (NHP) or mixed metal hydroxide precipitates (MHP), which are then subject to conventional smelting to produce metallic nickel.

=== Uranium ores ===
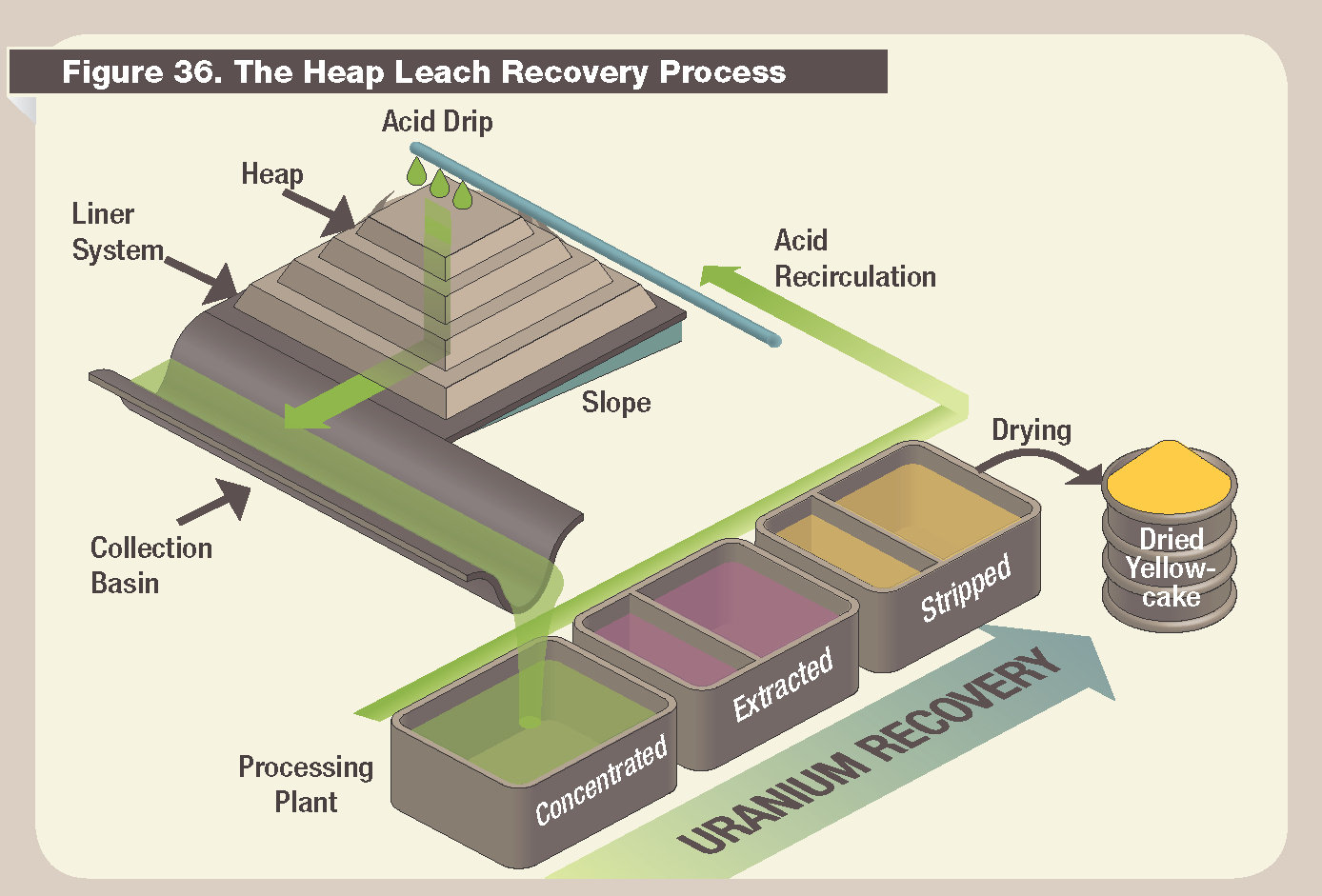
Diagram of heap leach recovery for uranium (US NRC)

Similar to copper oxide heap leaching, also using dilute sulfuric acid. Rio Tinto is commercializing this technology in Namibia and Australia; the French nuclear fuel company Orano, in Niger with two mines and Namibia; and several other companies are studying its feasibility.

The final product is yellowcake and requires significant further processing to produce fuel-grade feed.

=== Apparatus ===
While most mining companies have shifted from a previously accepted sprinkler method to the percolation of slowly dripping choice chemicals including cyanide or sulfuric acid closer to the actual ore bed, heap leach pads have not changed too much throughout the years. There are still four main categories of pads: conventional, dump leach, valley fills, and on/off pads. Typically, each pad only has a single, geomembrane liner for each pad, with a minimum thickness of 1.5mm, usually thicker.

The conventional pads simplest in design are used for mostly flat or gentle areas and hold thinner layers of crushed ore. Dump leach pads hold more ore and can usually handle a less flat terrain. Valley fills are pads situated at valley bottoms or levels that can hold everything falling into it. On/off pads involve putting significantly larger loads on the pads and removing and reloading it after every cycle.

Many of these mines which previously had digging depths of about 15 meters are digging deeper than ever before to mine materials, approximately 50 meters, sometimes more, which means that, in order to accommodate all of the ground being displaced, pads will have to hold higher weights from more crushed ore being contained in a smaller area (Lupo 2010). With that increase in build up comes in potential for decrease in yield or ore quality, as well as potential either weak spots in the lining or areas of increased pressure buildup. This build up still has the potential to lead to punctures in the liner. As of 2004 cushion fabrics, which could reduce potential punctures and their leaking, were still being debated due to their tendency to increase risks if too much weight on too large a surface was placed on the cushioning (Thiel and Smith 2004). In addition, some liners, depending on their composition, may react with salts in the soil as well as acid from the chemical leaching to affect the successfulness of the liner. This can be amplified over time.

== Environmental concerns ==
=== Effectiveness ===
Heap leach mining works well for large volumes of low grade ores, as reduced metallurgical treatment (comminution) of the ore is required in order to extract an equivalent amount of minerals when compared to milling. The significantly reduced processing costs are offset by the reduced yield of usually approximately 60-70%. The amount of overall environmental impact caused by heap leaching is often lower than more traditional techniques. It also requires less energy consumption to use this method, which many consider to be an environmental alternative.

=== Government regulation ===
In the United States, the General Mining Law of 1872 gave rights to explore and mine on public domain land; the original law did not require post-mining reclamation (Woody et al. 2011). Mined land reclamation requirements on federal land depended on state requirements until the passage of the Federal Land Policy and Management Act in 1976. Currently, mining on federal land must have a government-approved mining and reclamation plan before mining can start. Reclamation bonds are required. Mining on either federal, state, or private land is subject to the requirements of the Clean Air Act and the Clean Water Act.

One solution proposed to reclamation problems is the privatization of the land to be mined (Woody et al. 2011).

=== Cultural and social concerns ===
With the rise of the environmentalist movement has also come an increased appreciation for social justice, and mining has showed similar trends lately. Societies located near potential mining sites are at increased risk to be subjected to injustices as their environment is affected by the changes made to mined lands—either public or private—that could eventually lead to problems in social structure, identity, and physical health (Franks 2009). Many have argued that by cycling mine power through local citizens, this disagreement can be alleviated, since both interest groups would have shared and equal voice and understanding in future goals. However, it is often difficult to match corporate mining interests with local social interests, and money is often a deciding factor in the successes of any disagreements. If communities are able to feel like they have a valid understanding and power in issues concerning their local environment and society, they are more likely to tolerate and encourage the positive benefits that come with mining, as well as more effectively promote alternative methods to heap leach mining using their intimate knowledge of the local geography (Franks 2009).

== See also ==
- Environmental justice
- Gold cyanidation
- Gold extraction
- In-situ leach
- Mineral processing
- Tailings
- Yellowcake
