= Cementation (metallurgy) =

Type of precipitation

Cementation is a method for obtaining metals from solutions of the metal ion. It is a type of precipitation, in which ions are reduced to zero valence at a solid metallic interface. A cementation step often follows leaching.

Cementation of copper is a common example. Copper ions in solution, often from an ore leaching process, convert to metallic copper in the presence of solid iron. The iron oxidizes, and the copper ions are reduced through the electron transfers. The reaction is spontaneous because copper is higher on the galvanic series than iron.

Cu^{2+}(aq) + Fe(s) → Cu(s) + Fe^{2+}(aq)

Cementation was a historically useful process for purification of copper group metals. It was one of the first tools used to purify gold from mined electrum at Sardis, in late Iron Age Lydia. It remains under investigation for modern copper extraction.

Cementation is used industrially to recover a variety of heavy metals including cadmium, and the cementation of gold by zinc in the Merrill–Crowe process accounts for a substantial fraction of world gold production.

== See also ==
- Bessemer process
- Methods of crucible steel production
- Open-hearth furnace process
