= Liquid–liquid extraction =

Method to separate compounds or metal complexes

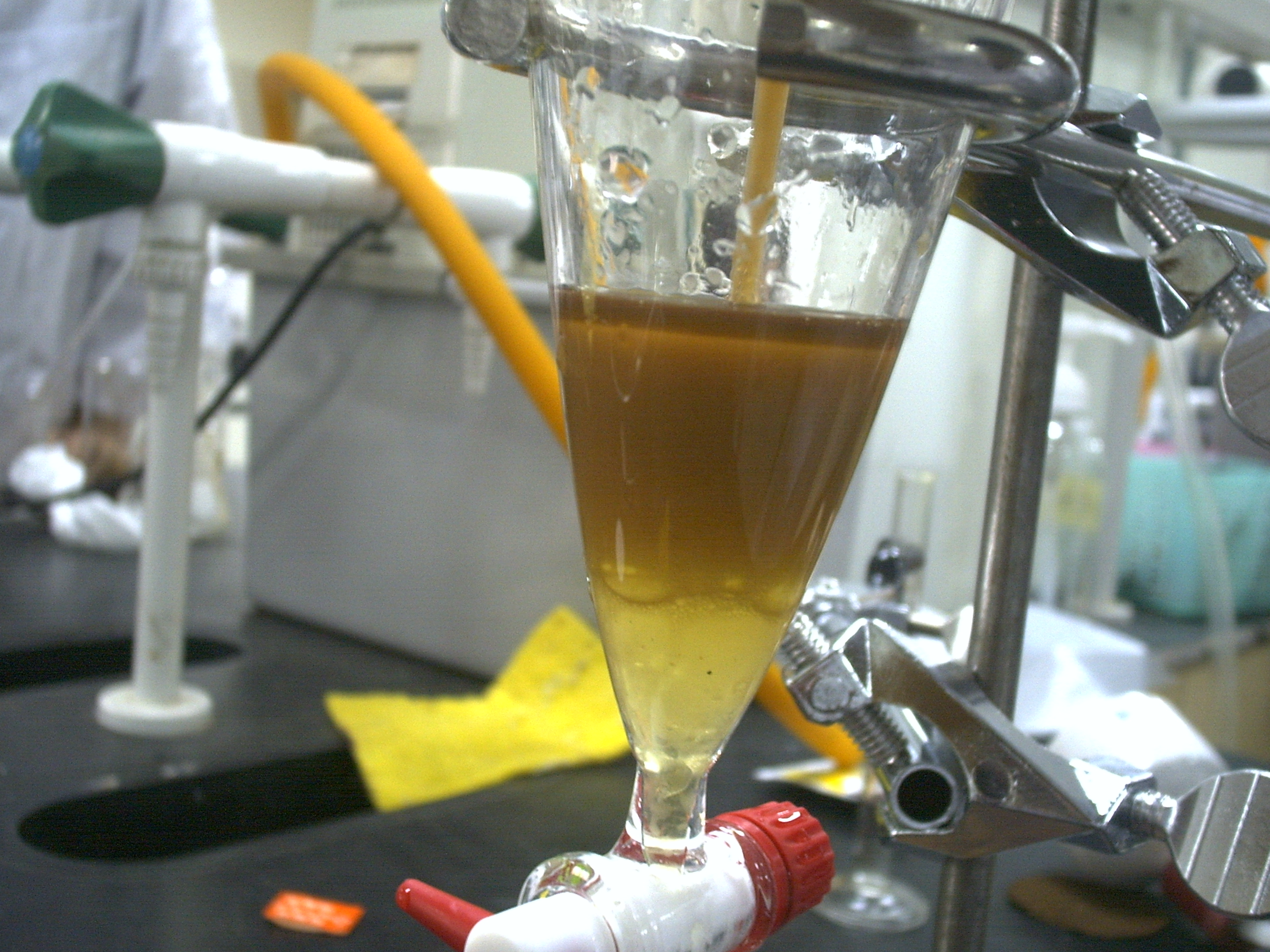
A separatory funnel used for liquid–liquid extraction, as evident by the two immiscible liquids

Liquid–liquid extraction is a method to separate compounds based on their relative solubilities in two different immiscible liquids, often water and an appropriate organic solvent. During extraction process, there is a net transfer of one or more components between the two liquid phases. This partitioning of compounds allows for purification of reaction mixtures or transfer of desirable products to an organic phase that is more easily evaporated than water.

Liquid–liquid extraction is a technique used in both chemical laboratories and in industrial separations. Separatory funnels are commonly used for small-scale separations in research or teaching labs.

Liquid-liquid extraction is commonly used for organic compounds in the scent/flavor industry, the pharmaceutical industry, and other chemical industries. Metal ions can also be separated using appropriate chelating agents to favor extraction of certain ions into aqueous vs. organic phases like the PUREX process used to separate uranium from plutonium.

Liquid-Liquid extraction can be substantially accelerated in microfluidic devices, reducing extraction and separation times from minutes/hours to mere seconds compared to conventional extractors.

== Measures of effectiveness ==
=== Distribution ratio ===
In solvent extraction, a distribution ratio (D) is often quoted as a measure of how well-extracted a species is. The distribution ratio is a measure of the total concentration of a solute in the organic phase divided by its concentration in the aqueous phase. The partition or distribution coefficient (K_{d}) is the ration of solute concentration in each layer upon reaching equilibrium. This distinction between D and K_{d} is important. The partition coefficient is a thermodynamic equilibrium constant and has a fixed value for the solute’s partitioning between the two phases. The distribution ratio’s value, however, changes with solution conditions if the relative amounts of A and B change. If we know the solute’s equilibrium reactions within each phase and between the two phases, we can derive an algebraic relationship between K_{d} and D. The partition coefficient and the distribution ratio are identical if the solute has only one chemical form in each phase; however, if the solute exists in more than one chemical form in either phase, then K_{d} and D usually have different values. Depending on the system, the distribution ratio can be a function of temperature, the concentration of chemical species in the system, and a large number of other parameters. Note that D is related to the Gibbs Free Energy (ΔG) of the extraction process.

In solvent extraction, two immiscible liquids are shaken together. The more polar solutes dissolve preferentially in the more polar solvent, and the less polar solutes in the less polar solvent. In this experiment, the nonpolar halogens preferentially dissolve in the non-polar mineral oil.

=== Separation factors ===
The separation factor is one distribution ratio divided by another; it is a measure of the ability of the system to separate two solutes. For instance, if the distribution ratio for nickel (D_{Ni}) is 10 and the distribution ratio for silver (D_{Ag}) is 100, then the silver/nickel separation factor (SF_{Ag/Ni}) is equal to D_{Ag}/D_{Ni} = SF_{Ag/Ni} = 10.

=== Measures of success ===
Success of liquid–liquid extraction is measured through separation factors and decontamination factors. The best way to understand the success of an extraction column is through the liquid–liquid equilibrium (LLE) data set. The data set can then be converted into a curve to determine the steady state partitioning behavior of the solute between the two phases. The y-axis is the concentration of solute in the extract (solvent) phase, and the x-axis is the concentration of the solute in the raffinate phase. From here, one can determine steps for optimization of the process.

== Techniques and equipment ==
Liquid-liquid extraction is often performed on a small scale by synthetic lab chemists using a separatory funnel, Craig apparatus or membrane-based techniques. On an industrial scale, devices like centrifugal contactors, thin layer extraction, spray columns, pulsed columns, and mixer-settlers are used to aid extraction. All of these techniques aim create a high surface area interface between the two liquid phases involved in extraction to aid the transfer of solutes from one phase to the other.

Phase separation during a laboratory scale liquid-liquid extraction. The upper organic ether solution of MTBE is being extracted with the lower alkaline aqueous sodium bicarbonate solution to remove benzoic acid as the benzoate anion, leaving a non-acidic organic, benzil, (yellow in color) in the organic phase.

=== Batch methods ===
==== Separatory funnels ====
Separatory funnels, colloquially called a "sep funnel," are commonly used for small-scale extractions in research or teaching labs. To perform an extraction, two immiscible liquids, typically an aqeuous solution and an organic solvent, are added to the sep funnel. The sep funnel is then shaken using appropriate technique to increase the area of contact between the two phases to aid extraction. After the two layers are allowed to settle and separate, each layer is drained from the bottom of the sep funnel into separate containers. Multiple extractions may be performed on the same reaction mixture to increase product recovery. After extraction, the extract phase can be used for further processing

Partitioning of organic compounds between the organic and aqueous phases can be controlled by adjusting the pH of the aqeuous phase. For example, increasing the pH of the aqueous solution will deprotanate organic acids, giving them a negative charge that favors partitioning into polar solvents like water. Adding a strong acid to decrease pH can have the opposite effect, neutralizing conjugate bases to form neutral compounds that can partition more easily into the organic phase.

This technique can be used in teaching labs to extract compounds like caffeine from coffee or tea using ethyl acetate as the organic extractant.

==== Dispersive liquid–liquid microextraction (dLLME) ====
Dispersive liquid-liquid microextraction is process used to extract organic compounds from water samples, typically at a smaller scale than LLE using a separatory funnel. In this process, an extraction solvent immiscible with water is mixed with a dispersive solvent. The mixture is injected into the aqueous sample to be extracted, forming a dispersion of small organic droplets in the aqueous sample. The resulting suspension is then centrifuged to coalesce the organic droplets and separate the organic and aqueous layers. The organic phase can then be removed using a microsyringe or other tool.

Chlorinated solvents are commonly used as the extractive solvent as their higher density makes them settle to the bottom of centrifuge tubes. Acetone is a common dispersive solvent.

dLLME is favored for its relatively low use of organic solvent for a batch extraction process which can reduce costs. The lower solvent usage means dLLME can be considered a "green chemistry" process though common use of chlorinated solvents as the organic phase is typically considered antithetical to green chemistry principles.

This process is useful in extraction organic compounds such as organochloride and organophosphorus pesticides, as well as substituted benzene compounds from water samples.

=== Continuous processes ===
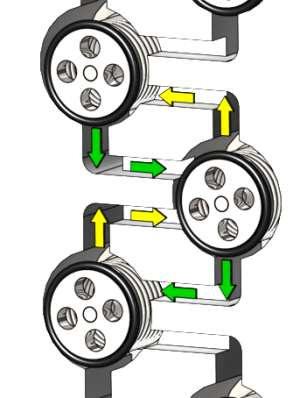
Coflore continuous countercurrent extractor

These are commonly used in industry for the processing of metals such as the lanthanides; because the separation factors between the lanthanides are so small many extraction stages are needed. In the multistage processes, the aqueous raffinate from one extraction unit is fed to the next unit as the aqueous feed, while the organic phase is moved in the opposite direction. Hence, in this way, even if the separation between two metals in each stage is small, the overall system can have a higher decontamination factor.

Multistage countercurrent arrays have been used for the separation of lanthanides. For the design of a good process, the distribution ratio should be not too high (>100) or too low (<0.1) in the extraction portion of the process. It is often the case that the process will have a section for scrubbing unwanted metals from the organic phase, and finally a stripping section to obtain the metal back from the organic phase.

==== Mixer–settlers ====
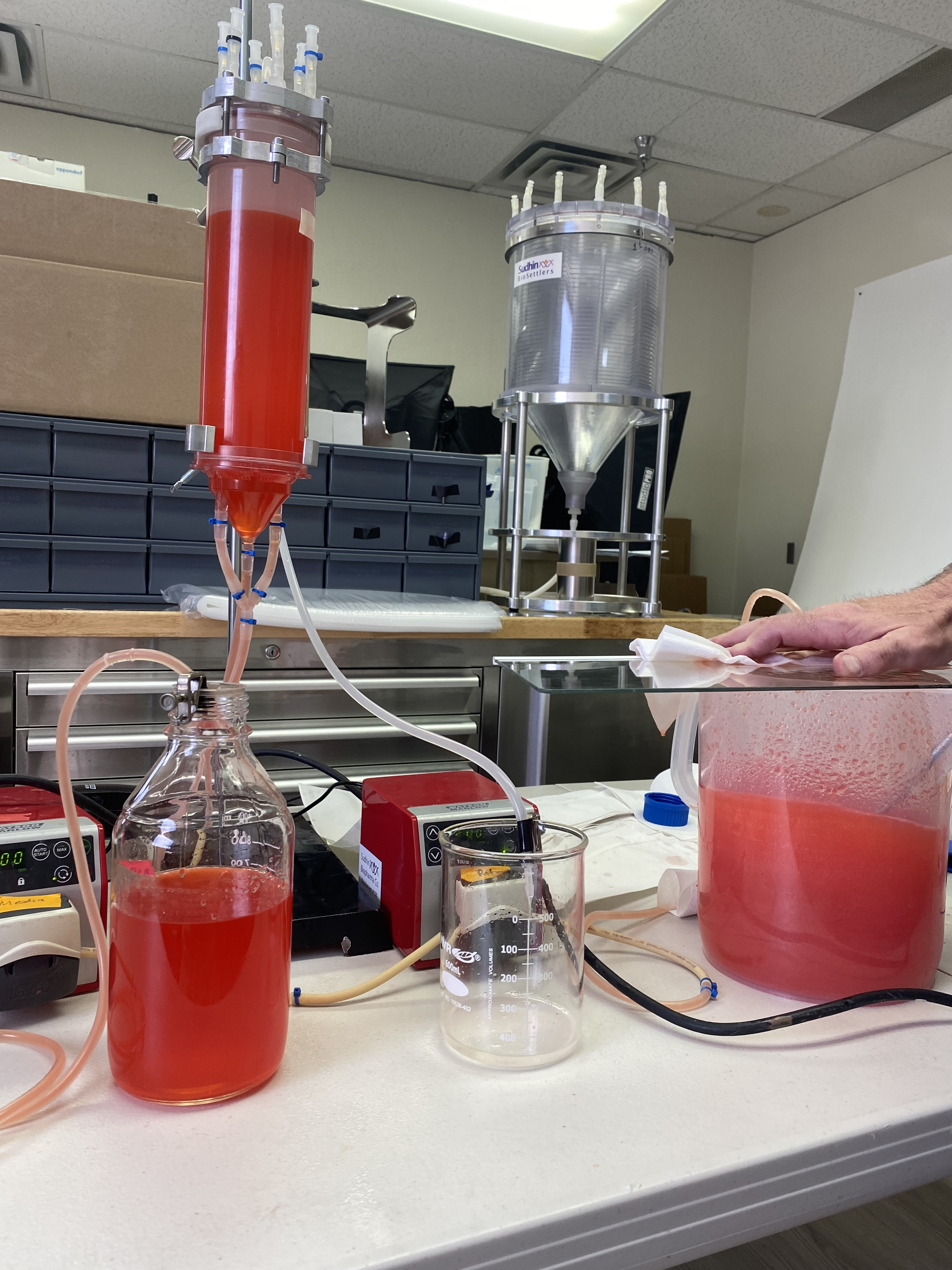
Continuous separation of oil and water mixture

A mixer-settler consists of a mixing stage that often forms a suspension of two immiscible liquids followed by a settling stage that allows the liquids to separate into two layers by gravity. Mixer-settlers are typically used when a process requires longer residence times and when the solutions are easily separated by gravity. In a multistage countercurrent process, multiple mixer-settlers are installed in series with the settled output of one stage being fed to subsequent stages for further separation.

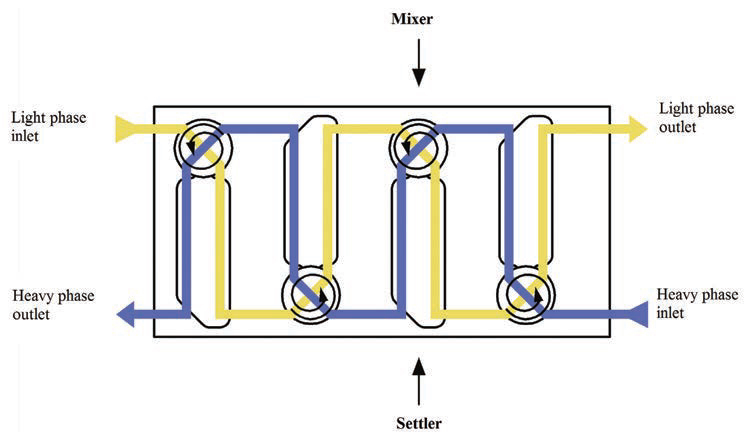
Four-stage battery of mixer-settlers for counter-current extraction

==== Centrifugal extractors ====
Centrifugal extractors mix and separate in one unit. Two liquids will be intensively mixed between the spinning rotor and the stationary housing at speeds up to 6000 RPM. This develops great surfaces for an ideal mass transfer from the aqueous phase into the organic phase. At 200–2000 g, both phases will be separated again. Centrifugal extractors minimize the solvent in the process, optimize the product load in the solvent and extract the aqueous phase completely. Counter current and cross current extractions are easily established.

=== Solvation mechanism ===
Using solvent extraction it is possible to extract uranium, plutonium, thorium and many rare earth elements from acid solutions in a selective way by using the right choice of organic extracting solvent and diluent. One solvent used for this purpose is the organophosphate tributyl phosphate (TBP). The PUREX process that is commonly used in nuclear reprocessing uses a mixture of tri-n-butyl phosphate and an inert hydrocarbon (kerosene), the uranium(VI) are extracted from strong nitric acid and are back-extracted (stripped) using weak nitric acid. An organic soluble uranium complex [UO_{2}(TBP)_{2}(NO_{3})_{2}] is formed, then the organic layer bearing the uranium is brought into contact with a dilute nitric acid solution; the equilibrium is shifted away from the organic soluble uranium complex and towards the free TBP and uranyl nitrate in dilute nitric acid. The plutonium(IV) forms a similar complex to the uranium(VI), but it is possible to strip the plutonium in more than one way; a reducing agent that converts the plutonium to the trivalent oxidation state can be added. This oxidation state does not form a stable complex with TBP and nitrate unless the nitrate concentration is very high (circa 10 mol/L nitrate is required in the aqueous phase). Another method is to simply use dilute nitric acid as a stripping agent for the plutonium. This PUREX chemistry is a classic example of a solvation extraction. In this case, D_{U} = k [TBP]^{2}[NO_{3}^{−}]^{2}.

=== Ion exchange mechanism ===
Another extraction mechanism is known as the ion exchange mechanism. Here, when an ion is transferred from the aqueous phase to the organic phase, another ion is transferred in the other direction to maintain the charge balance. This additional ion is often a hydrogen ion; for ion exchange mechanisms, the distribution ratio is often a function of pH. An example of an ion exchange extraction would be the extraction of americium by a combination of terpyridine and a carboxylic acid in tert-butyl benzene. In this case

D_{Am} = k [terpyridine]^{1}[carboxylic acid]^{3}[H^{+}]^{−3}

Another example is the extraction of zinc, cadmium, or lead by a dialkyl phosphinic acid (R_{2}PO_{2}H) into a nonpolar diluent such as an alkane. A non-polar diluent favours the formation of uncharged non-polar metal complexes.

Some extraction systems are able to extract metals by both the solvation and ion exchange mechanisms; an example of such a system is the americium (and lanthanide) extraction from nitric acid by a combination of 6,6'-bis-(5,6-dipentyl-1,2,4-triazin-3-yl)-2,2'-bipyridine and 2-bromohexanoic acid in tert-butyl benzene. At both high- and low-nitric acid concentrations, the metal distribution ratio is higher than it is for an intermediate nitric acid concentration.

=== Ion pair extraction ===
It is possible by careful choice of counterion to extract a metal. For instance, if the nitrate concentration is high, it is possible to extract americium as an anionic nitrate complex if the mixture contains a lipophilic quaternary ammonium salt.

An example that is more likely to be encountered by the 'average' chemist is the use of a phase transfer catalyst. This is a charged species that transfers another ion to the organic phase. The ion reacts and then forms another ion, which is then transferred back to the aqueous phase.

For instance, the 31.1 kJ mol^{−1} is required to transfer an acetate anion into nitrobenzene, while the energy required to transfer a chloride anion from an aqueous phase to nitrobenzene is 43.8 kJ mol^{−1}. Hence, if the aqueous phase in a reaction is a solution of sodium acetate while the organic phase is a nitrobenzene solution of benzyl chloride, then, when a phase transfer catalyst, the acetate anions can be transferred from the aqueous layer where they react with the benzyl chloride to form benzyl acetate and a chloride anion. The chloride anion is then transferred to the aqueous phase. The transfer energies of the anions contribute to that given out by the reaction.

A 43.8 to 31.1 kJ mol^{−1} = 12.7 kJ mol^{−1} of additional energy is given out by the reaction when compared with energy if the reaction had been done in nitrobenzene using one equivalent weight of a tetraalkylammonium acetate.

==== Types of aqueous two-phase extractions ====
Polymer–polymer systems. In a Polymer–polymer system, both phases are generated by a dissolved polymer. The heavy phase will generally be a polysaccharide, and the light phase is generally Polyethylene glycol (PEG). Traditionally, the polysaccharide used is dextran. However, dextran is relatively expensive, and research has been exploring using less expensive polysaccharides to generate the heavy phase. If the target compound being separated is a protein or enzyme, it is possible to incorporate a ligand to the target into one of the polymer phases. This improves the target's affinity to that phase, and improves its ability to partition from one phase into the other. This, as well as the absence of solvents or other denaturing agents, makes polymer–polymer extractions an attractive option for purifying proteins. The two phases of a polymer–polymer system often have very similar densities, and very low surface tension between them. Because of this, demixing a polymer–polymer system is often much more difficult than demixing a solvent extraction. Methods to improve the demixing include centrifugation, and application of an electric field.

Polymer–salt systems. Aqueous two-phase systems can also be generated by generating the heavy phase with a concentrated salt solution. The polymer phase used is generally still PEG. Generally, a kosmotropic salt, such as Na_{3}PO_{4} is used, however PEG–NaCl systems have been documented when the salt concentration is high enough. Since polymer–salt systems demix readily they are easier to use. However, at high salt concentrations, proteins generally either denature, or precipitate from solution. Thus, polymer–salt systems are not as useful for purifying proteins.

Ionic liquids systems. Ionic liquids are ionic compounds with low melting points. While they are not technically aqueous, recent research has experimented with using them in an extraction that does not use organic solvents.

==== DNA purification ====
The ability to purify DNA from a sample is important for many modern biotechnology processes. However, samples often contain nucleases that degrade the target DNA before it can be purified. It has been shown that DNA fragments will partition into the light phase of a polymer–salt separation system. If ligands known to bind and deactivate nucleases are incorporated into the polymer phase, the nucleases will then partition into the heavy phase and be deactivated. Thus, this polymer–salt system is a useful tool for purifying DNA from a sample while simultaneously protecting it from nucleases.

==== Food industry ====
The PEG–NaCl system has been shown to be effective at partitioning small molecules, such as peptides and nucleic acids. These compounds are often flavorants or odorants. The system could then be used by the food industry to isolate or eliminate particular flavors. Caffeine extraction used to be done using liquid–liquid extraction, specifically direct and indirect liquid–liquid extraction (Swiss Water Method), but has since moved towards super-critical CO_{2} as it is cheaper and can be done on a commercial scale.

==== Analytical chemistry ====
Often there are chemical species present or necessary at one stage of sample processing that will interfere with the analysis. For example, some air monitoring is performed by drawing air through a small glass tube filled with sorbent particles that have been coated with a chemical to stabilize or derivatize the analyte of interest. The coating may be of such a concentration or characteristics that it would damage the instrumentation or interfere with the analysis. If the sample can be extracted from the sorbent using a nonpolar solvent (such as toluene or carbon disulfide), and the coating is polar (such as HBr or phosphoric acid) the dissolved coating will partition into the aqueous phase. Clearly the reverse is true as well, using polar extraction solvent and a nonpolar solvent to partition a nonpolar interferent. A small aliquot of the organic phase (or in the latter case, polar phase) can then be injected into the instrument for analysis.

==== Purification of amines ====
Amines (analogously to ammonia) have a lone pair of electrons on the nitrogen atom that can form a relatively weak bond to a hydrogen atom. It is therefore the case that under acidic conditions amines are typically protonated, carrying a positive charge and under basic conditions they are typically deprotonated and neutral. Amines of sufficiently low molecular weight are rather polar and can form hydrogen bonds with water and therefore will readily dissolve in aqueous solutions. Deprotonated amines on the other hand, are neutral and have greasy, nonpolar organic substituents, and therefore have a higher affinity for nonpolar inorganic solvents. As such purification steps can be carried out where an aqueous solution of an amine is neutralized with a base such as sodium hydroxide, then shaken in a separatory funnel with a nonpolar solvent that is immiscible with water. The organic phase is then drained off. Subsequent processing can recover the amine by techniques such as recrystallization, evaporation or distillation; subsequent extraction back to a polar phase can be performed by adding HCl and shaking again in a separatory funnel (at which point the ammonium ion could be recovered by adding an insoluble counterion), or in either phase, reactions could be performed as part of a chemical synthesis.

=== Temperature swing solvent extraction ===
Temperature swing solvent extraction is an experimental technique for the desalination of drinking water. It has been used to remove up to 98.5% of the salt content in water, and is able to process hypersaline brines that cannot be desalinated using reverse osmosis.

== Kinetics of extraction ==
It is important to investigate the rate at which the solute is transferred between the two phases, in some cases by an alteration of the contact time it is possible to alter the selectivity of the extraction. For instance, the extraction of palladium or nickel can be very slow because the rate of ligand exchange at these metal centers is much lower than the rates for iron or silver complexes.

== Aqueous complexing agents ==
If a complexing agent is present in the aqueous phase then it can lower the distribution ratio. For instance, in the case of iodine being distributed between water and an inert organic solvent such as carbon tetrachloride then the presence of iodide in the aqueous phase can alter the extraction chemistry: instead of $D_{\mathrm{I}^{+2}}$ being a constant it becomes

$D_{\mathrm{I}^{+2}}$ = k[I_{2} (organic)]/[I_{2} (aq)][I^{−} (aq)]

This is because the iodine reacts with the iodide to form I_{3}^{−}. The I_{3}^{−} anion is an example of a polyhalide anion that is quite common.

== Industrial process design ==
In a typical scenario, an industrial process will use an extraction step in which solutes are transferred from the aqueous phase to the organic phase; this is often followed by a scrubbing stage in which unwanted solutes are removed from the organic phase, then a stripping stage in which the wanted solutes are removed from the organic phase. The organic phase may then be treated to make it ready for use again.

After use, the organic phase may be subjected to a cleaning step to remove any degradation products; for instance, in PUREX plants, the used organic phase is washed with sodium carbonate solution to remove any dibutyl hydrogen phosphate or butyl dihydrogen phosphate that might be present.

=== Liquid-liquid equilibrium calculations ===
In order to calculate the phase equilibrium, it is necessary to use a thermodynamic model such as NRTL, UNIQUAC, etc. The corresponding parameters of these models can be obtained from literature (e.g. Dechema Chemistry Data Series, Dortmund Data Bank, etc.) or by a correlation process of experimental data.

== Extraction of metals ==
The extraction methods for a range of metals include:

=== Cerium ===
Ce(IV) can separated from other rare earth (III) ions by using sulfuric acid and HDEHP to produce high-purity cerium oxide.

=== Cobalt ===
The extraction of cobalt from hydrochloric acid using Alamine 336 (tri-octyl/decyl amine) in meta-xylene. Cobalt can be extracted also using Ionquest 290 or Cyanex 272 {bis-(2,4,4-trimethylpentyl) phosphinic acid}.

=== Copper ===
Copper can be extracted using hydroxyoximes as extractants, a recent paper describes an extractant that has a good selectivity for copper over cobalt and nickel.

=== Gadolinium ===
The rare earth element Gadolinium can be extracted with n-tributyl phosphate and nitric acid to yield over a kilogram of gadolinium oxide.

=== Neodymium ===
The rare earth element Neodymium is extracted by di(2-ethyl-hexyl)phosphoric acid into hexane by an ion exchange mechanism. Neodymium can also be separated from dysprosium through selective precipitation of dysprosium with Cyanex 272 when the HNO_{3} concentration was 0.001 mol/L.

=== Nickel ===
Nickel can be extracted using di(2-ethyl-hexyl)phosphoric acid and tributyl phosphate in a hydrocarbon diluent (Shellsol).

=== Palladium and platinum ===
Dialkyl sulfides, tributyl phosphate and alkyl amines have been used for extracting palladium and platinum.

=== Polonium ===
Polonium is produced in reactors from natural ^{209}Bi, bombarded with neutrons, creating ^{210}Bi, which then decays to ^{210}Po via beta-minus decay. The final purification is done pyrochemically with sodium hydroxide at 500 °C. This is then followed by liquid-liquid extraction, with dibutyl Carbitol as the extractant.

=== Thorium ===
Thorium can be extracted from other rare earths by using sulfuric acid and the extractant, N1923, to produce thorium oxide with 99.5% purity and 99% recovery.

=== Zinc and cadmium ===
Zinc and cadmium are both extracted by an ion exchange process, the N,N,N′,N′-tetrakis(2-pyridylmethyl)ethylenediamine (TPEN) acts as a masking agent for the zinc and an extractant for the cadmium. In the modified Zincex process, zinc is separated from most divalent ions by solvent extraction. D2EHPA (Di (2) ethyl hexyl phosphoric acid) is used for this. A zinc ion replaces the proton from two D2EHPA molecules. To strip the zinc from the D2EHPA, sulfuric acid is used, at a concentration of above 170g/L (typically 240-265g/L).

=== Lithium ===
Lithium extraction is more popular due to the high demand of lithium-ion batteries. TBP (Tri-butyl phosphate) and FeCl_{3} are mostly used to extract lithium from brine (with high Li/Mg ratio). Alternatively, Cyanex 272 was also used to extract lithium. The mechanism of lithium extraction was found differently from other metals, such as cobalt, due to the weak coordinating bonding between lithium ions and extractants.

== See also ==
- Fragrance extraction
- Dortmund Data Bank
- Non-random two-liquid model - (NRTL model) LL Phase Equilibrium Calculation
- UNIQUAC - LL Phase Equilibrium Calculation
